= 1960 Illinois elections =

- November 8, 1960
- Turnout: 88.11%

Elections were held in Illinois on Tuesday, November 8, 1960.

Primaries were held on April 12.

== Election information ==
The election coincided with the 1960 presidential election, in which Democratic nominee John F. Kennedy narrowly won Illinois. In Illinois races, the Democratic Party had many successes, flipping four of five state constitutional offices from Republican to Democratic, and electing its three nominees for trustees of the University of Illinois. Democrats, however, lost their majority in the state house, which was at the time malapportioned in favor of Republicans.

=== Turnout ===
In the primaries, turnout was 40.92%, with 2,082,667 ballots cast (1,171,488 Democratic and 911,179 Republican).

In the general election, turnout was 88.11%, with 4,845,319 ballots cast.

== Federal elections ==
=== United States President ===
Illinois voted for the Democratic ticket of John F. Kennedy and Lyndon B. Johnson.

=== United States Senate ===
Democratic Senator Paul Douglas was reelected to a third term.

=== United States House ===
All 25 Illinois seats in the United States House of Representatives were up for election in 1960.

No seats switched parties, leaving Illinois' House delegation to consist of 14 Democrats and 11 Republicans.

== State elections ==
=== Governor ===
1960 Illinois gubernatorial election
- November 8, 1960
- Turnout: 84.99%
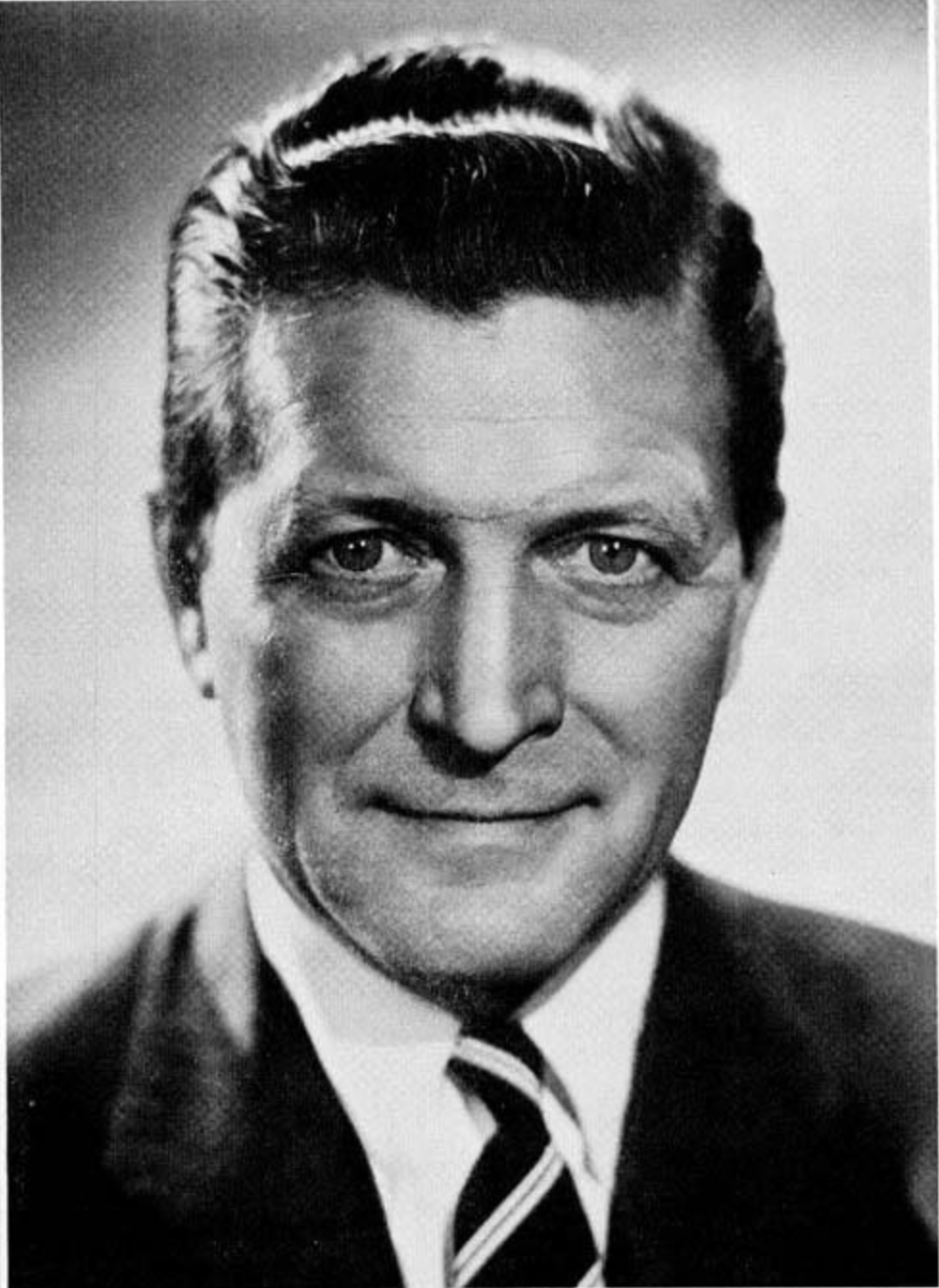

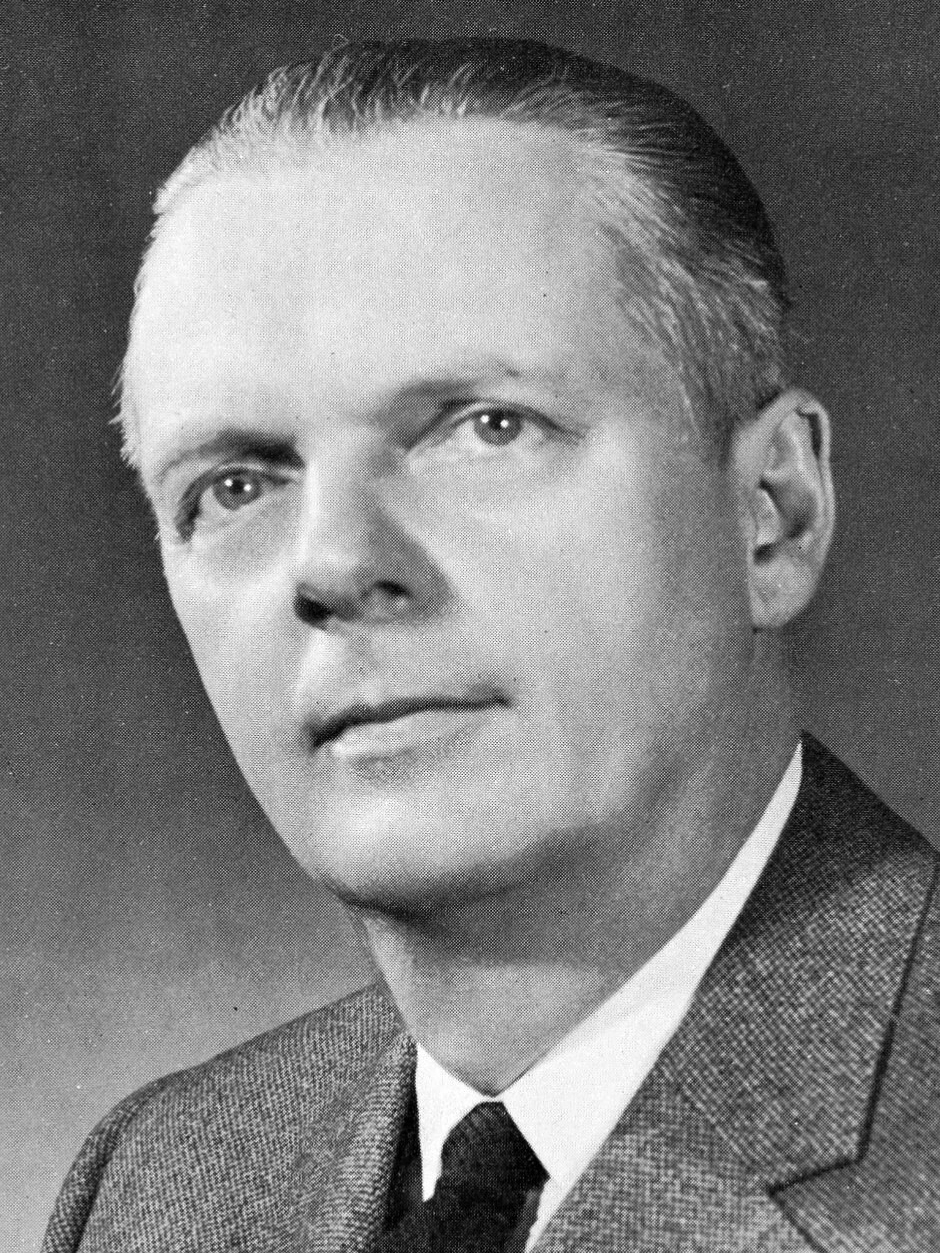
| Nominee | Otto Kerner Jr. | William Stratton |
| Party | Democratic | Republican |
| Popular vote | 2,418,394 | 2,239,095 |
| Percentage | 51.9% | 48.1% |
- County results Kerner: 50–60% 60–70% Stratton: 50–60% 60–70%
Governor before election
William Stratton
Republican
Elected Governor
Otto Kerner Jr.
Democratic

Incumbent Governor William Stratton, a Republican seeking a third term, lost reelection to Democrat Otto Kerner Jr.

==== General election ====
Gubernatorial election
| Party | Candidate | Votes | % |
|---|---|---|---|
| Democratic | Otto Kerner Jr. | 2,594,731 | 55.51 |
| Republican | William G. Stratton (incumbent) | 2,070,479 | 44.30 |
| Socialist Labor | Edward C. Cross | 8,976 | 0.19 |
| Write-in | Others | 1 | 0.00 |
| Total votes | | 4,674,187 | 100 |

=== Lieutenant governor ===
1960 Illinois lieutenant gubernatorial election
- November 8, 1960
- Turnout: 83.10%
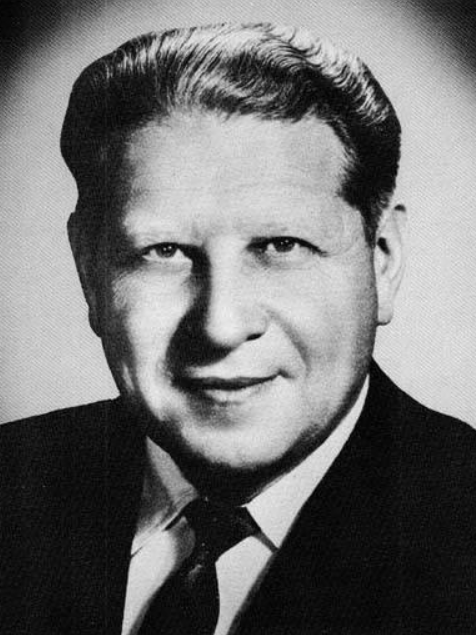

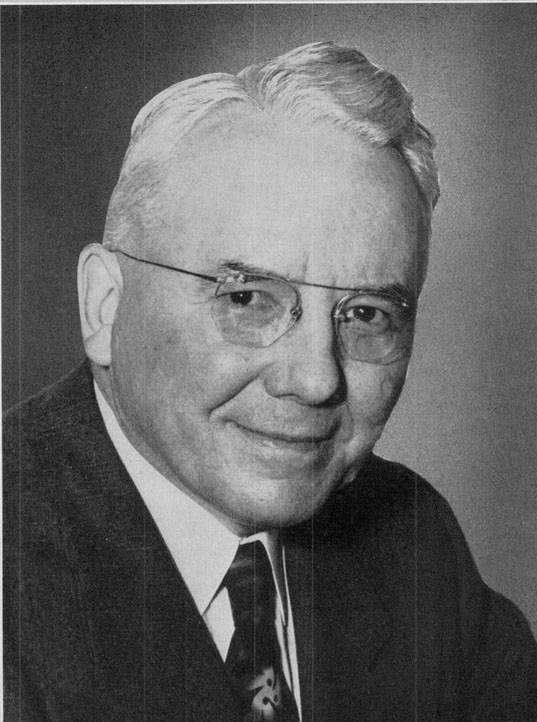
| Nominee | Samuel H. Shapiro | John William Chapman |
| Party | Democratic | Republican |
| Popular vote | 2,398,746 | 2,162,643 |
| Percentage | 52.49% | 47.32% |
- County results Shapiro: 50–60% 60–70% Chapman: 50–60% 60–70% 70–80%
Lieutenant Governor before election
John William Chapman
Republican
Elected Lieutenant Governor
Samuel H. Shapiro
Democratic

Incumbent Lieutenant Governor John William Chapman, a Republican seeking a third term, lost reelection to Democrat Samuel H. Shapiro.

==== Democratic primary ====
Lieutenant Governor Democratic primary
| Party | Candidate | Votes | % |
|---|---|---|---|
| Democratic | Samuel H. Shapiro | 559,341 | 58.49 |
| Democratic | Robert W. McGaw | 247,164 | 25.85 |
| Democratic | John L. "Jake" Wellinghoff | 149,739 | 15.66 |
| Total votes | | 956,244 | 100 |

==== Republican primary ====
Lieutenant Governor Republican primary
| Party | Candidate | Votes | % |
|---|---|---|---|
| Republican | John William Chapman (incumbent) | 592,812 | 80.01 |
| Republican | Wetzel G. Harness | 148,123 | 19.99 |
| Total votes | | 740,935 | 100 |

==== General election ====
Lieutenant Governor election
| Party | Candidate | Votes | % |
|---|---|---|---|
| Democratic | Samuel H. Shapiro | 2,398,746 | 52.49 |
| Republican | John William Chapman (incumbent) | 2,162,643 | 47.32 |
| Socialist Labor | Elizabeth Mitroff | 8,494 | 0.19 |
| Total votes | | 4,569,883 | 100 |

=== Attorney general ===
1960 Illinois Attorney General election
- November 8, 1960
- Turnout: 82.80%

| Nominee | William G. Clark | William L. Guild |
| Party | Democratic | Republican |
| Popular vote | 2,354,886 | 2,190,251 |
| Percentage | 51.72% | 48.10% |
- County results Clark: 40–50% 50–60% 60–70% Guild: 40–50% 50–60% 60–70% 70–80%
Attorney General before election
William L. Guild
Republican
Elected Attorney General
William G. Clark
Democratic

Incumbent Attorney General William L. Guild (a Republican appointed in 1960 after the death in office of Grenville Beardsley) lost to Democrat William G. Clark.

Originally, before his death, Grenville Beardsley (himself a Republican that had been appointed in 1959 after Latham Castle resigned to assume a judgeship) had been seeking reelection, having won the Republican primary.

==== Democratic primary ====
Attorney General Democratic primary
| Party | Candidate | Votes | % |
|---|---|---|---|
| Democratic | William G. Clark | 800,132 | 100 |
| Total votes | | 800,132 | 100 |

==== Republican primary ====
Attorney General Republican primary
| Party | Candidate | Votes | % |
|---|---|---|---|
| Republican | Grenville Beardsley (incumbent) | 685,967 | 100 |
| Write-in | Others | 1 | 0.00 |
| Total votes | | 685,968 | 100 |

==== General election ====
Attorney General election
| Party | Candidate | Votes | % |
|---|---|---|---|
| Democratic | William G. Clark | 2,354,886 | 51.72 |
| Republican | William L. Guild (incumbent) | 2,190,251 | 48.10 |
| Socialist Labor | George P. Milonas | 8,387 | 0.18 |
| Total votes | | 4,553,524 | 100 |

=== Secretary of State ===
1960 Illinois Secretary of State election
- November 8, 1960
- Turnout: 84.26%
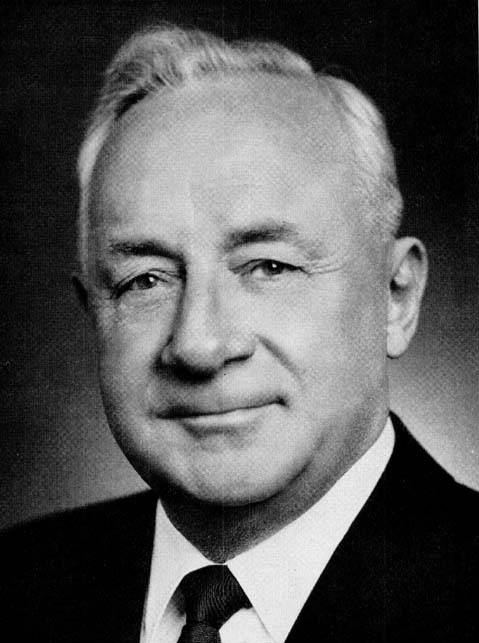

| Nominee | Charles F. Carpentier | James R. McLaughlin |
| Party | Republican | Democratic |
| Popular vote | 2,505,255 | 2,120,339 |
| Percentage | 54.06% | 45.76% |
- County results Carpentier: 50–60% 60–70% 70–80% McLaughlin: 50–60%
Secretary of State before election
Charles F. Carpentier
Republican
Elected Secretary of State
Charles F. Carpentier
Republican

Incumbent Secretary of State Charles F. Carpentier, a Republican, was reelected to a third term.

==== Democratic primary ====
Secretary of State Democratic primary
| Party | Candidate | Votes | % |
|---|---|---|---|
| Democratic | James R. McLaughlin | 810,749 | 100 |
| Total votes | | 810,749 | 100 |

==== Republican primary ====
Secretary of State Republican primary
| Party | Candidate | Votes | % |
|---|---|---|---|
| Republican | Charles F. Carpentier (incumbent) | 762,305 | 100 |
| Write-in | Others | 3 | 0.00 |
| Total votes | | 762,308 | 100 |

==== General election ====
Secretary of State election
| Party | Candidate | Votes | % |
|---|---|---|---|
| Republican | Charles F. Carpentier (incumbent) | 2,505,255 | 54.06 |
| Democratic | James R. McLaughlin | 2,120,339 | 45.76 |
| Socialist Labor | Gregory P. Lyngas | 8,234 | 0.18 |
| Total votes | | 4,633,828 | 100 |

=== Auditor of Public Accounts ===
1960 Illinois Auditor of Public Accounts election
- November 8, 1960
- Turnout: 82.79%
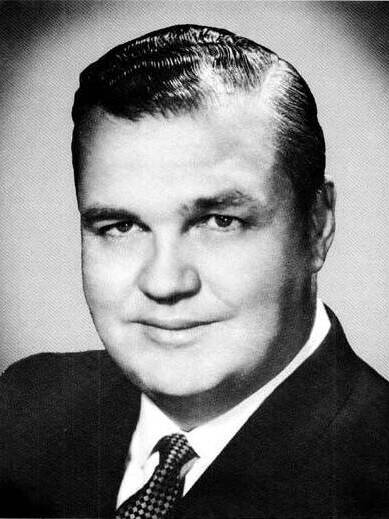

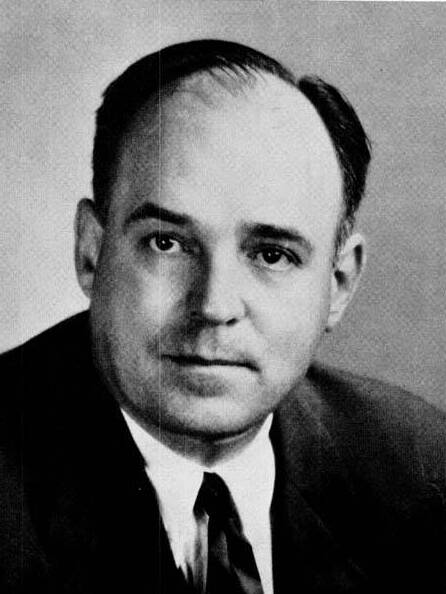
| Nominee | Michael Howlett | Elbert S. Smith |
| Party | Democratic | Republican |
| Popular vote | 2,296,220 | 2,246,833 |
| Percentage | 50.44% | 49.35 |
- County results Howlett: 40–50% 50–60% 60–70% Smith: 40–50% 50–60% 60–70% 70–80%
Auditor of Public Accounts before election
Elbert S. Smith
Republican
Elected Auditor of Public Accounts
Michael Howlett
Democratic

Incumbent Auditor of Public Accounts Elbert S. Smith, a Republican seeking a second term, lost to Democrat Michael Howlett.

==== Democratic primary ====
Auditor of Public Accounts Democratic primary
| Party | Candidate | Votes | % |
|---|---|---|---|
| Democratic | Michael J. Howlett | 792,853 | 100 |
| Total votes | | 792,853 | 100 |

==== Republican primary ====
Auditor of Public Accounts Republican primary
| Party | Candidate | Votes | % |
|---|---|---|---|
| Republican | Elbert S. Smith (incumbent) | 688,081 | 100 |
| Democratic | Write-in | 1 | 0.00 |
| Total votes | | 688,082 | 100 |

==== General election ====
Auditor of Public Accounts election
| Party | Candidate | Votes | % |
|---|---|---|---|
| Democratic | Michael J. Howlett | 2,296,220 | 50.44 |
| Republican | Elbert S. Smith (incumbent) | 2,246,833 | 49.35 |
| Socialist Labor | Stanley L. Prorok | 9,789 | 0.01 |
| Total votes | | 4,552,842 | 100 |

=== State Senate ===
Seats of the Illinois Senate were up for election in 1960. Republicans retained control of the chamber.

=== State House of Representatives ===
Seats in the Illinois House of Representatives were up for election in 1960. Republicans flipped control of the chamber.

=== Trustees of University of Illinois ===
1960 Trustees of University of Illinois election
- November 8, 1960

An election was held for three seats as Trustees of University of Illinois. All three Democratic nominees won.

Democratic incumbent Kenney E. Williamson, first appointed in 1940, won reelection to a third full (fourth overall) term. Democratic incumbent Frances Best Watkins won reelection to a third term. They were joined in winning election by fellow Democrat Irving Dillard.

Incumbent Democrat George Herrick was not nominated for reelection.

Trustees of the University of Illinois election
| Party | Candidate | Votes | % |
|---|---|---|---|
| Democratic | Irving Dillard | 2,356,777 | 17.41 |
| Democratic | Kenney E. Williamson (incumbent) | 2,335,857½ | 17.26 |
| Democratic | Frances Best Watkins (incumbent) | 2,310,181½ | 17.07 |
| Republican | C. E. "Ernie" Lovejoy | 2,199,230 | 16.25 |
| Republican | Audrey Reavis Peak | 2,172,490 | 16.05 |
| Republican | Thomas O. Matthews | 2,130,062 | 15.74 |
| Socialist Labor | Bernard Campbell | 10,065 | 0.07 |
| Socialist Labor | Margaret Deneff | 9,660 | 0.07 |
| Socialist Labor | Henery Schilling | 9,638 | 0.07 |
| Write-in | Others | 4 | 0.00 |
| Total votes | | 13,533,961 | 100 |

=== Judicial elections ===
1960 Illinois judicial elections
- June 6, 1960

Judicial elections were held in 1960.

==== Supreme Court ====
===== First Supreme Court Judicial District =====
First Supreme Court Judicial District
| Party | Candidate | Votes | % |
|---|---|---|---|
| Republican | Byron O. House (incumbent) | 59,114 | 53.69 |
| Democratic | Robert Zachariah Hickman | 50,240 | 45.63 |
| Others | Others | 744 | 0.68 |
| Total votes | | 110,098 | 100 |

===== Second Supreme Court Judicial District =====
Second Supreme Court Judicial District
| Party | Candidate | Votes | % |
|---|---|---|---|
| Democratic | Harry B. Hershey (incumbent) | 3,345 | 94.49 |
| Others | Others | 195 | 5.51 |
| Total votes | | 3,540 | 100 |

===== Third Supreme Court Judicial District =====
Third Supreme Court Judicial District
| Party | Candidate | Votes | % |
|---|---|---|---|
| Republican | George W. Bristow (incumbent) | 3,558 | 99.44 |
| Others | Others | 20 | 0.56 |
| Total votes | | 3,578 | 100 |

==== Lower courts ====
On April 12, a special election was held to fill a vacancy on the Eleventh Judicial Circuit.

=== Ballot measures ===
Two ballot measures, both of them bond issues, were put before Illinois voters in 1960.

Bond measures needed an affirmative vote equal to majority of the votes cast for whichever chamber of the Illinois General Assembly had the highest cumulative vote count. Since, in 1960, the highest legislative vote was 4,525,191, the vote count needed to be reached was at least 2,262,596 affirmative votes. The vote also needed a majority of votes cast on each measure to be affirmative.

==== Bond Issue for Education ====
Voters approved the Bond Issue for Education, which issued bonds to support improvements in education.

Bond Issue for Education
| Option | Votes | % of highest legislative vote cast |
|---|---|---|
| Yes | 2,633,869 | 58.21 |
| No | 1,266,490 | 27.98 |
| Total votes | 3,900,359 | 86.19 |
| Voter turnout | 70.92% | |

Bond results by county Yes: 80–90%; 60–70%; 50–60%; No: 70–80%; 60–70%; 50–60%

==== Bond Issue for Mental Health ====
Voters approved the Bond Issue for Mental Health, which would issue bonds to support improvements mental health and public welfare.

Bond Issue for Mental Health
| Option | Votes | % of highest legislative vote cast |
|---|---|---|
| Yes | 2,967,527 | 65.58 |
| No | 973,075 | 21.50 |
| Total votes | 3,940,602 | 87.08 |
| Voter turnout | 71.65% | |

Bond results by county Yes: 80–90%; 70–80%; 60–70%; 50–60%; No: 60–70%; 50–60%

== Local elections ==
Local elections were held.
