= Illinois Revenue Amendment =

Illinois Revenue Amendment may refer to:

- Illinois Revenue Amendment (1952)
- Illinois Revenue Amendment (1956)
- Illinois Revenue Amendment (1966)
