= Illinois General Banking Law Amendment =

Illinois Gateway Amendment may refer to:

- Illinois General Banking Law Amendment (1944)
- Illinois General Banking Law Amendment (1952)
- Illinois General Banking Law Amendment (1956)
- Illinois General Banking Law Amendment (1958)
- Illinois General Banking Law Amendment (1962)
- Illinois General Banking Law Amendment (1966)
