= Attorney General Beardsley =

Attorney General Beardsley may refer to:

- Grenville Beardsley (1898–1960), Attorney General of Illinois
- Samuel Beardsley (1790–1860), Attorney General of New York
