= Governor Shapiro =

Governor Shapiro may refer to:

- Josh Shapiro (born 1973), 48th Governor of Pennsylvania
- Samuel H. Shapiro (1907–1987), 34th Governor of Illinois
