= Michael Howlett =

American politician (1914-1992)

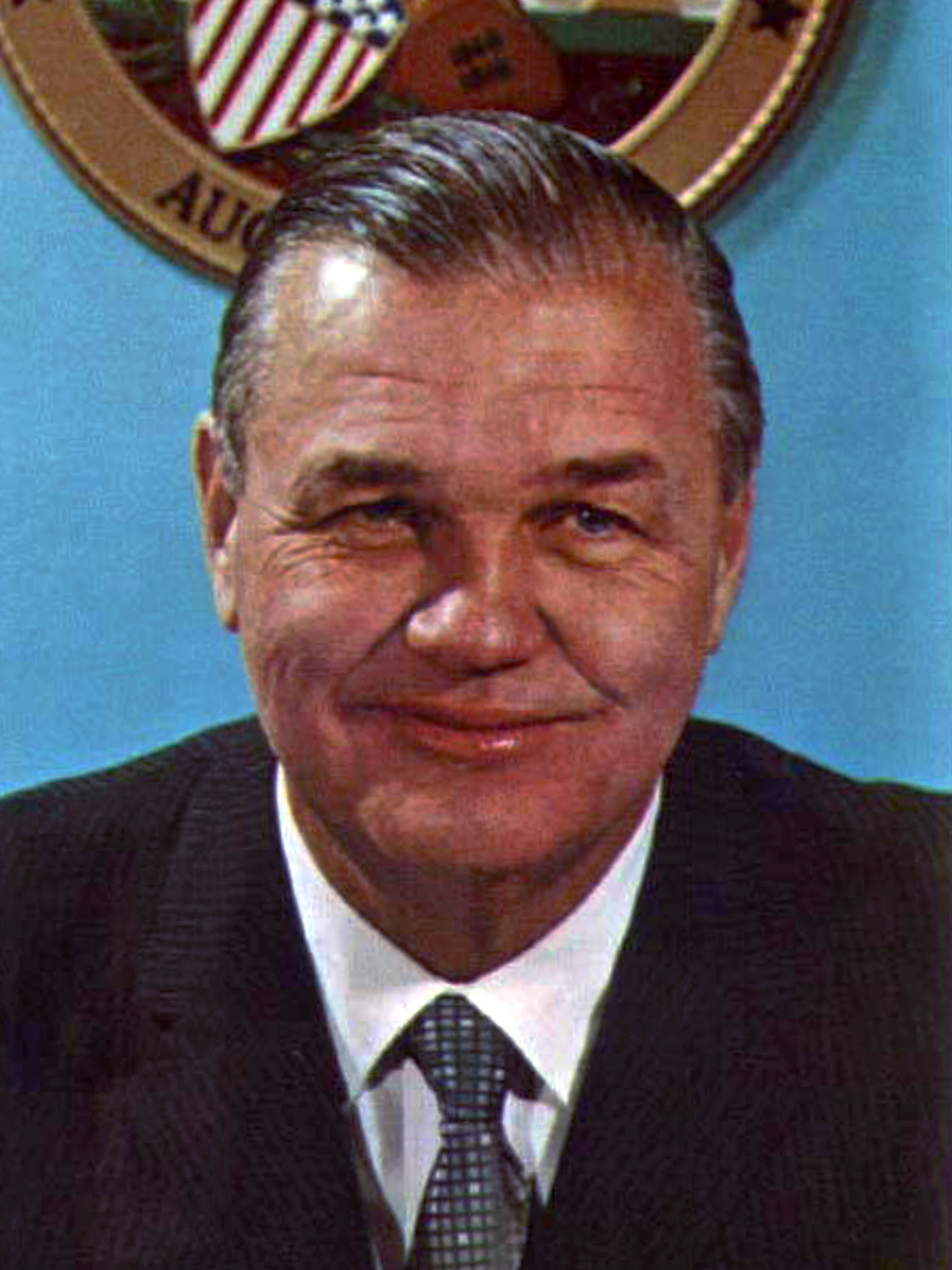
- Howlett in 1971

33rd Secretary of State of Illinois
- In office January 8, 1973 – January 10, 1977
- Governor: Dan Walker
- Preceded by: John W. Lewis Jr.
- Succeeded by: Alan J. Dixon

24th Illinois Auditor of Public Accounts
- In office January 9, 1961 – January 8, 1973
- Governor: Otto Kerner Jr.; Samuel Shapiro; Richard B. Ogilvie
- Preceded by: Elbert S. Smith
- Succeeded by: George W. Lindberg; as Illinois Comptroller

Personal details
- Born: Michael Joseph Howlett; August 30, 1914 Chicago, Illinois, U.S.
- Died: May 4, 1992 (aged 77) Chicago, Illinois, U.S.
- Party: Democratic
- Spouse: Helen Geary
- Children: 6

Military service
- Branch/service: United States Navy
- Battles/wars: World War II

Michael Joseph Howlett Sr. (August 30, 1914 – May 4, 1992) was an American politician who served as the 24th Illinois Auditor of Public Accounts and 33rd Illinois Secretary of State.

Howlett was the Democratic nominee for Governor of Illinois in the 1976 Illinois gubernatorial election, following his victory over incumbent Daniel Walker in the Democratic primary. He lost to Republican Jim Thompson in the general election.

== Early life ==
Howlett was born in Chicago, a son of Irish immigrants. Howlett was All-American water polo player, participating on ten championship teams of the Illinois Athletic Club. He graduated from St. Mel High School and briefly attended DePaul University, leaving in 1934 to become a state bank examiner.

== Career ==
=== Early career ===
In the 1930s, Howlett established an independent insurance business. He later served as Chicago-area director of the National Youth Administration, worked as an executive for the Chicago Park District, and was appointed regional director of the Economic Stabilization Agency. He later worked as a steel company executive. He served in the United States Navy during World War II.

=== Illinois Auditor ===
In 1956, Howlett ran for Illinois State Auditor and is credited with exposing incumbent Auditor Orville Hodge as having embezzled $6.15 million in state funds. While Hodge was removed from office and eventually sent to prison, Howlett lost the general election to Elbert Sidney Smith as part of a national Republican landslide. However, in the next general election, in 1960, Howlett was elected Auditor of Public Accounts (the Auditor's Office was the predecessor to the current office of Comptroller), and was re-elected twice. During Howlett's first term as Auditor, he cut the budget of the office by 20%, and returned over $600,000 of the funds stolen by Hodge to the state treasury.

In 1972, Howlett was elected Illinois Secretary of State, becoming the first Democratic state officer to win four consecutive statewide elections.

=== 1976 Illinois gubernatorial campaign ===
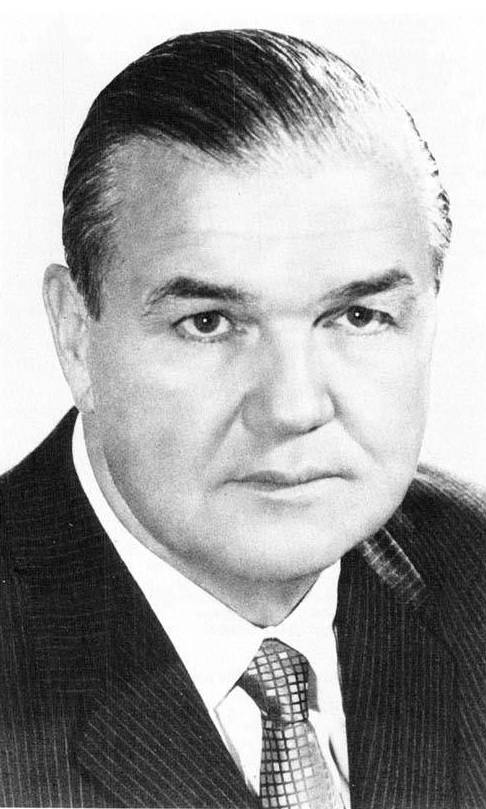
Howlett, circa 1976

Howlett was prepared to run for re-election in 1976, but was encouraged by Cook County Democrats to challenge incumbent Governor Dan Walker for the Democratic nomination in 1976. Howlett defeated Walker in the March primary, and stood as the Democratic nominee for governor of Illinois in the general election, whereupon he was defeated by Republican nominee James R. Thompson.

Throughout the campaign, Howlett was dogged by conflict of interest charges, first raised by Walker, over payments Howlett received as an executive at Sun Steel Company. A report issued by former Illinois Supreme Court Justice Marvin Burt at the behest of Republican state Attorney General William J. Scott was highly critical of Howlett. However, a Cook County judge ruled no conflict of interest had arisen, and cleared Howlett. Thompson, who successfully prosecuted former Illinois governor Otto Kerner Jr., continued to hammer the issue during the general election campaign, and attacked Howlett as corrupt, and Attorney General Scott vowed to appeal the judge's ruling. Ironically, it was Scott who later was forced to resign after a felony conviction.

Early polls of the contest had Howlett in the lead, although Thompson had nearly closed the gap by the time of the primary. However, Walker's attacks during the bitter primary weakened Howlett, and by August, Thompson held a slim lead in the polls. His lead expanded during the campaign, and Howlett ended up losing by 30 percentage points (nearly 1.4 million votes), the widest margin of defeat for any Democratic nominee for governor of Illinois in history. Thompson was the first candidate for governor to receive over 3 million votes, and his tally of 3,000,395 remains the highest number of votes ever cast for a candidate in an election for governor of Illinois.

=== Retirement ===
After his loss in the 1976 governor's race, Howlett opened a private consulting business.

Howlett would later see his son run for statewide office through bizarre circumstances. In the 1986 Democratic primary for lieutenant governor, former U.S. Senator Adlai Stevenson III and the Democratic Party selected State senator George E. Sangmeister as the party-preferred candidate, however he narrowly lost the primary to Mark Fairchild (a Lyndon LaRouche activist). After LaRouche followers had won the Democratic nominations for both Lieutenant Governor and Secretary of State, Stevenson refused to run as the Democratic standard-bearer, and formed the Solidarity Party. When Sangmeister was unwilling to run with Stevenson in the fall, Howlett's son Michael J. Howlett Jr., then a Cook County judge, was nominated by the Solidarity Party. Stevenson-Howlett went down to defeat in the fall, with only 40% of the vote. Another son, Edward G. Howlett, was the unsuccessful Republican nominee for Chicago City Clerk in 1995.

== Death and legacy ==
Howlett died in Chicago's Mercy Hospital of chronic kidney failure. He had suffered a stroke three months earlier and remained hospitalized from then until his death.

The building housing the offices of the Illinois Secretary of State in Springfield, Illinois, formerly known as the Centennial Building, is named after Howlett.

== Election history ==
1976 gubernatorial election, Illinois
Party	Candidate	Votes	%	±%
Republican	James R. Thompson	3,000,395	64.68	+15.66
Democratic	Michael Howlett	1,610,258	34.71	−15.97
Libertarian	F. Joseph McCaffrey	7,552	0.16	
Communist Party (US)	Ishmael Flory	10,091	0.22	+0.12
	Others	10,375	0.23	
Majority		1,390,137	29.93	
Turnout		4,638,671		
Republican gain from Democratic		Swing		

Year	Office	Election	Subject	Party	Votes	%	Opponent	Party	Votes	%
1976	Governor of Illinois	Primary	Michael Howlett	Democratic	811,721	53.82	Dan Walker (Inc.)	Democratic	696,380	46.18
1972	Illinois Secretary of State	General	Michael Howlett	Democratic	2,360,327	51.69	Edmund J. Kucharski	Republican	2,187,544	47.91
1968	Illinois Auditor of Public Accounts	General	Michael Howlett (Inc.)	Democratic	2,215,401	50.99	William C. Harris	Republican	2,106,676	48.49
1964	Illinois Auditor of Public Accounts	General	Michael Howlett (Inc.)	Democratic	2,513,831	55.47	John Kirby	Republican	2,017,951	44.53
1960	Illinois Auditor of Public Accounts	General	Michael Howlett	Democratic	2,296,220	50.44	Elbert S. Smith (Inc.)	Republican	2,246,833	49.35
1956	Illinois Auditor of Public Accounts	General	Michael Howlett	Democratic	1,992,707	47.23	Elbert S. Smith	Republican	2,217,229	52.55
1950	Illinois Treasurer	General	Michael Howlett	Democratic	1,568,763	44.32	William G. Stratton	Republican	1,959,734	55.36

== Sources ==
- Chicago Tribune Historical Archive online (May 5, 1992), retrieved April 28, 2007.
- Illinois Comptroller web site - History of the Office - Howlett
- "Howlett v. Thompson," Illinois Issues, November 1976
- 1975-1976 Illinois Blue Book p40

Political offices
Preceded by Elbert S. Smith	Illinois Auditor of Public Accounts; 1961–1973	Succeeded by George W. Lindberg as Illinois Comptroller
Preceded by John W. Lewis	Illinois Secretary of State; 1973–1977	Succeeded by Alan J. Dixon
Party political offices
Preceded by Ora Smith	Democratic nominee for Treasurer of Illinois; 1950	Succeeded by Fred A. Cain
Preceded by Benjamin O. Cooper	Democratic nominee for Illinois Auditor of Public Accounts; 1956, 1960, 1964, 1968	Succeeded by None
Preceded by Paul Powell	Democratic nominee for Secretary of State of Illinois; 1972	Succeeded by Alan J. Dixon
Preceded by Daniel Walker	Democratic Nominee for Governor of Illinois; 1976	Succeeded by Michael Bakalis
