= 1964 Illinois gubernatorial election =

- November 3, 1964
- Turnout: 84.15% ▼0.84 pp
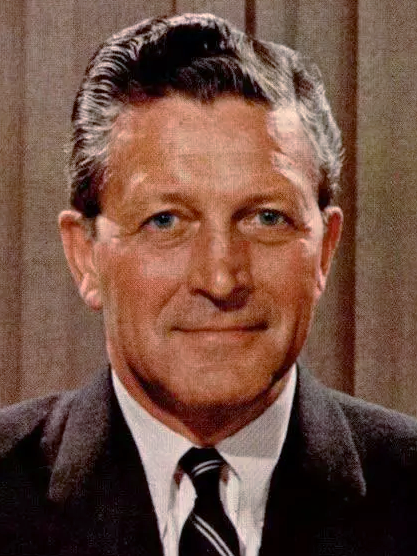

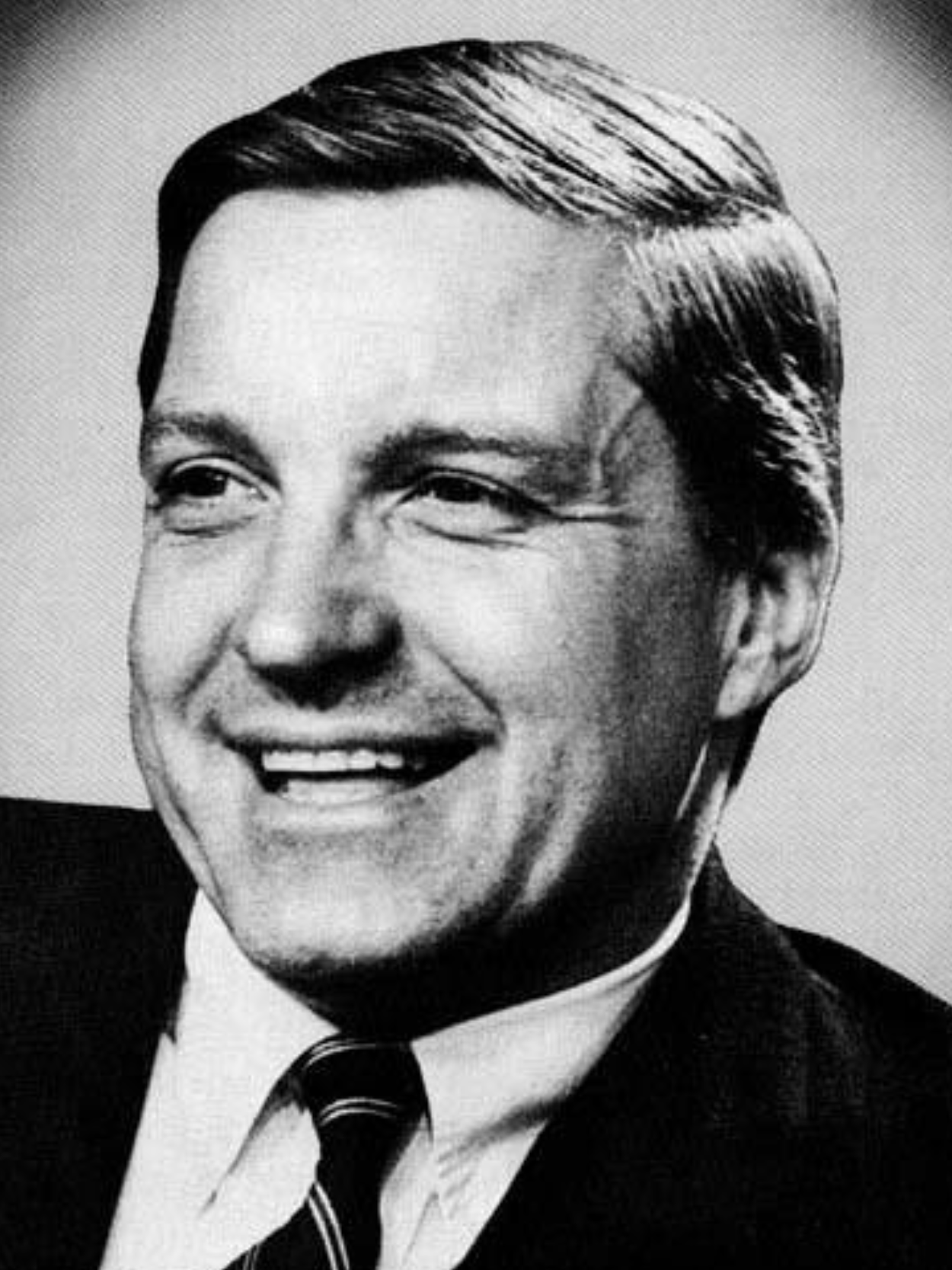
Nominee	Otto Kerner Jr.	Charles H. Percy
Party	Democratic	Republican
Popular vote	2,418,394	2,239,095
Percentage	51.93%	48.08%
- County results Kerner: 50–60% 60–70% Percy: 50–60% 60–70%
Governor before election
Otto Kerner Jr.
Democratic
Elected Governor
Otto Kerner Jr.
Democratic

The 1964 Illinois gubernatorial election was held in Illinois on November 3, 1964. The Democratic nominee, incumbent Governor Otto Kerner Jr., won reelection against the Republican nominee, Charles H. Percy.

== Background ==
The primaries and general election both coincided with those for federal offices (United States President and congress) and those for other state offices. The election was part of the 1964 Illinois elections.

In the primary election, turnout was 37.89% with 1,956,238 votes cast. In the general election, turnout was 84.15% with 4,657,500 votes cast.

== Democratic primary ==
The Democratic primary was held on April 14, 1964. Incumbent governor Otto Kerner Jr. won without opposition.

=== Candidates ===
- Otto Kerner Jr., incumbent Governor since 1961

==== Declined ====
- Sargent Shriver, director of the Peace Corps and former President of the Chicago Board of Education

Sargent Shriver had considered a possible run, but opted against a campaign after President Lyndon B. Johnson asked him to remain in Washington to assist with Great Society programs.

=== Results ===
1964 Democratic gubernatorial primary, Illinois
Party	Candidate	Votes	%
Democratic	Otto Kerner Jr. (incumbent)	917,455	99.98
Write-in		161	0.02
Majority		917,294	99.96
Total votes		917,616	100

== Republican primary ==
The Republican primary was also held on April 14. Business executive Charles Percy won the nomination against Illinois state treasurer William Scott, and a field of minor candidates.

=== Candidates ===
- Charles H. Percy, president of Bell & Howell and former advisor to Dwight D. Eisenhower and Nelson Rockefeller
- Barnept J. "Barney" Neidle
- William J. Scott, Treasurer of Illinois since 1963
- Alfred A. Skallish

==== Withdrew ====
- Charles F. Carpentier, Secretary of State
- Hayes Robertson, chair of the Cook County Republican Party and candidate for governor in 1960 (endorsed Scott)

=== Campaign ===
Illinois secretary of state Charles F. Carpentier was originally running, but dropped-out in January after suffering a heart attack. Also originally running was Cook County Republican Party chairman Hayes Robertson, who had unsuccessfully challenged William Stratton in the 1960 Republican gubernatorial primary. Robertson also withdrew in January, throwing his support behind Scott.

=== Results ===
1964 Republican gubernatorial primary, Illinois
Party	Candidate	Votes	%
Republican	Charles H. Percy	626,111	60.28
Republican	William J. Scott	388,903	37.44
Republican	Lar "America First" Daly	9,228	0.89
Republican	Barnept J. "Barney" Neidle	6,508	0.63
Republican	Alfred A. Skallish	7,661	0.74
Write-in		211	0.02
Majority		237,208	22.84
Total votes		1,038,622	100

== General election ==
1964 gubernatorial election, Illinois
Party	Candidate	Votes	%	±%
Democratic	Otto Kerner Jr. (incumbent)	2,418,394	51.92	−3.58
Republican	Charles H. Percy	2,239,095	48.08	+3.78
Write-in		11	0.00	N/A
Majority		179,095	3.85	−7.37
Turnout		4,657,500	84.15	
Democratic hold		Swing		
