= Elbert S. Smith =

American politician and lawyer (1911-1983)

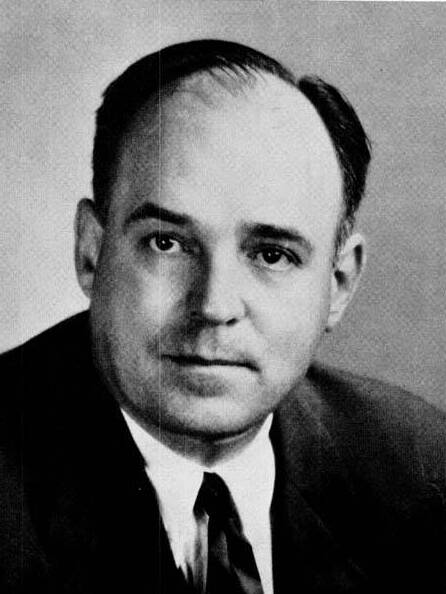
- Official portrait, 1957

23rd Illinois Auditor of Public Accounts
- In office 1957–1961
- Preceded by: Lloyd Morey
- Succeeded by: Michael Howlett

Member of the Illinois Senate
- In office 1949–1957

Personal details
- Born: Elbert Sidney Smith; October 27, 1911 Sangamon County, Illinois, U.S.
- Died: April 7, 1983 (aged 71) Decatur, Illinois, U.S.
- Party: Republican
- Education: Millikin University; University of Alabama
- Occupation: Politician, lawyer

Military service
- Allegiance: United States
- Branch/service: United States Navy
- Battles/wars: World War II

Elbert Sidney Smith (October 27, 1911 – April 7, 1983) was an American politician and lawyer.

Born, on a farm, in Sangamon County, Illinois. Smith was educated in the Decatur, Illinois public schools. He went to Millikin University and then received his law degree from University of Alabama School of Law 1936. Smith practiced law in Decatur, Illinois. During World War II, Smith served in the United States Navy. From 1949 to 1957, Smith served in the Illinois State Senate and was a Republican. Smith then served as Illinois Auditor of Public Accounts from 1957 to 1961. Smith served in the 6th Illinois Constitutional Convention of 1969-1970 and was a vice president of the convention. Smith died in a hospital in Decatur, Illinois.

== Notes ==
Party political offices
Preceded by Orville Hodge	Republican nominee for Illinois Auditor of Public Accounts; 1956, 1960	Succeeded by John Kirby
Political offices
Preceded by Lloyd Morey	Illinois Auditor of Public Accounts; 1957–1961	Succeeded by Michael J. Howlett
