= Charles F. Carpentier =

American businessman and politician (1896–1964)

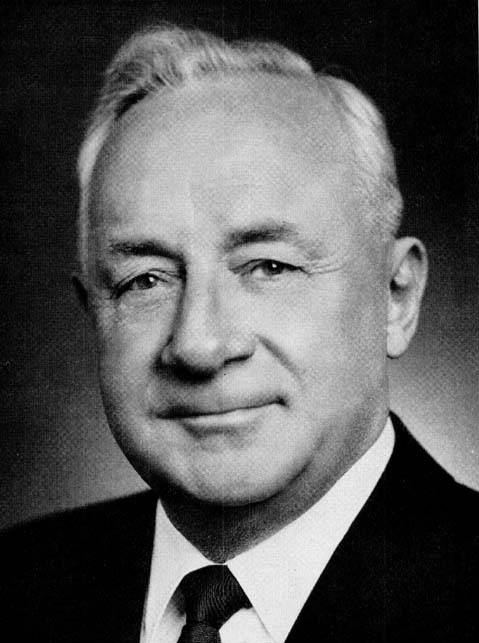
- official portrait, circa 1957

29th Secretary of State of Illinois
- In office 1953–1964
- Governor: William Stratton
- Preceded by: Edward J. Barrett
- Succeeded by: William H. Chamberlain

Member of the Illinois Senate from the 33rd district
- In office 1939–1953
- Succeeded by: Morris E. Muhleman

Mayor of East Moline
- In office 1930–1939

Member of the East Moline City Council

Personal details
- Born: September 19, 1896 Moline, Illinois, U.S.
- Died: April 3, 1964 (aged 67) Springfield, Illinois, U.S.
- Party: Republican
- Children: Donald D. Carpentier
- Education: St. Ambrose University

Military service
- Branch/service: United States Army
- Battles/wars: World War I

Charles Francis Carpentier (September 19, 1896 – April 3, 1964) was an American businessman and politician.

== Biography ==
Carpentier was born in Moline, Illinois, on September 19, 1896.

Carpentier was in the United States Army during World War I. He went to St. Ambrose University. With his brother, he owned and operated movie theaters and drive-in movie theaters in the Quad Cities area. In 1924, he was elected to the East Moline City Council. In 1929, he was elected mayor of East Moline. In 1938, he was elected to the Illinois State Senate as a Republican. Then, in 1952, he was elected Illinois Secretary of State, a post he held until his death in 1964.

While running for governor of Illinois in the state's 1964 gubernatorial election, Carpentier suffered a heart attack and withdrew from the race. He died on April 3, 1964, in Springfield, Illinois, of another heart attack.

== Legacy ==
Carpentier's son, Donald D. Carpentier, was also in the Illinois General Assembly.

Party political offices
| Preceded by William Stratton | Republican nominee for Secretary of State of Illinois; 1952, 1956, 1960 | Succeeded by Elmer J. Hoffman |
Political offices
| Preceded by Edward J. Barrett | Illinois Secretary of State; 1953–1964 | Succeeded by William H. Chamberlain |
