= Elmer Hoffman =

American politician (1899–1976)

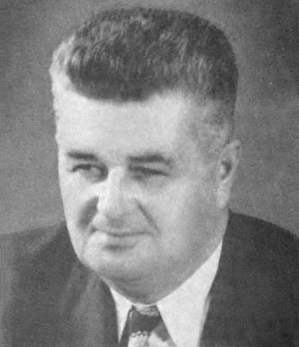
- Hoffman, circa 1963

Member of the U.S. House of Representatives from Illinois's 14th district
- In office January 3, 1959 – January 3, 1965
- Preceded by: Russell W. Keeney
- Succeeded by: John N. Erlenborn

57th and 59th Treasurer of Illinois
- In office January 14, 1957 – January 3, 1959
- Governor: William G. Stratton
- Preceded by: Warren Wright
- Succeeded by: Joseph D. Lohman
- In office January 12, 1953 – January 10, 1955
- Governor: William G. Stratton
- Preceded by: William G. Stratton
- Succeeded by: Warren Wright

Personal details
- Born: Elmer Joseph Hoffman; July 7, 1899 DuPage County, Illinois, U.S.
- Died: June 25, 1976 (aged 76) Wheaton, Illinois, U.S.
- Party: Republican

Military service
- Allegiance: United States
- Branch/service: United States Army
- Unit: Field Artillery Corps
- Battles/wars: World War I

Elmer Joseph Hoffman (July 7, 1899 – June 25, 1976) was an American businessman, law enforcement officer, politician, and World War I veteran who served three terms as a U.S. Representative from Illinois from 1959 to 1965.

== Biography ==
Born on a farm in DuPage County, near Wheaton, Illinois, Hoffman attended the public schools of Wheaton. He enlisted in the Artillery Corps during the World War I and served in France. After the war, he helped operate his father's farm as well as his own trucking firm from 1919 to 1930.

=== Law enforcement ===
He was employed in Du Page County sheriff's office from 1930 to 1938. He was sheriff of Du Page County from 1939 to 1942. He served as chief deputy sheriff from 1943 to 1946, and then became sheriff again, from 1947 to 1950. In 1951 he was a probation officer of Du Page County's circuit and county courts.

=== Political career ===
Hoffman was elected State treasurer in 1952, reelected in 1956 and served until elected to Congress.

==== Congress ====
Hoffman was elected as a Republican to the Eighty-sixth and to the two succeeding Congresses (January 3, 1959 – January 3, 1965). Hoffman voted in favor of the Civil Rights Acts of 1960 and 1964, as well as the 24th Amendment to the U.S. Constitution. He was not a candidate for renomination in 1964 to the Eighty-ninth Congress.

== Retirement and death ==
Hoffman resided in Wheaton, Illinois, where he died June 25, 1976. He was interred in St. Michael's Cemetery.

Party political offices
Preceded by William Stratton	Republican nominee for Illinois Treasurer; 1952	Succeeded by Warren Wright
Preceded by Warren Wright	Republican nominee for Illinois Treasurer; 1956	Succeeded by Warren Wright
Preceded by Charles F. Carpentier	Republican nominee for Secretary of State of Illinois; 1964	Succeeded by Donald D. Carpentier
Political offices
Preceded by William Stratton	Treasurer of Illinois; 1953–1955	Succeeded by Warren Wright
Preceded by Warren Wright	Treasurer of Illinois; 1957–1959	Succeeded by Joseph D. Lohman
U.S. House of Representatives
Preceded by Russell W. Keeney	Member of the U.S. House of Representatives from Illinois's 14th congressional district 1959-1965	Succeeded by John N. Erlenborn
