= John William Chapman =

American politician

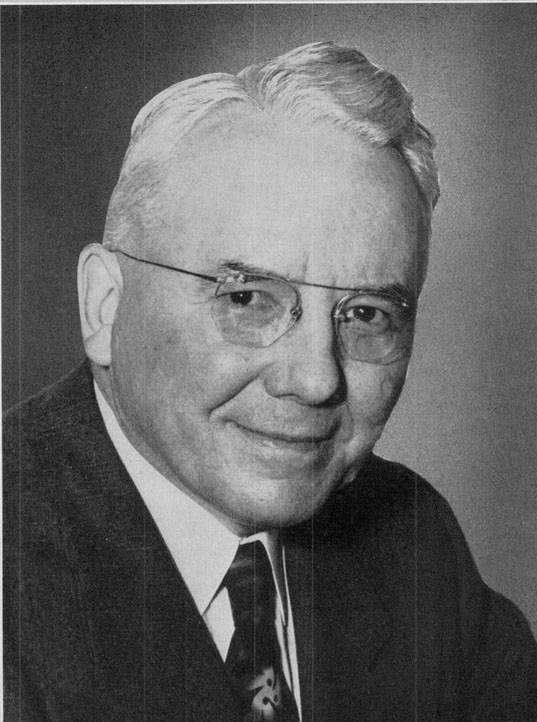
- official portrait, 1953

37th Lieutenant Governor of Illinois
- In office January 12, 1953 – January 9, 1961
- Governor: William Stratton
- Preceded by: Sherwood Dixon
- Succeeded by: Samuel H. Shapiro

Member of the Chicago City Council from the 40th Ward
- In office 1927–1929
- Preceded by: Christ A. Jensen
- Succeeded by: Joseph C. Ross

Personal details
- Born: September 8, 1894 Crete, Nebraska, U.S.
- Died: August 17, 1978 (aged 83) Broward County, Florida, U.S.
- Party: Republican
- Spouse: Eva Richolson
- Profession: Attorney and Politician

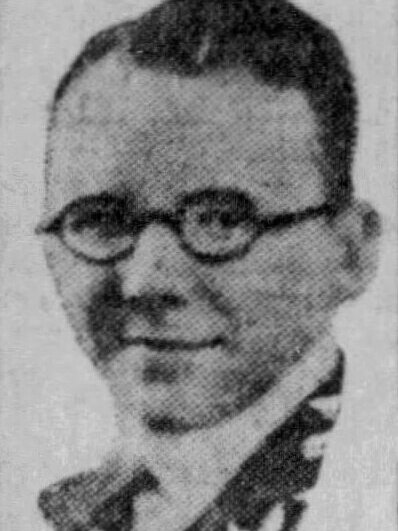
Chapman, circa 1927

John William Chapman (September 8, 1894 – August 17, 1978) was the 37th Lieutenant Governor of Illinois. Chapman was born in Crete, Nebraska on September 8, 1894. Chapman attended Public school in Chicago. He graduated from the University of Chicago in 1915 and received a J.D. degree from University of Chicago Law School in 1917. He entered private practice in Chicago in the 1920s until he moved to Springfield, Illinois in 1941. In 1927, he was elected an Alderman on the Chicago City Council for the 40th ward and served for one term before losing to Joseph C. Ross in 1929. He served as executive secretary to Illinois Governor Dwight H. Green from 1941 to 1949. In 1941 he was appointed to the Illinois Parole Board serving until March 1950. He was elected Lieutenant Governor of Illinois and served from 1953 to 1961. He died August 17, 1978, in Broward County, Florida and was cremated.

Party political offices
Preceded by Richard Yates Rowe	Republican nominee for Lieutenant Governor of Illinois; 1952, 1956, 1960	Succeeded by John Altorfer
Political offices
Preceded by Sherwood Dixon	Lieutenant Governor of Illinois; 1953 – 1961	Succeeded by Samuel H. Shapiro
Preceded by Christ A. Jensen	City of Chicago Alderman; 40th Ward; 1927 – 1929	Succeeded by Joseph C. Ross
