= 1956 Illinois elections =

- November 6, 1956
- Turnout: 85.95%

Elections were held in Illinois on Tuesday, November 6, 1956.

Primaries were held on April 10, 1956.

The results strongly favored the Republican Party, which retained control both chambers of the Illinois General Assembly as well as all statewide elected executive offices. They also won the state in the presidential election, retained the U.S. Senate seat up for election, and flipped a single U.S. House seat.

== Election information ==
=== Turnout ===
In the primary election turnout was 36.96%, with a total of 1,839,577 ballots cast (961,999 Democratic and 877,578 Republican).

In the general election turnout was 85.95%, with a total of 4,484,956 ballots cast.

== Federal elections ==
=== United States President ===
Illinois voted for the Republican ticket of Dwight D. Eisenhower and Richard Nixon. For the second consecutive election, Illinois' vote for the Republican Eisenhower-Nixon ticket came despite the fact that former Illinois Governor Adlai Stevenson II was the Democratic presidential nominee.

=== United States Senate ===
Republican Senator Everett Dirksen was reelected to a second term.

=== United States House ===
All 25 Illinois seats in the United States House of Representatives were up for election in 1956.

The Republicans flipped one Democratic-held seat, leaving the composition of Illinois' House delegation to consist of 14 Republicans and 11 Democrats.

== State elections ==
=== Governor ===
1956 Illinois gubernatorial election
- November 6, 1956
- Turnout: 82.69%
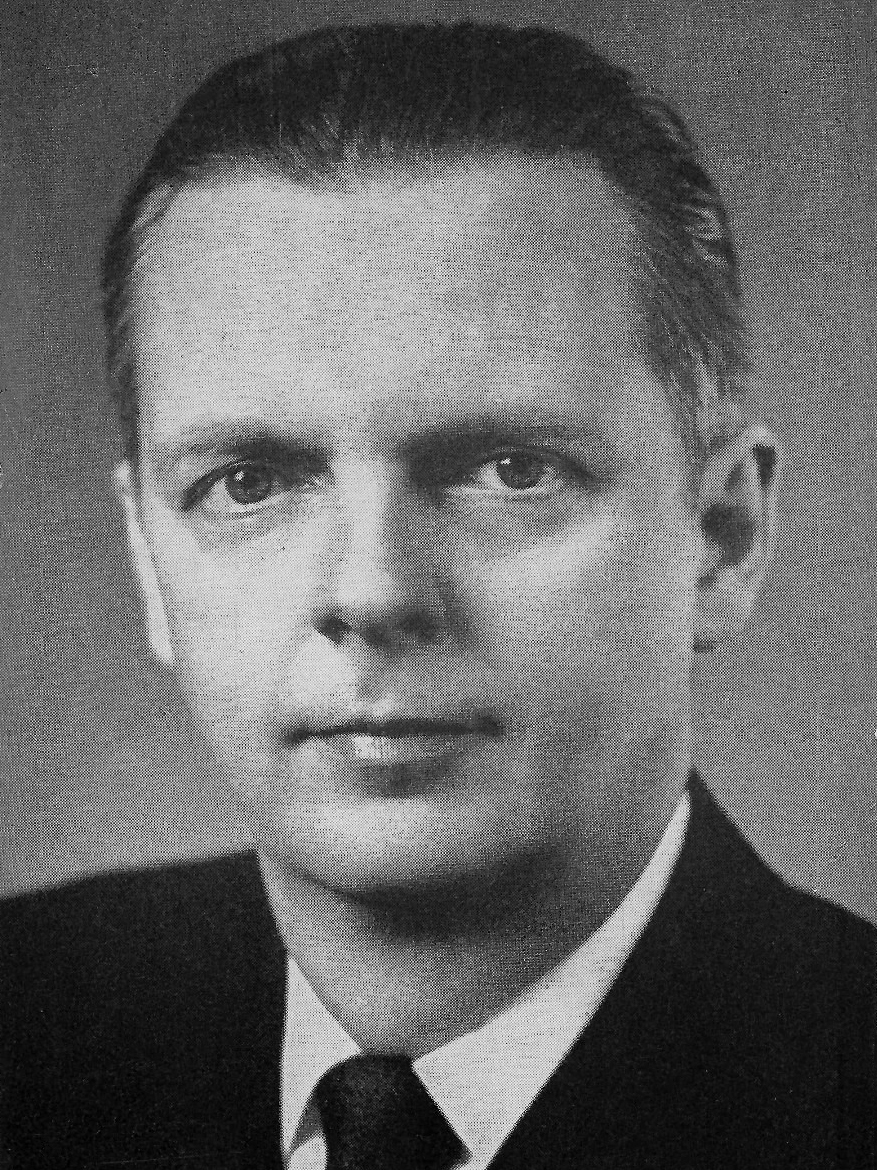

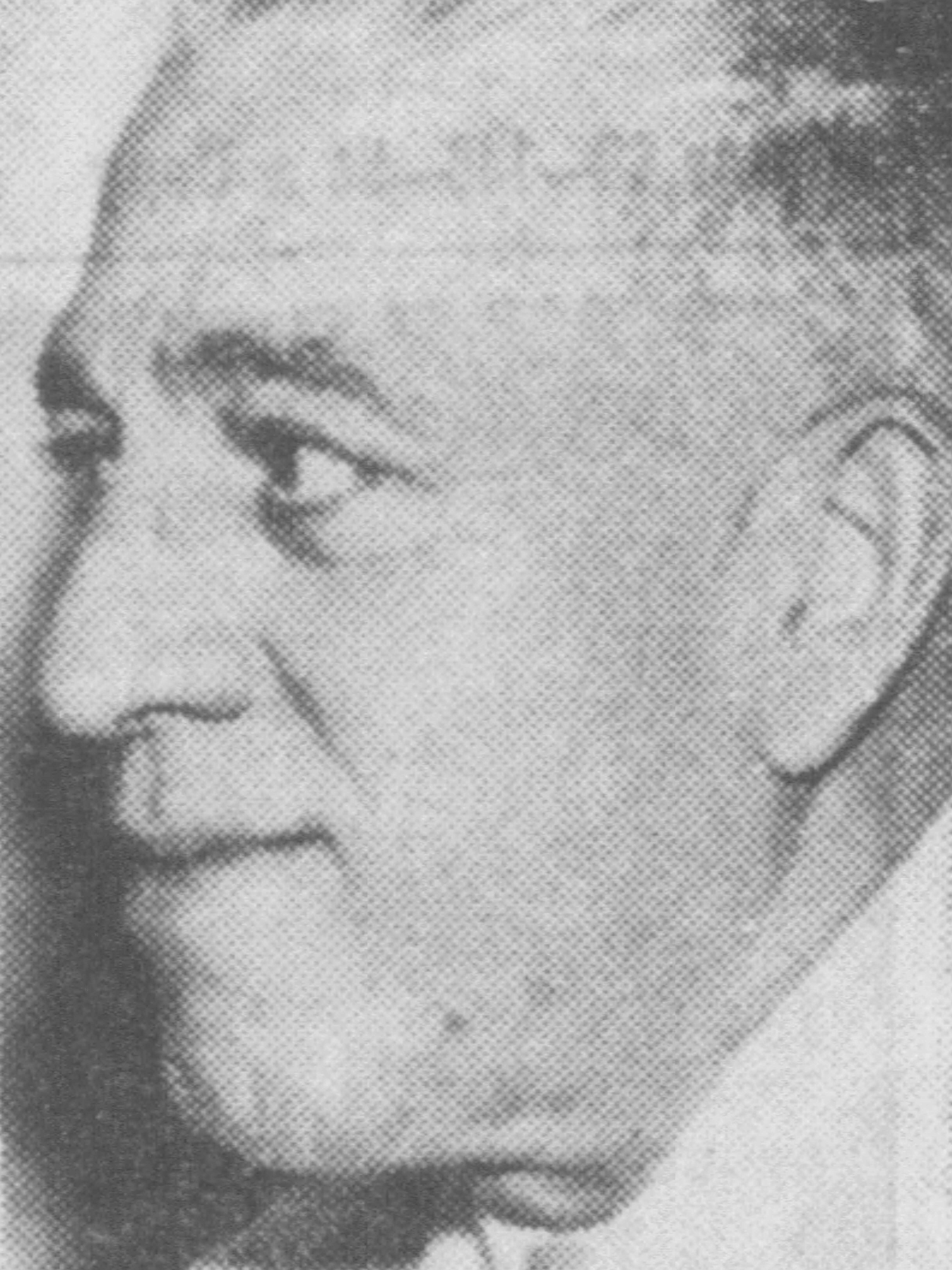
Nominee	William Stratton	Richard B. Austin
Party	Republican	Democratic
Popular vote	2,171,786	2,134,909
Percentage	50.34%	49.48%
- County results Stratton: 50–60% 60–70% 70–80% Austin: 40–50% 50–60% 60–70%
Governor before election
William Stratton
Republican
Elected Governor
William Stratton
Republican

Incumbent Governor William Stratton, a Republican, narrowly won reelection to a second term.

==== General election ====
Herbert C. Paschen (winner of the Democratic primary) withdrew and was replaced by Richard B. Austin as Democratic nominee.

Gubernatorial election
Party	Candidate	Votes	%
Republican	William G. Stratton (incumbent)	2,171,786	50.34
Democratic	Richard B. Austin	2,134,909	49.48
Socialist Labor	Edward C. Cross	7,874	0.18
Write-in	Others	42	0.00
Total votes		4,314,611	100

=== Lieutenant governor ===
1956 Illinois lieutenant gubernatorial election
- November 6, 1956
- Turnout: 80.74%
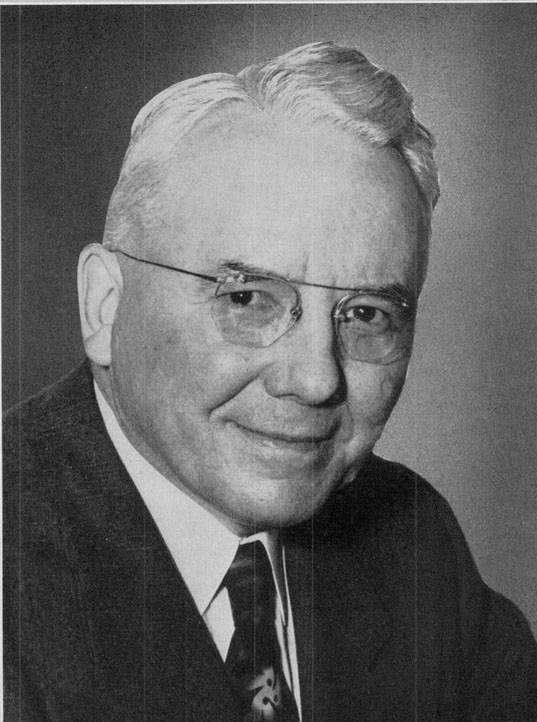

Nominee	John William Chapman	Roscoe Bonjean
Party	Republican	Democratic
Popular vote	2,240,542	1,964,722
Percentage	53.18%	46.64%
- County results Chapman: 50–60% 60–70% 70–80% Bonjean: 50–60% 60–70%
Lieutenant Governor before election
John William Chapman
Republican
Elected Lieutenant Governor
John William Chapman
Republican

Incumbent lieutenant governor John William Chapman, a Republican, won reelection to a second term.

==== Democratic primary ====
Lieutenant Governor Democratic primary
Party	Candidate	Votes	%
Democratic	Roscoe Bonjean	441,873	63.15
Democratic	James L. Griffin	257,884	36.85
Write-in	Others	5	0.00
Total votes		699,762	100

==== Republican primary ====
Lieutenant Governor Republican primary
Party	Candidate	Votes	%
Republican	John William Chapman (incumbent)	655,018	100
Write-in	Others	4	0.00
Total votes		655,022	100

==== General election ====
Lieutenant Governor election
Party	Candidate	Votes	%
Republican	John William Chapman (incumbent)	2,240,542	53.18
Democratic	Roscoe Bonjean	1,964,722	46.64
Socialist Labor	Frank Schnur	7,540	0.18
Total votes		4,212,804	100

=== Attorney general ===
1956 Illinois Attorney General election
- November 6, 1956
- Turnout: 80.92%
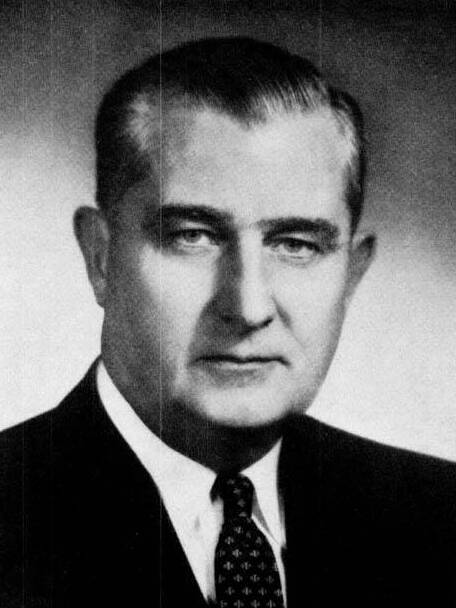

Nominee	Latham Castle	James L. O'Keefe
Party	Republican	Democratic
Popular vote	2,310,346	1,904,439
Percentage	54.72%	45.11%
- County results Castle: 50–60% 60–70% 70–80% O'Keefe: 50–60% 60–70%
Attorney General before election
William L. Guild
Republican
Elected Attorney General
William G. Clark
Democratic

Incumbent attorney general Latham Castle, a Republican, was elected to a second term.

==== Democratic primary ====
Attorney General Democratic primary
Party	Candidate	Votes	%
Democratic	James L. O'Keefe	651,226	100
Write-in	Others	1	0.00
Total votes		651,227	100

==== Republican primary ====
Attorney General Republican primary
Party	Candidate	Votes	%
Republican	Latham Castle (incumbent)	655,115	100
Democratic	Write-in	4	0.00
Total votes		655,119	100

==== General election ====
Attorney General election
Party	Candidate	Votes	%
Republican	Latham Castle (incumbent)	2,310,346	54.72
Democratic	James L. O'Keefe	1,904,439	45.11
Socialist Labor	George P. Milonas	7,460	0.18
Total votes		4,222,245	100

=== Secretary of State ===
1960 Illinois Secretary of State election
- November 6, 1956
- Turnout: 81.89%
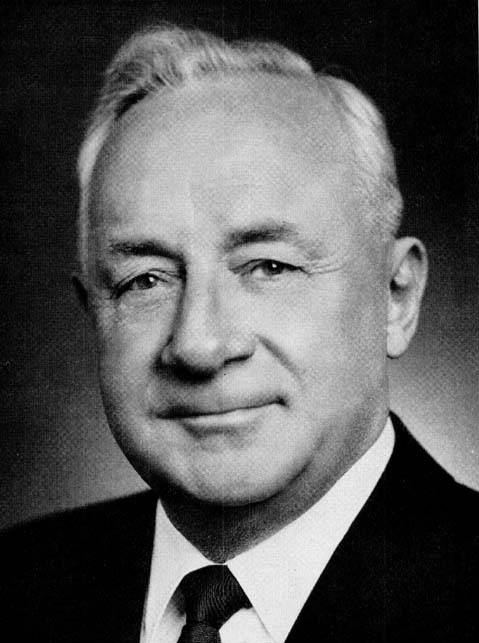

Nominee	Charles F. Carpentier	David F. Mallet
Party	Republican	Democratic
Popular vote	2,432,954	1,832,677
Percentage	56.94%	42.89%
- County results Carpentier: 50–60% 60–70% 70–80% Mallet: 50–60% 60–70%
Secretary of State before election
Charles F. Carpentier
Republican
Elected Secretary of State
Charles F. Carpentier
Republican

Incumbent Secretary of State Charles F. Carpentier, a Republican, was reelected to a second term.

==== Democratic primary ====
Secretary of State Democratic primary
Party	Candidate	Votes	%
Democratic	David F. Mallet	650,286	100
Democratic	Write-in	2	0.00
Total votes		650,288	100

==== Republican primary ====
Secretary of State Republican primary
Party	Candidate	Votes	%
Republican	Charles F. Carpentier (incumbent)	609,658	80.18
Republican	Nicholas J. Bohling	150,704	19.82
Write-in	Others	1	0.00
Total votes		760,363	100

==== General election ====
Secretary of State election
Party	Candidate	Votes	%
Republican	Charles F. Carpentier (incumbent)	2,432,954	56.94
Democratic	David F. Mallet	1,832,677	42.89
Socialist Labor	Gregory P. Lyngas	7,260	0.17
Write-in	Others	1	0.00
Total votes		4,272,892	100

=== Auditor of Public Accounts ===
1956 Illinois Auditor of Public Accounts election
- November 6, 1956
- Turnout: 80.87%
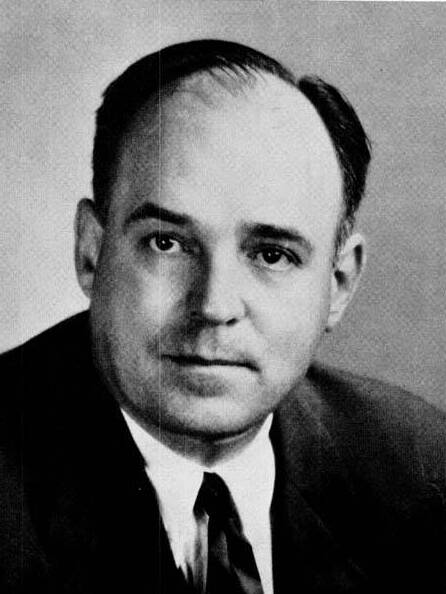

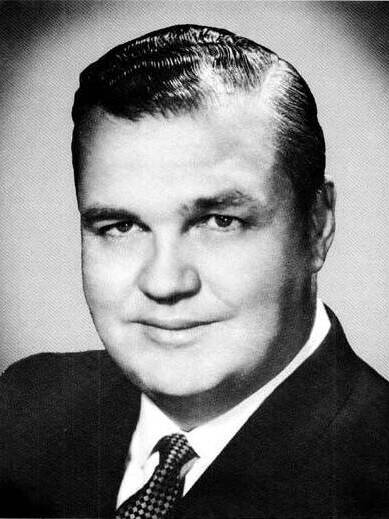
Nominee	Elbert S. Smith	Michael Howlett
Party	Republican	Democratic
Popular vote	2,217,229	1,992,707
Percentage	52.55%	47.23
- County results Smith: 50–60% 60–70% 70–80% Howlett: 50–60% 60–70%
Auditor of Public Accounts before election
Lloyd Morey
Republican
Elected Auditor of Public Accounts
Elbert S. Smith
Republican

Auditor of Public Accounts Orville Hodge, who had been elected in 1952, was seeking re-election and had won the Republican primary before being charged with 54 counts of bank fraud, embezzlement and forgery relating to a $6.15 million fraud he committed against the state; Hodge was removed from office, pleaded guilty and was sentenced to 12 to 15 years in prison.

Lloyd Morey was appointed in 1957 to replace Hodge, but decided not to seek reelection. Republican Elbert S. Smith was elected to succeed Morey.

==== Democratic primary ====
Auditor of Public Accounts Democratic primary
Party	Candidate	Votes	%
Democratic	Michael J. Howlett	644,184	
Total votes		644,184	100

==== Republican primary ====
Auditor of Public Accounts Republican primary
Party	Candidate	Votes	%
Republican	Orville Hodge (incumbent)	672,439	100
Democratic	Write-in	2	0.00
Total votes		672,441	100

==== General election ====
Auditor of Public Accounts election
Party	Candidate	Votes	%
Republican	Elbert S. Smith	2,217,229	52.55
Democratic	Michael J. Howlett	1,992,707	47.23
Socialist Labor	Stanley L. Prorok	9,468	0.22
Total votes		4,219,404	100

=== Treasurer ===
1956 Illinois State Treasurer election
- November 6, 1956
- Turnout: 80.80%
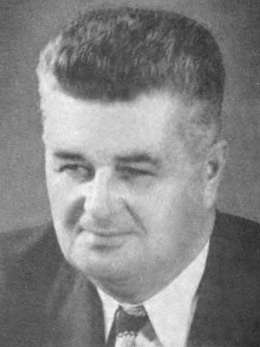

Nominee	Elmer J. Hoffman	Arthur L. Hellyer
Party	Republican	Democratic
Popular vote	2,226,340	1,981,234
Percentage	52.81%	47.00%
- County results Hoffman: 50–60% 60–70% 70–80% Hellyer: 50–60% 60–70%
Treasurer before election
Warren Wright
Republican
Elected Treasurer
Elmer J. Hoffman
Republican

Incumbent Treasurer Warren Wright, a Republican, did not seek reelection to a second-consecutive (third overall) term, instead opting to run (ultimately unsuccessfully) for the Republican nomination for governor. Republican Elmer J. Hoffman was elected to succeed him in office, earning Hoffman a second non-consecutive term as Treasurer.

This was the first Illinois Treasurer election to a four-year term, as voters approved a constitutional amendment in 1954 which extended term length from two to four-years beginning in 1956.

==== Democratic primary ====
Arthur L. Hellyer, who served as DuPage County Treasurer from 1934 until 1938 was unopposed for the Democratic nomination.

Treasurer Democratic primary
Party	Candidate	Votes	%
Democratic	Arthur L. Hellyer	635,633	100
Write-in	Others	1	0.00
Total votes		635,634	100

==== Republican primary ====
Treasurer Republican primary
Party	Candidate	Votes	%
Republican	Elmer J. Hoffman	666,961	100
Write-in	Others	8	0.00
Total votes		666,969	100

==== General election ====
Treasurer election
Party	Candidate	Votes	%
Republican	Elmer J. Hoffman	2,226,340	52.81
Democratic	Arthur L. Hellyer	1,981,234	47.00
Socialist Labor	Rudolph Kosle	8,244	0.20
Total votes		4,215,818	100

=== Clerk of the Supreme Court ===
1956 Illinois Clerk of the Supreme Court election
- November 6, 1956
- Turnout: 80.53%
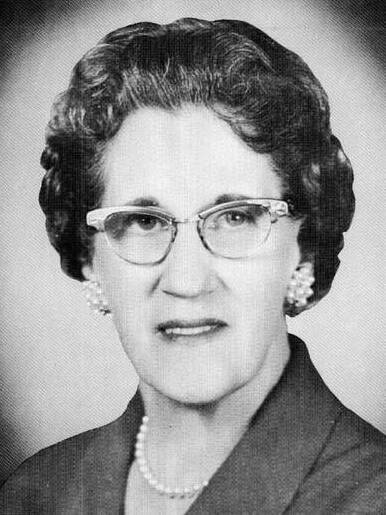

Nominee	Fae Searcy	James P. Alexander
Party	Republican	Democratic
Popular vote	2,285,311	1,909,378
Percentage	54.39%	45.44%
- County results Searcy: 50–60% 60–70% 70–80% Alexander: 50–60% 60–70%
Clerk before election
Fae Searcy
Republican
Elected Clerk
Fae Searcy
Republican

Incumbent Clerk of the Supreme Court Fae Searcy, a Republican appointed after the death in office of her husband Earle Benjamin Searcy, won reelection to a first full term.

Instead of being listed by her own name, Searcy opted to be listed on the ballot in both the primary and general election as "Ms. Earle Benjamin Searcy".

==== Democratic primary ====
Clerk of the Supreme Court Democratic primary
Party	Candidate	Votes	%
Democratic	James P. Alexander	631,400	100
Write-in	Others	6	0.00
Total votes		631,406	100

==== Republican primary ====
Clerk of the Supreme Court Republican primary
Party	Candidate	Votes	%
Republican	Fae Searcy (incumbent)	647,649	100
Write-in	Others	1	0.00
Total votes		647,650	100

==== General election ====
Clerk of the Supreme Court election
Party	Candidate	Votes	%
Republican	Fae Searcy (incumbent)	2,285,311	54.39
Democratic	James P. Alexander	1,909,378	45.44
Socialist Labor	Walter J. Leibfritz	7,279	0.17
Total votes		4,201,968	100

=== State Senate ===
Seats of the Illinois Senate were up for election in 1960. Republicans retained control of the chamber.

=== State House of Representatives ===
Seats in the Illinois House of Representatives were up for election in 1956. Republicans retained control of the chamber.

=== Trustees of University of Illinois ===
1956 Trustees of University of Illinois election
- November 6, 1956

An election using cumulative voting was held for three of the nine seats for Trustees of University of Illinois. All three Republican nominees won. The election was for 6-year terms.

Incumbent Republican Wayne A. Johnston won a second term. Incumbent Republican Timothy W. Swain, appointed in 1955 after the resignation of Red Grange, won election to his first full term. Also, joining them in winning election, was Republican Earl M. Hughes. Incumbent first-term Republican Herbert B. Megran had not been nominated for reelection.

Trustees of the University of Illinois election
Party	Candidate	Votes	%
Republican	Wayne A. Johnston (incumbent)	2,301,855	18.37
Republican	Timothy W. Swain (incumbent)	2,280,467	18.19
Republican	Earl M. Hughes	2,232,759	17.81
Democratic	Joseph Bruce Campbell	1,930,866	15.41
Democratic	Richard J. Nelson	1,889,835½	14.95
Democratic	Don Forsyth	1,873,181	14.95
Socialist Labor	Elizabeth W. White	8,996	0.07
Socialist Labor	Henry Schilling	8,216	0.07
Socialist Labor	Albert Bikar	7,910	0.06
Total votes		12,534,085½	100

=== Judicial elections ===
On April 10, special elections were held for vacancies on the Third and Sixteenth Judicial Circuit Districts. On November 2, special elections were held for three vacancies on the Superior Court of Cook County.

=== Ballot measures ===
Two ballot measures, were put before Illinois voters in 1956.

==== General Banking Law Amendment ====
Voters approved the General Banking Law Amendment a legislatively referred state statute which modified the state's banking law.

General Banking Law Amendment
Candidate	Votes	%
Yes	1,472,236	76.84
No	443,650	23.16
Total votes	1,915,886	100
Turnout	{{{votes}}}	36.72%

Amendment results by county Yes: 80–90%; 70–80%; 60–70%; 50–60%; No: 50–60%

==== Revenue Amendment ====
The Revenue Amendment, a legislatively referred constitutional amendment which would have amended Article IX Sections 1, 2, 3, 9 and 10 and repeal Article IX Section 13 of the 1870 Constitution of Illinois to give more leeway to the legislature in creating tax policy, while specifically forbidding the authorization of a graduated income tax, failed to meet either threshold for adoption. In order for constitutional amendments to pass, they required either two-thirds support among those specifically voting on the measure or 50% support among all ballots cast in the elections.

Revenue Amendment
Option	Votes	% of votes on measure	% of all ballots cast
Yes	2,139,150	60.30	47.70
No	1,408,132	39.70	31.40
Total votes	3,547,282	100	79.09
Voter turnout	67.98%		

Amendment results by county No: 80–90%; 70–80%; 60–70%; 50–60%; Yes: 50–60%

== Local elections ==
Local elections were held.
