= Latham Castle =

American judge (1900-1986)

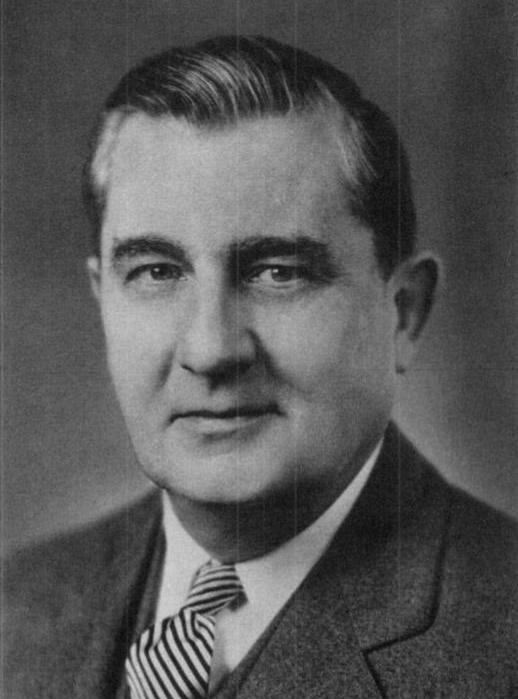
- Castle in 1953

Senior Judge of the United States Court of Appeals for the Seventh Circuit
- In office February 28, 1970 – March 10, 1986

Chief Judge of the United States Court of Appeals for the Seventh Circuit
- In office 1968–1970
- Preceded by: John Simpson Hastings
- Succeeded by: Luther Merritt Swygert

Judge of the United States Court of Appeals for the Seventh Circuit
- In office April 30, 1959 – February 28, 1970
- Appointed by: Dwight D. Eisenhower
- Preceded by: Philip J. Finnegan
- Succeeded by: Robert Arthur Sprecher

Attorney General of Illinois
- In office January 12, 1953 – May 8, 1959
- Governor: Adlai Stevenson II; William Stratton
- Preceded by: Ivan A. Elliott
- Succeeded by: Grenville Beardsley

Personal details
- Born: Latham Castle; February 27, 1900 Sandwich, Illinois
- Died: March 10, 1986 (aged 86)
- Party: Republican
- Education: Northwestern University (LLB)

Latham Castle (February 27, 1900 – March 10, 1986) was a United States circuit judge of the United States Court of Appeals for the Seventh Circuit.

== Education and career ==
Born in Sandwich, Illinois, Castle was in the United States Army towards the end of World War I, in 1918, and then received a Bachelor of Laws from Northwestern University Pritzker School of Law in 1924. He was in private practice in Sandwich from 1924 to 1925, and was a city attorney of Sandwich from 1925 to 1928, becoming a corporation counsel of Sycamore, Illinois in 1928. He was then a state's attorney of DeKalb County, Illinois from 1928 to 1940, becoming an assistant state attorney general of Illinois from 1940 to 1942. He was a County judge for DeKalb County from 1942 to 1952. He served as Attorney General from January 12, 1953, until May 8, 1959. He was succeeded as Attorney General by Grenville Beardsley.

== Federal judicial service ==
On February 26, 1959, Castle was nominated by President Dwight D. Eisenhower to a seat on the United States Court of Appeals for the Seventh Circuit vacated by Judge Philip J. Finnegan. Castle was confirmed by the United States Senate on April 29, 1959, and received his commission on April 30, 1959. He served as Chief Judge from 1968 to 1970, assuming senior status on February 26, 1970, and serving in that capacity until his death on March 10, 1986.

== Personal life ==
In May 1931, Latham married Georgiana Whitcomb, daughter of Mr. and Mrs. William Card Whitcomb who was the President of the Geo D. Whitcomb Company of Rochelle, Illinois.

== Sources ==
Party political offices
Preceded by George F. Barrett	Republican nominee for Attorney General of Illinois; 1952, 1956	Succeeded by William L. Guild
Legal offices
Preceded by Ivan A. Elliott	Attorney General of Illinois; 1952–1959	Succeeded by Grenville Beardsley
Preceded by Philip J. Finnegan	Judge of the United States Court of Appeals for the Seventh Circuit; 1959–1970	Succeeded by Robert Arthur Sprecher
Preceded by John Simpson Hastings	Chief Judge of the United States Court of Appeals for the Seventh Circuit; 1968–1970	Succeeded by Luther Merritt Swygert
