= William L. Guild =

American judge

William L. Guild, Jr. (February 22, 1910 – May 13, 1993) was an American lawyer and jurist.

Born in Wayne Township, DuPage County, Illinois, he received his bachelor's degree from Wheaton College in 1931 and his law degree from Northwestern University School of Law in 1934. Guild then practiced law in Wheaton, Illinois. During World War II, Guild served in the United States Army. In 1953, Guild served as State's Attorney for DuPage County, Illinois and then in 1958, he was elected DuPage County judge. In 1960, Guild was appointed Illinois Attorney General to fill a vacancy and served until his defeat leaving office in 1961. Guild was a Republican. In 1964, Guild was elected associate judge and then was appointed to the Illinois Appellate Court serving until his retirement in 1979. Guild died in Wheaton, Illinois.

== Notes ==
Party political offices
Preceded by Latham Castle	Republican nominee for Attorney General of Illinois; 1960	Succeeded by Elroy C. Sandquist
Legal offices
Preceded by Grenville Beardsley	Attorney General of Illinois; 1960–1961	Succeeded by William G. Clark
