= Samuel Shapiro (Illinois politician) =

Governor of Illinois from 1968 to 1969

Sam Shapiro
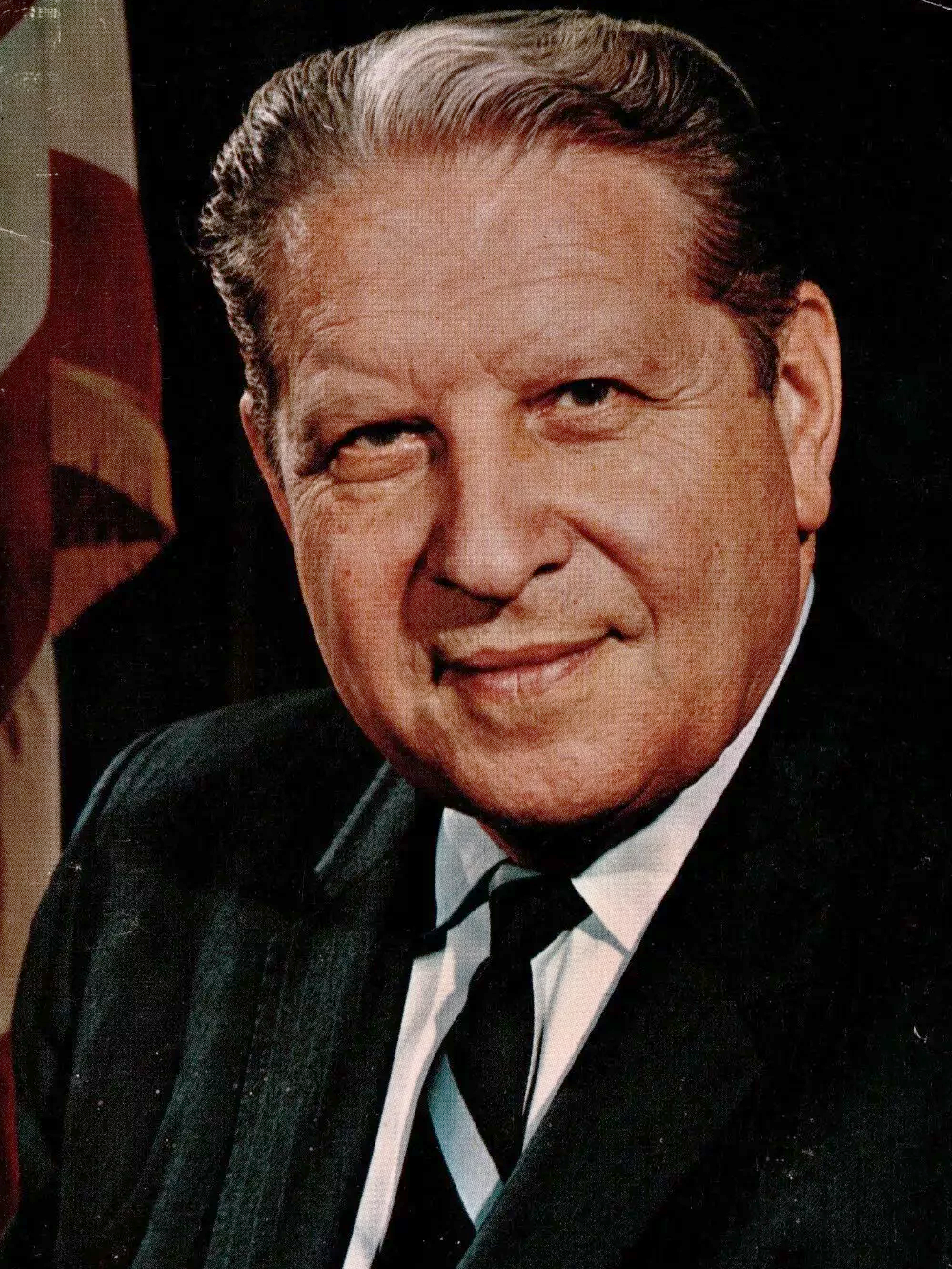
- Official portrait, c. 1968

34th Governor of Illinois
- In office May 21, 1968 – January 13, 1969
- Lieutenant: Vacant
- Preceded by: Otto Kerner Jr.
- Succeeded by: Richard B. Ogilvie

38th Lieutenant Governor of Illinois
- In office January 9, 1961 – May 21, 1968
- Governor: Otto Kerner Jr.
- Preceded by: John William Chapman
- Succeeded by: Paul Simon (1969)

1st Chair of the National Lieutenant Governors Association
- In office 1962–1963
- Preceded by: position established
- Succeeded by: Harold H. Chase

Personal details
- Born: Israel Shapiro; April 25, 1907 Governorate of Estonia, Russian Empire
- Died: March 16, 1987 (aged 79) Kankakee, Illinois, U.S.
- Party: Democratic
- Education: University of Illinois, Urbana-Champaign (LLB)
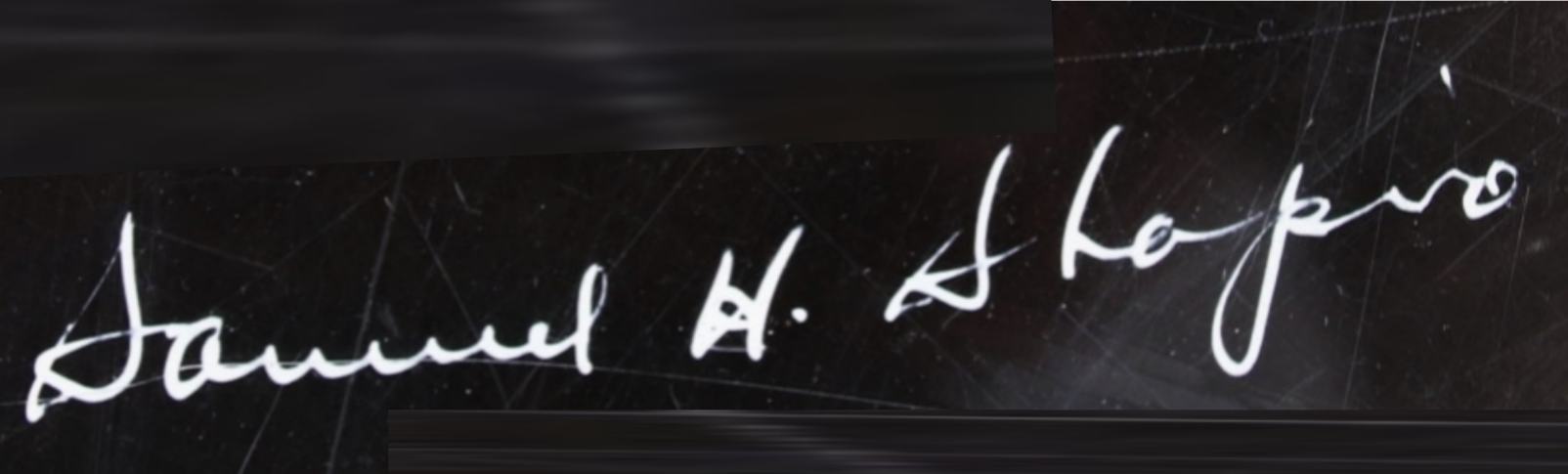
- Signature

Samuel Harvey Shapiro (born Israel Shapiro; April 25, 1907 – March 16, 1987) was an American politician, the 34th governor of Illinois, serving from 1968 to 1969. He was a member of the Democratic Party.

== Life and career ==
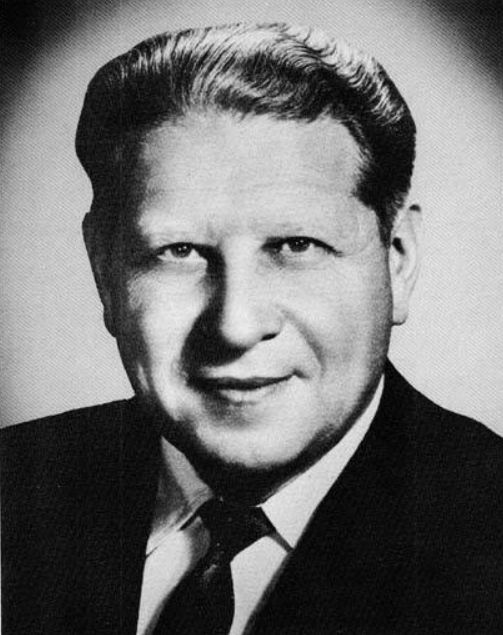
Shapiro as lieutenant governor

Born in 1907 in the Governorate of Estonia of the Russian Empire, he emigrated to the United States at an early age. He graduated from the University of Illinois College of Law in 1929. As a lawyer, Shapiro practiced in Kankakee, Illinois. Turning to public service, he was elected state's attorney (county prosecutor) of Kankakee County in 1936. From 1947–1961 he served in the Illinois State House of Representatives, where he took a special interest in mental health issues.

Shapiro was elected the 38th Lieutenant Governor of Illinois in 1960 and again in 1964, and took office as governor when the previous governor Otto Kerner, Jr. resigned to accept appointment to the federal appellate court. Shapiro thus became the second Jewish governor of Illinois (Henry Horner being the first). Illinois thereby became the first state to have had two Jewish governors; New York, Oregon, Pennsylvania and Rhode Island have each since elected at least a second governor of the faith.

Upon becoming governor, Shapiro ran at once for a full term of his own but was narrowly defeated by Republican Richard B. Ogilvie in the 1968 election. He then returned to private life, although he was called upon several times to serve on special commissions, the most significant of which was a commission to redraw state electoral boundaries in 1981.

Shapiro was an alumnus of the Alpha Epsilon Pi fraternity. From 1984 until his death, he led the effort to establish a permanent headquarters for the fraternity's national offices. As a result, Alpha Epsilon Pi's International Headquarters is dedicated in his honor.

Shapiro continued to work as an attorney; his death was discovered when he failed to appear in court for a client and police were sent to his home in Kankakee to investigate. He is buried in Jewish Waldheim Cemetery in Forest Park, Illinois. The state renamed the Kankakee Mental Health Center in his honor.

== See also ==
- List of United States governors born outside the United States

Party political offices
Preceded by Roscoe Bonjean	Democratic nominee for Lieutenant Governor of Illinois; 1960, 1964	Succeeded by Paul Simon
Preceded by Otto Kerner Jr.	Democratic nominee for Governor of Illinois; 1968	Succeeded by Dan Walker
Political offices
Preceded by John William Chapman	Lieutenant Governor of Illinois; 1961–1968	Succeeded by Paul Simon
Preceded by Otto Kerner Jr.	Governor of Illinois; 1968–1969	Succeeded by Richard B. Ogilvie
