= 1952 Illinois elections =

- November 4, 1952
- Turnout: 86.04%

Elections were held in Illinois on Tuesday, November 4, 1952.

Primaries were held on April 8.

The elections, in large part, saw a strong performance by the Republican Party.

The Republican Party retained control both chambers of the Illinois General Assembly and also won the Governorship, winning them a trifecta of state government control. They also swept all statewide elected executive offices. Additionally, they won all three seats for University of Illinois Trustees that were up for election.

For the first time since 1928, Illinois voted for the Republican presidential ticket, despite the fact that the Democratic ticket was headed by incumbent Illinois Governor Adlai Stevenson II.

== Election information ==
=== Turnout ===
In the primary, 2,289,347 ballots were cast (891,991 Democratic and 1,397,356 Republican).

In the general election, turnout was 86.04% with a total of 4,563,305 ballots cast.

== Federal elections ==
=== United States President ===
Illinois voted for the Republican ticket of Dwight D. Eisenhower and Richard Nixon. They defeated the Democratic ticket of (incumbent Illinois Governor) Adlai Stevenson II and John Sparkman.

This was the first time since 1928 that Illinois had voted for the Republican presidential ticket. This came despite the fact that the Democratic ticket was headed by Stevenson.

=== United States House ===
Illinois had redistricted before this election, and had lost one seat due to reapportionment following the 1950 United States census. All of Illinois' remaining 25 seats in the United States House of Representatives were up for election in 1952.

Before the election Republicans held 18 seats and Democrats held 8 seats from Illinois. In 1952, Republicans won 16 seats and Democrats won 9 seats.

== State elections ==
=== Governor ===
1952 Illinois gubernatorial election
- November 4, 1952
- Turnout: 83.26%
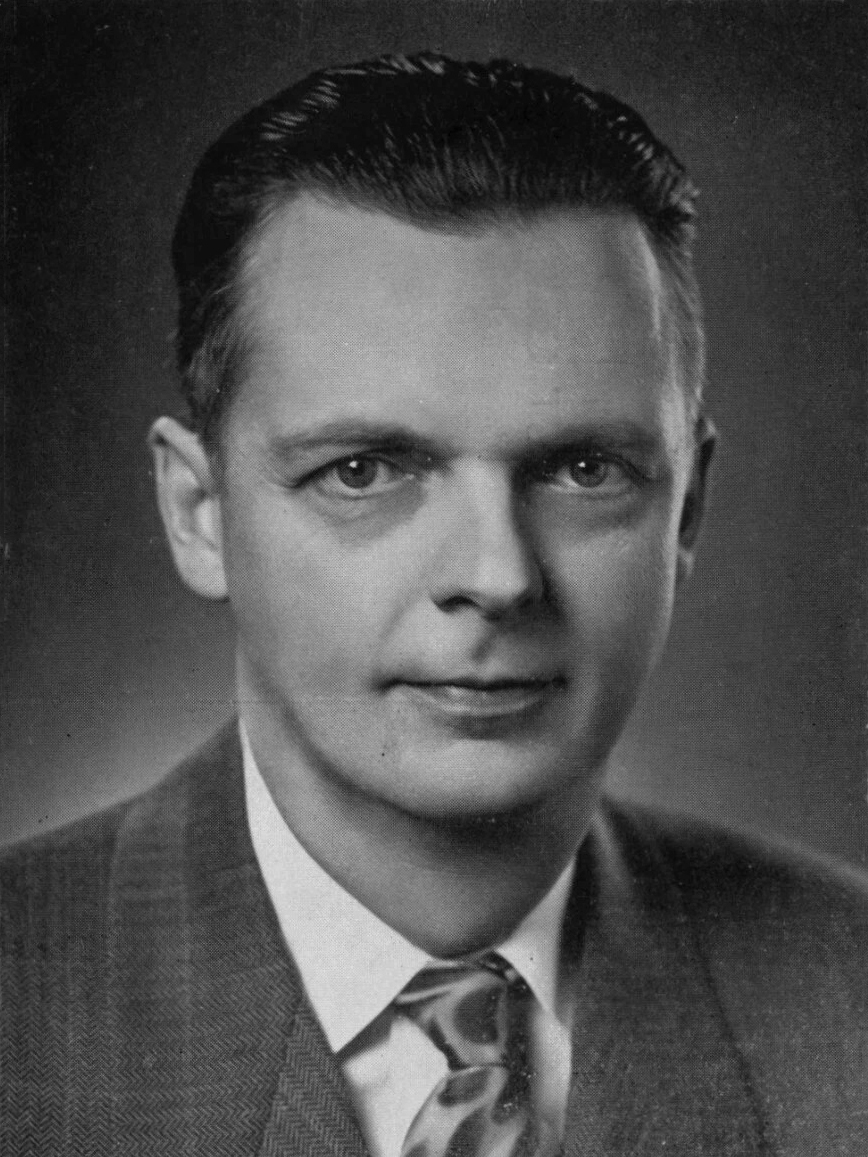

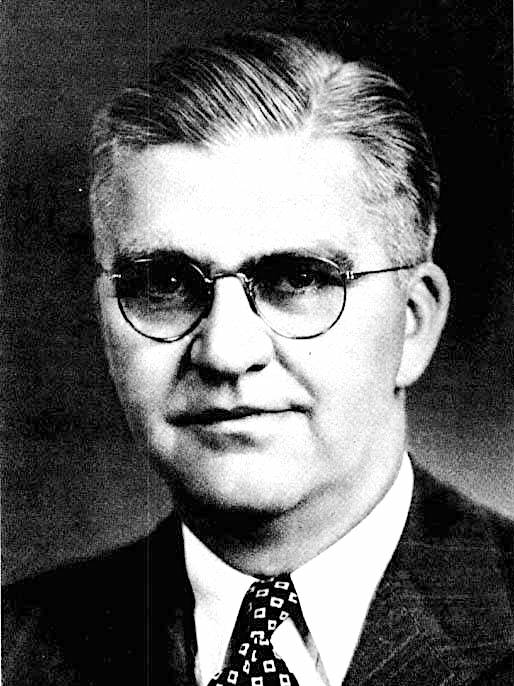
| Nominee | William Stratton | Sherwood Dixon |
| Party | Republican | Democratic |
| Popular vote | 2,317,363 | 2,089,721 |
| Percentage | 52.48% | 47.32% |
- County Results Stratton: 50–60% 60–70% 70–80% Dixon: 50–60% 60–70%
Governor before election
Adlai Stevenson II
Democratic
Elected Governor
William Stratton
Republican

Incumbent Governor Adlai Stevenson II, a Democrat, ultimately did not seek a second term, instead opting to run as his party's nominee for President of the United States. Republican William Stratton was elected to succeed him in office.

==== General election ====
Gubernatorial election
| Party | Candidate | Votes | % |
|---|---|---|---|
| Republican | William G. Stratton | 2,317,363 | 52.48 |
| Democratic | Sherwood Dixon | 2,089,721 | 47.32 |
| Socialist Labor | Louis Fisher | 8,777 | 0.20 |
| Write-in | Others | 3 | 0.00 |
| Total votes | | 4,415,864 | 100 |

=== Lieutenant governor ===
1952 Illinois lieutenant gubernatorial election
- November 4, 1952
- Turnout: 81.88%
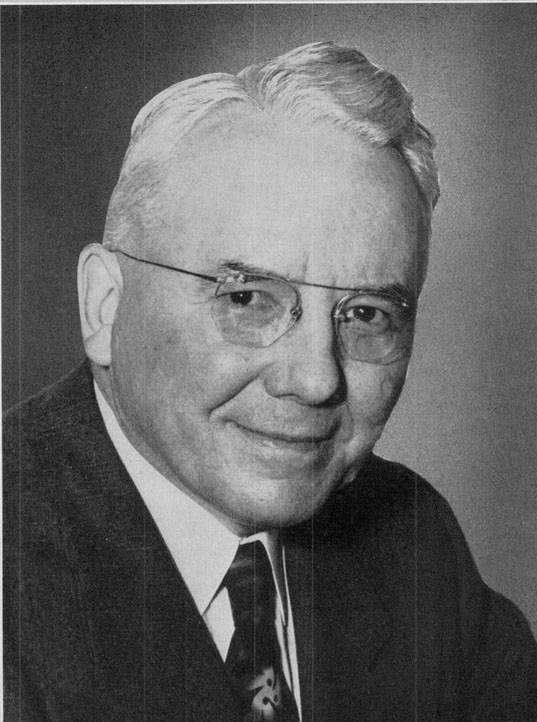

| Nominee | John William Chapman | Herbert C. Paschen |
| Party | Republican | Democratic |
| Popular vote | 2,291,812 | 2,043,021 |
| Percentage | 52.77% | 47.05% |
- County results Chapman: 50–60% 60–70% 70–80% Paschen: 50–60% 60–70%
Lieutenant Governor before election
Sherwood Dixon
Democratic
Elected Lieutenant Governor
John William Chapman
Republican

Incumbent lieutenant governor Sherwood Dixon, a Democrat, ultimately did not seek reelection to a second term, instead opting to run for governor. Republican John William Chapman was elected to succeed him in office.

Before being made the Democratic nominee for governor (replacing Adlai Stevenson II, who opted to instead read for president for the United States), Dixon had been running for reelection, even winning the Democratic nomination. Attorney Herbert C. Paschen replaced Dixon as the Democratic nominee for lieutenant governor.

==== Democratic primary ====
Lieutenant gubernatorial Democratic primary
| Party | Candidate | Votes | % |
|---|---|---|---|
| Democratic | Sherwood Dixon (incumbent) | 629,332 | 100 |
| Write-in | Others | 5 | 0.00 |
| Total votes | | 578,390 | 100 |

==== Republican primary ====
Lieutenant gubernatorial Republican primary
| Party | Candidate | Votes | % |
|---|---|---|---|
| Republican | John William Chapman | 480,908 | 43.12 |
| Republican | John D. Biggs | 479,009 | 42.95 |
| Republican | Patrick S. Clary | 155,332 | 13.93 |
| Write-in | Others | 4 | 0.00 |
| Total votes | | 1,115,253 | 100 |

==== General election ====
Lieutenant gubernatorial election
| Party | Candidate | Votes | % |
|---|---|---|---|
| Republican | John William Chapman | 2,291,812 | 52.77 |
| Democratic | Herbert C. Paschen | 2,043,021 | 47.05 |
| Socialist Labor | Frank Schnur | 7,836 | 0.18 |
| Total votes | | 4,342,669 | 100 |

=== Attorney general ===
1952 Illinois Attorney General election
- November 4, 1952
- Turnout: 81.71%
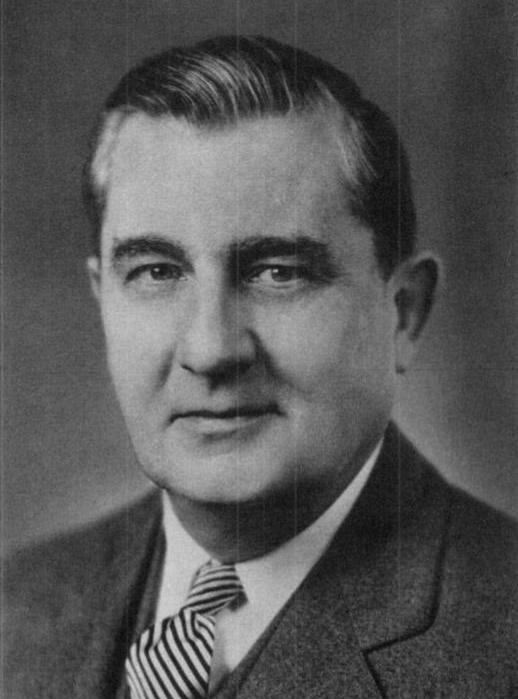

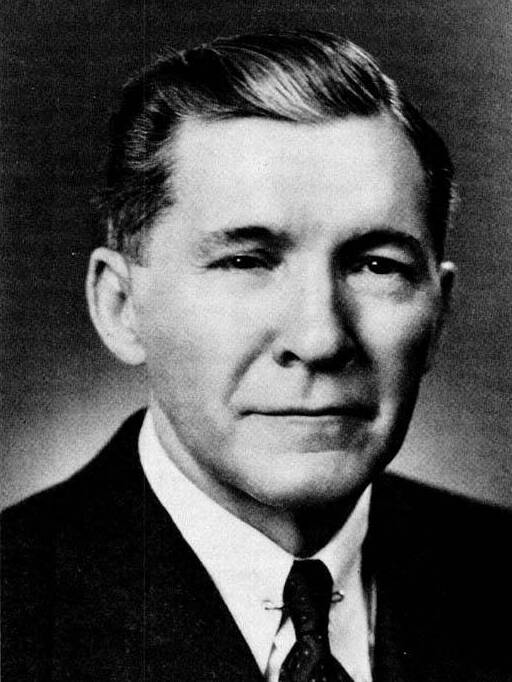
| Nominee | Latham Castle | Ivan A. Elliott |
| Party | Republican | Democratic |
| Popular vote | 2,269,082 | 2,056,411 |
| Percentage | 52.36% | 47.46% |
- County results Castle: 50–60% 60–70% 70–80% Elliott: 50–60% 60–70%
Attorney General before election
Ivan A. Elliott
Democratic
Elected Attorney General
Latham Castle
Republican

Incumbent attorney general Ivan A. Elliott, a Democrat running for a second term, lost to Republican Latham Castle.

==== Democratic primary ====
Attorney General Democratic primary
| Party | Candidate | Votes | % |
|---|---|---|---|
| Democratic | Ivan A. Elliott (incumbent) | 370,351 | 52.99 |
| Democratic | Joseph P. Burke | 194,997 | 27.90 |
| Democratic | James L. Griffin | 133,586 | 19.11 |
| Total votes | | 698,934 | 100 |

==== Republican primary ====
Attorney General Republican primary
| Party | Candidate | Votes | % |
|---|---|---|---|
| Republican | Latham Castle | 330,692 | 29.35 |
| Republican | Lee E. Daniels | 252,999 | 22.46 |
| Republican | J. Roy Browning | 200,880 | 17.83 |
| Republican | Conrad Noll | 177,174 | 15.73 |
| Republican | Edward P. Saltiel | 164,955 | 14.64 |
| Write-in | Others | 2 | 0.00 |
| Total votes | | 1,126,702 | |

==== General election ====
Attorney General election
| Party | Candidate | Votes | % |
|---|---|---|---|
| Republican | Latham Castle | 2,269,082 | 52.36 |
| Democratic | Ivan A. Elliott (incumbent) | 2,056,411 | 47.46 |
| Socialist Labor | Bernard Campbell | 7,933 | 0.18 |
| Total votes | | 4,333,426 | 100 |

=== Secretary of State ===
1952 Illinois Secretary of State election
- November 4, 1952
- Turnout: 82.80%
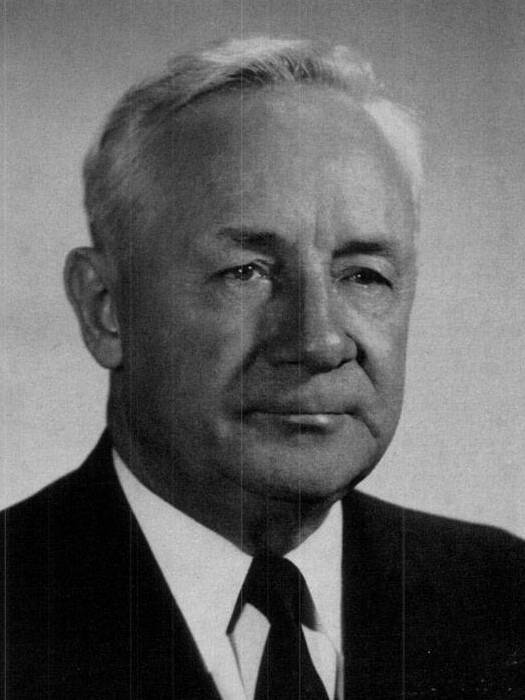

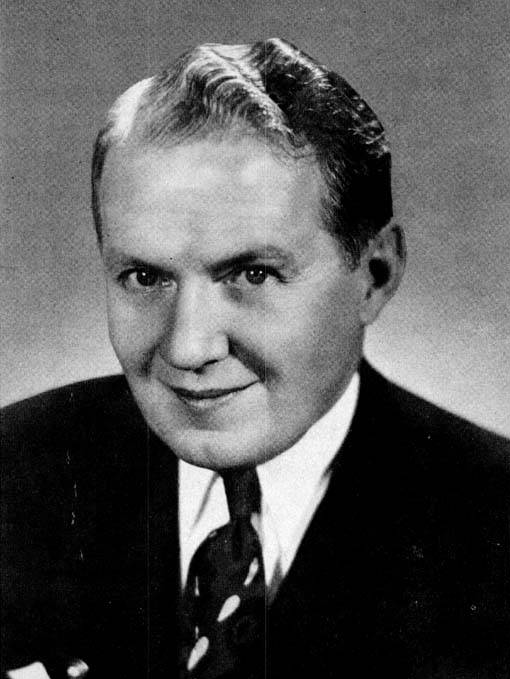
| Nominee | Charles F. Carpentier | Edward J. Barrett |
| Party | Republican | Democratic |
| Popular vote | 2,196,327 | 2,187,024 |
| Percentage | 50.02% | 49.81% |
- County results Carpentier: 40–50% 50–60% 60–70% 70–80% Barrett: 50–60% 60–70%
Secretary of State before election
Edward J. Barrett
Democratic
Elected Secretary of State
Charles F. Carpentier
Republican

The Secretary of State Edward J. Barrett, a Democrat seeking a third term, was defeated by Republican Charles F. Carpentier.

==== Democratic primary ====
Secretary of State Democratic primary
| Party | Candidate | Votes | % |
|---|---|---|---|
| Democratic | Edward J. Barrett (incumbent) | 709,646 | 100 |
| Write-in | Others | 4 | 0.00 |
| Total votes | | 709,650 | 100 |

==== Republican primary ====
Secretary of State primary
| Party | Candidate | Votes | % |
|---|---|---|---|
| Republican | Charles F. Carpentier | 455,994 | 39.97 |
| Republican | Warren E. Wright | 449,549 | 39.41 |
| Republican | Harold R. Collier | 125,044 | 10.96 |
| Republican | George R. Hedges | 110,224 | 9.66 |
| Write-in | Others | 4 | 0.00 |
| Total votes | | 1,140,815 | |

==== General election ====
Secretary of State election
| Party | Candidate | Votes | % |
|---|---|---|---|
| Republican | Charles F. Carpentier | 2,196,327 | 50.02 |
| Democratic | Edward J. Barrett (incumbent) | 2,187,024 | 49.81 |
| Socialist Labor | Edward C. Gross | 7,861 | 0.18 |
| Total votes | | 4,391,212 | 100 |

=== Auditor of Public Accounts ===
1952 Illinois Auditor of Public Accounts election
- November 4, 1952
- Turnout: 81.94%
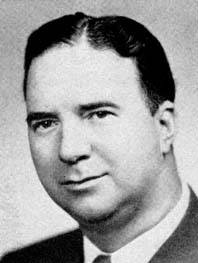

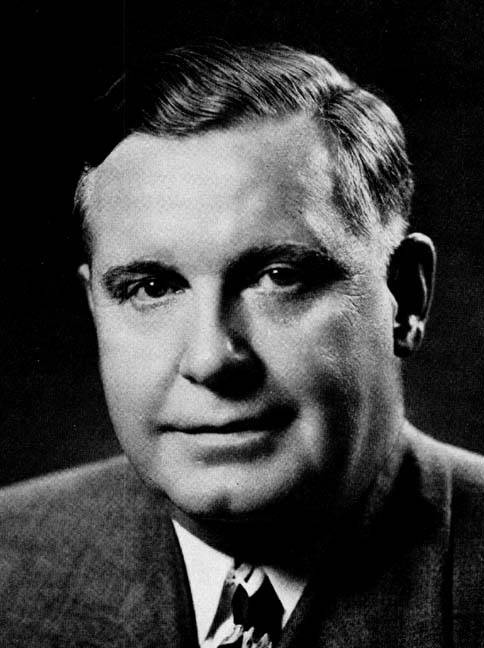
| Nominee | Orville Hodge | Benjamin O. Cooper |
| Party | Republican | Democratic |
| Popular vote | 2,336,424 | 2,001,023 |
| Percentage | 53.77% | 46.05% |
- County results Hodge: 50–60% 60–70% 70–80% Cooper: 50–60% 60–70%
Auditor of Public Accounts before election
Benjamin O. Cooper
Democratic
Elected Auditor of Public Accounts
Orville Hodge
Republican

Incumbent Auditor of Public Accounts Benjamin O. Cooper, a Democrat seeking a second term, was defeated by Republican Orville Hodge.

==== Democratic primary ====
Auditor of Public Accounts Democratic primary
| Party | Candidate | Votes | % |
|---|---|---|---|
| Democratic | Benjamin O. Cooper (incumbent) | 634,083 | 100 |
| Write-in | Others | 2 | 0.00 |
| Total votes | | 634,085 | 100 |

==== Republican primary ====
Auditor of Public Accounts Republican primary
| Party | Candidate | Votes | % |
|---|---|---|---|
| Republican | Orville E. Hodge | 287,627 | 24.77 |
| Republican | James E. Hill | 226,134 | 19.47 |
| Republican | Ralph Waldo Emerson | 186,960 | 16.10 |
| Republican | Louis E. Nelson | 174,987 | 15.07 |
| Republican | Richard J. Oglesby | 113,091 | 9.74 |
| Republican | Arthur E. Larson | 105,253 | 9.06 |
| Republican | William H. Brown | 67,187 | 5.79 |
| Write-in | Others | 2 | 0.00 |
| Total votes | | 1,161,243 | |

==== General election ====
Auditor of Public Accounts election
| Party | Candidate | Votes | % |
|---|---|---|---|
| Republican | Orville E. Hodge | 2,336,424 | 53.77 |
| Democratic | Benjamin O. Cooper (incumbent) | 2,001,023 | 46.05 |
| Socialist Labor | Nick Mays | 8,065 | 0.19 |
| Total votes | | 4,345,512 | 100 |

=== Treasurer ===
1952 Illinois State Treasurer election
- November 4, 1952
- Turnout: 82.40%
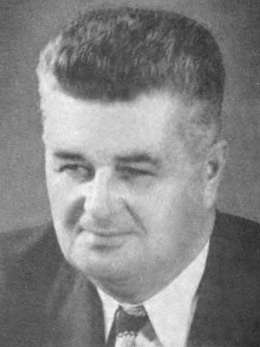

| Nominee | Elmer J. Hoffman | Fred A. Cain |
| Party | Republican | Democratic |
| Popular vote | 2,366,170 | 1,996,132 |
| Percentage | 54.15% | 45.68% |
- County results Hoffman: 50–60% 60–70% 70–80% Cain: 50–60% 60–70%
Treasurer before election
William Stratton
Republican
Elected Treasurer
Elmer J. Hoffman
Republican

Incumbent Treasurer William Stratton, a Republican, did not seek reelection to a second-consecutive (third overall) term, instead opting to run for governor. Republican Elmer J. Hoffman was elected to succeed him in office.

==== Democratic primary ====
Treasurer Democratic primary
| Party | Candidate | Votes | % |
|---|---|---|---|
| Democratic | Fred A. Cain | 628,356 | 100 |
| Write-in | Others | 6 | 0.00 |
| Total votes | | 628,362 | 100 |

==== Republican primary ====
Treasurer Republican primary
| Party | Candidate | Votes | % |
|---|---|---|---|
| Republican | Elmer J. Hoffman | 471,668 | 62.86 |
| Republican | Leslie J. Smith | 154,496 | 20.59 |
| Republican | William E. Wayland | 124,244 | 16.56 |
| Total votes | | 750,408 | |

==== General election ====
Treasurer election
| Party | Candidate | Votes | % |
|---|---|---|---|
| Republican | Elmer J. Hoffman | 2,366,170 | 54.15 |
| Democratic | Fred A. Cain | 1,996,132 | 45.68 |
| Socialist Labor | Gregory P. Lyngas | 7,755 | 0.18 |
| Total votes | | 4,370,057 | 100 |

=== State Senate ===
Seats of the Illinois Senate were up for election in 1952. Republicans retained control of the chamber.

=== State House of Representatives ===
Seats in the Illinois House of Representatives were up for election in 1952. Republicans retained control of the chamber.

=== Trustees of University of Illinois ===
1952 Trustees of University of Illinois election
- November 4, 1952

An election was held for three of the nine seats for Trustees of University of Illinois. All three Republican nominees won.

Republican incumbent Park Livingston was reelected to a third term. Republican incumbent Doris Holt was reelected to a second term. Joining them in being elected was fellow Republican Cushman Bissell.

Trustees of the University of Illinois election
| Party | Candidate | Votes | % |
|---|---|---|---|
| Republican | Park Livington (incumbent) | 2,392,531½ | 18.53 |
| Republican | Cushman B. Bissell | 2,312,089 | 17.91 |
| Republican | Doris S. Holt (incumbent) | 2,283,764 | 17.69 |
| Democratic | Harold Pogue | 2,006,419½ | 15.54 |
| Democratic | Charles E. Bliss | 1,963,787 | 15.21 |
| Democratic | Julien H. Collins | 1,929,105 | 14.94 |
| Socialist Labor | Helen L. Olsen | 9,074 | 0.07 |
| Socialist Labor | Henry Schilling | 8,431 | 0.07 |
| Socialist Labor | Oscar Haeggquist | 8,172 | 0.06 |
| Total votes | | 12,913,373 | 100 |

=== Ballot measures ===
Five statewide ballot measures were put before the residents of Illinois in 1952.

In order for constitutional amendments (of which all but one ballot measure was) to pass, they required either two-thirds support among those specifically voting on the measure or 50% support among all ballots cast in the elections.

==== County Officers' Compensation Amendment ====
Voters approved the County Officers' Compensation Amendment, a legislatively referred constitutional amendment which amended Article X Section 10 of the 1870 Constitution of Illinois to establish rules for the compensation of county officer which stated that the compensation amount would be set by the county board and could not increase or diminish during the term of office.

County Officers' Compensation Amendment
| Option | Votes | % of votes on measure | % of all ballots cast |
|---|---|---|---|
| Yes | 2,024,823 | 67.40 | 44.37 |
| No | 979,401 | 32.60 | 21.46 |
| Total votes | 3,005,155 | 100 | 65.86 |
| Voter turnout | 56.66% | | |

Amendment results by county Yes: 70–80%; 60–70%; 50–60%; No: 60–70%; 50–60%

==== Double Liability Banking Amendment ====
Voters approved the Double Liability Banking Amendment, a legislatively referred constitutional amendment which amended Article XI Section 6 of the 1870 Constitution of Illinois to make it so that individual stockholders of banking institutions should not be personally liable to the creditors of the corporation.

Double Liability Banking Amendment
| Option | Votes | % of votes on measure | % of all ballots cast |
|---|---|---|---|
| Yes | 2,072,965 | 68.69 | 45.43 |
| No | 944,845 | 31.31 | 20.70 |
| Total votes | 3,017,810 | 100 | 66.13 |
| Voter turnout | 56.90% | | |

Amendment results by county Yes: 70–80%; 60–70%; 50–60%; No: 60–70%; 50–60%

==== General Banking Law Amendment ====
Voters approved the General Banking Law Amendment, a legislatively referred state statute which made changes to section 13 of the general banking law.

General Banking Law Amendment
| Candidate | Votes | % |
|---|---|---|
| Yes | 2,173,425 | 82.66 |
| No | 455,782 | 17.34 |
| Total votes | 2,629,207 | 100 |
| Turnout | {{{votes}}} | 49.58% |

Amendment results by county Yes: 80–90%; 70–80%; 60–70%; 50–60%; No: 50–60%

==== Re-election of County Officers Amendment ====
The Re-election of County Officers Amendment, a legislatively referred constitutional amendment which would amend Article X Section 8 of the 1870 Constitution of Illinois create new rules for the election of officers in each county, failed to pass either threshold for adoption.

Re-election of County Officers Amendment
| Option | Votes | % of votes on measure | % of all ballots cast |
|---|---|---|---|
| Yes | 1,953,675 | 64.30 | 42.81 |
| No | 1,084,864 | 35.70 | 23.77 |
| Total votes | 3,038,539 | 100 | 66.59 |
| Voter turnout | 57.29% | | |

Amendment results by county No: 60–70%; 50–60%; Yes: 70–80%; 60–70%; 50–60%

==== Revenue Amendment ====
The Revenue Amendment, a legislatively referred constitutional amendment which would amend Article IX Sections 1, 2 3, 9, and 10 and repeal Section IX Section 13 to modify the power of the legislature to levy taxes, failed to reach either threshold required for adoption.

Revenue Amendment
| Option | Votes | % of votes on measure | % of all ballots cast |
|---|---|---|---|
| Yes | 1,838,596 | 61.37 | 40.29 |
| No | 1,157,406 | 38.63 | 25.36 |
| Total votes | 2,996,002 | 100 | 65.65 |
| Voter turnout | 56.49% | | |

Amendment results by county No: 70–80%; 60–70%; 50–60%; Yes: 70–80%; 60–70%; 50–60%

== Local elections ==
Local elections were held.
