= Grenville Beardsley =

American politician (1898–1960)

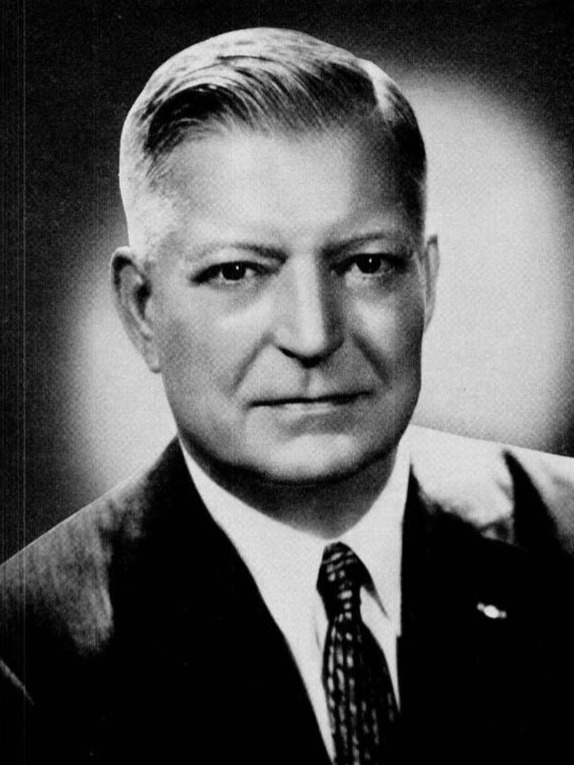
- Headshot c. 1959-1960

Attorney General of Illinois
- In office May 9, 1959 – June 3, 1960
- Preceded by: Latham Castle
- Succeeded by: William L. Guild

Personal details
- Born: January 12, 1898 Salem, Iowa, US
- Died: June 3, 1960 (aged 62)
- Party: Republican
- Spouse: Leona Murray Beardsley
- Children: 1
- Education: Knox College; John Marshall Law School (J.D.)
- Occupation: Attorney

Grenville Beardsley II (January 12, 1898 – June 3, 1960) was Attorney General of Illinois from 1959 to 1960.

== Early life and education ==
Beardsley was born in Salem, Iowa, the son of Frank Grenville Beardsley, Ph.D, a Congregationalist minister, evangelist, and author. He attended Knox College and Illinois Wesleyan University. He graduated from Knox College in 1917. After World War I, he completed his legal education at the John Marshall Law School.

== Career ==
After the war, he graduated with a Juris Doctor degree from John Marshall Law School in Chicago. He became active in Illinois Republican politics, and between World War I and World War II he ran for several offices, including the State Senate and Illinois Attorney General.

After the war, he returned home to his family in Chicago to practice law. He remained in the Army Reserve, was commandant of JAG officer's school at Northwestern University, and was promoted to full colonel. Beardsley remained active in politics and ran for several offices, including State's Attorney. The Chicago Tribune named him the winner, making him the first Republican to win a countywide office in several decades. The election was overturned in a disputed recount. He gained notoriety representing the State of Illinois versus the Illinois Central Railroad. As a result of the case the state was awarded several million dollars of back taxes.

He joined the attorney general's office of Illinois as first assistant attorney general. After Latham Castle was appointed a judge of the United States Court of Appeals for the Seventh Circuit, Beardsley was appointed Attorney General of Illinois. He took office effective May 9th, 1959.

== Military service ==
While in law school, Beardsley's studies were disrupted by service in World War I. He enlisted as a private in World War I and became an officer by the end of the war. On May 15, 1942, Mr. Beardsley was called to active duty as Captain in the United States Army. He served with General Joseph Stilwell for two years at his headquarters in New Delhi, India. During his service, he was awarded the Legion of Merit. By the end of the war, he reached the rank of Lieutenant Colonel. At the time of his death, he was a Colonel in the United States Army Reserve.

== Personal life ==
In 1960 he had an aneurysm at his desk in the old State of Illinois Building on LaSalle Street, and died on June 3, a few days later. He was married to Leona Murray Beardsley and had a son, Frank Grenville Beardsley (III). He was a descendant of William Beardsley of Stratford, Connecticut. After his death, Governor William G. Stratton appointed William L. Guild, then a DuPage County Judge, effective June 17, 1960, to the vacancy created by Beardsley's death.

== Notes ==
Legal offices
Preceded by Latham Castle	Attorney General of Illinois; 1959–1960	Succeeded by William L. Guild
