= 1938 Illinois elections =

- November 8, 1938

Elections were held in Illinois on Tuesday, November 8, 1938.

Primaries were held April 12, 1938.

== Election information ==
1938 was a midterm election year in the United States.

=== Turnout ===
In the primary election 2,550,642 ballots were cast (1,744,005 Democratic and 806,637 Republican).

In the general election 3,274,814 ballots were cast.

== Federal elections ==
=== United States Senate ===
Incumbent Democrat William H. Dieterich retired. Democrat Scott W. Lucas was elected to succeed him.

=== United States House ===
All 27 Illinois seats in the United States House of Representatives were up for election in 1938.

Republicans flipped four Democratic-held seats, making the composition of Illinois' House delegation 17 Democrats and 10 Republicans.

== State elections ==
=== Treasurer ===
1938 Illinois State Treasurer election
- November 8, 1938
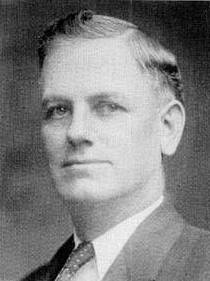

Nominee	Louie E. Lewis	William R. McCauley
Party	Democratic	Republican
Popular vote	1,595,354	1,490,659
Percentage	51.53%	48.15%
Treasurer before election
John C. Martin
Democratic
Elected Treasurer
Louie E. Lewis
Democratic

Incumbent Treasurer John C. Martin, a Democrat serving his second nonconsecutive term, did not seek reelection, instead opting to run for United States congress. Democrat Louie E. Lewis was elected to succeed him.

==== Democratic primary ====
Treasurer Democratic primary
Party	Candidate	Votes	%
Democratic	Louie E. Lewis	749,665	51.26
Democratic	Bruce A. Campbell	625,044	42.74
Democratic	G. N. (Pat.) Keefe	87,860	6.01
Total votes		1,462,569	100

==== Republican primary ====
Incumbent congressman William G. Stratton won the Republican nomination.

Treasurer Republican primary
Party	Candidate	Votes	%
Republican	William R. McCauley	360,585	55.36
Republican	Warren Wright	290,780	44.64
Total votes		651,365	100

==== General election ====
Treasurer election
Party	Candidate	Votes	%
Democratic	Louie E. Lewis	1,595,354	51.53
Democratic	William R. McCauley	1,490,659	48.15
Prohibition	Clay F. Gaumer	9,731	0.31
Write-in	Others	4	0.00
Total votes		3,095,744	100

=== Superintendent of Public Instruction ===
1938 Illinois Superintendent of Public Instruction election
- November 8, 1938
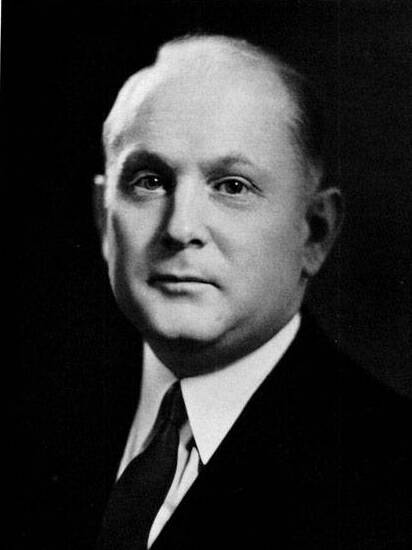

Nominee	John A. Wieland	Wiley B. Garvin
Party	Democratic	Republican
Popular vote	1,559,286½	1,466,167
Percentage	51.35%	48.29%
Superintendent before election
John A. Wieland
Democratic
Elected Superintendent
John A. Wieland
Democratic

Incumbent first-term Superintendent of Public Instruction John A. Wieland, a Democrat, won reelection.

==== Democratic primary ====
Superintendent of Public Instruction Democratic primary
Party	Candidate	Votes	%
Democratic	John A. Wieland (incumbent)	601,743	43.22
Democratic	Frank A. Jensen	571,735	41.06
Democratic	Thomas M. Enright	123,318	8.86
Democratic	Elmer Henry Vogel	95,570	6.86
Total votes		1,392,366	100

==== Republican primary ====
Superintendent of Public Instruction Republican primary
Party	Candidate	Votes	%
Republican	Wiley B. Garvin	586,199	100
Write-in	Others	3	0.00
Total votes		586,202	100

==== General election ====
Superintendent of Public Instruction election
Party	Candidate	Votes	%
Democratic	John A. Wieland (incumbent)	1,559,286½	51.35
Republican	Wiley B. Garvin	1,466,167	48.29
Prohibition	J. Oliver Buswell, Jr.	10,971	0.36
Write-in	Others	28	0.00
Total votes		3,036,452	100

=== Clerk of the Supreme Court ===
1938 Illinois Clerk of the Supreme Court election
- November 8, 1938
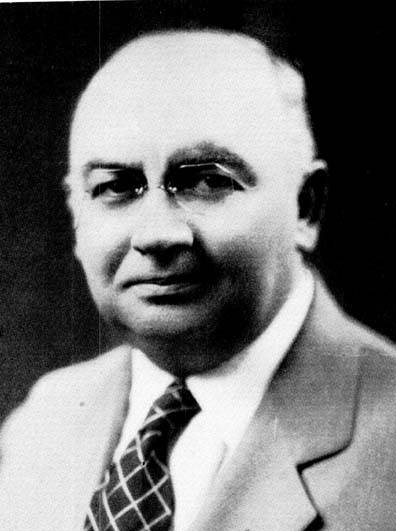

Nominee	Adam F. Bloch	George E. Lambur, Jr.
Party	Democratic	Republican
Popular vote	1,574,010	1,473,902
Percentage	51.47%	48.20%
Clerk before election
Adam F. Bloch
Democratic
Elected Clerk
Adam F. Bloch
Democratic

Incumbent first-term Clerk of the Supreme Court, Democrat Adam F. Bloch, was reelected.

==== Democratic primary ====
Clerk of the Supreme Court Democratic primary
Party	Candidate	Votes	%
Democratic	Adam F. Bloch	554,875	40.15
Democratic	Walter J. Orlikoski	479,148	34.67
Democratic	James E. Dolan	140,070	10.14
Democratic	R. William Buckley	99,358	7.19
Democratic	George Francis Keough	61,077	4.42
Democratic	Rudolph E. Stastney	47,438	3.43
Total votes		1,381,966	100

==== Republican primary ====
Clerk of the Supreme Court Republican primary
Party	Candidate	Votes	%
Republican	George E. Lambur, Jr.	238,612	37.53
Republican	Charles W. Vail	179,995	28.31
Republican	Shelton L. Smith	136,193	21.42
Republican	Sanford F. Giles	80,970	12.74
Total votes		635,770	100

==== General election ====
Clerk of the Supreme Court election
Party	Candidate	Votes	%
Democratic	Adam F. Bloch	1,574,010	51.47
Republican	George E. Lambur, Jr.	1,473,902	48.20
Prohibition	Harry D. Penwell	10,077	0.33
Write-in	Others	3	0.00
Total votes		3,057,992	100

=== State Senate ===
Seats in the Illinois Senate were up for election in 1938. Democrats retained control of the chamber.

=== State House of Representatives ===
Seats in the Illinois House of Representatives were up for election in 1938. Republicans flipped control of the chamber.

=== Trustees of University of Illinois ===
1938 Trustees of University of Illinois election
- November 8, 1938

An election was held for three of nine seats for Trustees of University of Illinois. All three Democratic nominees won.

Incumbent first-term Democrats Orville M. Karraker and Karl A. Meyer were reelected. New Democratic member Frank A. Jensen was also elected.

Incumbent Democrat was Nellie V. Freeman was not renominated.

Trustees of the University of Illinois election
Party	Candidate	Votes	%
Democratic	Dr. Karl A. Meyer (incumbent)	1,594,990	17.62
Democratic	Frank A. Jensen	1,570,509½	17.35
Democratic	O. M. Karraker	1,520,824	16.80
Republican	Albert I. Appleton	1,453,439½	16.06
Republican	Frank M. White	1,444,463	15.96
Republican	Frank H. McKelvey	1,433,075½	15.83
Prohibition	Mildred E. Young	12,492½	0.14
Prohibition	Maude S. Stowell	11,400½	0.13
Prohibition	Lena Duell Vincen	10,636	0.12
Write-in	Others	10	0.00
Total votes		9,051,840½	100

=== Judicial elections ===
==== Supreme Court ====
On June 27, 1938, one district of the Supreme Court of Illinois had a special election.

===== 3rd district special election =====
A special election was held for the seat of the court's 3rd district, after the death in office of Lott R. Herrick. Republican Walter T. Gunn won the election.

3rd district Supreme Court of Illinois special election
Party	Candidate	Votes	%
Republican	Walter T. Gunn	80,592	54.78
Democratic	Joseph L. McLaughlin	66,525	45.22
write-in	scattering	1	0.00
Total votes		147,118	100

=== Ballot measure ===
One ballot measure was put before voters in 1938, a legislatively referred constitutional amendment

==== Illinois Banking Amendment ====
The Illinois Banking Amendment, a proposed legislatively referred constitutional amendment to Sections 5, 6, 7 and 8, of Article XI of the 1870 Illinois Constitution, failed to meet the threshold for approval. In order to be approved, legislatively referred constitutional amendments required approval equal to a majority of voters voting in the entire general election.

If approved, this amendment would have made modifications to state banking rules that would have reduced the liability of bank stockholders.

Illinois Banking Amendment
Option	Votes	% of all ballots cast
Yes	979,892	29.92
No	352,428	10.76
Total votes	1,332,320	40.68

=== Advisory referendum ===
One advisory referendum ("question of public policy") was put before voters.

==== National Draft for War on Foreign Soil Question ====
An advisory question was voted on, which asked voters whether the states United States congressmen should vote against a national military draft. Those who voted overwhelmingly instructed congressmen to vote against a national military draft.

National Draft for War on Foreign Soil Question
Candidate	Votes	%
Yes	1,678,352	63.67
No	957,696	36.33
Total votes	2,636,048	100

== Local elections ==
Local elections were held.
