= 1940 Illinois elections =

- November 5, 1940

Elections were held in Illinois on Tuesday, November 5, 1940.

Primaries were held April 9, 1940.

While the Democratic ticket of Franklin D. Roosevelt and Henry A. Wallace won the state's electors in the presidential election, the election overall saw significant victories for the Republican Party. The Republican Party retained their control of the Illinois House, and flipped control of the Illinois Senate, as well as control of the executive offices of governor, lieutenant governor, attorney general, auditor of public accounts, and treasurer, all of which had previously been under Democratic Party control. Democrats retained their hold on the executive office of secretary of state. Additionally, Republicans won all seats up for election on the board of trustees of the University of Illinois. Republicans also won the state's special United States Senate election and flipped six Illinois seats in the United States House of Representatives.

== Election information ==
=== Turnout ===
In the primaries, 2,647,467 ballots were cast (1,503,706 Democratic and 1,143,761 Republican).

In the general election, 4,262,196 ballots were cast.

== Federal elections ==
=== United States president ===
Illinois voted for the Democratic ticket of Franklin D. Roosevelt and Henry A. Wallace.

=== United States Senate ===
Republican Charles W. Brooks unseated Democrat James M. Slattery, who had been appointed to the seat left vacant by the death in office of Democrat J. Hamilton Lewis.

=== United States House ===
All 27 Illinois seats in the United States House of Representatives were up for election in 1940.

Republicans flipped six Democratic-held seats, making the composition of Illinois' House delegation 16 Republicans and 11 Democrats.

== State elections ==
=== Governor ===
1940 Illinois gubernatorial election
- November 5, 1940
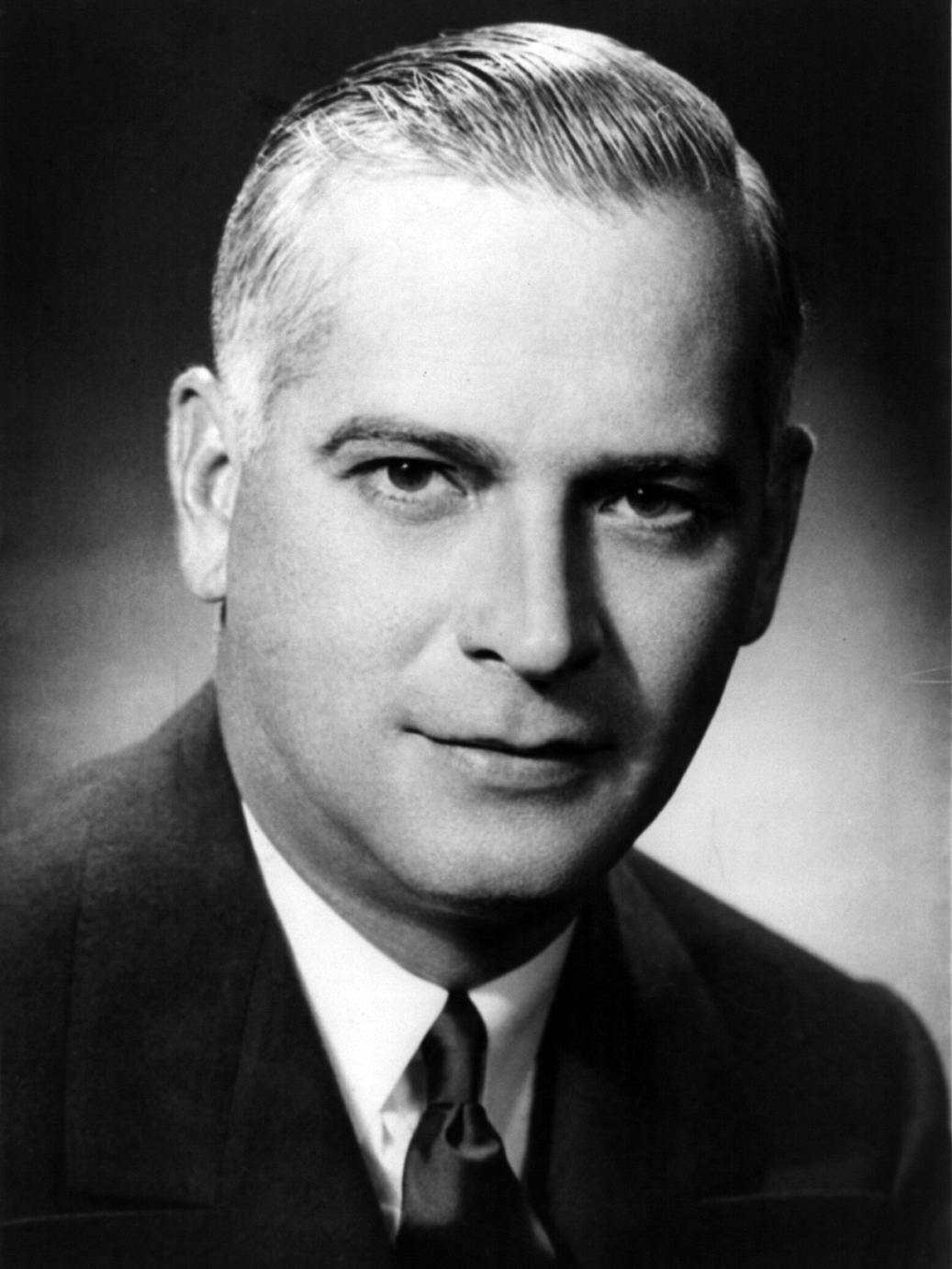

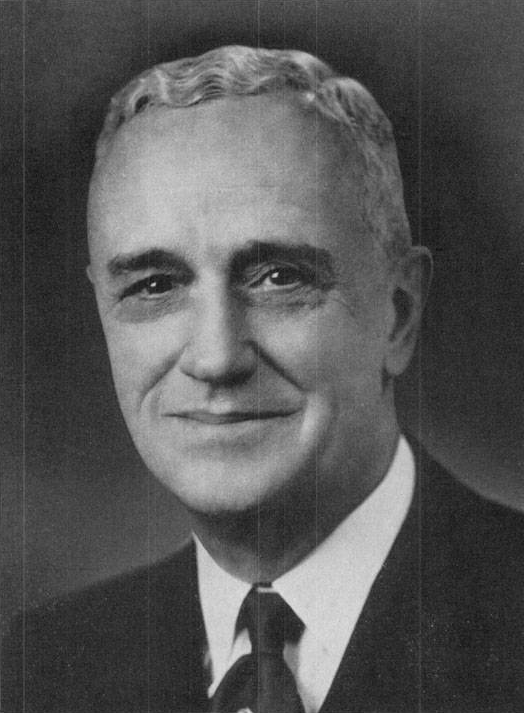
Nominee	Dwight H. Green	Harry B. Hershey
Party	Republican	Democratic
Popular vote	2,197,778	1,940,833
Percentage	52.93%	46.74%
- County results Green: 40–50% 50–60% 60–70% 70–80% Hershey: 50–60% 60–70%
Governor before election
Henry Horner (before primary)
Democratic
John Henry Stelle
(before general election)
Democratic
Elected Governor
Dwight H. Green
Republican

Before the primary, incumbent governor Henry Horner, a Democrat, opted not to seek a third term. In October, before the general election, his death in office made John Henry Stelle assume the governorship. However, Stelle had previously failed to win the Democratic nomination in the primary.

Republican Dwight H. Green won the election.

==== Democratic primary ====
===== Candidates =====
- Harry B. Hershey, former mayor of Taylorville
- Albert Lagerstedt, unsuccessful candidate for Democratic nomination in 1938 United States Senate election in Illinois
- Robert W. McKinlay
- James O. Monroe
- John H. Stelle, incumbent lieutenant governor of Illinois

===== Results =====
Gubernatorial Democratic primary
Party	Candidate	Votes	%
Democratic	Harry B. Hershey	815,604	59.73
Democratic	John H. Stelle	484,454	35.48
Democratic	Robert W. McKinlay	27,593	2.02
Democratic	James O. Monroe	24,862	1.82
Democratic	Albert Lagerstedt	12,925	0.95
Write-in	Others	2	0.00
Total votes		1,365,440	100

==== Republican primary ====
===== Candidates =====
- Dwight H. Green, Republican nominee for mayor of Chicago in 1939
- Richard J. Lyons, former Illinois state representative

Gubernatorial Republican primary
Party	Candidate	Votes	%
Republican	Dwight H. Green	610,025	57.14
Republican	Richard J. Lyons	457,643	42.86
Total votes		1,067,668	100

==== General election ====
Gubernatorial election
Party	Candidate	Votes	%
Republican	Dwight H. Green	2,197,778	52.93
Democratic	Harry B. Hershey	1,940,833	46.74
Socialist Labor	Arthur G. McDowell	7,523	0.18
Prohibition	Clay Freeman Gaumer	6,467	0.16
Total votes		4,152,622	100

=== Lieutenant governor ===
1940 Illinois lieutenant gubernatorial election
- November 5, 1940
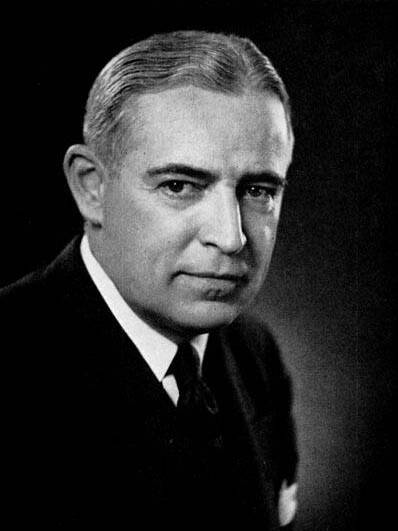

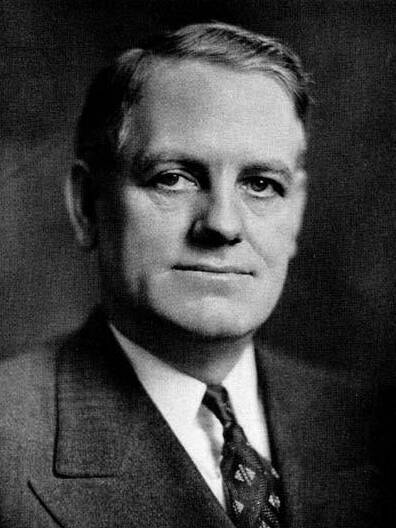
Nominee	Hugh W. Cross	Louie E. Lewis
Party	Republican	Democratic
Popular vote	2,073,679	1,955,834
Percentage	51.27%	48.36%
- County results Cross: 50–60% 60–70% 70–80% Lewis: 40–50% 50–60%
Lieutenant Governor before election
John Henry Stelle (before primary)
Democratic Party
Vacant (before general election)
Elected Lieutenant Governor
Hugh W. Cross
Republican

Incumbent lieutenant governor John Henry Stelle, a Democrat, did not seek reelection to a second term, instead opting to run for governor. Republican Hugh W. Cross was elected to succeed him.

==== Democratic primary ====
===== Candidates =====
- Louie E. Lewis, Illinois treasurer
- George M. Maypole, Illinois state senator

===== Results =====
Lieutenant gubernatorial Democratic primary
Party	Candidate	Votes	%
Democratic	Louie E. Lewis	945,586	77.47
Democratic	George M. Maypole	275,016	22.53
Total votes		1,220,602	100

==== Republican primary ====
===== Candidates =====
- John V. Clinnin, unsuccessful candidate for Republican nomination for lieutenant governor in 1936
- Guy C. Crapple
- Hugh W. Cross, state representative
- Charles Hindley
- William C. Jerome
- Arnold L. Lund, Republican nominee for the 6th congressional district in 1934
- Earle Benjamin Searcy, Illinois state senator

===== Results =====
Lieutenant gubernatorial Republican primary
Party	Candidate	Votes	%
Republican	Hugh W. Cross	390,941	41.53
Republican	Arnold L. Lund	216,471	22.99
Republican	Earle B. Searcy	168,692	17.92
Republican	John V. Clinnin	61,049	6.49
Republican	Charles Hindley	43,461	4.62
Republican	William C. Jerome	40,671	4.32
Republican	Guy C. Crapple	20,132	2.14
Write-in	Others	1	0.00
Total votes		941,418	100

==== General election ====
Lieutenant gubernatorial election
Party	Candidate	Votes	%
Republican	Hugh W. Cross	2,073,679	51.27
Democratic	Louie E. Lewis	1,955,834	48.36
Socialist	Joe Tonielli	7,695	0.19
Prohibition	Henry Johnson Long	7,181	0.18
Total votes		3,882,439	100

=== Attorney general ===
1940 Illinois Attorney General election
- November 5, 1940
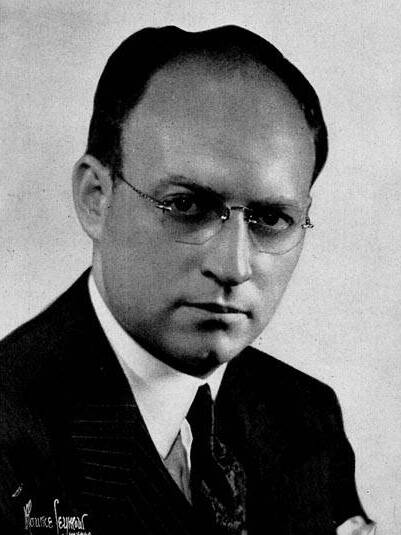

Nominee	George F. Barrett	Harold G. Ward
Party	Republican	Democratic
Popular vote	2,061,807	1,956,744
Percentage	51.12%	48.51%
- County results Barrett: 40–50% 50–60% 60–70% 70–80% Ward: 40–50% 50–60%
Attorney General before election
John Edward Cassidy
Democratic
Elected Attorney General
George F. Barrett
Republican

Incumbent Attorney General John Edward Cassidy, a Democrat appointed in 1938 after fellow Democrat Otto Kerner Sr. resigned to accept a federal judgeship, did not seek reelection to a full term. Republican George F. Barrett was elected to succeed him.

==== Democratic primary ====
Attorney General Democratic primary
Party	Candidate	Votes	%
Democratic	Harold G. Ward	821,247	73.10
Democratic	Samuel H. Block	302,184	26.90
Total votes		1,123,431	100

==== Republican primary ====
===== Candidates =====
- George F. Barrett
- Oscar E. Carlstrom, former Illinois attorney general
- Frank R. Eagleton, former assistant Illinois attorney general
- Charles W. Hadley
- Edward A. Hayes, former commander of the American Legion
- George Landon

===== Results =====
Attorney General Republican primary
Party	Candidate	Votes	%
Republican	George F. Barrett	277,744	29.41
Republican	Edward A. Hayes	253,555	26.85
Republican	Oscar E. Carlstrom	241,739	25.60
Republican	Charles W. Hadley	102,358	10.84
Republican	George Landon	53,461	5.66
Republican	Frank R. Eagleton	15,468	1.64
Total votes		944,325	100

==== General election ====
Attorney General election
Party	Candidate	Votes	%
Republican	George F. Barrett	2,061,807	51.12
Democratic	Harold G. Ward	1,956,744	48.51
Socialist	Kellam Foster	7,819	0.19
Prohibition	Joseph L. Shaw	7,090	0.18
Write-in	Others	11	0.00
Total votes		4,033,460	100

=== Secretary of State ===
1940 Illinois Secretary of State election
- November 5, 1940
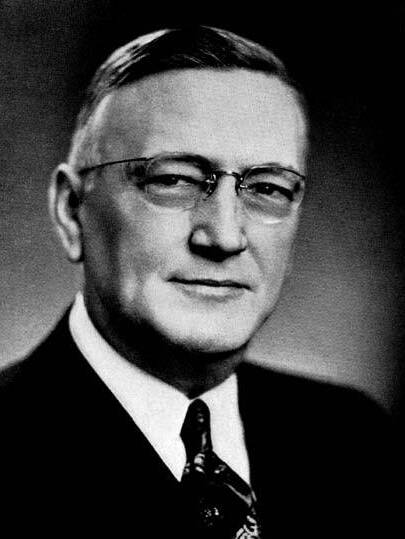

Nominee	Edward J. Hughes	Justus L. Johnson
Party	Democratic	Republican
Popular vote	2,095,698	1,962,405
Percentage	51.46%	48.19%
- County results Hughes: 40–50% 50–60% 60–70% Johnson: 40–50% 50–60% 60–70% 70–80%
Secretary of State before election
Edward J. Hughes
Democratic
Elected Secretary of State
Edward J. Hughes
Democratic

Incumbent second-term Secretary of State Edward J. Hughes, a Democrat, was reelected.

==== Democratic primary ====
Secretary of State Democratic primary
Party	Candidate	Votes	%
Democratic	Edward J. Hughes (incumbent)	1,167,788	100
Write-in	Others	1	0.00
Total votes		1,167,789	100

==== Republican primary ====
Justus L. Johnson won the Republican primary, defeating businessman Richard Yates Rowe and Illinois state senator Arthur J. Bidwill.

Secretary of State Republican primary
Party	Candidate	Votes	%
Republican	Justus L. Johnson	349,731	37.10
Republican	Richard Yates Rowe	297,795	31.59
Republican	Arthur J. Bidwill	295,136	31.31
Total votes		942,662	100

==== General election ====
Secretary of State election
Party	Candidate	Votes	%
Democratic	Edward J. Hughes (incumbent)	2,095,698	51.46
Republican	Justus L. Johnson	1,962,405	48.19
Socialist	Mordecai Shulman	7,700	0.19
Prohibition	Harriet L. McBride	6,829	0.17
Write-in	Others	11	0.00
Total votes		4,072,632	100

=== Auditor of Public Accounts ===
1940 Illinois Auditor of Public Accounts election
- November 5, 1940
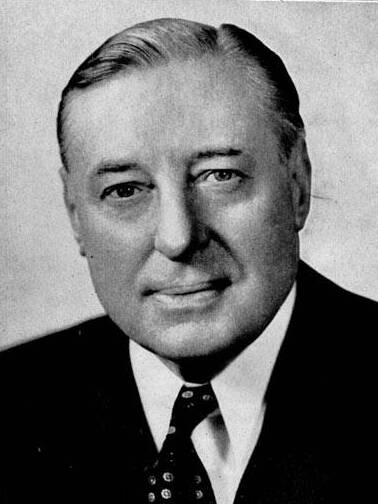

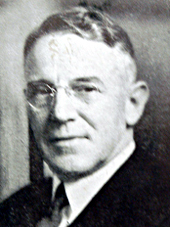
Nominee	Arthur C. Lueder	John C. Martin
Party	Republican	Democratic
Popular vote	2,027,571	1,988,366
Percentage	50.30%	49.33%
- County results Lueder: 50–60% 60–70% 70–80% Martin: 40–50% 50–60%
Auditor of Public Accounts before election
Edward J. Barrett
Democratic
Elected Auditor of Public Accounts
Arthur C. Lueder
Republican

Incumbent third-term Auditor of Public Accounts Edward J. Barrett, lost renomination in the Democratic primary. Republican Arthur C. Lueder was elected to succeed him.

==== Democratic primary ====
Incumbent Edward J. Barrett narrowly lost renomination to U.S. congressman and former Illinois state treasurer John C. Martin.

Auditor of Public Accounts Democratic primary
Party	Candidate	Votes	%
Democratic	John C. Martin	630,729	50.72
Democratic	Edward J. Barrett (incumbent)	612,914	49.28
Total votes		1,243,643	100

==== Republican primary ====
===== Candidates =====
- John William Chapman, former Chicago alderman
- Henry G. Hansen
- Arthur C. Lueder, former Chicago postmaster and Republican nominee for mayor of Chicago in 1923
- William R. McCauley
- Oscar Nelson, former Illinois auditor of public accounts, former Chicago alderman, former interim president of the Building Service Employees International Union
- Edward A. O'Connor
- Edward T. O'Connor
- Charles W. Vail

===== Results =====
Auditor of Public Accounts Republican primary
Party	Candidate	Votes	%
Republican	Arthur C. Lueder	261,541	28.18
Republican	William R. McCauley	147,274	15.87
Republican	Oscar Nelson	141,750	15.27
Republican	Edward T. O'Connor	101,983	10.99
Republican	Charles W. Vail	70,852	7.63
Republican	John William Chapman	64,717	6.97
Republican	Harry W. Nelson	58,321	6.28
Republican	Henry G. Hansen	40,044	4.31
Republican	Joseph Edward Scanlon	22,103	2.38
Republican	Edward A. O'Connor	19,608	2.11
Total votes		928,193	100

==== General election ====
Auditor of Public Accounts election
Party	Candidate	Votes	%
Republican	Arthur C. Lueder	2,027,571	50.30
Democratic	John C. Martin	1,988,366	49.33
Socialist	Georgia Albright	7,896	0.20
Prohibition	Carl T . E. Schultze	6,884	0.17
Write-in	Others	10	0.00
Total votes		4,030,727	100

=== Treasurer ===
1940 Illinois State Treasurer election
- November 5, 1940
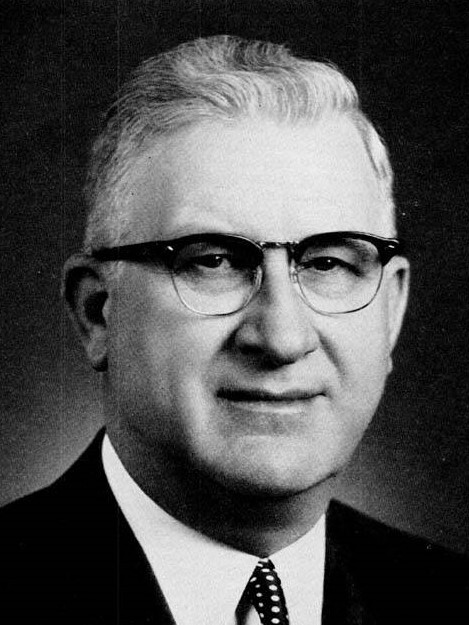

Nominee	Warren Wright	Homer Mat Adams
Party	Republican	Democratic
Popular vote	2,030,513	1,983,667
Percentage	50.40%	49.24%
- County results Wright: 50–60% 60–70% 70–80% Adams: 40–50% 50–60%
Treasurer before election
Louie E. Lewis
Democratic
Elected Treasurer
Warren Wright
Republican

Incumbent first-term Treasurer Louie E. Lewis, a Democrat, did not seek reelection, instead running for lieutenant governor. Republican Warren Wright was elected to succeed him in office.

==== Democratic primary ====
Treasurer Democratic primary
Party	Candidate	Votes	%
Democratic	Homer Mat Adams	805,964	70.90
Democratic	Edwin C. Gordon	330,733	29.10
Total votes		1,136,697	100

==== Republican primary ====
Treasurer Republican primary
Party	Candidate	Votes	%
Republican	Warren Wright	378,168	42.33
Republican	A. C. Lewis	278,112	31.130
Republican	Howard W. Trovillion	111,169	12.44
Republican	James A. Dayton	94,078	10.53
Republican	Frank J. Store	31,839	3.56
Total votes		893,366	100

==== General election ====
Treasurer election
Party	Candidate	Votes	%
Republican	Warren Wright	2,030,513	50.40
Democratic	Homer Mat Adams	1,983,667	49.24
Socialist	Ina M. White	7,890	0.20
Prohibition	John H. Everitt	6,894	0.17
Total votes		4,028,964	100

=== State Senate ===
Seats of the Illinois Senate were up for election in 1940. Republicans flipped control of the chamber.

=== State House of Representatives ===
Seats in the Illinois House of Representatives were up for election in 1940. Republicans retained control of the chamber.

=== University of Illinois trustees ===
1940 University of Illinois trustees elections
- November 5, 1940

4 out of 9 seats on the University of Illinois Board of Trustees 5 seats needed for a majority
	Majority party	Minority party
Party	Democratic	Republican
Seats before	9	0
Seats after	5	4
Seat change	▼4	▲4
Popular vote	7,717,234^{A}	7,900,386½^{[B]}
Percentage	49.27%^{[C]}	50.44%^{[D]}
Swing	▼5.99%	▲2.59%
Seats up	4	0
Races won	0	4

An election was held for three of the nine seats for Trustees of University of Illinois to six year terms, and a special election was held to fill the partial term of a seat that was vacated. Republicans swept all four seats in the two elections. The election was for six-year terms.

==== Regular election ====
1940 University of Illinois trustees (regular election)
- November 5, 1940

3 out of 9 seats on the University of Illinois Board of Trustees
	Majority party	Minority party
Party	Republican	Democratic
Popular vote	5,957,269	5,806,332
Percentage	50.44%	49.16%
Swing	▲2.59%	▼2.61%
Seats up	0	3
Races won	3	0

An election was held for three six-year terms to the board.

Former two-term Republican member Helen M. H. Grigsby was returned to the board. New Republican members John R. Fornof and Park Livingston were elected to the board.

Incumbent first-term Democrat Marie Coyle Plumb lost reelection.

First-term Democrats Oscar G. Mayer Sr. and Harold Pogue did not seek reelection.

Marie Coyle Plumb was listed on the ballot as "Mrs. Glenn E. Plumb", and Beulah Campbell was listed as "Belulah (Mrs. Bruce A.) Campbell".

University of Illinois trustees election
Party	Candidate	Votes	%
Republican	Park Livingston	2,017,302½	17.08
Republican	Helen Mathews Grigsby	1,972,433	16.70
Republican	John R. Fornof	1,967,534	16.66
Democratic	W. E. C. Clifford	1,954,221½	16.55
Democratic	Beulah (Mrs. Bruce A.) Campbell	1,941,938½	16.44
Democratic	Mrs. Glenn E. Plumb	1,910,171½	16.17
Socialist	Kate M. Ward	8,286	0.07
Socialist	Jack Sessions	8,001	0.07
Socialist	Eva S. Cowan	7,927	0.07
Prohibition	Mildred E. Young	7,631½	0.07
Prohibition	Maude Swits Stowell	7,420½	0.06
Prohibition	Lois Gilbert Krandell	7,270½	0.06
Write-in	Others	39	0.00
Total votes		11,810,176½	100

==== Special election ====
1940 University of Illinois trustee special election
- November 5, 1940
Nominee	Chester R. Davis	Kenney E. Williamson
Party	Republican	Democratic
Popular vote	1,943,117	1,910,902
Percentage	50.42%	49.58%
Trustee before election
Kenney E. Williamson
Democratic
Elected Trustee
Chester R. Davis
Republican

A special election was held to fill the term left vacant by the death in office of Democrat Louis Conrad Moschel in 1940. Republican Chester R. Davis was elected, defeating incumbent Kenny E. Williamson (who had been appointed to hold the seat after the death of Moschel).

University of Illinois trustee special election
Party	Candidate	Votes	%
Republican	Chester R. Davis	1,943,117	50.42
Democratic	Kenney E. Williamson (incumbent)	1,910,902	49.58
Total votes		3,854,019	100

=== Judicial elections ===
On June 3, 1940, an election was held for judges of the Superior Court of Cook County.

On November 5, 1940, an election was held to fill a vacancy on the Eighth Judicial Circuit.

=== Ballot measure ===
A legislatively referred state statute was brought before the voters.

==== Illinois Banking Law Amendment ====
Voters approved the Illinois Banking Law Amendment, a legislatively referred state statute which made it easier to establish new banks in small municipalities that lack banks. It amended sections 11 and 12 of the general banking law.

Illinois Banking Law Amendment
Candidate	Votes	%
Yes	775,170	68.10
No	363,136	31.90
Total votes	1,138,306	100

Amendment results by county Yes: 80–90%; 70–80%; 60–70%; 50–60%; No: 50–60%

== Local elections ==
Local elections were held.

== Notes ==
^A 5,806,332½ in regular election and 1,910,902 in special election
^B 5,957,269½ in regular election and 1,943,117 in special election
^C 49.16% of regular election and 49.58% of special election
^D 50.44% of regular election and 50.42% of special election
