= 1944 Illinois elections =

- November 7, 1944

Elections were held in Illinois on Tuesday, November 7, 1944.

Primaries were held April 11, 1944.

== Election information ==
=== Turnout ===
In the primaries, 1,428,685 ballots were cast (635,487 Democratic and 793,198 Republican).

In the general election, 4,079,024 ballots were cast.

== Federal elections ==
=== United States President ===
Illinois voted for the Democratic ticket of Franklin D. Roosevelt and Harry S. Truman.

=== United States Senate ===
Incumbent Democrat Scott W. Lucas won reelection to a second term.

=== United States House ===
All 26 Illinois seats in the United States House of Representatives were up for election in 1944.

Democrats flipped four Republican-held seats, making the composition of Illinois' House delegation 15 Republicans and 11 Democrats.

== State elections ==
=== Governor ===
1944 Illinois gubernatorial election
- November 7, 1944
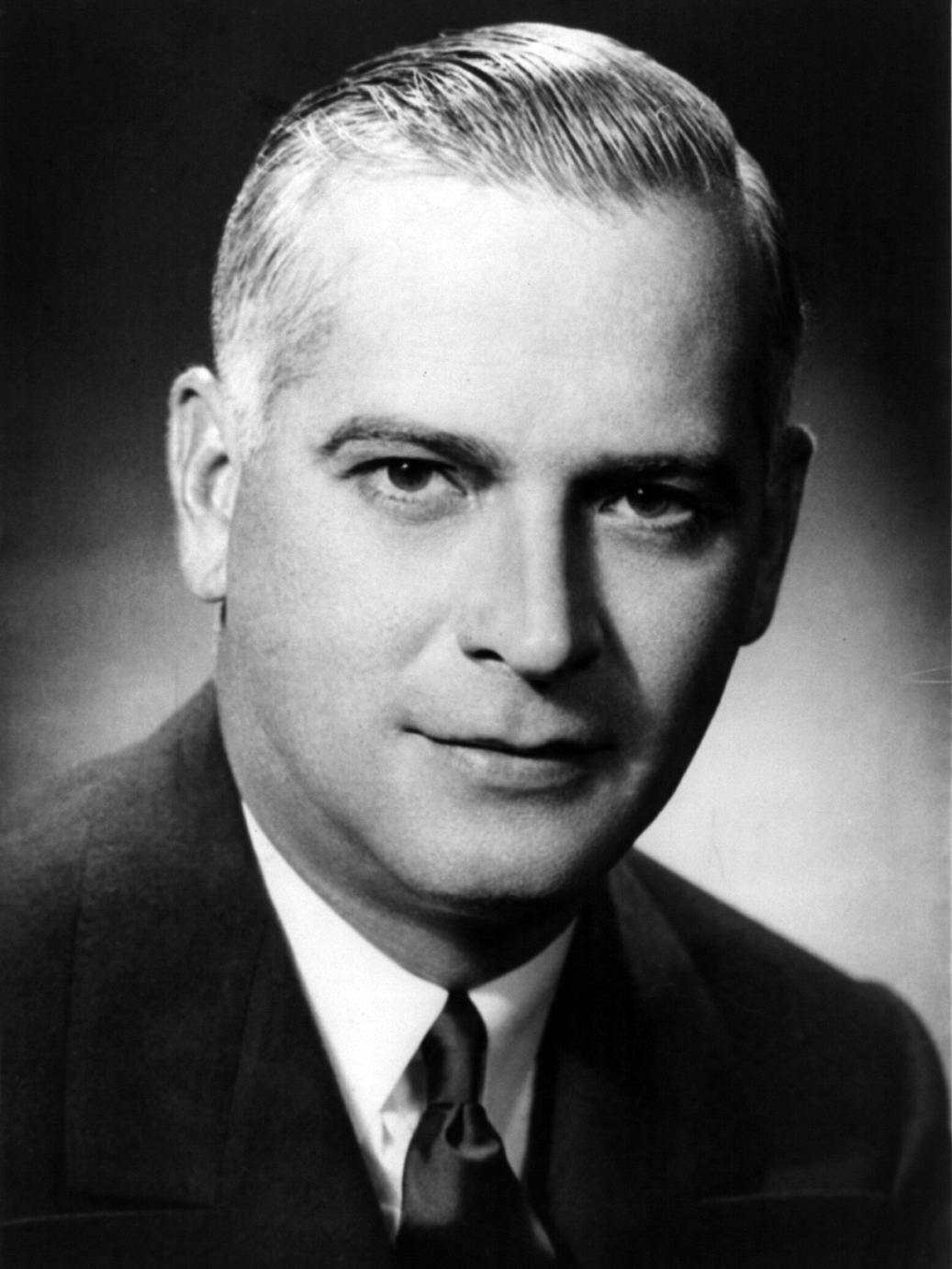

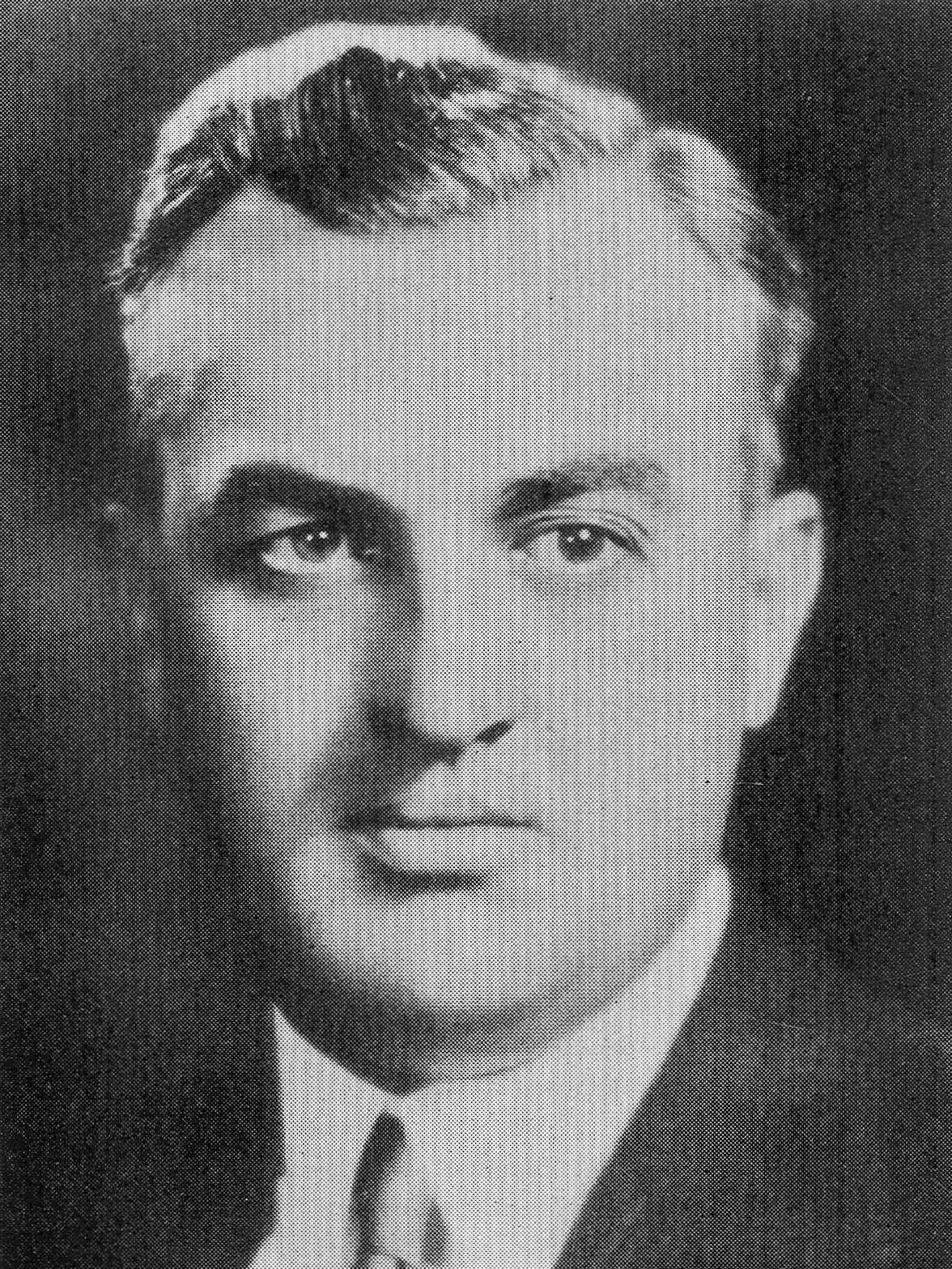
Nominee	Dwight H. Green	Thomas J. Courtney
Party	Republican	Democratic
Popular vote	2,013,270	1,940,999
Percentage	50.75%	48.93%
- County Results Green: 50–60% 60–70% 70–80% Courtney: 50–60% 60–70%
Governor before election
Dwight H. Green
Republican
Elected Governor
Dwight H. Green
Republican

Incumbent Governor Dwight H. Green, a Republican, was reelected to a second term.

==== Democratic primary ====
Gubernatorial Democratic primary
Party	Candidate	Votes	%
Democratic	Thomas J. Courtney	531,134	100
Write-in	Others	1	0.00
Total votes		531,135	100

==== Republican primary ====
Gubernatorial Republican primary
Party	Candidate	Votes	%
Republican	Dwight H. Green (incumbent)	621,286	86.16
Republican	Oscar E. Carlstrom	99,831	13.84
Total votes		721,117	100

==== General election ====
Gubernatorial election
Party	Candidate	Votes	%
Republican	Dwight H. Green (incumbent)	2,013,270	50.75
Democratic	Thomas J. Courtney	1,940,999	48.93
Socialist Labor	Charles Storm	6,906	0.17
Prohibition	Willis Ray Wilson	5,590	0.14
Total votes		3,966,765	100

=== Lieutenant governor ===
1944 Illinois lieutenant gubernatorial election
- November 7, 1944
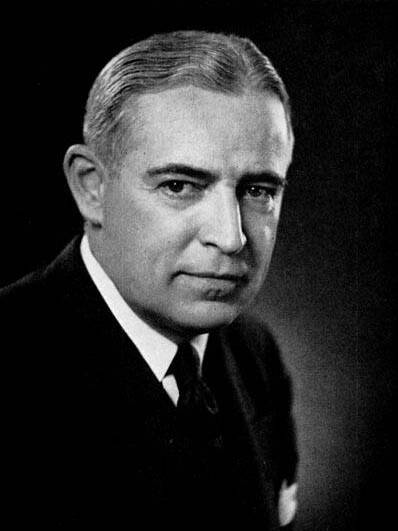

Nominee	Hugh W. Cross	Edward C. Hunter
Party	Republican	Democratic
Popular vote	1,950,767	1,919,029
Percentage	50.25%	49.43%
Lieutenant Governor before election
Hugh W. Cross
Republican
Elected Lieutenant Governor
Hugh W. Cross
Republican

Incumbent lieutenant governor Hugh W. Cross, a Republican, was reelected to a second term.

==== Democratic primary ====
Lieutenant gubernatorial Democratic primary
Party	Candidate	Votes	%
Democratic	Edward C. "Ted" Hunter	487,810	100
Total votes		487,810	100

==== Republican primary ====
Lieutenant gubernatorial Republican primary
Party	Candidate	Votes	%
Republican	Hugh W. Cross (incumbent)	613,829	100
Write-in	Others	1	0.00
Total votes		613,830	100

==== General election ====
Lieutenant gubernatorial election
Party	Candidate	Votes	%
Republican	Hugh W. Cross (incumbent)	1,950,767	50.25
Democratic	Edward C. "Ted" Hunter	1,919,029	49.43
Socialist Labor	Gregory P. Lyngas	6,816	0.18
Prohibition	Henry Johnson Long	5,827	0.15
Total votes		3,882,439	100

=== Attorney general ===
1944 Illinois Attorney General election
- November 7, 1944
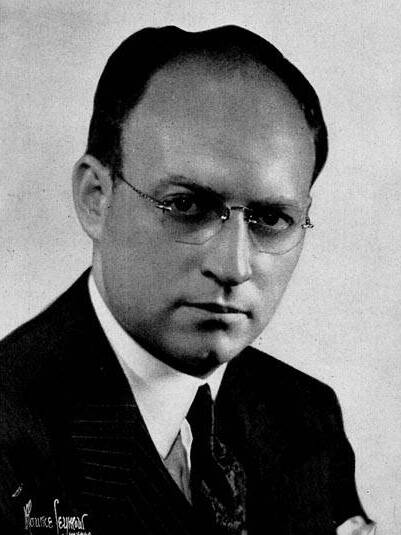

Nominee	George F. Barrett	Sveinbjorn Johnson
Party	Republican	Democratic
Popular vote	1,959,836	1,906,110
Percentage	50.53%	49.15%
Attorney General before election
George F. Barrett
Republican
Elected Attorney General
George F. Barrett
Republican

Incumbent attorney general George F. Barrett, a Republican, won reelection to second term.

==== Democratic primary ====
Attorney General Democratic primary
Party	Candidate	Votes	%
Democratic	Sveinbjorn Johnson	467,934	100
Total votes		467,934	100

==== Republican primary ====
Attorney General Republican primary
Party	Candidate	Votes	%
Republican	George F. Barrett (incumbent)	554,353	86.13
Republican	Lloyd C. Moody	89,306	13.88
Total votes		643,659	100

==== General election ====
Attorney General election
Party	Candidate	Votes	%
Republican	George F. Barrett (incumbent)	1,959,836	50.53
Democratic	Sveinbjorn Johnson	1,906,110	49.15
Socialist Labor	Tony Berchon	6,658	0.17
Prohibition	Frederick Juchhoff	5,729	0.15
Total votes		3,878,333	100

=== Secretary of State ===
1944 Illinois Secretary of State election
- November 7, 1944
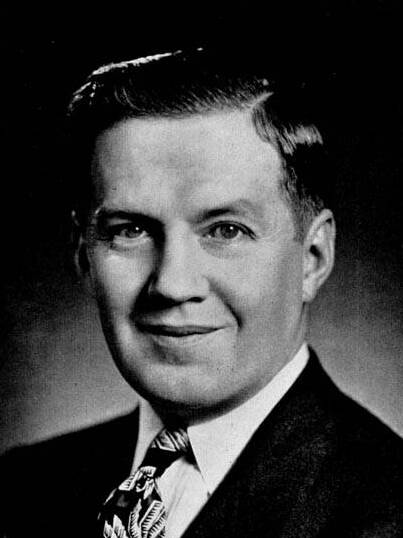

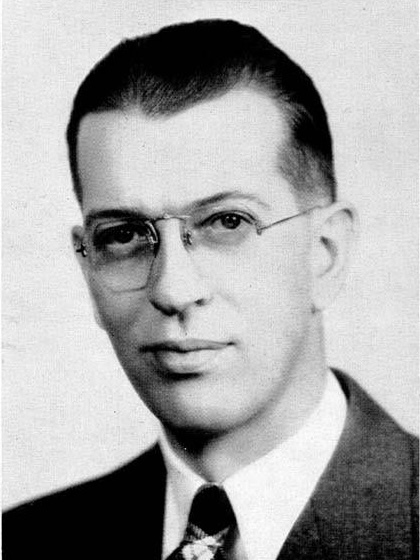
Nominee	Edward J. Barrett	Arnold P. Benson
Party	Democratic	Republican
Popular vote	2,003,057	1,886,876
Percentage	51.33%	48.35%
- County results Barrett: 50–60% Benson: 40–50% 50–60% 60–70% 70–80%
Secretary of State before election
Richard Yates Rowe
Republican
Elected Secretary of State
Edward J. Barrett
Democratic

Incumbent third-term Secretary of State Edward J. Hughes, a Democrat, did not seek reelection. Hughes then died before the general election, and in June 1944, Richard Yates Rowe, a Republican, was appointed to fill the rest of his term. In the election, Democrat Edward J. Barrett was elected to permanently succeed them in office.

==== Democratic primary ====
Secretary of State Democratic primary
Party	Candidate	Votes	%
Democratic	Edward J. Barrett	505,699	100
Write-in	Others	1	0.00
Total votes		505,700	100

==== Republican primary ====
Arnold P. Benson, the president pro tempore of the Illinois Senate, won the Republican primary, defeating incumbent Illinois Treasurer and former congressman William Stratton.

Secretary of State Republican primary
Party	Candidate	Votes	%
Republican	Arnold P. Benson	401,040	57.00
Republican	William G. Stratton	302,539	43.00
Total votes		703,579	100

==== General election ====
Secretary of State election
Party	Candidate	Votes	%
Democratic	Edward J. Barrett	2,003,057	51.33
Republican	Arnold P. Benson	1,886,876	48.35
Socialist Labor	Louis Fisher	6,927	0.18
Prohibition	Robert W. Melven	5,740	0.15
Write-in	Others	1	0.00
Total votes		3,902,601	100

=== Auditor of Public Accounts ===
1944 Illinois Auditor of Public Accounts election
- November 7, 1944
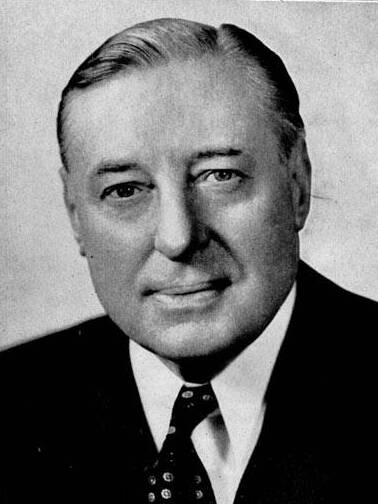

Nominee	Arthur C. Lueder	William Vicars
Party	Republican	Democratic
Popular vote	1,951,828	1,910,269
Percentage	50.37%	49.30%
Auditor of Public Accounts before election
Arthur C. Lueder
Republican
Elected Auditor of Public Accounts
Arthur C. Lueder
Republican

Incumbent Auditor of Public Accounts Arthur C. Lueder, a Republican, was reelected to a second term.

==== Democratic primary ====
Auditor of Public Accounts Democratic primary
Party	Candidate	Votes	%
Democratic	William Vicars	468,933	100
Total votes		468,933	100

==== Republican primary ====
Auditor of Public Accounts Republican primary
Party	Candidate	Votes	%
Republican	Arthur C. Lueder (incumbent)	606,531	100
Total votes		606,531	100

==== General election ====
Auditor of Public Accounts election
Party	Candidate	Votes	%
Republican	Arthur C. Lueder (incumbent)	1,951,828	50.37
Democratic	William Vicars	1,910,269	49.30
Socialist Labor	O. Alfred Olson	7,132	0.18
Prohibition	Arthur McFall	5,808	0.15
Total votes		3,875,037	100

=== Treasurer ===
1944 Illinois State Treasurer election
- November 7, 1944
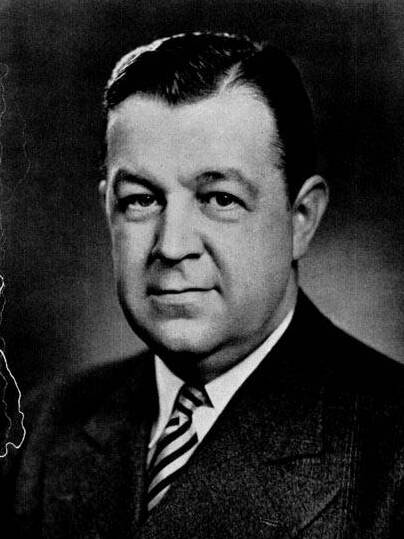

Nominee	Conrad F. Becker	Earl W. Merritt
Party	Republican	Democratic
Popular vote	1,933,705	1,918,595
Percentage	50.03%	49.64%
- County results Becker: 50–60% 60–70% 70–80% Merritt: 50–60%
Treasurer before election
William G. Stratton
Republican
Elected Treasurer
Conrad F. Becker
Republican

Incumbent first-term Treasurer William G. Stratton, a Republican, did not seek reelection, instead opting to run for Secretary of State. Republican Conrad F. Becker was elected to succeed him in office.

==== Democratic primary ====
Treasurer Democratic primary
Party	Candidate	Votes	%
Democratic	Earl W. Merritt	471,294	100
Total votes		471,294	100

==== Republican primary ====
Treasurer Republican primary
Party	Candidate	Votes	%
Republican	Conrad F. Becker	422,336	67.29
Republican	Walter W. Waite	117,506	18.72
Republican	Taylor E. Wilhelm	87,791	13.99
Write-in	Others	1	0.00
Total votes		627,633	100

==== General election ====
Treasurer election
Party	Candidate	Votes	%
Republican	Conrad F. Becker	1,933,705	50.03
Democratic	Earl W. Merritt	1,918,595	49.64
Socialist Labor	Gus Larson	7,071	0.18
Prohibition	William J. Goodman	5,838	0.15
Total votes		3,865,209	100

=== Clerk of the Supreme Court ===
1944 Illinois Clerk of the Supreme Court election
- November 7, 1944
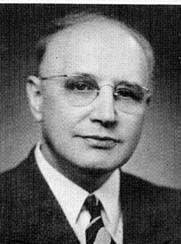

Nominee	Earle Benjamin Searcy	Casimir Griglik
Party	Republican	Democratic
Popular vote	1,953,537	1,885,321
Percentage	50.72%	48.95%
Clerk before election
Edward F. Cullinane
Democratic
Elected Clerk
Earle Benjamin Searcy
Republican

Incumbent Clerk of the Supreme Court Edward F. Cullinane, a Democrat appointed to the office in 1940 after the death in office of Adam F. Bloch, did not seek reelection. Republican Earle Benjamin Searcy was elected to succeed him in office.

==== Democratic primary ====
Clerk of the Supreme Court Democratic primary
Party	Candidate	Votes	%
Democratic	Casimir Griglik	465,397	100
Total votes		465,397	100

==== Republican primary ====
Clerk of the Supreme Court Republican primary
Party	Candidate	Votes	%
Republican	Earle Benjamin Searcy	585,325	100
Total votes		585,325	100

==== General election ====
Clerk of the Supreme Court election
Party	Candidate	Votes	%
Republican	Earle Benjamin Searcy	1,953,537	50.72
Democratic	Casimir Griglik	1,885,321	48.95
Socialist Labor	Rudy Kosic	6,798	0.18
Prohibition	Harry A. Varney	5,774	0.15
Total votes		3,851,430	100

=== State Senate ===
Seats of the Illinois Senate were up for election in 1944. Republicans retained control of the chamber.

=== State House of Representatives ===
Seats in the Illinois House of Representatives were up for election in 1944. Republicans retained control of the chamber.

=== Trustees of University of Illinois ===
1944 Trustees of University of Illinois election
- November 7, 1944

3 out of 9 seats on the University of Illinois Board of Trustees 5 seats needed for a majority
	Majority party	Minority party
Party	Republican	Democratic
Seats before	6	3
Seats after	6	3
Seat change	Steady	Steady
Popular vote	5,650,742½	5,809,521½
Percentage	49.14%	50.52%
Swing	▼4.43%	▲4.49%
Seats up	0	3
Races won	0	3

An election was held for three of the nine seats for Trustees of University of Illinois. The election was for six-year terms. All three Democratic nominees won. However, since all three seats up for election were already held by Democrats, the partisan composition of the University of Illinois Board of Trustees remained unchanged, with a 9–3 Republican majority over Democrats.

Democratic incumbent Karl A. Meyer was reelected to a third term. Democratic incumbent Kenny E. Williamson, who had been appointed to fill a vacancy in 1940 was reelected to his first full term. New Democratic member Walter W. McLaughlin was also elected. First-term Democratic incumbent Frank A. Jensen was not nominated for reelection.

Trustees of the University of Illinois election
Party	Candidate	Votes	%
Democratic	Walter W. McLaughlin	1,944,733½	16.91
Democratic	Karl A. Meyer (incumbent)	1,941,038	16.88
Democratic	Kenney E. Williamson (incumbent)	1,923,750	16.73
Republican	Charles L. Engstrom	1,899,495½	16.52
Republican	Charles S. Pillsbury	1,888,459½	16.42
Republican	Charles Wham	1,862,787½	16.20
Socialist Labor	Helen Olson	7,269½	0.06
Socialist Labor	Nada Mijanovich	7,045	0.06
Socialist Labor	Gabriele McKenzie	6,806	0.06
Prohibition	Mildred E. Young	6,083½	0.05
Prohibition	Alonzo L. Parrott	5,956	0.05
Prohibition	Clay Freeman Gaumer	5,866	0.05
Total votes		11,499,290	100

=== Ballot measures ===
Two ballot measures were put before voters in 1944. One was a legislatively referred state statute and one was a legislatively referred constitutional amendment.

In order to be approved, legislatively referred state statues required the support of a majority of those voting on the statute. In order to be approved, legislatively referred constitutional amendments required approval equal to a majority of voters voting in the entire general election.

==== Illinois County Officer Term Limit Amendment ====
Illinois County Officer Term Limit Amendment, a legislatively referred constitutional amendment which would have amended Section 8 of Article X of the Constitution of the 1870 Constitution of Illinois, failed to meet the threshold for approval.

The amendment would have removed a constitutional provision requiring elected county officers to wait for four years after their term expired before they would be eligible to hold that same office again.

Illinois County Officer Term Limit Amendment
Option	Votes	% of all ballots cast
Yes	898,107	22.02
No	653,877	16.03
Total votes	1,551,984	38.05

==== Illinois General Banking Law Amendment ====
The Illinois General Banking Law Amendment, a legislatively referred state statute which amended section 10 of the Illinois General Banking Law, was approved by voters.

Illinois General Banking Law Amendment
Candidate	Votes	%
Yes	973,159	69.12
No	434,767	30.88
Total votes	1,407,926	100

== Local elections ==
Local elections were held.
