= Edward J. Barrett (politician) =

American politician (1900–1977)

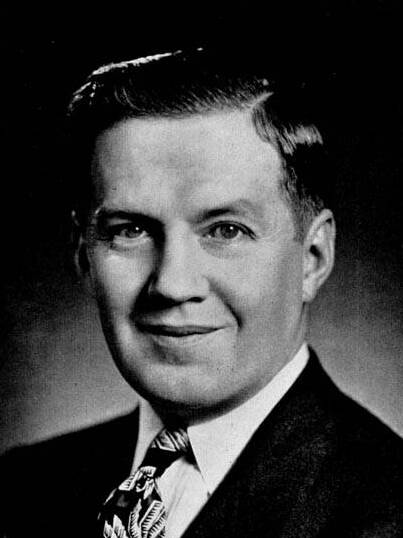
- Official portrait, circa 1945

20th Cook County Clerk
- In office 1955–1973
- Preceded by: Richard J. Daley
- Succeeded by: Stanley Kusper

28th Illinois Secretary of State
- In office 1945–1953
- Governor: Dwight H. Green; Adlai Stevenson II
- Preceded by: Richard Yates Rowe
- Succeeded by: Charles F. Carpentier

18th Illinois Auditor of Public Accounts
- In office 1933–1941
- Governor: Henry Horner; John Stelle
- Preceded by: Oscar Nelson
- Succeeded by: Arthur C. Lueder

46th Illinois Treasurer
- In office 1931–1933
- Governor: Louis L. Emmerson; Henry Horner
- Preceded by: Omer N. Custer
- Succeeded by: John C. Martin

Personal details
- Born: March 10, 1900 Chicago, Illinois, U.S.
- Died: April 4, 1977 (aged 77) Veterans Administration Hospital Lakeside, Chicago, Illinois, U.S
- Party: Democratic
- Education: Mayo College of Commerce

Military service
- Allegiance: United States
- Branch/service: Army
- Years of service: 1917–1920
- Battles/wars: World War I

Edward J. Barrett (March 10, 1900 – April 4, 1977) was an American politician.

Born in Chicago, Illinois, Barrett served in the United States Army during World War I in Europe from 1917 to 1920. He then went to Spaulding Institute and then received his bachelor's degree from Mayo College of Commerce. He worked in advertising and sales and was involved in organized labor in Chicago.

In 1932, he was elected Illinois Treasurer as a Democrat. In 1934, Barrett was elected Illinois Auditor of Public Accounts and served until 1940.

In 1941, he joined the United States Marine Corps and served as Sergeant in the South Pacific during World War II.

In 1942, he ran unsuccessfully for Illinois Treasurer. In 1944, Barrett was elected Illinois Secretary of State. Reelected in 1948, he served until after his defeat in 1952.

Barrett (left) administering an oath of office to Judge William Daley in 1959

In 1955, Barrett was appointed Cook County Clerk to replace Richard J. Daley who was elected Mayor of Chicago. Barrett served until 1973, when he was convicted of bribery, mail fraud, and income tax evasion. He was sentenced to three years in prison and fined $15,000, but was allowed house arrest because of ill health. Barrett died at Veterans Administration Hospital Lakeside, in Chicago, Illinois at age 77.

== Notes ==
Party political offices
| Preceded by George W. Alschuler | Democratic nominee for Treasurer of Illinois; 1930 | Succeeded by John C. Martin |
| Preceded by George F. Sehring | Democratic nominee for Illinois Auditor of Public Accounts; 1932, 1936 | Succeeded by John C. Martin |
| Preceded by Edward J. Hughes | Democratic nominee for Secretary of State of Illinois; 1944, 1948, 1952 | Succeeded by David F. Mallet |
Political offices
| Preceded by Omer N. Custer | Treasurer of Illinois; 1931–1933 | Succeeded by John C. Martin |
| Preceded by Oscar Nelson | Illinois Auditor of Public Accounts; 1933–1941 | Succeeded by Arthur C. Lueder |
| Preceded by Richard Yates Rowe | Secretary of State of Illinois; 1945–1953 | Succeeded by Charles F. Carpentier |
| Preceded by Richard J. Daley | Cook County Clerk; 1955–1973 | Succeeded by Stanley Kusper |
