= Hugh W. Cross =

American politician, lawyer, farmer, and businessman

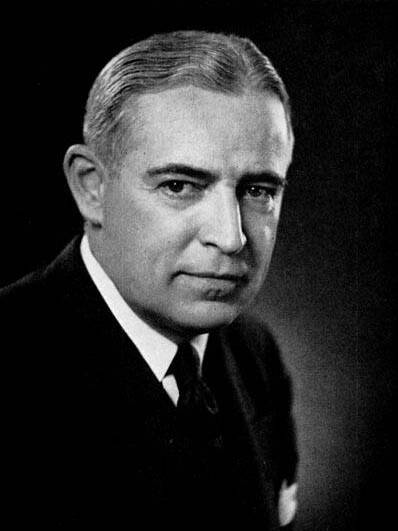
- Official portrait, circa 1945

Chair of the Interstate Commerce Commission
- In office 1955–1956

Member of the Interstate Commerce Commission
- In office 1950–1957
- Appointed by: Harry S. Truman

Lieutenant Governor of Illinois
- In office 1941–1949
- Governor: Dwight H. Green
- Preceded by: John Henry Stelle
- Succeeded by: Sherwood Dixon

Speaker of the Illinois House of Representatives
- In office 1939
- Preceded by: Louie E. Lewis
- Succeeded by: Elmer Jacob Schnackenberg

Member of the Illinois House of Representatives
- In office 1933–1941

Personal details
- Born: August 24, 1896 Jerseyville, Illinois, U.S.
- Died: October 15, 1972 (aged 76)
- Party: Republican
- Education: University of Illinois College of Law

Hugh Ware Cross (August 24, 1896 – October 15, 1972) was an American politician, lawyer, farmer, and businessman who served as chairman of the Interstate Commerce Commission, lieutenant governor of Illinois, and speaker of the Illinois House of Representatives.

== Early life ==
Born in Jerseyville, Illinois, Cross received his law degree from the University of Illinois College of Law. He practiced law in Jerseyville, Illinois, owned a farm, and was president of the Jersey County Abstract and Title Company.

== Illinois House of Representatives (1933–41) ==
Cross (a Republican) served in the Illinois House of Representatives from 1933 until 1941. He was speaker of the house in 1939.

== Lieutenant governor of Illinois (1941–49) ==
From 1941 until 1949, Cross served as lieutenant governor of Illinois. He was elected to the office in 1940, defeating Democratic nominee Louie E. Lewis. He was re-elected in 1944 The governor during Cross's tenure was fellow Republican Dwight H. Green, who had been elected in a separate coinciding elections in both 1940 and 1944.

Cross did not seek re-election in 1948, and left office in January 1949.

== Interstate Commerce Commission ==
In 1949, Cross was nominated by President Harry S. Truman to serve on the Interstate Commerce Commission (ICC). He was confirmed by the United States Senate on December 14, 1950 to a term expiring in 1957.

In mid-1955, Cross became chair of the commission (chairmanship rotated between commission members).

In 1955, the U.S. Senate's Permanent Subcommittee on Investigations investigated Cross for a possible conflict of interest matter. Possible impropriety was alleged in Cross' provision of testimony as a character witness for shipping magnate John Keeshin. Cross was accused of providing the testimony in exchange for a job offer from Keeshin, an allegation that Cross denied. While the matter he had testified in support of Keeshin on was intrastate (therefore not subject to ICC oversight), some senators nevertheless found it potentially untoward enough to investigate.

== Later career ==
Cross returned to his law practice and farm in Jerseyville, Illinois.

== Notes ==
Party political offices
Preceded by George Hatzenbuhler	Republican nominee for Lieutenant Governor of Illinois; 1940, 1944	Succeeded by Richard Yates Rowe
Political offices
Preceded by Vacant	Lieutenant Governor of Illinois; 1941–1949	Succeeded by Sherwood Dixon
