= Arnold P. Benson =

American politician

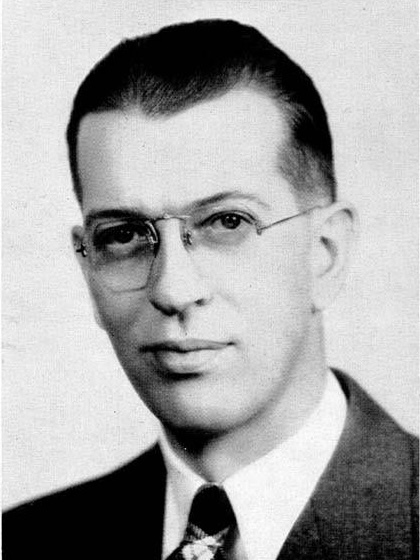
official portrait

Arnold P. Benson (1896-1974) was a Republican member of the Illinois Senate from 1933 to 1945.

== Biography ==
Arnold P. Benson was born March 5, 1896, in Batavia, Illinois to Swedish American immigrants. He was educated in Batavia public schools and at the Lewis Institute. He was a newspaper editor and the publisher of The Batavia Herald. He was first elected to the Illinois Senate in the 1932 election from the 14th district defeating Democratic candidate James Harrington Scott. The 14th district consisted of parts of Kane and Kendall counties. At the time of his election, he was serving his third term as member of the Board of Education of School District No. 101 at Batavia.

Benson served as president pro tempore of the Illinois Senate during the 61st and 62nd General Assembly. While in the position, he served as the acting Governor of Illinois.

In the 1944 election, Benson ran for Illinois Secretary of State. He defeated William G. Stratton for the Republican nomination, but lost in the general election to Illinois Auditor of Public Accounts and Democratic candidate Edward J. Barrett. After his loss, in 1945, he was appointed by Governor Dwight H. Green to serve as the Director of the Illinois Department of Agriculture. Benson died in 1974.
