= William G. Stratton Building =

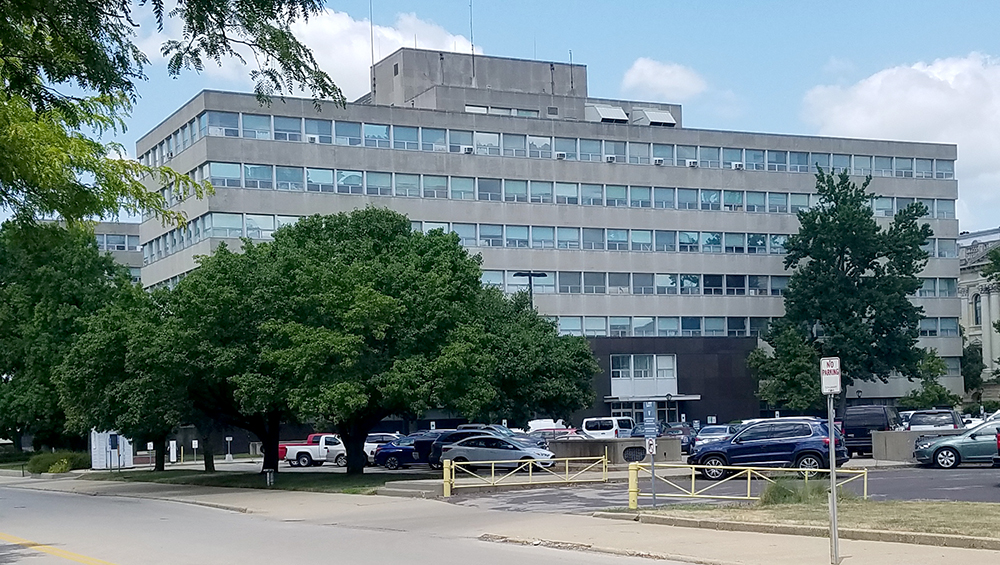
- Interactive map of the William G. Stratton Building area

General information
- Location: Springfield, Illinois, United States
- Coordinates: 39°47′54.4″N 89°39′23.8″W
- Construction started: February 1954; 72 years ago
- Completed: 1956; 70 years ago
- Client: Illinois state government

Technical details
- Floor count: 8
- Floor area: 446,429 square feet

Design and construction
- Architect: Louis H. Gerding

Other information
- Public transit: SMTD

Website
- http://oac.ilga.gov/buildings.asp?building=Stratton

The William G. Stratton Building, known more commonly on a local level as the Stratton Building, is an eight-story office building located on the grounds of the Illinois State Capitol in downtown Springfield, Illinois.

== History ==
Completed in 1956, the building is named after former Illinois politician William G. "Billy" Stratton, who served as the 32nd governor of Illinois from 1953 until 1961. The Stratton Building currently houses legislative offices of the Illinois House of Representatives and Illinois Senate, as well as other State of Illinois agency offices.

The building has been targeted for closure in the past, with former Governor Jim Edgar criticizing the building's architecture and a former state representative, now the Illinois Department of Natural Resources assistant director, Rich Brauer, calling the Stratton Building, "way beyond its time", and championing the construction of a new office building on the Capitol grounds. In May 2004, the Illinois House voted, 94–18, to close the Stratton Building, but the bill was not called for a vote in the Illinois Senate. The building is also often the subject of articles in the Springfield State Journal-Register about its lights being on nearly around the clock, despite the absence of employees working in the building. As recently as January 2017, representatives of the state have pointed out that the building's age and lack of wiring upgrades since it was constructed would be cost prohibitive on the state's budget to repair.
