= Arthur C. Lueder =

American politician

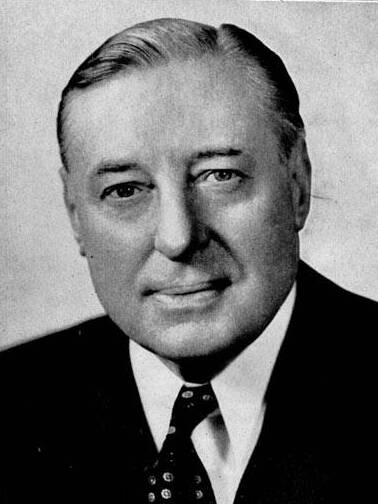
- Official portrait, circa 1945

Illinois Auditor of Public Accounts
- In office 1941–1949
- Preceded by: Edward J. Barrett
- Succeeded by: Benjamin O. Cooper

Postmaster of Chicago
- In office 1923–1933
- Appointed by: Warren G. Harding
- Preceded by: Grant B. Miller
- Succeeded by: Ernest J. Kruetgen
- In office 1921–1923
- Appointed by: Warren G. Harding
- Preceded by: William B. Carlile
- Succeeded by: Grant B. Miller

Personal details
- Born: March 12, 1876 Elmhurst, Illinois, U.S.
- Died: May 7, 1957 (aged 81) Lombard, Illinois, U.S.
- Resting place: Graceland Cemetery
- Party: Republican
- Education: Elmhurst College; University of Chicago Law School

Military service
- Allegiance: United States
- Branch/service: Army
- Battles/wars: Spanish–American War

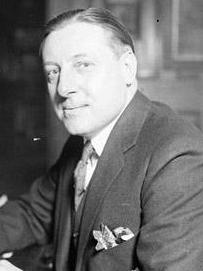
Lueder in 1923

Arthur Charles Lueder (March 12, 1876 – May 7, 1957) was an American lawyer businessman, and politician.

== Biography ==
Lueder's grave at Graceland Cemetery

Born in Elmhurst, Illinois, Lueder served in the United States Army during the Spanish–American War. He graduated from Elmhurst College and from the University of Chicago Law School. He was a lawyer and was in the real estate business. In the spring of 1923 he ran for Mayor of Chicago Republican Party ticket. He soon after ran for Illinois Secretary of State, again on the Republican ticket. He served as postmaster of Chicago from 1921 to 1933 except for a brief interval in 1923. From 1941 to 1949, Lueder served as Illinois Auditor of Public Accounts, having been elected in 1940 and 1944.

He died at his daughter's home in Lombard, Illinois after undergoing surgery. He was buried at Graceland Cemetery in Chicago.

== Notes ==
Party political offices
Preceded by Arthur J. Bidwill	Republican nominee for Illinois Auditor of Public Accounts; 1940, 1944	Succeeded by Sinon A. Murray
Political offices
Preceded by Edward J. Barrett	Illinois Auditor of Public Accounts; 1941–1949	Succeeded by Benjamin O. Cooper
Preceded by William B. Carlile	Postmaster of Chicago; 1921–1923	Succeeded by Grant B. Miller
Preceded by Grant B. Miller	Postmaster of Chicago; 1923–1933	Succeeded by Ernest J. Kruetgen
