= Christopher, Illinois =

Christopher
- City
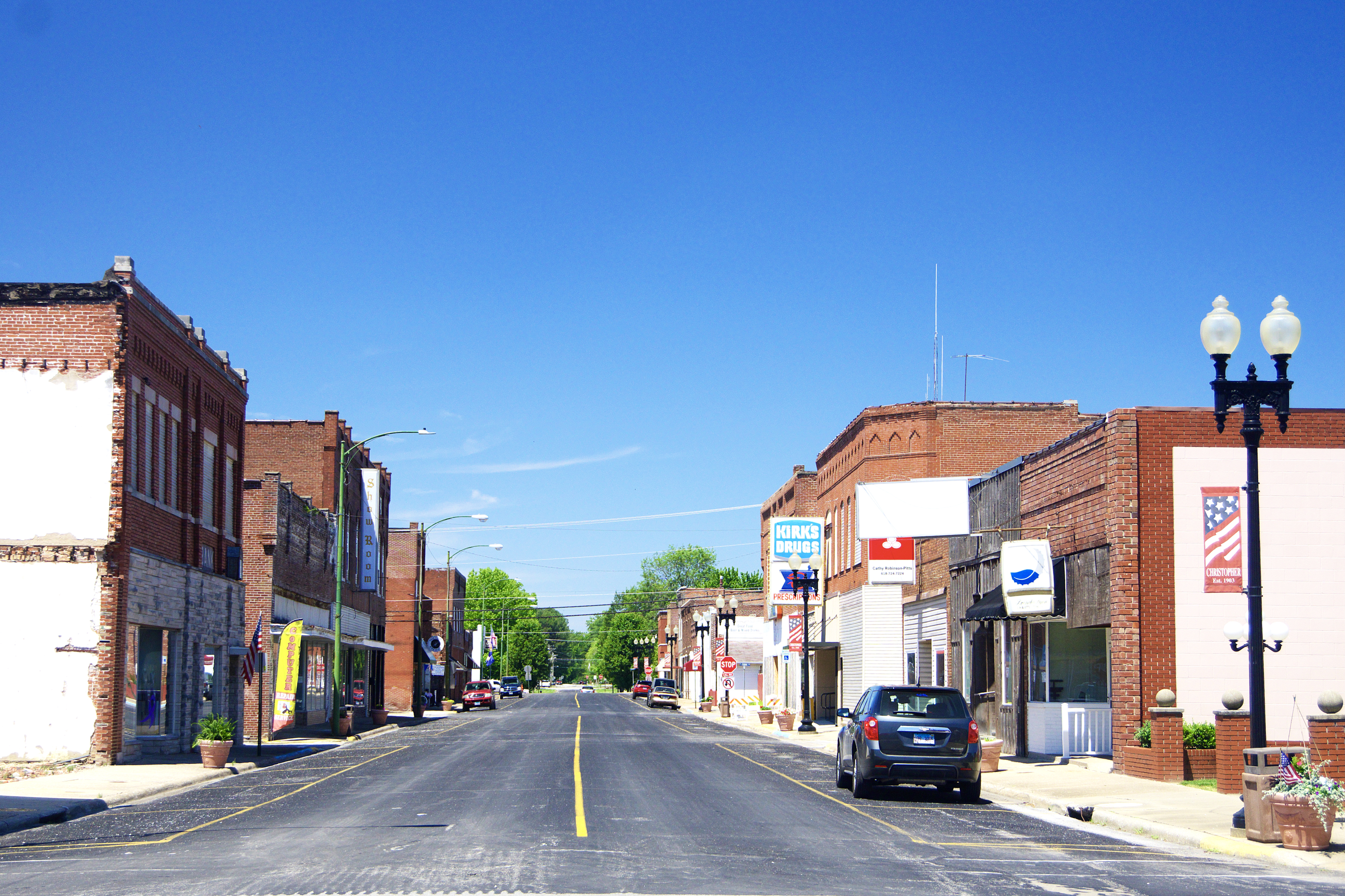
- Market Street

- Location of Christopher in Franklin County, Illinois.
- Coordinates: 37°58′15″N 89°03′11″W
- Country: United States
- State: Illinois
- County: Franklin

Area
  - Total: 1.64 sq mi (4.24 km^{2})
  - Land: 1.62 sq mi (4.20 km^{2})
  - Water: 0.015 sq mi (0.04 km^{2})
- Elevation: 436 ft (133 m)

Population (2020)
  - Total: 2,697
  - Density: 1,663.1/sq mi (642.13/km^{2})
- Time zone: UTC-6 (CST)
  - Summer (DST): UTC-5 (CDT)
- ZIP code: 62822
- Area code: 618
- FIPS code: 17-14286
- GNIS feature ID: 2393521
- Website: https://www.cityofchristopher.org/

Christopher is a city in Franklin County, Illinois, United States. The population was 2,697 at the time of the 2020 census.

== History ==
Christopher was founded in 1879 as a railroad stop, and named for Christopher Harrison, a grandson of prominent early settler Isham Harrison. A post office opened the following year. The community voted to become a village in 1903, and a city in 1910.

=== Coal mining ===
In 1906, the United Coal Mining Company No. 1 mine opened near Christopher. An explosion at the mine killed eight men on July 27, 1915. The mine was sold to the Old Ben Coal Corporation, and renamed Old Ben Coal Mine No. 1 in 1916. The mine closed in 1929.

On November 29, 1917, an explosion at Old Ben Coal Corporation's Mine No. 11 killed 17 men.

=== Mob vigilantism during World War I ===
On March 22, 1918, five men who were accused of being "pro-German" became victims of a mob numbering more than 300 people. They were:

- Theodore Kunger, a grocer, had been judged by a local court of being disloyal, and ordered to pay a $100 fine. Having no money, he was put in jail. Later his cell was broken into by a vigilance committee. Kunger was carried by the mob to the city square where he was made to kiss the U.S. flag before he was tarred and feathered. He was then returned to jail.
- W. R. Jones, Kunger's attorney, was abducted five miles outside Christopher on his way home to Benton, Illinois. He was brought to the square and compelled to kiss the flag and praise president Woodrow Wilson, but was spared tar and feathers. He was told to leave town.
- Henry Timbrock and Henry Wheeler were also suspected of pro-German sympathies. They too were taken to the square, made to kiss the flag and tarred and feathered.
- The Polish pastor of the local Catholic church, Rev. John Kovalsky, had been accused of making disloyal remarks. He was taken to the square where he was stripped to the waist and coated with tar and feathers.

== Geography ==
Christopher is located 20 miles northeast of Carbondale, Illinois.

According to the 2021 census gazetteer files, Christopher has a total area of 1.64 square miles (4.25 km^{2}), of which 1.62 square miles (4.20 km^{2}) (or 99.08%) is land and 0.02 square miles (0.05 km^{2}) (or 0.92%) is water.

== Demographics ==
Historical population
| Census | Pop. | Note | %± |
|---|---|---|---|
| 1910 | 1,825 | | — |
| 1920 | 3,830 | | 109.9% |
| 1930 | 4,244 | | 10.8% |
| 1940 | 3,833 | | −9.7% |
| 1950 | 3,545 | | −7.5% |
| 1960 | 2,854 | | −19.5% |
| 1970 | 2,910 | | 2.0% |
| 1980 | 3,086 | | 6.0% |
| 1990 | 2,774 | | −10.1% |
| 2000 | 2,836 | | 2.2% |
| 2010 | 2,382 | | −16.0% |
| 2020 | 2,697 | | 13.2% |
U.S. Decennial Census

=== 2020 census ===
As of the 2020 census, Christopher had a population of 2,697 and 616 families. The median age was 41.3 years. 22.6% of residents were under the age of 18 and 21.3% of residents were 65 years of age or older. For every 100 females there were 94.3 males, and for every 100 females age 18 and over there were 91.7 males age 18 and over.

0.0% of residents lived in urban areas, while 100.0% lived in rural areas.

There were 1,180 households in Christopher, of which 27.5% had children under the age of 18 living in them. Of all households, 39.3% were married-couple households, 20.4% were households with a male householder and no spouse or partner present, and 31.6% were households with a female householder and no spouse or partner present. About 36.4% of all households were made up of individuals and 18.5% had someone living alone who was 65 years of age or older.

The population density was 1,647.53 inhabitants per square mile (636.11/km^{2}). There were 1,351 housing units at an average density of 825.29 per square mile (318.65/km^{2}); 12.7% were vacant. The homeowner vacancy rate was 5.2% and the rental vacancy rate was 11.2%.

Racial composition as of the 2020 census
| Race | Number | Percent |
|---|---|---|
| White | 2,553 | 94.7% |
| Black or African American | 14 | 0.5% |
| American Indian and Alaska Native | 7 | 0.3% |
| Asian | 1 | 0.0% |
| Native Hawaiian and Other Pacific Islander | 0 | 0.0% |
| Some other race | 10 | 0.4% |
| Two or more races | 112 | 4.2% |
| Hispanic or Latino (of any race) | 25 | 0.9% |

=== Income and poverty ===
The median income for a household in the city was $33,184, and the median income for a family was $38,750. Males had a median income of $28,194 versus $17,475 for females. The per capita income for the city was $20,279. About 25.3% of families and 29.6% of the population were below the poverty line, including 35.0% of those under age 18 and 26.1% of those age 65 or over.

== Education ==
- Rend Lake College
- John A. Logan College
- Southern Illinois University Carbondale

== Notable people ==
- Doug Collins, former NBA player and coach
- Al Glossop, second baseman for various teams
- Louie E. Lewis, Illinois state treasurer and speaker of the Illinois House of Representatives
- John Malkovich, actor, producer, and director
- Gene Rayburn (1917–99), radio and television personality, host of the Match Game
