= George M. Maypole =

American politician

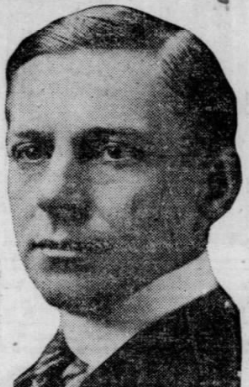
Maypole in 1919.

George M. Maypole (July 25, 1883 – January 19, 1956) was an American businessman and politician.

Born in Chicago, Illinois, Maypole went to the Chicago Public Schools. In 1905, he graduated from the University of Notre Dame with a degree in business administration. Maypole also went to Bryant and Stratton Business College, and Chicago-Kent College of Law. Maypole worked for many years with the Silver Springs Coal Creek, and was also involved with the Stutz Motor Car Company. He was part owner of the Chicago Bears football team with George Halas, and from 1917 to 1931, Maypole served on the Chicago City Council and was a Democrat. Then from 1931 to 1943, Maypole served in the Illinois State Senate and was president pro tempore of the senate. In 1940, he ran unsuccessfully in the Democratic primary for lieutenant governor of Illinois. In 1951, Maypole and his wife moved to Palm Springs, California. While living in Palm Springs, Maypole formed the first Democratic Party club. Maypole died at a hospital in Palm Springs, California.

== See also ==
- List of Chicago aldermen since 1923
