= Clay Freeman Gaumer =

American politician (1870–1952)

Clay Freeman Gaumer (March 14, 1870 – May 20, 1952) was a Prohibitionist member of the Illinois House of Representatives during the 44th and 45th Illinois General Assemblies.

A native of Alvin, Illinois, Gaumer was born March 14, 1870. He was first elected to the Illinois House of Representatives in 1904. Gaumer was reelected in 1906. In 1907, he introduced a constitutional amendment to create a statewide ban on alcohol consumption. He lost reelection in 1908.

Gaumer would run for office on behalf of the Prohibition Party on a number of occasions after his time in the Illinois House of Representatives. He was the party's nominee for Illinois's at-large congressional district in 1934 general election; its nominee for Lieutenant Governor in 1920 general election and 1936 general election; its nominee for Illinois Treasurer in the 1938 general election, its gubernatorial nominee in the 1940 general election; its nominee for Illinois State Superintendent in the 1942 election; and in the 1944 general election as one of its nominees for a seat on the University of Illinois Board of Trustees. He also attempted to get on the ballot as the party's nominee for United States Senate in the 1932 general election. Gaumer died May 20, 1952, in Danville, Illinois.
