= Louie E. Lewis =

American politician, newspaper editor, and farmer

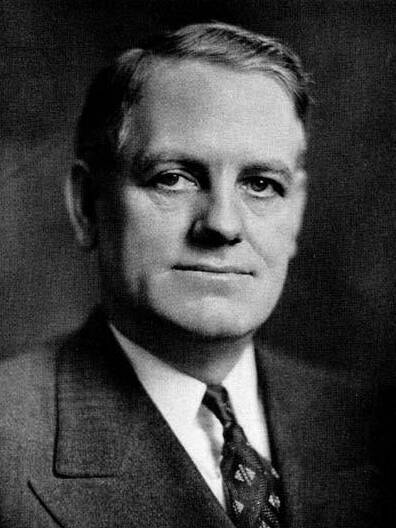
- official portrait, circa 1939
- Born: July 20, 1893; Christopher, Illinois, U.S.
- Died: September 8, 1968 (aged 75)

Louie Egan Lewis (July 20, 1893 – September 8, 1968) was an American politician, newspaper editor, and farmer.

Born on a farm in Christopher, Illinois, Lewis was a farmer, bookkeeper, and newspaper editor. He taught school and then owned the Sesser Herald and later the Christopher Progressive with his brother, Thurlow Girard Lewis. He was a Democrat. Lewis served on the Franklin County, Illinois board was president of the Sesser, Illinois School Board. Lewis then served in the Illinois House of Representatives from 1933 to 1939 and was Speaker of the House from 1937 to 1939. He then served as State Treasurer from 1939 to 1941. In 1940, he unsuccessfully ran as the Democratic nominee for lieutenant governor of Illinois. Lewis later worked for the Illinois Division of Motor Vehicles. He died of a heart attack in Christopher, Illinois.

== Notes ==
Party political offices
Preceded by John C. Martin	Democratic nominee for Treasurer of Illinois; 1938	Succeeded by Homer Mat Adams
Preceded by John Henry Stelle	Democratic nominee for Lieutenant Governor of Illinois; 1940	Succeeded by Edward C. Hunter
Political offices
Preceded by John C. Martin	Treasurer of Illinois; 1939–1941	Succeeded by Warren Wright
