= Warren Wright (politician) =

American politician

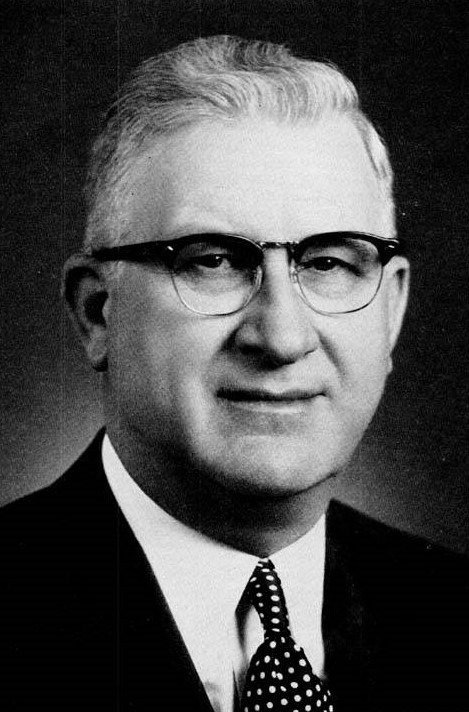
- Wright in 1956

Treasurer of Illinois
- In office January 10, 1955 – January 15, 1957
- Governor: William G. Stratton
- Preceded by: Elmer J. Hoffman
- Succeeded by: Elmer J. Hoffman
- In office January 13, 1941 – January 11, 1943
- Governor: Dwight H. Green
- Preceded by: Louie E. Lewis
- Succeeded by: William G. Stratton

Personal details
- Born: March 26, 1893; Murrayville, Illinois, U.S.
- Died: March 29, 1962 (aged 69); Park Ridge, Illinois, U.S.
- Political party: Republican

Warren E. Wright (March 26, 1893 – March 29, 1962) was an American politician and businessman.

Born in Murrayville, Illinois, Wright served in the United States Army during World War I. He owned an automobile dealership in Murrayville, Illinois and later in Jacksonville, Illinois. He was also in the hardware business. Wright was involved in the Republican Party. He served as Illinois state treasurer from 1941 to 1943 and from 1955 to 1957. Wright died of a heart attack at his home in Park Ridge, Illinois.

== Political career ==
Wright was a Republican.

In 1930, Wright ran unsuccessfully in the Republican primary for Illinois treasurer. In 1934, he ran unsuccessfully as the Republican nominee for Illinois's 20th congressional district. In 1936, he ran unsuccessfully in the Republican primary for one of Illinois' at-large congressional seats. In 1938, he again ran unsuccessfully in the Republican primary for Illinois treasurer.

In 1940, Wright ran a third time for Illinois treasurer. This time he was successful.

Rather than seek reelection as treasurer in 1942, he instead ran unsuccessfully in the Republican primary for United States Senate.

When Douglas MacArthur sought the Republican nomination for president in 1948, Wright campaigned actively for him and served as his national campaign coordinator.

In 1950, he sought to be treasurer again, but lost the Republican primary. In 1952, he ran unsuccessfully in the Republican primary for Illinois secretary of state.

In 1954, Wright was again elected Illinois treasurer.

Rather than seek reelection as treasurer in 1956, he instead ran unsuccessfully in the Republican primary for governor of Illinois.

In 1958, Wright sought to be treasurer again, but lost the general election.

In his final campaign for office, Wright ran in the 1960 Republican primary for United States Senate. After incumbent Republican governor William Stratton declined to endorse Wright in this race, Wright supported Democrat Otto Kerner, Jr. in the 1960 Illinois gubernatorial election. After his victory of Stratton, Kerner gave Wright a job as a state harness steward at the Maywood Park, which Wright held until before his death in 1962.

== Notes ==
Party political offices
Preceded by William R. McCauley	Republican nominee for Illinois Treasurer; 1940	Succeeded by William Stratton
Preceded by Elmer J. Hoffman	Republican nominee for Illinois Treasurer; 1954	Succeeded by Elmer J. Hoffman
Preceded by Elmer J. Hoffman	Republican nominee for Illinois Treasurer; 1958	Succeeded by William J. Scott
