= John C. Martin (politician) =

American politician

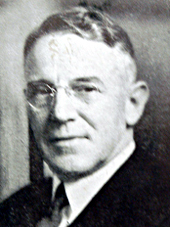

Member of the U.S. House of Representatives from Illinois's at-large district
- In office January 3, 1939 – January 3, 1941
- Preceded by: Edwin V. Champion
- Succeeded by: Stephen A. Day

47th and 49th Treasurer of Illinois
- In office January 11, 1937 – January 3, 1939
- Governor: Henry Horner
- Preceded by: John Henry Stelle
- Succeeded by: Louie E. Lewis
- In office January 9, 1933 – January 14, 1935
- Preceded by: Edward J. Barrett
- Succeeded by: John Henry Stelle

Personal details
- Born: John Cunningham Martin; April 29, 1880 Salem, Illinois, U.S.
- Died: January 27, 1952 (aged 71) Long Beach, California, U.S.
- Party: Democratic

John Cunningham Martin (April 29, 1880 in Salem, Illinois – January 27, 1952 in Long Beach, California) was an American politician who served as a member of the US House of Representatives from Illinois and as Illinois treasurer.

Martin attended the public schools and Illinois College in Jacksonville, Illinois. He started his career in banking in 1907 and went on to serve as a director of the Federal Reserve Bank of St Louis from 1922 to 1932. Martin also served as president of the Salem National Bank from 1933 to 1952 and then served as State Treasurer of Illinois from 1933 to 1935 and later from 1937 to 1939. He was also a member of the Illinois Tax Commission and served as the Commission's chairman from 1935 to 1936.

He also served as chairman of the Illinois Emergency Relief Commission 1935 to 1938. He won election as a Democrat to the 76th United States Congress (January 3, 1939 – January 3, 1941), but was not a candidate for renomination in 1940, choosing instead to resume his banking interests.

Martin was buried at East Lawn Cemetery, Salem, Illinois. He was the maternal grandfather of the 25th Governor of Oklahoma Frank Keating.

Party political offices
Preceded by Peter Bartzen	Democratic nominee for Treasurer of Illinois; 1926	Succeeded by Samuel L. Nelson
Preceded by Edward J. Barrett	Democratic nominee for Treasurer of Illinois; 1932	Succeeded by John Henry Stelle
Preceded by John Henry Stelle	Democratic nominee for Treasurer of Illinois; 1936	Succeeded by Louie E. Lewis
Preceded by Edward J. Barrett	Democratic nominee for Illinois Auditor of Public Accounts; 1940	Succeeded by William Vicars
Political offices
Preceded by Edward J. Barrett	Treasurer of Illinois; 1933–1935	Succeeded by John Henry Stelle
Preceded by John Henry Stelle	Treasurer of Illinois; 1937–1939	Succeeded by Louie E. Lewis
U.S. House of Representatives
Preceded by Edwin V. Champion	Member of the U.S. House of Representatives from Illinois's at-large congressional district 1939–1941	Succeeded by Stephen A. Day
