= Walter T. Gunn =

American judge

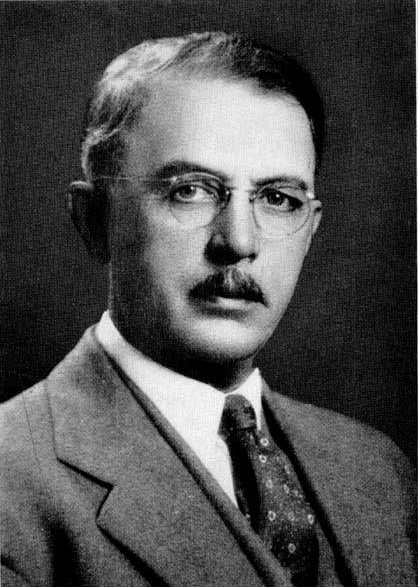
Gunn's official photograph, c. 1943.

Walter T. Gunn (June 4, 1879 – October 13, 1956) was an American jurist.

Born in LaSalle County, Illinois, Gunn moved with his parents to Vermillion County, Illinois in 1880. He went to high school in Hoopeston, Illinois and to Greer College in Hoopeston. Gunn studied law at Illinois Wesleyan University and was admitted to the Illinois bar in 1902. He practiced law in Danville, Illinois and served as an assistant state's attorney for Vermillion County, corporate counsel for the city of Danville, and was master in chancery for the United States District Court for Eastern Illinois. Gunn served on the Illinois Supreme Court from 1938 until his retirement in 1951. Gunn died in a hospital in Danville, Illinois.
