= William Stratton =

Governor of Illinois from 1953 to 1961

William G. Stratton
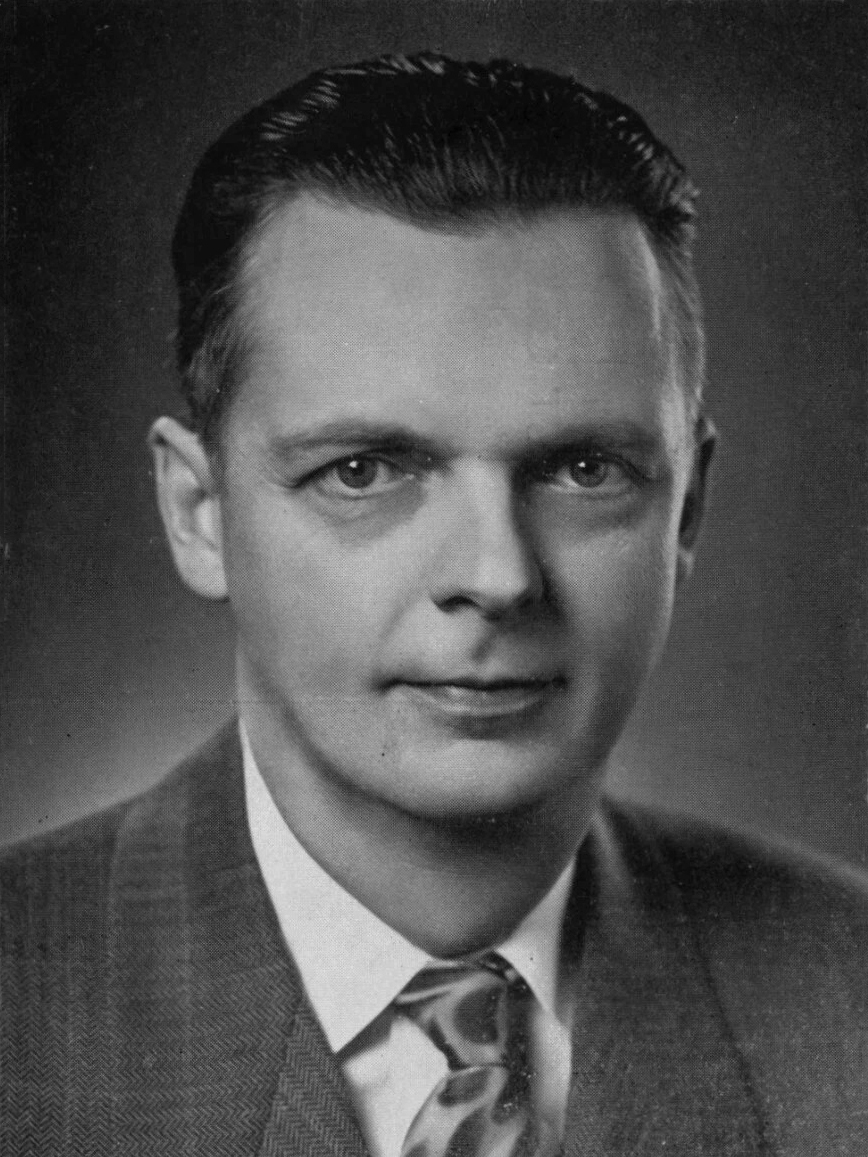
- Official portrait, c. 1952

32nd Governor of Illinois
- In office January 12, 1953 – January 9, 1961
- Lieutenant: John William Chapman
- Preceded by: Adlai Stevenson
- Succeeded by: Otto Kerner Jr.

Chair of the National Governors Association
- In office June 23, 1957 – May 18, 1958
- Preceded by: Thomas B. Stanley
- Succeeded by: LeRoy Collins

52nd & 56th Treasurer of Illinois
- In office January 8, 1951 – January 12, 1953
- Governor: Adlai Stevenson
- Preceded by: Ora Smith
- Succeeded by: Elmer J. Hoffman
- In office January 11, 1943 – January 8, 1945
- Governor: Dwight H. Green
- Preceded by: Warren Wright
- Succeeded by: Conrad F. Becker

Member of the U.S. House of Representatives from Illinois's at-large district
- In office January 3, 1947 – January 3, 1949
- Preceded by: Emily Taft Douglas
- Succeeded by: constituency abolished
- In office January 3, 1941 – January 3, 1943
- Preceded by: John Martin; Thomas Smith
- Succeeded by: Stephen A. Day

Personal details
- Born: February 26, 1914 Ingleside, Illinois, U.S.
- Died: March 2, 2001 (aged 87) Chicago, Illinois, U.S.
- Resting place: Rosehill Cemetery
- Party: Republican
- Spouse: Shirley Stratton
- Education: University of Arizona (BA)
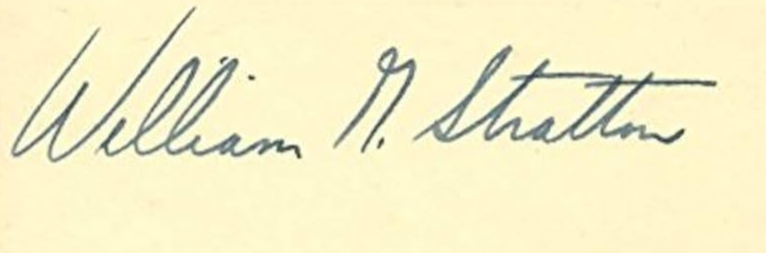
- Signature

Military service
- Allegiance: United States
- Branch/service: United States Navy
- Years of service: 1945–1946
- Rank: Lieutenant
- Battles/wars: World War II

William Grant Stratton (February 26, 1914 – March 2, 2001) was an American politician who served as the 32nd governor of Illinois from 1953 to 1961.

== Early life and career ==
Born February 26, 1914, in Ingleside, Lake County, Illinois, the son of William J. Stratton, an Illinois politician and former Secretary of State, and Zula Van Wormer Stratton, he served two non-consecutive terms as an at-large representative from Illinois after he was elected in 1940 and 1946. He was elected State Treasurer in 1942 and 1950.

Mr. Stratton was educated in the public schools of Lake County, Illinois and graduated from the University of Arizona in 1934 with a degree in Political Science. In 1953, he received the annual alumni award from his alma mater. He holds honorary degrees from the University of Arizona, Bradley University, Lincoln Memorial University, Elmhurst, North Central and Shurtlell Colleges and John Marshall Law School.

He was first elected to the United States Congress from the state at-large in 1940. At 26, he was the youngest member of the 77th Congress. Following this two year term, he was elected State Treasurer. In 1944 he volunteered for service in the U.S. Navy and served in the Pacific Theatre of Operations in World War II. He joined the U.S. Navy, where he served as a lieutenant from 1944 to 1946.

Returning to civilian life in 1946, he was elected to the U.S. Congress from the state-at-large for a second time. While in Congress he served on the following committees; Banking and Currency, Flood Control, Civil Service and District of Columbia.

In 1950 he was elected State Treasurer for a second term. Mr. Stratton reduced substantially the cost of operating this office during his administration. Mr. Stratton was inaugurated as the 32nd Governor of Illinois on January 12, 1953. At 38, he was the youngest man to hold this office in 70 years. He was re-elected to a second term in 1956.

After his military service, Stratton returned to politics, serving as a delegate to the 1952, 1956, 1960 and 1976 Republican National Conventions.

He served on the Executive Committee of the Governors' Conference and in 1955 brought the annual meeting of the nation's governors to Illinois for the first time in history. In 1957, Governor Stratton was named chairman of the Governors' Conference, and served as president of the Council of State governments in 1958. In 1959, he was a member of the group of American Governors which visited Russia.

He was a candidate for Republican nomination for Vice President in 1960.

The Illinois governor has been instrumental in developing Governors' Conference programs in the fields of highway construction, traffic safety, and federal state governmental relations. President Eisenhower, in 1958, named Governor Stratton a member of the Lincoln Sesquicentennial commission and in 1959, Mr. Stratton was a delegate to the Republican National Convention, and in the latter year led the Illinois delegation as its chairman.

== Governor of Illinois ==
He won the Republican nomination for governor in 1952 and defeated Lieutenant Governor Sherwood Dixon to become the youngest governor in America at the time. Stratton was re-elected governor in 1956. in 1960, he ran for an unprecedented third consecutive term, but was defeated by Democrat Otto Kerner, Jr.

Stratton was acquitted on charges of tax evasion in 1965. In 1968, he ran in the Republican primary for Governor and was defeated by Richard B. Ogilvie. Stratton finished a distant third, with only about seven percent of the primary vote.

Mr. Stratton considered the construction of the first 200 miles of the Illinois tollway system as one of his biggest achievements, his wife, Shirley, said in a telephone interview.

During his tenure, state hospital reforms were instituted that included beds for inmates, a bond issue was approved that funded the state’s expressway system, the first woman was chosen in a cabinet level status, and an improved state sales tax was initiated and used in school programs. After running unsuccessfully for a third term, Stratton left office on January 9, 1961.

== Personal life ==
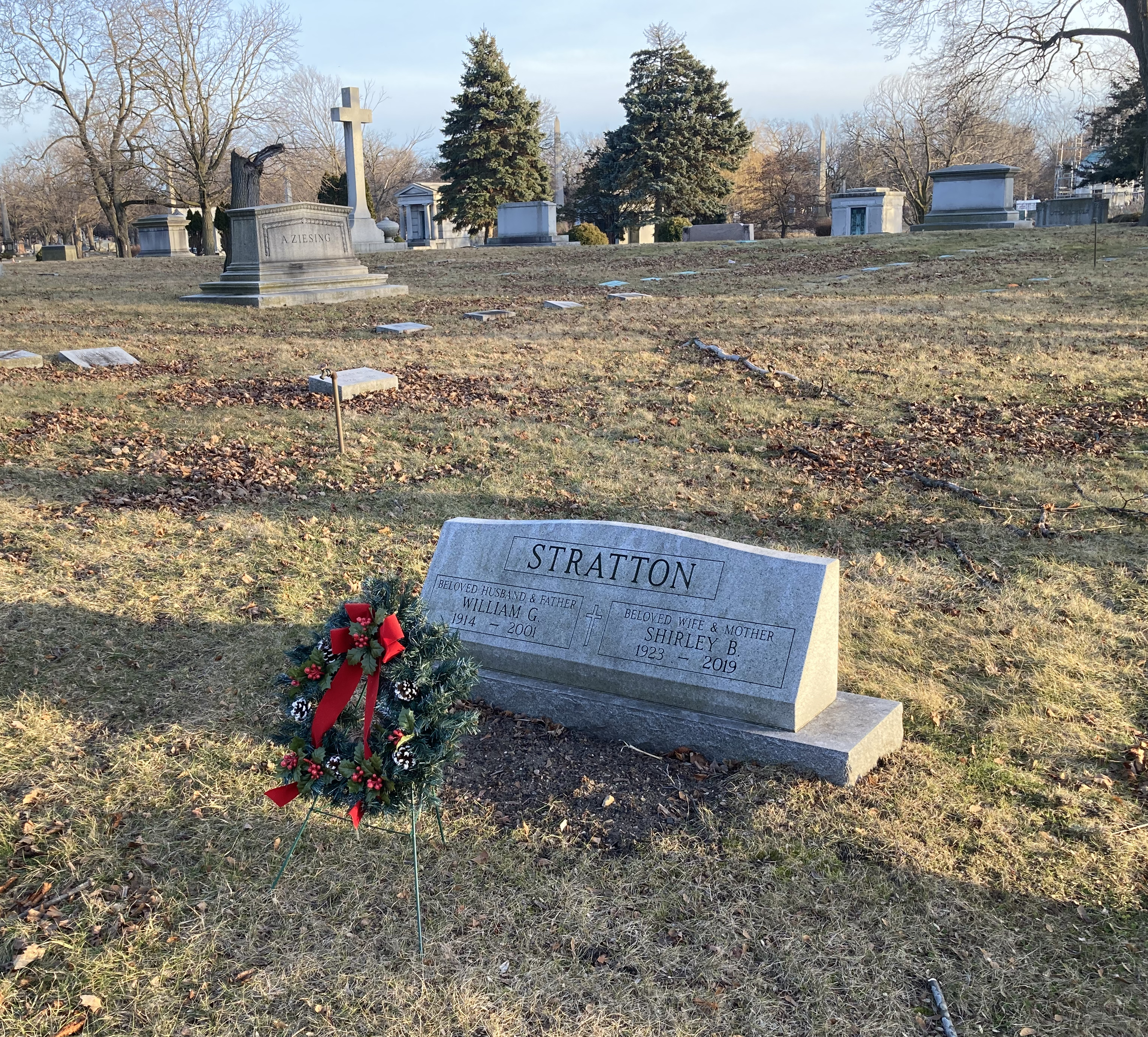
Stratton's grave at Rosehill Cemetery

In 1934, Stratton married Marion Hook. They had two children, Sandra (born 1936) and Diana (born 1939). Stratton and his wife spent most of their time apart because of his hectic political schedule, and Marion became dissatisfied with the marriage. Also, Marion despised the political arena and expressed distaste at her husband's relatively meager salary. Although Stratton did not want a divorce, his wife insisted that they end the marriage. He obtained a divorce from her on the grounds of desertion in 1949. Although Marion was granted custody of the children, they lived primarily with Stratton until 1952.

In 1950, Stratton married Shirley Breckenridge (1923–2019). They have a daughter, Nancy. His second marriage was a happier one, and Shirley actively campaigned for her husband. The two remained married until his death in 2001.

Stratton retired from politics after his failed 1968 gubernatorial race. Stratton died on March 2, 2001, and was buried at the Rosehill Cemetery in Chicago.

Stratton was interested in the work of a number of civic fraternal and veterans' organizations. He was a 33rd degree Mason, Member; Lions Club, Eastern Star, Shrine, Eagles, Elks, Moose, Illinois Athletic Club (Chicago) and Delta Chi fraternity. As a veteran, he was a member of the American Legion, Amvets and Veterans of Foreign Wars. Stratton was a member of the Methodist Church. While maintaining the family home in Morris, he operated a livestock farm in Sangamon County.

== Later life ==
In retirement, Stratton resided in Chicago. At the time of his death, he was a member of the Illinois Civil Service Commission.

He died at Northwestern Memorial Hospital in Chicago on March 2, 2001, at 87.

== Legacy ==
The following are named in his honor:

- Stratton Lock and Dam, on the Fox River, near McHenry, Illinois.
- William G. Stratton State Park, on the Illinois River, in Morris, Illinois.
- The William G. Stratton Building (formerly the State Office Building), in the Illinois State Capitol complex, which houses offices of many state legislators and other state agencies and was completed during his first term as governor.
- Stratton Quadrangle at Southern Illinois University Edwardsville in recognition of his position as governor at the time of the university's founding. He was also the speaker at its first commencement in 1960.

U.S. House of Representatives
Preceded by John Martin; Thomas Smith	Member of the U.S. House of Representatives from Illinois's at-large congressional district 1941–1943; Served alongside: Stephen A. Day	Succeeded by Stephen A. Day
Preceded by Emily Taft Douglas	Member of the U.S. House of Representatives from Illinois's at-large congressional district 1947–1949	Constituency abolished
Political offices
Preceded by Warren Wright	Treasurer of Illinois; 1943–1945	Succeeded by Conrad F. Becker
Preceded by Ora Smith	Treasurer of Illinois; 1951–1953	Succeeded by Elmer J. Hoffman
Preceded by Adlai Stevenson II	Governor of Illinois; 1953–1961	Succeeded by Otto Kerner Jr.
Preceded by Thomas B. Stanley	Chair of the National Governors Association; 1957–1958	Succeeded by LeRoy Collins
Party political offices
Preceded by Warren Wright	Republican nominee for Illinois Treasurer; 1942	Succeeded by Conrad F. Becker
Preceded by Arnold P. Benson	Republican nominee for Secretary of State of Illinois; 1948	Succeeded by Charles F. Carpentier
Preceded by Elmer Droste	Republican nominee for Illinois Treasurer; 1950	Succeeded by Elmer J. Hoffman
Preceded by Dwight H. Green	Republican nominee for Governor of Illinois; 1952, 1956, 1960	Succeeded by Charles H. Percy
