= John Henry Stelle =

American politician

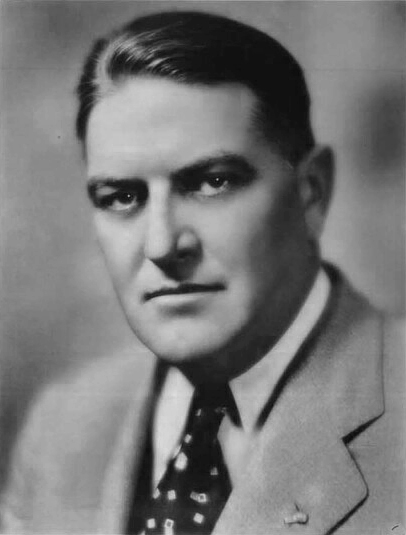
- Official portrait c. 1937-1938

National Commander of the American Legion
- In office 1945–1946
- Preceded by: Edward N. Scheiberling
- Succeeded by: Paul H. Griffith

29th Governor of Illinois
- In office October 6, 1940 – January 13, 1941
- Lieutenant: Vacant
- Preceded by: Henry Horner
- Succeeded by: Dwight H. Green

34th Lieutenant Governor of Illinois
- In office January 4, 1937 – October 6, 1940
- Governor: Henry Horner
- Preceded by: Thomas Donovan
- Succeeded by: Hugh W. Cross

48th Treasurer of Illinois
- In office 1935 – 1937
- Preceded by: John C. Martin
- Succeeded by: John C. Martin

Personal details
- Born: August 10, 1891 McLeansboro, Illinois, U.S.
- Died: July 5, 1962 (aged 70) St. Louis, Missouri, U.S.
- Party: Democratic
- Education: Western Military Academy; Washington University
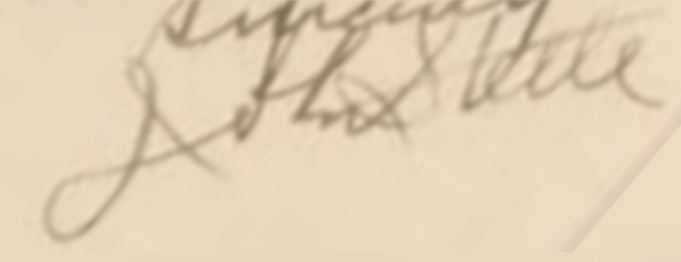
- Signature

Military service
- Allegiance: United States
- Branch/service: United States Army
- Unit: Illinois National Guard
- Battles/wars: World War I

John Henry Stelle (August 10, 1891 – July 5, 1962) was an American politician who served as the national commander of the American Legion from 1945 to 1946. He previously served as the 29th governor of Illinois (1940–1941), the 34th lieutenant governor of Illinois (1937–1940), and the treasurer of Illinois (1935–1937). He was also the chairman of the American Legion Executive Committee that, in six short months, drafted what would become known as the G.I. Bill of Rights and be known during the remainder of his life and in the years since as "The Father of the G.I. Bill".

== Early life, education, and prewar career ==
Born in McLeansboro, Illinois, Stelle graduated from McLeansboro Township High School, where he played baseball and football. After graduating, Stelle began a career as a professional baseball player. He played for teams in the KITTY (Kentucky-Illinois-Tennessee League) and, briefly, with the Decatur Commodores of the Illinois–Indiana–Iowa League (Three-I League) in the 1912 season. Stelle ended his baseball career after the 1913 season. But he would maintain his love of baseball throughout his life and would later be an owner of the St. Louis Browns baseball team. He briefly pursued the purchase of the New York Yankees while serving as Governor of Illinois. Stelle attended Western Military Academy in Alton, Illinois. He also attended the law school at Washington University in St. Louis during the 1914-1915 school year as a special student, after which he returned to McLeansboro, where he read the law under Johnson H. Lane, a prominent local attorney. He was admitted to the Illinois bar on October 16, 1916.

== Service in World War I ==
Stelle enlisted in the U.S. Army on April 17, 1917, eleven days after war was declared. He was wounded at Baccarat, France, while serving with the 77th Infantry Division, and evacuated to an Army hospital in Paris. Stelle recovered from his wounds and returned to serve with 28th and 30th Infantry Divisions in northern France in a series of major battles, including Mount Kemmel, the Somme, and Marne. Stelle rose to the rank of captain during the war and was serving as the commander of Company B of the 315th Machine Gun Battalion (30th Infantry Division) when hostilities ended. Stelle arrived back in the United States with his unit on March 22, 1919, and soon thereafter settled in McLeansboro, where he would maintain a home for the remainder of his life.

== Political career ==
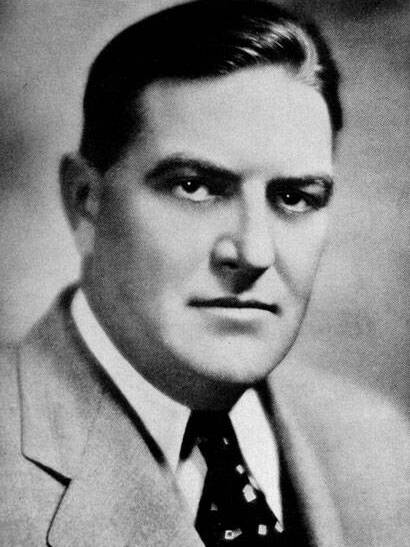
Official portrait of Stelle, 1933

Stelle was a lifelong Democrat although he noticeably split from the party in supporting Everett Dirksen, a Republican, in his run for the Senate in 1950 against the incumbent, Scott Lucas, and Dwight Eisenhower in his two presidential campaigns against a former Illinois governor, Adlai Stevenson. He served as a delegate to most of the Democratic National Conventions from 1928 to 1960. In 1928, Stelle was one of the organizers of the Illinois Democratic Service Men's Organization, a group designed to unify members of the Democratic Party who were veterans. The Service Men's Organization soon became politically active in the successful 1930 senatorial campaign of James Hamilton Lewis. That race introduced Stelle to many Chicago Democrats, including a young up-and-coming politician, Edward J. Barrett. Barrett and Stelle would remain close friends for the rest of their lives. In the 1930 election, Barrett ran for Illinois state treasurer and Stelle's Service Men's Organization actively supported him. Barrett won his election and, in 1931, appointed Stelle assistant state treasurer. Stelle and his family then moved to Springfield, where they would remain until 1941. Stelle's first elected statewide office was as state treasurer from 1935 to 1937. He ran for, and was elected, lieutenant governor in 1936, keeping that job until Horner's death almost four years later. Stelle and Horner, in 1936, ran separately but served together. But, despite both being Democrats, they frequently disagreed publicly on issues of the day. Stelle succeeded Horner after Horner's unexpected death on Sunday, October 6, 1940. As Horner's 99-day successor, Stelle served the second-shortest period in office in Illinois gubernatorial history.

Stelle's tenure as lieutenant governor was tumultuous. Horner was ill during most of his second term. He was often out of the public eye after his 1936 re-election. The governor spent significant time in Miami recuperating from what was reported to be a heart condition. During his absences from Illinois, Stelle would serve as the acting governor. In the last year or more of his term, Horner spend much of his time in Springfield in bed, on the second floor of the governor's mansion. With the governor in an impaired condition, corruption ran unchecked. The affairs of the state were managed by a "Bedside Cabinet" of Horner lieutenants. A "2% Club" developed whereby the Democratic Party assessed a two percent charge on the checks of state payrollers. Stelle became openly hostile to the Bedside Cabinet, the 2% Club, and the other abuses and corruption of the Horner administration.

When the Democratic Party slated its candidates for the 1940 election, and knowing that Horner would not be able to run again, Stelle was offered another run as lieutenant governor. He made it very clear publicly that he would run for governor or not run at all. After being denied the governor slot on the Democratic ticket, Stelle, Barrett, and Benjamin Adamowski, another Chicago politician, split with the Horner and Chicago's Kelly-Nash Machine and launched a maverick campaign in the 1940 Democratic primary. They all lost their races (Stelle ran for governor in the primary) but the result was that the Democratic Party in Illinois was split in the 1940 and 1944 statewide elections and Republicans swept every statewide office in both. Stelle's split with the Kelly-Nash Machine in 1940 effectively ended it as a power broker in Illinois statewide politics. Stelle was a powerful downstate politician and, with his Democratic Service Men's Organization, his prominence in the American Legion, and his solid political support in the downstate counties, he could exert a powerful influence on statewide election results. Stelle, despite numerous efforts to draft him to run for office after his 1940 primary defeat (he was touted as a candidate for both the United States House of Representatives and the Senate in the years after he left office), never again served in either an elective or appointed office in Illinois. During World War II, Stelle would utilize his political skills, as well as his prominence in the Legion, to usher the G.I. Bill of Rights through Congress and to President Roosevelt's desk on June 22, 1944.

== Governor of Illinois (1940–1941) ==
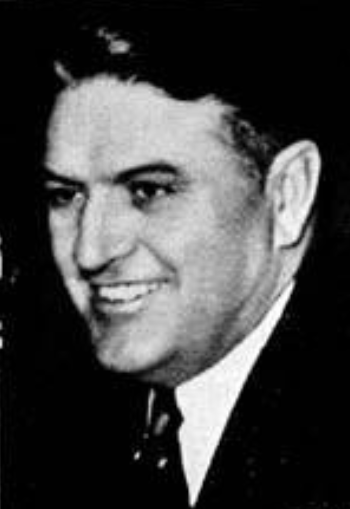
Stelle, circa his governorship

Stelle, upon losing his Democratic primary race for governor, moved his family back to McLeansboro in August 1940. He had a farm in Hamilton County and was busy that fall drilling wheat. In October 1940, when he heard Horner's health had taken a turn for the worse, he naturally assumed Horner would rally and recover has he had so many times before during his second term. But Horner did not; he died on Sunday, October 6, 1940. Stelle deferred moving his family back to Springfield and the governor's mansion until well after Horner's funeral. The governor's mansion had devolved during Horner's long absences and the periods during which he was bedridden into a "club" with political cronies using it day and night as a respite; drinking and cigar smoking occurred on a daily basis on the first floor of the mansion while Horner was bedridden in the governor's quarters upstairs. As a result, the mansion's staff often complained of the increased demands being placed on them. The mansion as a result of years of abuse, which accelerated during Horner's terms, fell into disrepair and was, by Horner's death, badly in need of redecorating. As one of Stelle's sons, Russell (who lived in the governor's mansion with his parents) later recalled, "it was a dump." Stelle directed the rooms housing the Lincoln Library be redecorated. Many nights during Stelle's ninety-nine-day tenure, which spanned the holiday season in 1940, the mansion was "lit up like a Christmas tree," as thirty to forty guests were often entertained at one time, a number of them friends from Southern Illinois and Springfield. Horner, a bachelor, had rarely entertained at the mansion during his eight year tenancy - especially so during his second term - so the change Stelle and his family brought was a welcome one in Springfield. The new governor's social agenda at the mansion involved no overspending as the entertainment budget had scarcely been touched during Horner's long illness and his repeated absences from Springfield. Notwithstanding his new quarters, Stelle continued his practice, developed over his many years of owning and managing a farm, of rising early every morning, He would typically have breakfast in the company of the mansion's staff.

Eight days after Horner's death, Stelle declared an end to Horner's 2% Club. He also make it clear that Horner's Bedside Cabinet would no longer manage the state. But he did not fire all of the members of the Bedside Cabinet; several remained state employees until the end of Stelle's term. Stelle made changes to some state directorships but his appointments were generally completed within a month of Horner's death; the state had an election coming up on November 5, 1940, and mass firings of state workers would have been a distraction. Horner had appointed thousands of individuals during his eight years in office. Most of those appointees were going to be terminated at the end of Stelle's term (the Republican Party swept all the statewide offices in 1940 including the governorship and had its own appointments to make). While Stelle replaced some department heads within the government, his changes were modest, especially compared to the thousands appointed by Horner. There is no empirical evidence that Stelle's appointments involved more than a couple of hundred individuals out of a total state payroll at the time of more than almost 25,000. As Governor, Stelle had the prerogative to appoint men and women loyal to him, even if the appointments were likely to be only for the remainder of his short term.

Stelle appointed George Edward Day, a close friend, state purchasing agent. Day, a paint dealer from Springfield, was uniquely suited to address a particular obsession of the new governor's: the painting of yellow lines on highways to indicate no passing zones. Day bought vast quantities of yellow paint from a company in Springfield he owned, on a no-bid basis, and the traffic safety measure was instituted. But the appointment of Day and the purchase of the yellow paint were perhaps the most controversial decisions of Stelle's short term. Stelle ignored the criticism by famously saying he did not care what the press said about him as long as they spelled his name correctly. Illinois thus became the first state in the nation to mark no passing zones on its public thoroughfares (Minnesota was the first to stripe the centerline of the highway but did not designate no passing zones). The decision by Stelle to institute a program of marking highways and designating no passing zones no doubt saved thousands of lives over the years to follow. Furthermore, the purchase of a large quantity of yellow paint proved to be a windfall for the state: during World War II, states were emulating Stelle's highway innovation and yellow paint was both in short supply and expensive. Illinois had a surplus of yellow paint left over from Stelle's term which it then sold to other states at an unintended profit. Stelle had the mansion repainted as well, at a cost of $1,900 (approximately $33,770 in current dollars). The governor's mansion had deteriorated during Horner's terms and repainting it was long overdue. But Stelle's decision to undertake a modest redecorating of the governor's mansion was attacked by his critics as a needless expense for a governor whose term was going to end in less than a hundred days. After his ninety-nine day term was over, Stelle handed the reins of state government over to his successor, Dwight H. Green, a Republican. Stelle would never serve in a government position in Illinois again.

Stelle denounced appeasement as American involvement in World War II drew closer. With the Illinois National Guard mobilized for federal service, the governor established a reserve militia in its place. He based his plan on a novel interpretation of a statute enacted in 1917, at the outset of World War I. Stelle's plan was for the militia to be available to the governor in the event of an emergency; with the Illinois National Guard mobilized, and able bodied men being drafted, the state had no military establishment to respond to crisis. An emergency defense council was put into place, draft boards were appointed, and hundreds of honorary commissions handed out, mostly to veterans who had served previously. Stelle's militia would prove invaluable during World War II in filling the void left by the departure of thousands of Guardsmen and civilians to the military.

== Portraits ==
Stelle's portrait may be found in the Hall of Governors on the second floor of the Illinois State Capitol in Springfield, Illinois. Since Stelle was elected lieutenant governor and served until Horner's death, his portrait also hangs in Room 409 of the State Capitol with those of other lieutenant governors. Stelle is one of the few Illinois politicians to have two portraits in the state capitol for having served as both the governor and lieutenant governor of the state. Stelle's portraits were controversial when they were painted. The governor's portrait was the work of a Chicago painter, Leonard Seyffert. Seyffert charged the State $1,000 for the painting, an enormous sum in 1940. Stelle had to approve the painting which he ultimately did after some hesitation. Then the painting was lost for several years. It was found in 1944, four years after Stelle left office, in a closet in the state capitol and was hung later that year. Stelle's lieutenant governor portrait, which was half the size of his governor's portrait, cost $500, a large sum at the time. Stelle rejected it out of hand and a second portrait was then commissioned and painted. The second portrait is the one which now hangs on the fourth floor of the state capitol; it cost the state $850 and was immediately the subject of statewide criticism because of what was perceived to be an extravagant expense. Approval of the bill submitted by the artist for Stelle's portrait was delayed in the Republican legislature with the result that Stelle's lieutenant governor portrait was not hung until 1947, seven years after he left office. Stelle thus had three portraits painted at state expense, two of which are hanging today in the state capitol.

== Father of the G.I. Bill of Rights ==
Stelle's fervent devotion to the military and the men and women serving during World War II was genuine. Both his sons were officers in the Army during World War II and participated in the D-Day invasion. One of Stelle's sons, John Albert Stelle, was seriously wounded at Saint Lo a few days after participating in the invasion. John Albert, a Captain in the Infantry who served in both North Africa and Europe, wrote his parents often. In one of his letters prior to D-Day, he wrote, in referring to the hopes and aspirations of the men in his company: "All they want is an opportunity from their government to make good when they return..an opportunity to get an education or training and to find work." The letters from John Albert proved to be the genesis of what would become the Servicemen's Readjustment Act of 1944. Stelle became motivated to campaign for benefits for the millions of returning veterans after World War II through his involvement in the American Legion. Stelle had been active member of the Legion since its formative St. Louis Caucus in May 1919, Through the Legion and the Democratic Service Men's Organization, he maintained a close relationship with veterans not just in Illinois but throughout the United States. Following his return to the private sector in 1941, Stelle's involvement in the American Legion led to his being appointed chairman of its G.I. Bill Executive Committee. Stelle was an ideal choice for the role as chairman. He was a former Democratic Governor of one of the largest states in the country. Control of both houses of Congress and the Presidency were held by Democrats. Stelle had attended numerous Democratic National Conventions during his political career and was on a first name basis with most of the prominent Democrats in the federal government. He gave the committee credibility with the Washington establishment. As chairman, he oversaw the drafting and ultimate passage of the Servicemen's Readjustment Act of 1944, better known as the G.I. Bill of Rights, including its steerage through Congress to the President's desk. His success in that effort through the Legion was rewarded after the war. In 1945, Stelle was elected National Commander of the American Legion, the organization's top post, in recognition of his role in getting the G.I. Bill enacted. In that role, he would oversee the implementation of the G.I. Bill as the veterans returned home after World War II.

He soon became known as "The Father of the G.I. Bill", and that term stuck for the rest of his life. In 2004, the Education Commission of the States awarded Stelle its James Bryant Conant Award posthumously. The Award, which the commission awards annually, is given for outstanding service to education. According to his citation: "Stelle, a World War I veteran and past national commander of The American Legion, quarterbacked a team of Legion officials that, in the space of just six months, designed and put forth the main features of the GI Bill, organized massive public support and shepherded its successful passage through Congress. Stelle's leadership and behind-the-scenes negotiating skills are widely credited for the legislation's surviving stubborn pockets of resistance, intense debate and a conference committee deadlock that nearly scuttled the bill at the 11th hour." His role in getting the G.I. Bill formulated and passed was Stelle's greatest political achievement and gave him a national prominence. He managed, during the course of a year in Washington D.C., to get drafted and passed what one Senator has called "the best single investment the federal government has ever made."

== American Legion ==
Stelle attended the St. Louis Caucus in early May, 1919, at which hundreds of veterans of World War I established the American Legion; he would remain active in the Legion until his death in 1962. Stelle was unanimously elected as National Commander of the American Legion at the organization's National Convention in Chicago on November 18, 1945. World War II had just ended and veterans were returning home in mass. The election of Stelle was a recognition of his role in making the G.I. Bill a reality. The position of National Commander is largely ceremonial but Stelle used his term as a platform to advocate for a quick implementation of the G.I. Bill's programs. Truman had appointed Omar Bradley as the first head of the Veteran's Administration, the agency charged with administering all the veteran's programs and benefits. Stelle, never one to back down from a fight, openly criticized Bradley, a national hero and former five star general, for VA's slow implementation of the G.I. Bill's programs. He was especially critical of the VA's treatment of injured and handicapped veterans in its hospitals. The sparing between Stelle and Bradley continued for several months and generated national headlines. Some legionnaires even suggested ending Stelle's term at National Commander early. The two men met in Washington, D.C. on February 27, 1946, and appeared to agree on a truce while the VA mobilized its healthcare resources for veterans. But the accord was fragile and Stelle, as his one-year term neared its end later that year, began criticizing Bradley publicly again for his poor administration of the agency. Bradley would last another year as head of the VA but would leave the agency in November 1947 to become Chief of Staff of the Army and Stelle would serve out the remainder of his term as National Commander. But veterans throughout the United States appreciated having an advocate for their benefits under the G.I. Bill and the episode, while certainly controversial, elevated Stelle's national profile.

== Later life ==
Stelle was entrepreneurial his entire life. In the 1920s, he purchased the Haw Creek Creamery in McLeansboro. He also owned a farm a few miles east of McLeansboro where he raised thoroughbred race horses and maintained a sizable dairy herd. Milk from the farm was sold at his creamery and elsewhere in southern Illinois. The Stelle Farm, as it would be called during his lifetime, was one of Stelle's passions and, by the late-1940s had grown in size to more than a thousand acres. More than a hundred horses were housed at the Stelle Farm at the time of his death.

Stelle also acquired Shale Products Company in McLeansboro prior to entering statewide politics in the 1930s. The company introduced him to the production of tile products (Shale Products produced a line of hollow tile used for drainage applications) which he leveraged, between 1934 and 1936, into ownership of Clay Products in Brazil, Indiana. He would soon change the name of that enterprise to Arketex Ceramic Corporation. Arketex manufactured structural glazed tile which it sold throughout the United States and Canada. By the time of his death in 1962, Stelle had grown Arketex to more than a thousand employees working in four plants in the Brazil area.

Stelle was an early supporter of, and participant in, the oil boom which southern Illinois (known as "Little Egypt") experienced during the 1930s. He often clashed with Horner on the regulation of the state's nascent oil industry. Stelle acquired mineral rights in the oil rich areas of southeastern Illinois and would remain active in oil drilling and production until his death. He drilled several wells on the Stelle Farm which were moderately successful.

Stelle organized an investor group and built Cahokia Downs Race Track in Alorton, Illinois, just east of St. Louis. Cahokia Downs opened in 1954 and offered night time racing (a unique innovation at the time) to the St. Louis area for many years after Stelle's death. Stelle served as the president of Cahokia Downs from its opening until his death. His myriad business interests made Stelle a wealthy man and, beginning in the years immediately following World War II, Stelle and his wife began spending winters at their Star Island estate in Miami Beach. They would return every spring to the Stelle Farm, which became a showcase of sorts in Little Egypt. Stelle was a rare politician who was able to transition successfully after his public life ended into a very successful, multi-faceted, business career.

== Stelle Farm ==
The Stelle home, on the Stelle Farm, one of the more notable buildings in Hamilton County. It was located a few miles east of McLeansboro. It caught fire and burned down in 2005 (under suspicious circumstances), destroying one of the last remnants of Stelle's life. The house had originally been built by General James Romulus Campbell, a veteran of the Spanish American War. General Campbell used the property to introduce Percheron horses to Hamilton County. Shortly after returning from France after the war, Stelle purchased the Campbell farm with the house he would own until his death in 1962. Stelle purchased the property in the 1920s, shortly after the death of General Campbell. He continued the breeding operations on the farm and soon expanded the house. Over the years, Stelle made numerous improvements and expansions of the house so that, by his death, it had six bedrooms, five bathrooms, and a sleeping porch which could accommodate eight people on four full-size beds. McLeansboro had limited accommodations for travelers during the years when the Stelles lived there with the result that the Stelle home often hosted visitors who stopped by to meet with Stelle. Many rich and famous personalities and politicians stopped by the Stelle Farm and stayed at the Stelle home during Stelle's lifetime. With its imposing columns and portico, the house had a magnificent "Tara-like" appearance and the Stelle Farm and home became a showcase in southern Illinois during the 1940s and 1950s. At the time of the fire in 2005, the house had been vacant for many years and was in poor condition. Another home occupied by Stelle, at 900 Washington Street in McLeansboro, remains standing in essentially the same state as it did during World War I when his wife, Wilma, and son, John Albert, lived there.

== Support of John F. Kennedy in 1960 ==
Stelle actively supported Dwight D. Eisenhower, a Republican, in the 1952 and 1956 Presidential elections. But he returned to the Democratic Party as the 1960 Presidential primaries approached. After being an early supporter of Missouri Senator Stuart Symington, Stelle threw his support to John F. Kennedy. Stelle, as a former governor and National Commander of the American Legion, still had significant political currency in Little Egypt. In October 1960, Stelle organized a fourteen stop "tour" for Kennedy which began in Belleville, southeast of St. Louis, and ended fifty miles southeast at Herrin four days later. Kennedy drew enormous crowds at each stop and credited Stelle with mobilizing support for him in southern Illinois. Stelle said his inspiration for the Kennedy tour was Truman's "whistle stop" campaign in 1948. Kennedy would later credit Stelle with his hair's breath (11,000 vote) win in Illinois, a pivotal state in 1960, which, in turn, made his narrow victory in the national election possible. During the summer of 1961, Kennedy hosted Stelle and his staff of volunteers to a week-long visit to Washington, D.C.. On August 1, 1961, the group, approximately twenty in number, visited Kennedy in the Oval Office. During the visit that day, Kennedy again expressed his gratitude to Stelle for his efforts in mobilizing the southern Illinois vote, a critical component in Kennedy's narrow victory in the state. The Illinois victory, in turn, allowed Kennedy to win a very close national election.

== Death ==
John Henry Stelle died on July 7, 1962, at Barnes Hospital, in St. Louis, shortly after he was diagnosed with acute leukemia. Upon his death, Stelle's body was taken back to McLeansboro for a funeral conducted by the Gholson Funeral Home. Gholson's quickly overflowed with the crowd, which numbered in the hundreds and included many dignitaries including the governor and lieutenant governor of the state. Gholson's counted over four hundred floral arrangements at Stelle's funeral, the most of any funeral in McLeansboro's history. Judge John Marshall Kames of East St. Louis delivered a lengthy eulogy which noted Stelle "was perhaps the best and most accomplished political organizer this state has known". Later in his eulogy, Kames summed up Stelle's life: "Farm boy to Governor, professional ball player, soldier, lawyer, treasurer of our state, Lieutenant Governor, big businessman, farmer, one of the organizers of and National Commander of the American Legion: that is the record of our departed friend to whose immediate memory we pay tribute and respect today." Stelle was laid to rest in McLeansboro's Odd Fellows Cemetery, a few miles east of Gholson's, under a magnificent oak and less than a mile from the Stelle Farm he loved so much. His wife, Wilma, survived him. She died on November 18, 1968, and was buried next to Stelle.

== James Bryant Conant Award ==
In 2004, more than forty years after his death, Stelle was awarded the James Bryant Conant Award from the Education Commission of the States in recognition of his pivotal role in getting the Servicemen's Readjustment Act of 1944 drafted and passed by Congress and signed by Roosevelt. In presenting the award, the commission recognized the G.I. Bill, as the act became known, "transformed the landscape of American higher education by offering veterans money to attend college." The award confirmed that, thanks to Stelle's efforts, the dream of receiving a college degree was no longer limited to members of the upper class. It also noted: "Stelle's leadership and behind-the-scenes negotiating skills are widely credited for the legislation's surviving stubborn pockets of resistance, intense debate and a conference committee deadlock that nearly scuttled the bill at the 11th hour." The award confirmed that Stelle had more than earned the title bestowed on him over the years after the passage of the act as "the Father of the G.I. Bill". The revolutionary enactment changed the American cultural landscape after World War II by creating a massive middle class that continues to this day.

== See also ==
- List of governors of Illinois
- List of members of the American Legion

Party political offices
Preceded by John C. Martin	Democratic nominee for Treasurer of Illinois; 1934	Succeeded by John C. Martin
Preceded by Thomas Donovan	Democratic nominee for Lieutenant Governor of Illinois; 1936	Succeeded by Louie E. Lewis
Political offices
Preceded by John C. Martin	Treasurer of Illinois; 1935–1937	Succeeded by John C. Martin
Preceded by Thomas Donovan	Lieutenant Governor of Illinois; 1937–1940	Succeeded by Hugh W. Cross
Preceded by Henry Horner	Governor of Illinois; 1940–1941	Succeeded by Dwight H. Green
Non-profit organization positions
Preceded by Edward N. Scheiberling	National Commander of The American Legion; 1945–1946	Succeeded by Paul H. Griffith
