= Henry Horner =

Governor of Illinois from 1933 to 1940

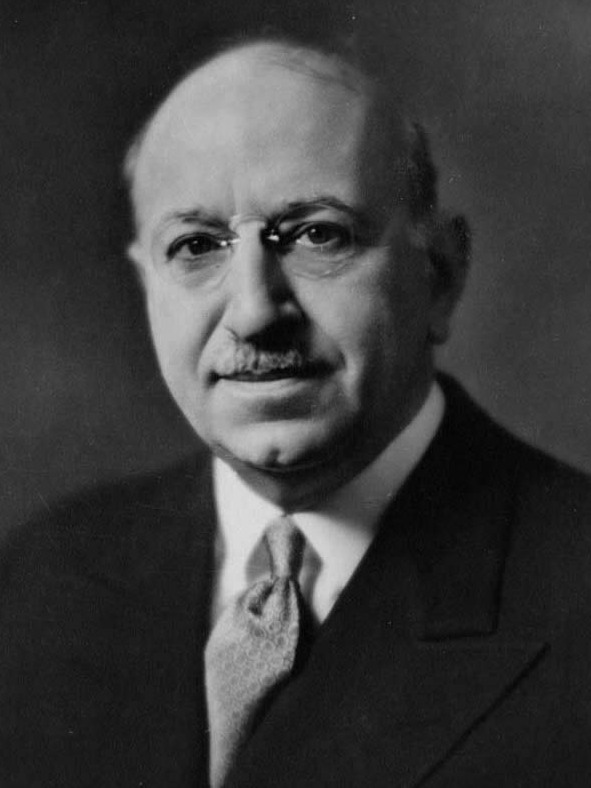
- Official Portrait c. 1934

28th Governor of Illinois
- In office January 9, 1933 – October 6, 1940
- Lieutenant: Thomas Donovan; John Henry Stelle
- Preceded by: Louis L. Emmerson
- Succeeded by: John Henry Stelle

Personal details
- Born: Henry Levy; November 30, 1878 Chicago, Illinois, U.S.
- Died: October 6, 1940 (aged 61) Winnetka, Illinois, U.S.
- Party: Democratic
- Education: University of Chicago; Illinois Institute of Technology (LLB)
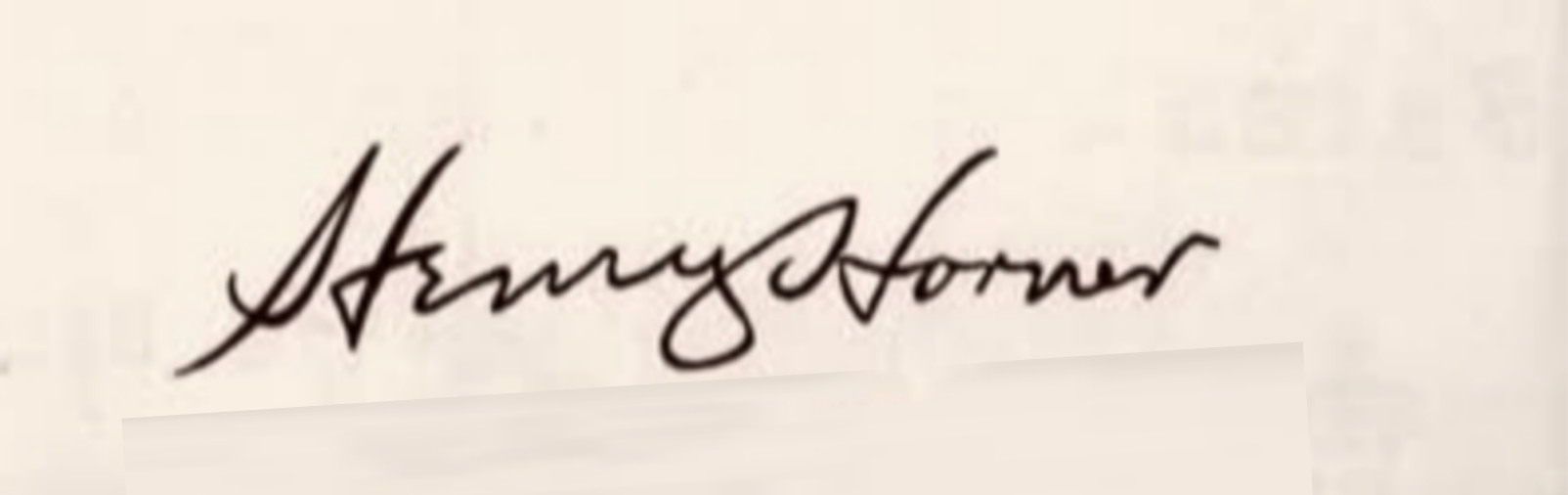
- Signature

Henry Horner (né Levy; November 30, 1878 – October 6, 1940) was an American lawyer and politician. Horner served as the 28th governor of Illinois, serving from January 1933 until his death in October 1940. Horner was noted as the first Jewish governor of Illinois.

During his time as governor, Horner advocated a wide range of progressive reforms in areas such as social welfare and working conditions.

== Early life ==
Horner was born Henry Levy to Solomon Abraham Levy and Dilah Horner in Chicago. He assumed the Horner surname after his parents divorced in 1883. He attended the University of Chicago. Horner attended IIT Chicago-Kent College of Law and received his LLB in 1898. Horner was a lawyer and served as a probate judge from 1915 to 1931.

== Political career ==
portrait of Horner, circa 1934

First elected governor in 1932, Horner served during the difficult years of the Great Depression. Because of a fiscal crisis in Illinois during his first term in office, he was forced to ask the General Assembly for new tax revenue. In 1933, he signed Illinois's first permanent sales tax law into effect with an inaugural rate of 2.0%. Horner also signed a bill in 1935 increasing the Illinois sales tax rate to 3.0%.

His insistence on stopping graft and keeping state payrolls free of non-working patronage appointees put him at odds with the Democratic political organization of Chicago run by Patrick Nash and Mayor Edward Joseph Kelly. They backed a rival candidate in the 1936 primary, Herman Bundesen, the President of the Chicago Board of Public Health and a well-known physician, who carried Cook County, but whom Horner defeated with the help of a large downstate vote.

Horner went on to win re-election in November 1936 and was now determined to defeat the Kelly-Nash machine. He supported the election of Scott W. Lucas to the Senate in 1938 to succeed retiring incumbent William H. Dieterich, who had proven to be antisemitic and somewhat pro-German.

== Later life ==
Horner suffered a stroke four days before the November 1938 election and spent five months recovering in Florida before returning to Illinois, too late to mount the campaign he had wanted to lead against the re-election of Mayor Kelly. Horner's health wavered over the next year until a collapse in the summer of 1940. He convalesced in Winnetka and Highland Park, Illinois from June 1940 until his death, in early October. Horner was succeeded by his fellow Democrat, Lt. Governor John H. Stelle. Horner was a member of Temple B'rith Sholom in Springfield, Illinois.

== Legacies ==
Horner is interred in the Mt. Mayriv section of Zion Gardens Cemetery, a Jewish cemetery in the Dunning neighborhood of Chicago.

- A Jewish summer camp in Ingleside, a suburb of Chicago, is named Camp Henry Horner after him.
- Horner, a lifelong bachelor, collected memorabilia related to Abraham Lincoln and bequeathed it to the people of Illinois. The Horner Collection is now stored and partly displayed in the Abraham Lincoln Presidential Library and Museum in Springfield, Illinois.
- Horner Park, located in Chicago, is a 55-acre (220,000 m^{2}) facility bordered by Montrose Avenue to the north, Irving Park Road to the south, California Avenue to the west, and the north branch of the Chicago River to the east. The Governor Horner State Memorial is located in Horner Park.
- The Chicago Housing Authority built the Henry Horner Homes, a public housing project on Chicago's near–west side; named in honor of Governor Horner in 1957.

== Books ==
- (1969) Thomas B. Littlewood, Horner of Illinois. Northwestern University Press.
- (2007) Charles J. Masters, Governor Henry Horner, Chicago Politics, And The Great Depression. Southern Illinois University Press. ISBN 0-8093-2739-2.

Party political offices
Preceded by Floyd Thompson	Democratic nominee for Governor of Illinois; 1932, 1936	Succeeded by Harry B. Hershey
Political offices
Preceded by Louis Emmerson	Governor of Illinois; 1933–1940	Succeeded by John Stelle
