= List of Clerks of the Supreme Court of Illinois =

The clerk of the Supreme Court of Illinois is an appointed office that was formerly an elected position. From 1848 to 1902, the court had three clerks elected from three districts. From 1902 to 1975, the state had a single clerk that was elected at-large. The position has been appointed since 1975.

== Before 1848 ==
Prior to 1848, the clerk was appointed by the court. Among those who served during this period was Joseph Philips, who served from 1818 until resigning in 1822.

== 1848–1872: clerks elected from three divisions) ==
From 1848 to 1897, three Clerks were elected from each of the three "grand divisions" of the state. Under the Constitution of 1848, these divisions were titled the First Grand Division, Second Grand Division, and Third Grand Division.

=== First Grand Division ===
Name	In office	Political party	Year(s) elected	Note(s)
Finney D. Preston	1848–1855		1848	
Noah Johnson	1855–1867		1855, 1861	
Robert A. D. Wilbanks	1867–1872		1867	

=== Second Grand Division ===
Name	In office	Political party	Year(s) elected	Note(s)
William B. Warren	1848–1855		1848	
William A. Turney	1855–1872		1855, 1861, 1867	

=== Third Grand Division ===
Name	In office	Political party	Year(s) elected	Note(s)
Lorenzo Leland	1848–1867		1848, 1855, 1861	
Woodbury M. Taylor	1867–1872		1867	

== 1872–1902: clerks elected from three divisions (under 1870 Constitution) ==
From the ratification of the 1870 Constitution until a law change in 1897, clerks were elected from three grand divisions titled the Central Grand Division, Northern Grand Division, and Southern Grand Division.

=== Central Grand Division ===
Name	In office	Political party	Year(s) elected	Note(s)
Robert A. D. Wilbanks	1872–1878	Democratic	1872	
Jacob O. Chance	1878–1890	Democratic	1878, 1884	
Frank W. Haville	1890–1896	Democratic	1890	
Jacob O. Chance	1896–Nov. 1900	Republican	1896	died in office
Oliver J. Page	Nov. 6, 1900–1902	Republican	—N/a	appointed to fill the vacancy left by the death of Jacob O. Chance

=== Northern Grand Division ===
Name	In office	Political party	Year(s) elected	Note(s)
Cairo D. Trimble	1872–1878	Republican	1872	
Everell F. Dutton	1878–1884	Republican	1878	
Alfred H. Taylor	1884–1896	Republican	1884, 1890	
Christopher Mamer	1896–1902	Republican	1896	

=== Southern Grand Division ===
Name	In office	Political party	Year(s) elected	Note(s)
Emanuel C. Hamburger	1872–1878	Republican	1872	
Ethan A. Snivley	1878–1896	Democratic	1878, 1884, 1890	
Albert D. Caldwallader	1896–1902	Republican	1896	

== 1903–1975: elected clerk (post-reform, under 1870 Constitution) ==
A 1897 state act consolidated the role of clerk into a single position elected at-large.

Name	Took office	Political party	Year(s) elected	Note(s)
Christopher Mamer	1902–1908	Republican	1902	had served a preceding term as Northern Grand Division clerk
J. McCan Davis	1908–1914	Republican	1908	
Charles W. Vail	1914–1932	Republican	1914, 1920, 1926	
Adam F. Bloch	1932–May 9, 1940	Democratic	1932, 1938	died in office
Edward F. Cullinane	May 11, 1940 – 1944	Democratic	—N/a	appointed to fill vacancy left by the death of Bloch
Earle Benjamin Searcy	1944–Apr. 11, 1955	Republican	1944, 1950	died in office
Fae Searcy (Note: known professionally as "Mrs. Earle B. Searcy")	Apr. 13, 1955–Mar. 23, 1968	Republican	1956, 1962	appointed (in a widow's appointment) after her husband's death in office; won election to two full terms (first woman to win statewide elected office in Illinois); died in office
Clell Woods	Mar. 1968–Jan. 1969	Republican	—N/a	appointed to fill vacancy left by the death of F. Searcy
Justin Taft	Jan. 1969–Jan. 1975	Republican	1968	

== 1975-present: appointed clerk (under 1970 Constitution) ==
Under the reforms imposed by the ratification of the 1970 Constitution, the clerk became an appointed office in 1975.
