= 1964 Illinois elections =

- November 3, 1964
- Turnout: 86.67%

Elections were held in Illinois on Tuesday, November 3, 1964.

Primaries were held on April 14, 1964.

== Election information ==
The elections coincided with Democratic nominee Lyndon B. Johnson's landslide National win in the presidential election (including a win in Illinois). In the state races, Democrats won a supermajority in the state house, which was held as an at-large race due to unusual legal circumstances. Democrat incumbents were also re-elected to all five state constitutional offices on the ballot. Republicans retained a majority in the state senate. Three Democratic incumbents were reelected as trustees of the University of Illinois.

=== Turnout ===
In the primary, turnout was 41.74% with 2,154,941 ballots cast (1,062,320 Democrat and 1,092,621 Republican).

In the general election, turnout was 86.67% with 4,796,641 ballots cast.

== Federal elections ==
=== United States President ===
Illinois voted for the Democratic ticket of Lyndon B. Johnson and Hubert Humphrey.

=== United States House ===
All 24 Illinois seats in the United States House of Representatives were up for election in 1964.

Democrats flipped one seat, leaving the Illinois House delegation to consist of 13 Democrats and 11 Republicans.

== State elections ==
=== Governor ===
1964 Illinois gubernatorial election
- November 3, 1964
- Turnout: 84.15%
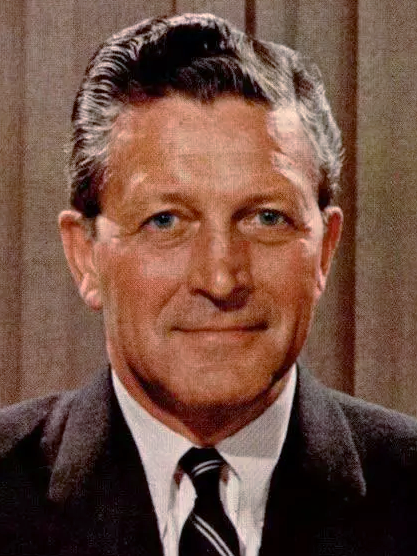

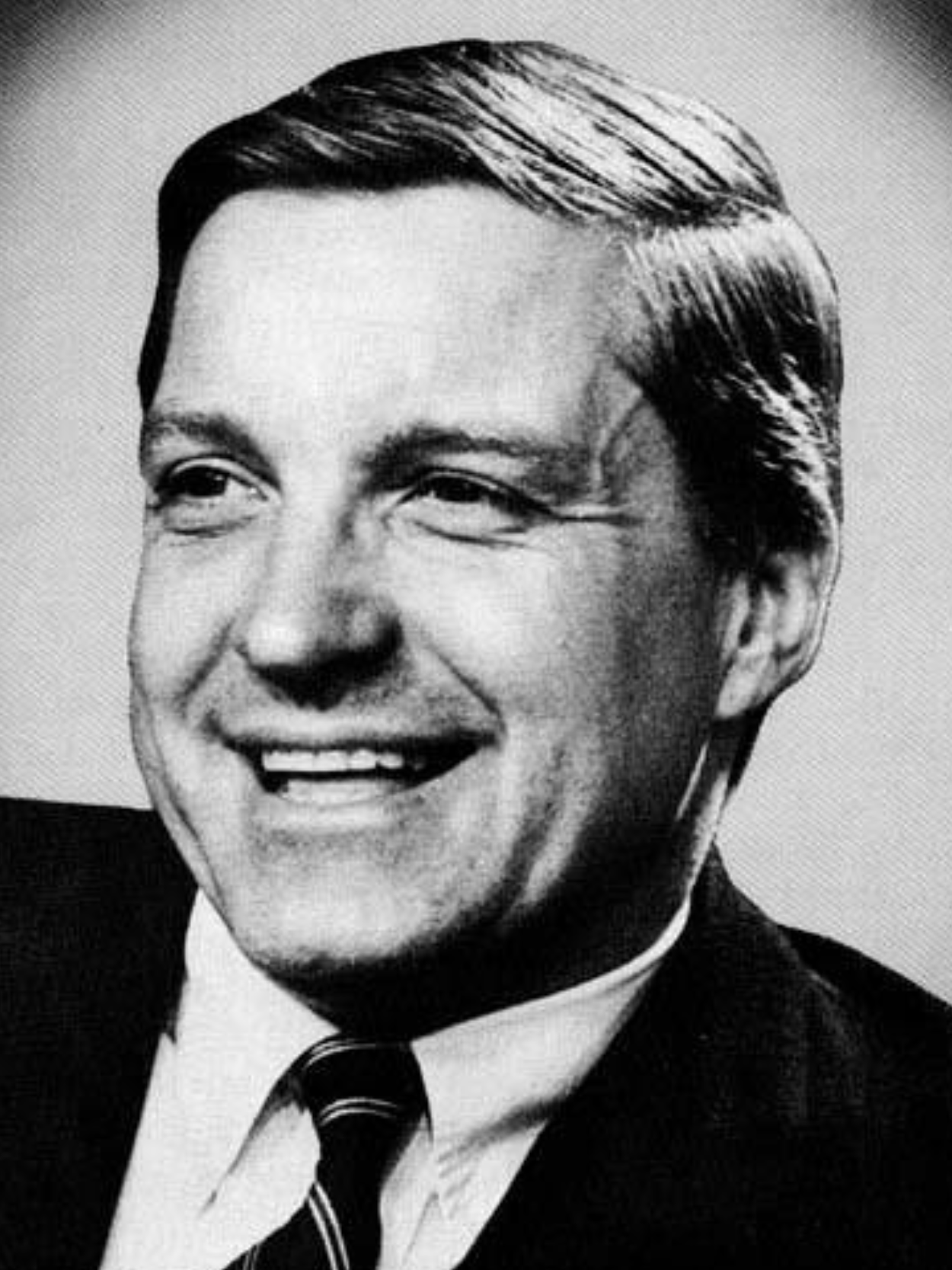
Nominee	Otto Kerner Jr.	Charles H. Percy
Party	Democratic	Republican
Popular vote	2,418,394	2,239,095
Percentage	51.93%	48.08%
- County Results; Kerner: 50–60% 60–70% Percy: 50–60% 60–70%
Governor before election
Otto Kerner Jr.
Democratic
Elected Governor
Otto Kerner Jr.
Democratic

Incumbent Governor Otto Kerner Jr., a Democrat, won reelection.

Gubernatorial election
Party	Candidate	Votes	%
Democratic	Otto Kerner Jr. (incumbent)	2,418,394	51.93
Republican	Charles H. Percy	2,239,095	48.08
Write-in	Others	11	0.00
Total votes		4,657,500	100

=== Lieutenant governor ===
1964 Illinois lieutenant gubernatorial election
- November 3, 1964
- Turnout: 82.13%
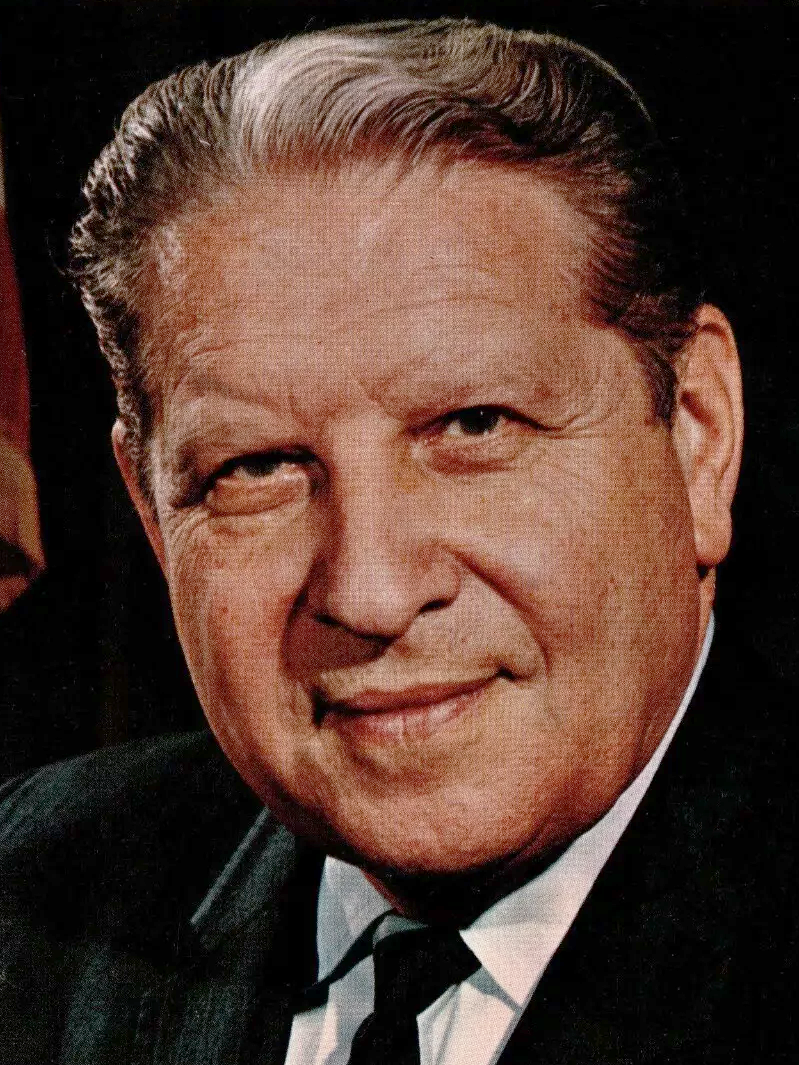

Nominee	Samuel H. Shapiro	John Altorfer
Party	Democratic	Republican
Popular vote	2,462,823	2,082,624
Percentage	54.18%	45.82%
- County results Shapiro: 50–60% 60–70% Altorfer: 50–60% 60–70%
Lieutenant Governor before election
Samuel H. Shapiro
Democratic
Elected Lieutenant Governor
Samuel H. Shapiro
Democratic

Incumbent lieutenant governor Samuel H. Shapiro, a Democrat, won reelection to a second term.

==== Democratic primary ====
Lieutenant gubernatorial Democratic primary
Party	Candidate	Votes	%
Democratic	Samuel H. Shapiro (incumbent)	850,941	100
Write-in	Others	7	0.00
Total votes		850,948	100

==== Republican primary ====
Lieutenant gubernatorial Republican primary
Party	Candidate	Votes	%
Republican	John Henry Altorfer	308,498	33.28
Republican	Warren L. Wood	200,502	21.63
Republican	John A. Graham	126,543	13.65
Republican	Edward J. Pree	118,305	12.76
Republican	Howard J. Doyle	79,928	8.62
Republican	Alan A. Walters	49,048	5.29
Republican	Marvin R. Dee	44,197	4.77
Write-in	Others	36	0.00
Total votes		927,057	100

==== General election ====
Lieutenant gubernatorial election
Party	Candidate	Votes	%
Democratic	Samuel H. Shapiro (incumbent)	2,462,823	54.18
Republican	John Henry Altorfer	2,082,624	45.82
Write-in	Others	3	0.00
Total votes		4,545,450	100

=== Attorney general ===
1964 Illinois Attorney General election
- November 3, 1964
- Turnout: 82.06%
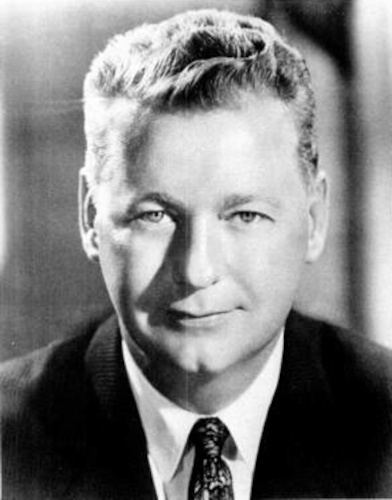

Nominee	William G. Clark	Elroy C. Sandquist
Party	Democratic	Republican
Popular vote	2,530,971	2,010,553
Percentage	55.73%	44.47%
- County results Clark: 50–60% 60–70% 70–80% Sandquist: 50–60% 60–70%
Attorney General before election
William G. Clark
Democratic
Elected Attorney General
William G. Clark
Democratic

Incumbent attorney general William G. Clark, a Democrat, was reelected to a second term.

==== Democratic primary ====
Attorney General Democratic primary
Party	Candidate	Votes	%
Democratic	William G. Clark (incumbent)	849,600	100
Write-in	Others	8	0.00
Total votes		849,608	100

==== Republican primary ====
Attorney General Republican primary
Party	Candidate	Votes	%
Republican	Elroy C. Sandquist	271,991	29.99
Republican	Jack I. Sperling	253,362	27.94
Republican	Robert R. Canfield	213,683	23.56
Republican	William D. Stiehl	127,732	14.08
Republican	William F. Lavelle	40,152	4.43
Write-in	Others	8	0.00
Total votes		906,928	100

==== General election ====
Attorney General election
Party	Candidate	Votes	%
Democratic	William G. Clark (incumbent)	2,530,971	55.73
Republican	Elroy C. Sandquist	2,010,553	44.47
Write-in	Others	1	0.00
Total votes		4,541,525	100

=== Secretary of State ===
1964 Illinois Secretary of State election
- November 3, 1964
- Turnout: 82.14%
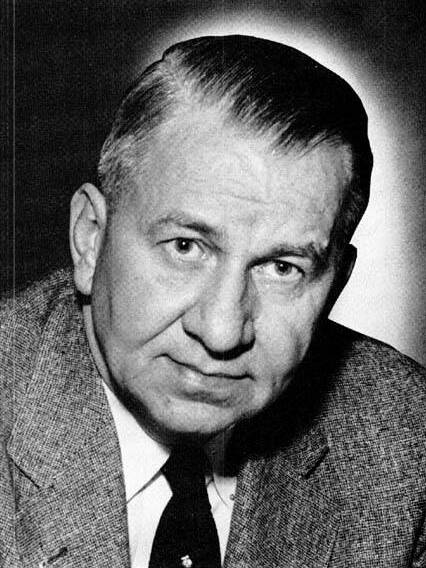

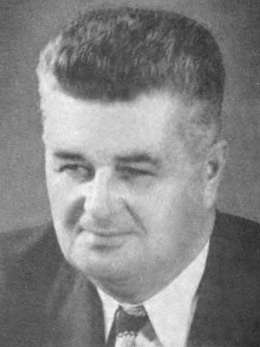
Nominee	Paul Powell	Elmer J. Hoffman
Party	Democratic	Republican
Popular vote	2,517,226	2,028,670
Percentage	55.37%	44.63%
- County results Powell: 50–60% 60–70% 70–80% Hoffman: 50–60% 60–70%
Secretary of State before election
William H. Chamberlain
Democratic
Elected Secretary of State
Paul Powell
Democratic

The incumbent Secretary of State was William H. Chamberlain, a Democrat appointed in 1964. He did not seek reelection. Democrat Paul Powell was elected to succeed him in office.

==== Democratic primary ====
Secretary of State Democratic primary
Party	Candidate	Votes	%
Democratic	Paul T. Powell	860,902	100
Write-in	Others	28	0.00
Total votes		860,930	100

==== Republican primary ====
Secretary of State Republican primary
Party	Candidate	Votes	%
Republican	Elmer J. Hoffman	414,214	44.01
Republican	John P. Meyer	230,159	24.45
Republican	Terrel E. Clarke	146,014	15.51
Republican	Walter J. Haas	56,640	6.02
Republican	Harley D. Jones	55,724	5.92
Republican	Walter E. Pacanowski	38,487	4.09
Write-in	Others	36	0.00
Total votes		941,274	100

==== General election ====
Secretary of State election
Party	Candidate	Votes	%
Democratic	Paul T. Powell	2,517,226	55.37
Republican	Elmer J. Hoffman	2,028,670	44.63
Write-in	Others	16	0.00
Total votes		4,545,912	100

=== Auditor of Public Accounts ===
1964 Illinois Auditor of Public Accounts election
- November 3, 1964
- Turnout: 81.88%
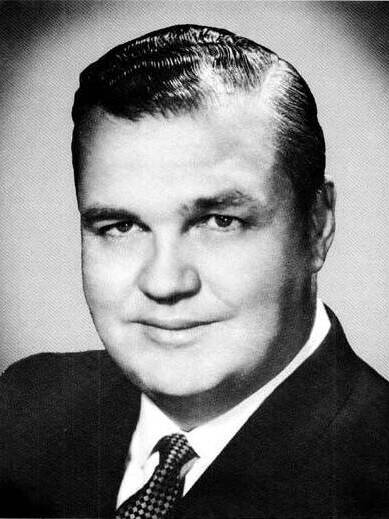

Nominee	Michael Howlett	John Kirby
Party	Democratic	Republican
Popular vote	2,513,831	2,017,951
Percentage	55.47%	44.53
- County results Howlett: 50–60% 60–70% 70–80% Kirby: 50–60% 60–70%
Auditor of Public Accounts before election
Michael Howlett
Democratic
Elected Auditor of Public Accounts
Michael Howlett
Democratic

Incumbent Auditor of Public Accounts Michael Howlett, a Democrat, was reelected to a second term, defeating Republican challenger John Kirby.

==== Democratic primary ====
Howlett won the Democratic primary unopposed.

Auditor of Public Accounts Democratic primary
Party	Candidate	Votes	%
Democratic	Michael J. Howlett (incumbent)	843,204	100
Write-in	Others	5	0.00
Total votes		843,209	100

==== Republican primary ====
John Kirby won the Republican primary.

Candidates

- John William Chapman, former Lieutenant Governor
- Maurice W. Coburn, 1962 Illinois Treasurer candidate, former administrative assistant to the Governor of Illinois (1956–1960), chairman of the Illinois Veterans League, 44th Ward Precinct Captain, former President of the Young Conservative Club, lawyer
- Louis "Lou" Haenle
- James P. Hennessy
- Gordon E. Kerr, Illinois State Senator
- John Kirby
- Walter E. McCarron, Cook County Coroner
- Sherwin Willens, businessman

Results

Auditor of Public Accounts Republican primary
Party	Candidate	Votes	%
Republican	John Kirby	245,015	27.33
Republican	John William Chapman	190,271	21.22
Republican	Gordon E. Kerr	129,363	14.43
Republican	Walter E. McCarron	94,548	10.55
Republican	Maurice W Coburn	80,877	9.02
Republican	James P. Hennessy	74,322	8.29
Republican	Sherwin Willens	64,528	7.20
Republican	Louis "Lou" Haenle	17,568	1.96
Write-in	Others	30	0.00
Total votes		896,522	100

==== General election ====
Auditor of Public Accounts election
Party	Candidate	Votes	%
Democratic	Michael J. Howlett (incumbent)	2,513,831	55.47
Republican	John Kirby	2,017,951	44.53
Write-in	Others	1	0.00
Total votes		4,531,783	100

=== State Senate ===
Seats of the Illinois Senate were up for election in 1964. Republicans retained control of the chamber.

=== State House of Representatives ===
All 177 seats in the Illinois House of Representatives were up for election in 1964. Due to the state's failure to redistrict, the election was held at-large, with all candidates listed on one ballot that contained 236 names and spread 33 inches long. Both the Democrats and the Republicans nominated 118 candidates. Plurality block voting was used, each voter could vote for up to 177 candidates, and a straight-ticket option was also available.

Every Democratic candidate won, flipping the chamber and giving Democrats a super-majority in the state House. Democrats won a total of 118 seats to Republican's 59 seats.

(By 1968 the districting was done and the use of cumulative voting was resumed.)

=== Trustees of University of Illinois ===
1964 Trustees of University of Illinois election
- November 3, 1964

An election was held for three of nine seats for Trustees of University of Illinois.

The election saw the reelection of first term Democratic incumbent Howard Clement, second-term Democratic incumbent Harold Pogue, as well as fellow Democratic incumbent Theodore A. Jones (who had been appointed to fill a vacancy in 1963).

Trustees of the University of Illinois election
Party	Candidate	Votes	%
Democratic	Howard W. Clement (incumbent)	2,514,840	18.60
Democratic	Theodore A. Jones (incumbent)	2,484,508	18.38
Democratic	Harold A. Pogue (incumbent)	2,440,845	18.05
Republican	Park Livingston	2,075,034	15.35
Republican	C. Ernest Lovejoy	2,013,525	14.89
Republican	James A. Weatherly	1,992,575	14.76
Write-in	Others	2	0.00
Total votes		13,521,329	100

=== Ballot measures ===
Two ballot measures were put before voters in 1966, both of them legislatively referred constitutional amendments.

In order to be placed on the ballot, proposed legislatively referred constitutional amendments needed to be approved by two-thirds of each house of the Illinois General Assembly. In order to be approved, they required approval of either two-thirds of those voting on the amendment itself or a majority of all ballots cast in the general elections.

==== Annual Legislative Sessions Amendment ====
The Annual Legislative Sessions Amendment, a legislatively referred constitutional amendment, was put to a vote. It would have amended Section 9 of Article IV of the Illinois Constitution. It failed to meet either threshold for passage.

Annual Legislative Sessions Amendment
Option	Votes	% of votes on referendum	% of all ballots cast
Yes	2,290,263	63.10	47.75
No	1,339,540	36.90	27.93
Total votes	3,629,803	100	75.67
Voter turnout	65.58%		

Amendment results by county Yes: 70–80%; 60–70%; 50–60%; No: 50–60%

==== Continuity of Governmental Operations in Periods of Emergency Amendment ====
The Continuity of Governmental Operations in Periods of Emergency Amendment, a legislatively referred constitutional amendment, was put to a vote. It would have amended Section 35 of Article IV of the Illinois Constitution. It failed to meet either threshold for passage.

Continuity of Governmental Operations in Periods of Emergency Amendment
Option	Votes	% of votes on referendum	% of all ballots cast
Yes	1,808,491	50.62	37.70
No	1,275,871	35.71	26.60
Total votes	3,572,966	100	74.49
Voter turnout	64.56%		

Amendment results by county Yes: 80–90%; 70–80%; 60–70%; 50–60%

== Local elections ==
Local elections were held.
