= 1968 Illinois elections =

- November 5, 1968
- Turnout: 82.91%

Elections were held in Illinois on Tuesday, November 5, 1968.

Primaries were held on June 11, 1968.

== Election information ==
=== Turnout ===
In the primary, turnout was 28.84% with 1,573,173 ballots cast (833,498 Democrat and 739,675 Republican).

In the general election, turnout was 82.91% with 4,705,852 ballots cast.

== Federal elections ==
=== United States President ===
Illinois voted for the Republican ticket of Richard Nixon and Spiro Agnew.

=== United States Senate ===
Incumbent Senator Everett M. Dirksen, a Republican, won reelection to a fourth term.

=== United States House ===
All 24 Illinois seats in the United States House of Representatives were up for election in 1968.

No seats switched parties, leaving the Illinois House delegation to continue to consist of 12 Democrats and 12 Republicans.

== State elections ==
=== Governor ===
1968 Illinois gubernatorial election
- November 5, 1968
- Turnout: 79.39%
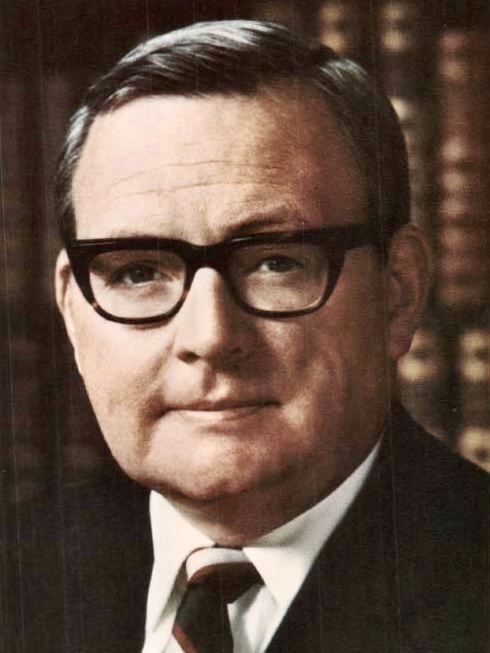

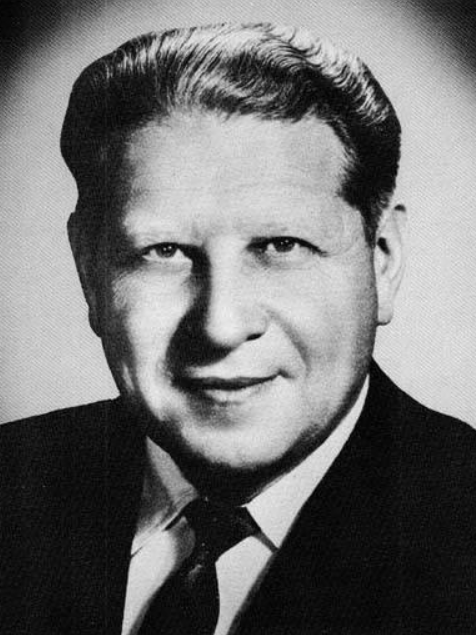
Nominee	Richard B. Ogilvie	Samuel Shapiro
Party	Republican	Democratic
Popular vote	2,307,295	2,179,501
Percentage	51.2%	48.4%
- County Results Ogilvie: 40–50% 50–60% 60–70% 70–80% Shapiro: 40–50% 50–60%
Governor before election
Samuel Shapiro
Democratic
Elected Governor
Richard B. Ogilvie
Republican

Incumbent Democratic Governor Samuel Shapiro lost reelection to Republican Richard B. Ogilvie.

Gubernatorial election
Party	Candidate	Votes	%
Republican	Richard B. Ogilvie	2,307,295	51.21
Democratic	Samuel H. Shapiro (incumbent)	2,179,501	48.37
Socialist Labor	Edward C. Gross	19,175	0.43
Write-in	Others	29	0.00
Total votes		4,506,000	

=== Lieutenant governor ===
1968 Illinois lieutenant gubernatorial election
- November 5, 1968
- Turnout: 76.96%
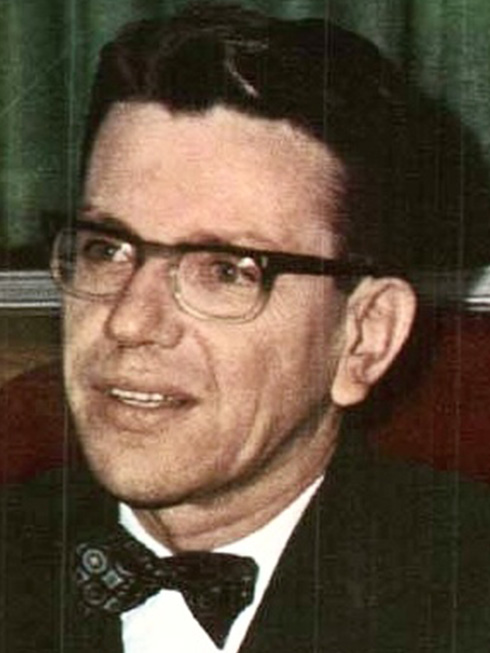

Nominee	Paul Simon	Robert A. Dwyer
Party	Democratic	Republican
Popular vote	2,222,331	2,125,910
Percentage	50.87%	48.67%
- County results Simon: 50–60% 60–70% Dwyer: 50–60% 60–70% 70–80%
Lieutenant Governor before election
Vacant
Elected Lieutenant Governor
Paul Simon
Democratic

Democrat Paul Simon was elected to serve as lieutenant governor.

This was the only time in Illinois history that the state had the elected a governor and a lieutenant governor from different political parties (there were, however, instances in Illinois where an appointed lieutenant governor had been of a different political party than the governor).

Due to changes implemented by the passage of the 1970 Constitution of Illinois, in all subsequent elections, gubernatorial and lieutenant gubernatorial candidates have been jointly elected on a ticket. Therefore, this was the last Illinois election held for the sole purpose of electing a lieutenant governor.

==== Democratic primary ====
Lieutenant gubernatorial Democratic primary
Party	Candidate	Votes	%
Democratic	Paul Simon	600,369	100
Write-in	Others	6	0.00
Total votes		600,375	100

==== Republican primary ====
Robert A. Dwyer, an insurance executive from Winnetka ran unopposed for the Republican nomination.

Lieutenant gubernatorial Republican primary
Party	Candidate	Votes	%
Republican	Robert A. Dwyer	534,882	100
Write-in	Others	6	0.00
Total votes		534,888	100

==== General election ====
Lieutenant gubernatorial election
Party	Candidate	Votes	%
Democratic	Paul Simon	2,222,331	50.87
Republican	Robert A. Dwyer	2,125,910	48.67
Socialist Labor	Stanley L. Prorok	20,122	0.46
Write-in	Others	2	0.00
Total votes		4,368,365	

=== Attorney general ===
1968 Illinois Attorney General election
- November 5, 1968
- Turnout: 79.79%
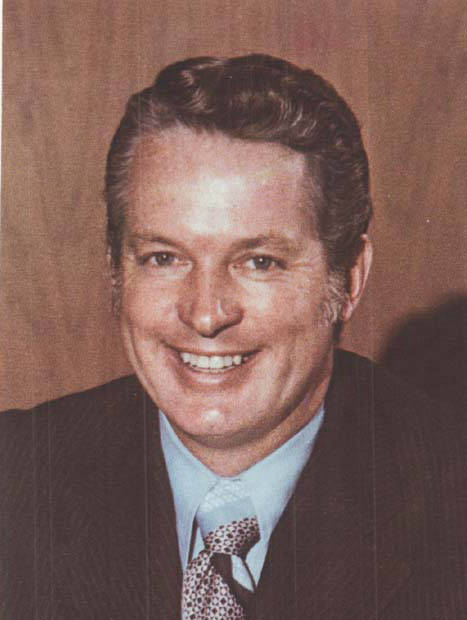

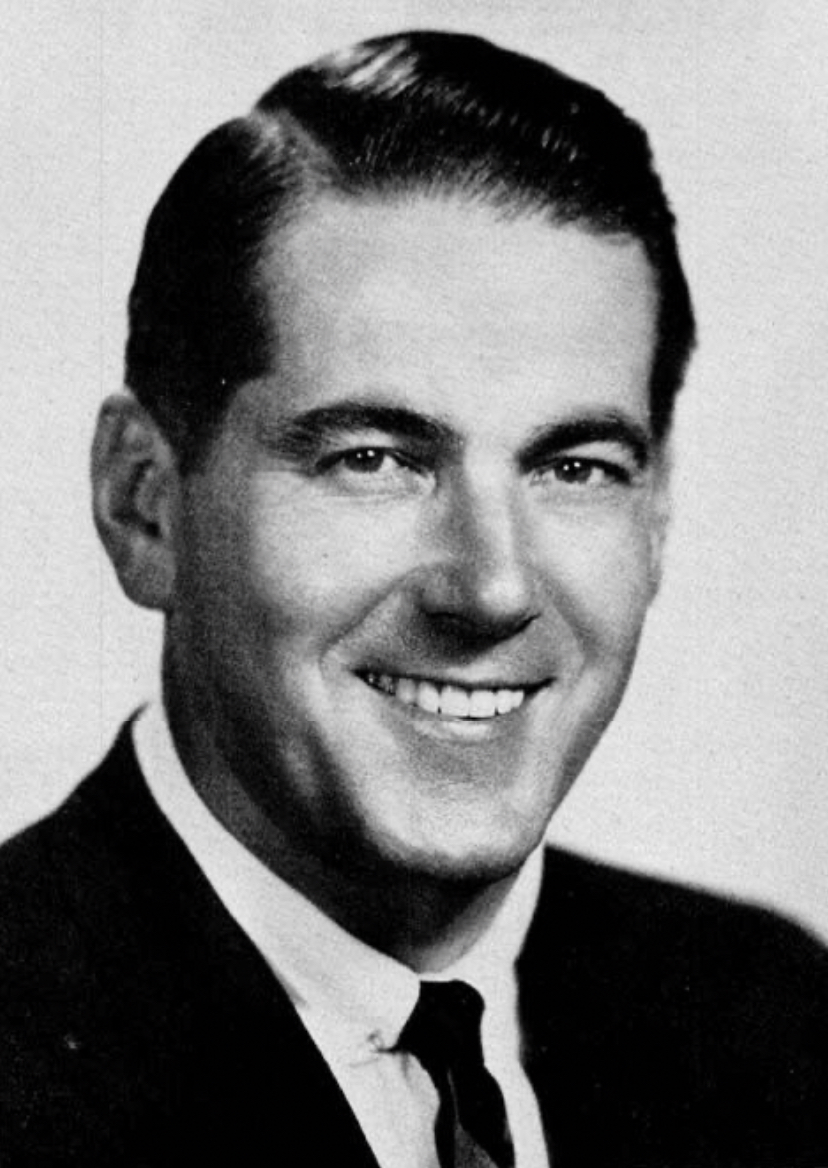
Nominee	William J. Scott	Francis S. Lorenz
Party	Republican	Democratic
Popular vote	2,898,198	2,322,572
Percentage	52.71%	46.89%
- County results Scott: 50–60% 60–70% 70–80% Lorenz: 50–60% Tie: 40–50%
Attorney General before election
William G. Clark
Democratic
Elected Attorney General
William J. Scott
Republican

Incumbent attorney general William G. Clark, a Democrat, did not seek a third term. Republican William J. Scott was elected to succeed him.

==== Democratic primary ====
Attorney General Democratic primary
Party	Candidate	Votes	%
Democratic	Francis S. Lorenz	611,138	100
Write-in	Others	14	0.00
Total votes		611,152	100

==== Republican primary ====
Attorney General Republican primary
Party	Candidate	Votes	%
Republican	William J. Scott	581,595	76.67
Write-in	Others	1	0.00
Total votes		581,595	100

==== General election ====
Attorney General election
Party	Candidate	Votes	%
Republican	William J. Scott	2,322,572	52.71
Democratic	Francis S. Lorenz	2,065,984	46.89
Socialist Labor	George P. Milonas	17,488	0.40
Write-in	Others	2	0.00
Total votes		4,528,836	100

=== Secretary of State ===
1968 Illinois Secretary of State election
- November 5, 1968
- Turnout: 78.81%
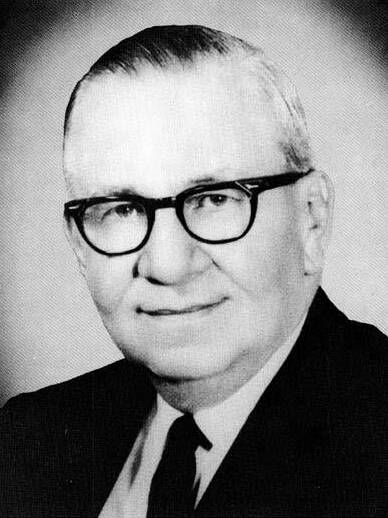

Nominee	Paul Powell	Donald D. Carpentier
Party	Democratic	Republican
Popular vote	2,278,868	2,173,839
Percentage	50.94%	48.59%
- County results Powell: 50–60% 60–70% Carpentier: 40–50% 50–60% 60–70%
Secretary of State before election
Paul Powell
Democratic
Elected Secretary of State
Paul Powell
Democratic

Incumbent Secretary of State Paul Powell, a Democrat, was reelected to a second term.

==== Democratic primary ====
Secretary of State Democratic primary
Party	Candidate	Votes	%
Democratic	Paul Powell (incumbent)	617,231	100
Write-in	Others	47	0.01
Total votes		617,278	100

==== Republican primary ====
Secretary of State Republican primary
Party	Candidate	Votes	%
Republican	Donald D. Carpentier	502,497	76.67
Republican	Brian B. Duff	153,017	23.34
Write-in	Others	6	0.00
Total votes		655,520	100

==== General election ====
Secretary of State election
Party	Candidate	Votes	%
Democratic	Paul T. Powell (incumbent)	2,278,868	50.94
Republican	Donald D. Carpentier	2,173,839	48.59
Socialist Labor	George LaForest	20,664	0.46
Write-in	Others	9	0.00
Total votes		4,473,380	100

=== Auditor of Public Accounts ===
1968 Illinois Auditor of Public Accounts election
- November 3, 1968
- Turnout: 76.54%
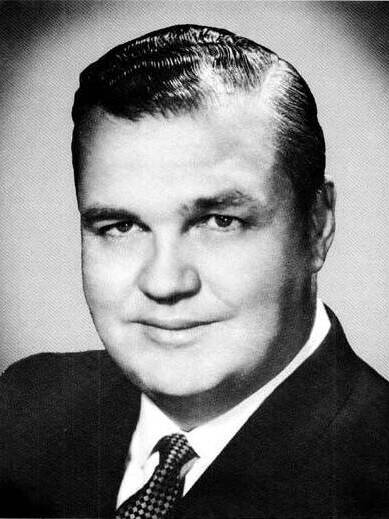

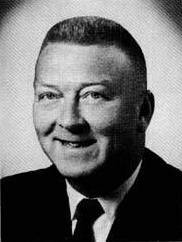
Nominee	Michael Howlett	William C. Harris
Party	Democratic	Republican
Popular vote	2,215,401	2,106,676
Percentage	50.99%	48.49%
Auditor of Public Accounts before election
Michael Howlett
Democratic
Elected Auditor of Public Accounts
Michael Howlett
Democratic

Incumbent Auditor of Public Accounts Michael Howlett, a Democrat, was reelected to a third term.

==== Democratic primary ====
Auditor of Public Accounts Democratic primary
Party	Candidate	Votes	%
Democratic	Michael J. Howlett (incumbent)	591,297	100
Write-in	Others	13	0.00
Total votes		591,310	100

==== Republican primary ====
Auditor of Public Accounts Republican primary
Party	Candidate	Votes	%
Republican	William C. Harris	272,742	46.26
Republican	Terrel E. Clarke	183,855	31.19
Republican	Wesley W. "Wes" Olson	132,932	22.55
Write-in	Others	1	0.00
Total votes		589,530	100

==== General election ====
Auditor of Public Accounts election
Party	Candidate	Votes	%
Democratic	Michael J. Howlett (incumbent)	2,215,401	50.99
Republican	William C. Harris	2,106,676	48.49
Socialist Labor	Elizabeth Schnur	22,591	0.52
Write-in	Others	1	0.00
Total votes		4,344,669	100

=== Clerk of the Supreme Court ===
1968 Clerk of the Supreme Court election
- November 5, 1968
- Turnout: 76.46%
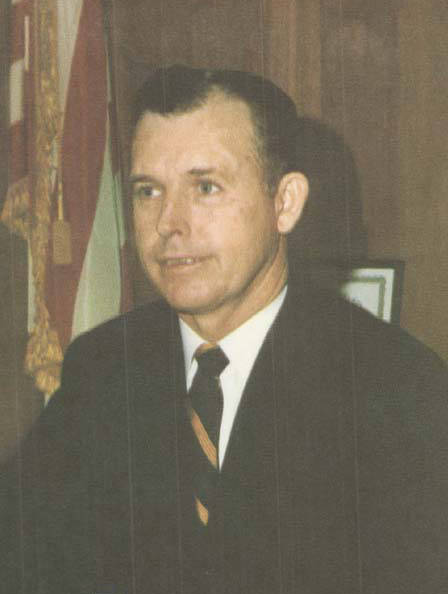

Nominee	Justin Taft	Fannie G. Jones
Party	Republican	Democratic
Popular vote	2,286,086	2,032,768
Percentage	52.68%	46.84%
Clerk before election
Clell Woods
Elected Clerk
Justin Taft
Republican

The Clerk of the Supreme Court election was won by Republican nominee Justin Taft.

Ahead of the election, the incumbent clerk was Clell Woods, who had temporarily assumed the office after the death of clerk Fae Searcy earlier in 1968. Woods, like Searcy, was a Republican. The 1970 Constitution of Illinois made it so that the office would become an appointive office by 1975, thus rendering the 1968 election the last instance in which an election was held for this office.

==== Democratic primary ====
Clerk of the Supreme Court Democratic primary
Party	Candidate	Votes	%
Democratic	Fannie G. Jones	565,289	100
Write-in	Others	5	0.00
Total votes		565,294	100

==== Republican primary ====
Incumbent Clerk of the Supreme Court Fae Searcy died in office on March 25, 1968. However, she had already filed to be on the ballot before her death. Instead of being listed by her own name, Fae Searcy opted to be listed on the ballot as "Mrs. Earle Benjamin Searcy", her legal name. She had succeeded her husband in the office after his own death. Mrs. Searcy remained on the ballot, and received 32 percent of the vote despite being dead. However, Justin Taft outperformed her, with 45.01 percent of the vote, winning the nomination.

Clerk of the Supreme Court Republican primary
Party	Candidate	Votes	%
Republican	Justin Taft	264,959	45.01
Republican	Fae Searcy (deceased; was incumbent at time of death)	188,635	32.04
Republican	Louise Emerson	135,103	22.95
Write-in	Others	5	0.00
Total votes		588,702	100

==== General election ====
Clerk of the Supreme Court election
Party	Candidate	Votes	%
Republican	Justin Taft	2,286,086	52.68
Democratic	Fannie G. Jones	2,032,768	46.84
Socialist Labor	Gregory P. Lyngas	21,117	0.49
Write-in	Others	1	0.00
Total votes		4,339,972	100

=== State Senate ===
Seats of the Illinois Senate were up for election in 1968. Republicans retained control of the chamber.

=== State House of Representatives ===
Seats in the Illinois House of Representatives were up for election in 1968. Republicans retained control of the chamber.

=== Trustees of University of Illinois ===
1968 Trustees of University of Illinois election
- November 5, 1968

An election using cumulative voting was held for three of nine seats for Trustees of University of Illinois system.

The election saw the reelection of incumbent third-term Republican Timothy W. Swain and incumbent second-term Republican member Earl M. Hughes and the election of new Republican member Russell W. "Ruck" Steger.

Incumbent Democrat Kenney E. Williamson (appointed in 1967 after the death in office of Wayne A. Johnston) lost reelection.

Trustees of the University of Illinois election
Party	Candidate	Votes	%
Republican	Timothy W. Swain (incumbent)	2,246,505	17.49
Republican	Earl M. Hughes (incumbent)	2,222,696	17.30
Republican	Russell W. Steger	2,176,223	16.94
Democratic	Kenney E. Williamson (incumbent)	2,063,859	16.06
Democratic	Timothy R. Ives	2,043,974	15.91
Democratic	Frances Best Watkins	2,003,652	15.60
Socialist Labor	Edwin L. Williams	33,031	0.26
Socialist Labor	Henry Schilling	31,399	0.24
Socialist Labor	Clarys L. Essex	26,768	0.21
Write-in	Others	2	0.00
Total votes		12,848,109	100

=== Judicial elections ===
Judicial elections were held, including two elections to fill vacancies on the Illinois Appellate Court.

=== Ballot measures ===
Three ballot measures were up for election in 1968, a legislatively referred state statute, a bond measure, and a call for a constitutional convention.

In order to be approved, legislatively referred state statues required the support of a majority of those voting on the statute. Bond measures needed a vote equal to majority of the votes cast for whichever chamber of the Illinois General Assembly had the highest cumulative vote count. A call for a constitutional convention required votes equal to a majority of the all ballots cast in the general election.

==== Illinois Banking Act ====
Illinois Banking Act was approved by voters as a legislatively referred state statue. It enabled Illinois state banks to have foreign branches.

Illinois Banking Act
Candidate	Votes	%
Yes	1,776,492	61.95
No	1,091,116	38.05
Total votes	2,867,608	100
Turnout	{{{votes}}}	50.52%

Act results by county Yes: 70–80%; 60–70%; 50–60%; No: 60–70%; 50–60%

==== Illinois Natural Resources Development Bond Act ====
Illinois Natural Resources Development Bond Act, a legislatively referred bond question, failed to pass. It proposed a $1 billion bond act for the development of natural resources.

Bond measures needed a vote equal to majority of the votes cast for whichever chamber of the Illinois General Assembly had the highest cumulative vote count. In this election, the highest turnout for a chamber's elections was 4,268,956, so the needed vote total for the measure to have pass would have been 2,134,479.

Illinois Natural Resources Development Bond Act
Option	Votes	% of highest legislative vote cast
Yes	1,656,600	38.81
No	1,216,814	28.50
Total votes	2,873,414	67.31
Voter turnout	50.62%	

Act results by county No: 70–80%; 60–70%; 50–60%; Yes: 70–80%; 60–70%; 50–60%

==== Proposed call for a Constitutional Convention ====
In 1968, voters were presented with a referendum on whether to call a constitutional convention. This was the first such vote held in the State of Illinois since 1934. That call failed. The chief sponsor of the legislation that created this ballot measure was Senate Republican leader W. Russell Arrington. Democratic Governor Otto Kerner Jr. was supportive of holding a constitutional convention.

The call for the convention required the votes of an equal majority of all ballots cast in the 1968 general elections.

A constitutional convention was subsequently held, and the resulting Constitution of Illinois was approved by Illinois voters in a 1970 special election.

Proposed call for a Constitutional Convention
Option	Votes	% of all ballots cast
Yes	2,979,972	63.33
No	1,135,440	24.13
Total votes	4,115,412	87.45
Voter turnout	72.50%	

Convention results by county Yes: 80–90%; 70–80%; 60–70%; 50–60%; No: 60–70%; 50–60%

== Local elections ==
Local elections were held.
