= Paul Powell (politician) =

American politician (1902–1970)

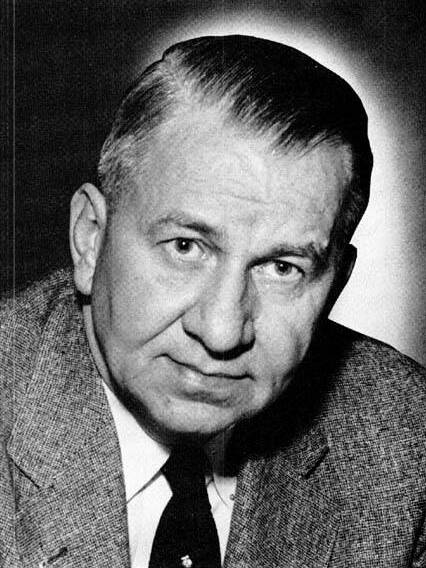
- Official portrait, 1965

31st Secretary of State of Illinois
- In office 1965 – October 10, 1970
- Governor: Otto Kerner Jr. Samuel H. Shapiro; Richard B. Ogilvie
- Preceded by: William H. Chamberlain
- Succeeded by: John W. Lewis Jr.

56th & 58th Speaker of the Illinois House of Representatives
- In office January 7, 1959 – January 9, 1963
- Preceded by: Warren L. Wood
- Succeeded by: John W. Lewis Jr.
- In office January 10, 1949 – January 8, 1951
- Preceded by: Hugh Green
- Succeeded by: Warren L. Wood

Personal details
- Born: January 21, 1902 Vienna, Illinois, U.S.
- Died: October 10, 1970 (aged 68) Rochester, Minnesota, U.S.
- Party: Democratic

Paul Taylor Powell (January 21, 1902 – October 10, 1970) was an American Democratic politician from Illinois, and Illinois Secretary of State from 1965 until his death in 1970, after which he was discovered to have been corrupt and became known for his saying "There's only one thing worse than a defeated politician, and that's a broke one."

== Political career ==
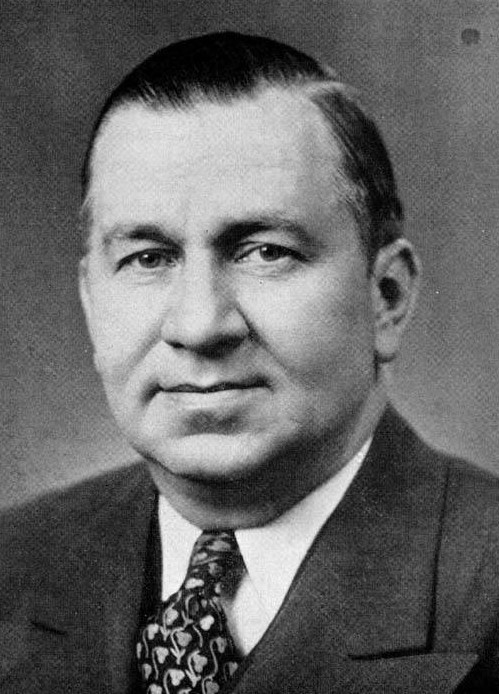
Official portrait, circa 1949

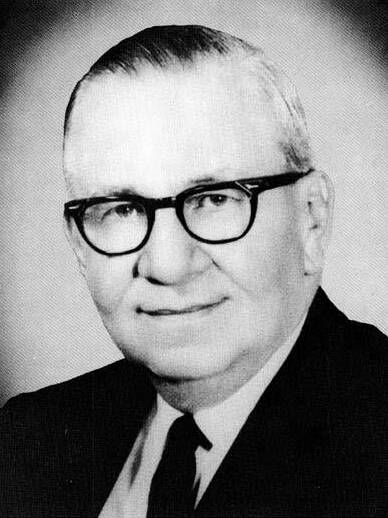
Official portrait, circa 1967

Involved in Illinois politics since the late 1930s, Powell was the Speaker of the Illinois House of Representatives from 1949 to 1950, and again from 1959 to 1963. In 1959, Powell, a Democrat, was elected Speaker by a bipartisan coalition of Republicans and downstate Democrats against Joseph De La Cour, the candidate of Richard J. Daley who had majority backing within the Chicago-dominated Democratic caucus.

Powell was elected Illinois Secretary of State in 1964. The following year, he was investigated by a grand jury for pushing legislation favorable to a horse racing company that he obtained stock in, but nothing came of it. During his tenure, practice was that any payments made to the Secretary of State's office were made out to simply "Paul Powell". Unsuspecting Illinois residents thought they were writing personal checks for license plate registration.

== Death, scandal and shoeboxes ==
Powell died on October 10, 1970, in Rochester, Minnesota, as an outpatient of the Mayo Clinic.

Powell's chief assistant Nicholas Ciaccio claimed to have found Powell's body, but it turned out later that Ciaccio had not been in Minnesota at the time; to the contrary, shortly afterwards, after hearing of Powell's death, Ciaccio was in Powell's Springfield office clearing out papers and other material.

Although Powell's government salary was never more than $30,000 a year, shoeboxes, briefcases and strongboxes with over $750,000 in cash were found in his hotel suite residence at the St. Nicholas Hotel in Springfield, Illinois within days of his death. Another $50,000 was found in his office. In his hotel room he also had 49 cases of whiskey, 14 transistor radios, and two cases of creamed corn. When settled in 1978 his estate was worth $4.6 million, of which $1 million was stock in seven Illinois racetracks. A federal investigation determined that Powell had acquired much of his wealth through illegal cash bribes, which he received for giving noncompetitive state contracts to political associates. The State of Illinois received a $222,999 settlement from his estate; in addition, several state contractors were imprisoned for their roles in the affair.

Party political offices
Preceded by James R. McLaughlin	Democratic nominee for Secretary of State of Illinois; 1964, 1968	Succeeded by Michael Howlett
Political offices
Preceded by William H. Chamberlain	Secretary of State of Illinois; 1965–1970	Succeeded by John W. Lewis Jr.
