= 1958 Illinois elections =

- November 4, 1958
- Turnout: 67.72%

Elections were held in Illinois on Tuesday, November 4, 1958.

Primaries were held April 8, 1958.

== Election information ==
1958 was a midterm election year in the United States.

=== Turnout ===
In the primary election, 1,594,388 ballots were cast (831,502 Democratic and 762,886 Republican).

In the general election, turnout was 67.72% with 3,427,278 ballots cast.

== Federal elections ==
=== United States House ===
All 25 Illinois seats in the United States House of Representatives were up for election in 1958.

Democrats flipped three Republican-held seats, leaving the Illinois House delegation to consist of 14 Democrats and 11 Republicans.

== State elections ==
=== Treasurer ===
1958 Illinois State Treasurer election
- November 4, 1958
- Turnout: 63.98%
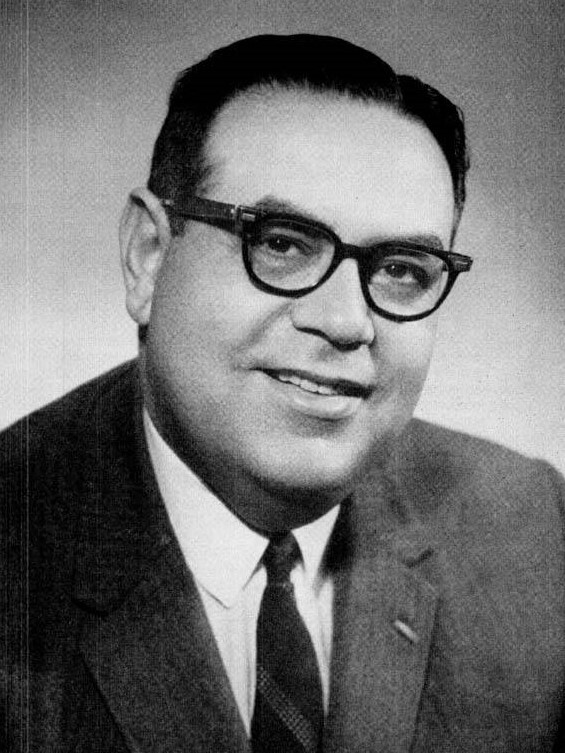

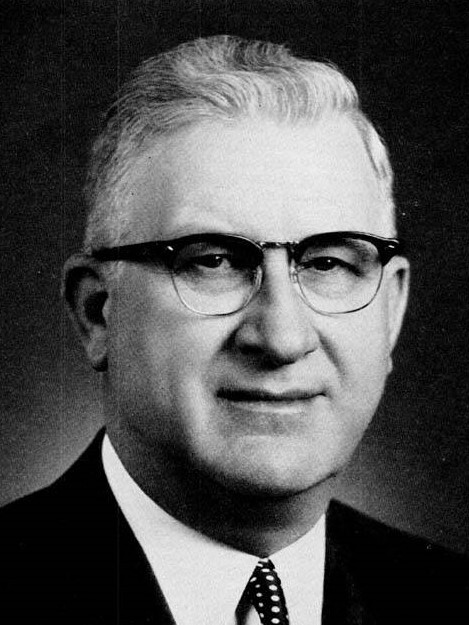
Nominee	Joseph D. Lohman	Warren Wright
Party	Democratic	Republican
Popular vote	1,688,809	1,548,902
Percentage	52.16%	47.84%
- County results Lohman: 50–60% 60–70% Wright: 50–60% 60–70% 70–80%
Treasurer before election
Francis S. Lorenz
Democratic
Elected Treasurer
Joseph D. Lohman
Democratic

Incumbent Treasurer, Republican Elmer J. Hoffman, did not seek reelection, instead running successfully for Illinois's 14th congressional district. Democrat Joseph D. Lohman was elected to succeed him, defeating former two-term Illinois Treasurer, Republican Warren Wright.

==== Democratic primary ====
Treasurer Democratic primary
Party	Candidate	Votes	%
Democratic	Joseph D. Lohman	650,222	100
Write-in	Others	4	0.00
Total votes		650,226	100

==== Republican primary ====
Former treasurer Warren Wright won the Republican primary, defeating State Representative Louis E. Beckman Jr.

Treasurer Republican primary
Party	Candidate	Votes	%
Republican	Warren E. Wright	373,876	56.58
Republican	Louis E. Beckman	286,893	43.42
Write-in	Others	3	0.00
Total votes		660,772	100

==== General election ====
Treasurer election
Party	Candidate	Votes	%
Democratic	Joseph D. Lohman	1,688,809	52.16
Republican	Warren E. Wright	1,548,902	47.84
Total votes		3,237,711	100

=== Superintendent of Public Instruction ===
1958 Illinois Superintendent of Public Instruction election
- November 4, 1958
- Turnout: 70.87%
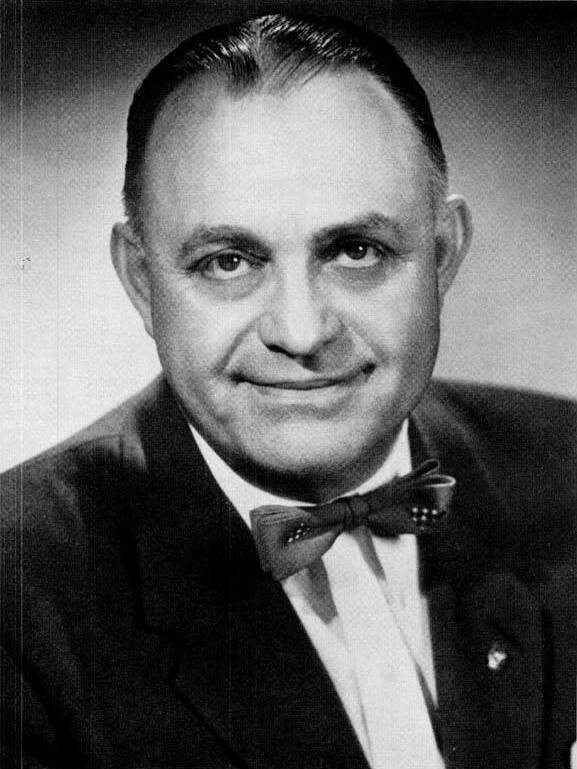

Nominee	George T. Wilkins	Gerald W. Smith
Party	Democratic	Republican
Popular vote	1,685,877	1,477,332
Percentage	53.30%	46.70%
- County results Wilkins: 50–60% 60–70% 70–80% Smith: 50–60% 60–70% 70–80%
Superintendent before election
Vernon L. Nickell
Republican
Elected Superintendent
George T. Wilkins
Democratic

Incumbent Superintendent of Public Instruction Vernon L. Nickell, a fourth-term Republican, did not seek reelection. Democrat George T. Wilkins was elected to succeed him.

==== Democratic primary ====
Superintendent of Public Instruction Democratic primary
Party	Candidate	Votes	%
Democratic	George T. Wilkins	615,058	100
Write-in	Others	1	0.00
Total votes		615,059	100

==== Republican primary ====
Superintendent of Public Instruction Republican primary
Party	Candidate	Votes	%
Republican	Gerald W. Smith	483,027	78.94
Republican	Lar "America First" Daly	128,861	21.06
Write-in	Others	6	0.00
Total votes		611,894	100

==== General election ====
Superintendent of Public Instruction election
Party	Candidate	Votes	%
Democratic	George T. Wilkins	1,685,877	53.30
Republican	Gerald W. Smith	1,477,332	46.70
Total votes		3,163,209	100

=== State Senate ===
Seats in the Illinois Senate were up for election in 1958. Republicans retained control of the chamber.

=== State House of Representatives ===
Seats in the Illinois House of Representatives were up for election in 1958. Democrats flipped control of the chamber.

=== Trustees of University of Illinois ===
1958 Trustees of University of Illinois election
- November 4, 1958

An election was held for three of nine seats for Trustees of University of Illinois.

The election saw the reelection of one-term member former member Harold Pogue and the election of new Democratic members Howard W. Clement, Richard A. Harewood.

The election saw third-term incumbent Republican Park Livingston, second term Republican incumbent Doris Simpson Holt and first-term incumbent Republican Cushman B. Bissell lose reelection.

Trustees of the University of Illinois election
Party	Candidate	Votes	%
Democratic	Harold Pogue	1,718,370	18.32
Democratic	Howard W. Clement	1,671,895	17.82
Democratic	Richard A. Harewood	1,653,654	17.63
Republican	Park Livingston (incumbent)	1,487,954.5	15.86
Republican	Cushman B. Bissell (incumbent)	1,448,903	15.45
Republican	Doris Simpson Holt (incumbent)	1,400,456.5	14.93
Total votes		9,381,233	100

=== Judicial elections ===
==== Lower courts ====
On June 8, 1958, the Superior Court of Cook County held three regular elections and two special elections. On September 2, 1958, a special election was held for a vacant seat on the 12th Judicial Circuit.

=== Ballot measures ===
Three ballot measures were put before voters in 1958. One was a legislatively referred state statutes and two were legislatively referred constitutional amendments.

In order to be approved, legislatively referred state statues required the support of a majority of those voting on the statute. In order to be placed on the ballot, proposed legislatively referred constitutional amendments needed to be approved by two-thirds of each house of the Illinois General Assembly. In order to be approved, they required approval of either two-thirds of those voting on the amendment itself or a majority of all ballots cast in the general elections.

==== County Officers Re-election Amendment ====
The County Officers Re-election Amendment, a legislatively referred constitutional amendment which would amend Article VI of the 1870 Constitution of Illinois, failed to meet either threshold for approval. The amendment would have permitted county sheriffs and treasurers to be elected to successive terms.

In order for constitutional amendments to be passed by voters, they required either two-thirds support among those specifically voting on the measure or 50% support among all ballots cast in the elections.

County Officers Re-election Amendment
Option	Votes	% of votes on measure	% of all ballots cast
Yes	1,420,011	56.36	41.43
No	1,099,475	43.64	32.08
Total votes	2,519,486	100	73.51
Voter turnout	49.79%		

Amendment 1 results by county Yes: 60–70%; 50–60%; No: 70–80%; 60–70%; 50–60%

==== Illinois General Banking Law Amendment ====
Illinois General Banking Law Amendment was approved by voters as a legislatively referred state statute. It made modified the state's banking law.

Illinois General Banking Law Amendment
Candidate	Votes	%
Yes	755,622	65.83
No	392,260	34.17
Total votes	1,147,882	100
Turnout	{{{votes}}}	22.68%

Amendment 1 results by county Yes: 70–80%; 60–70%; 50–60%; No: 60–70%; 50–60%

==== Judicial Amendment ====
The Judicial Amendment, a legislatively referred constitutional amendment which would amend Article VI of the 1870 Constitution of Illinois, failed to meet either threshold for approval. Changes the amendment would have made included giving broad powers to the Supreme Court of Illinois and creating an appellate court.

In order for constitutional amendments to be passed by voters, they required either two-thirds support among those specifically voting on the measure or 50% support among all ballots cast in the elections.

Judicial Amendment
Option	Votes	% of votes on measure	% of all ballots cast
Yes	1,589,655	64.02	46.38
No	893,503	35.98	26.07
Total votes	2,483,158	100	72.45
Voter turnout	49.07%		

Amendment 1 results by county Yes: 70–80%; 60–70%; 50–60%; No: 70–80%; 60–70%; 50–60%

== Local elections ==
Local elections were held.
