= Ora Smith =

American politician and farmer

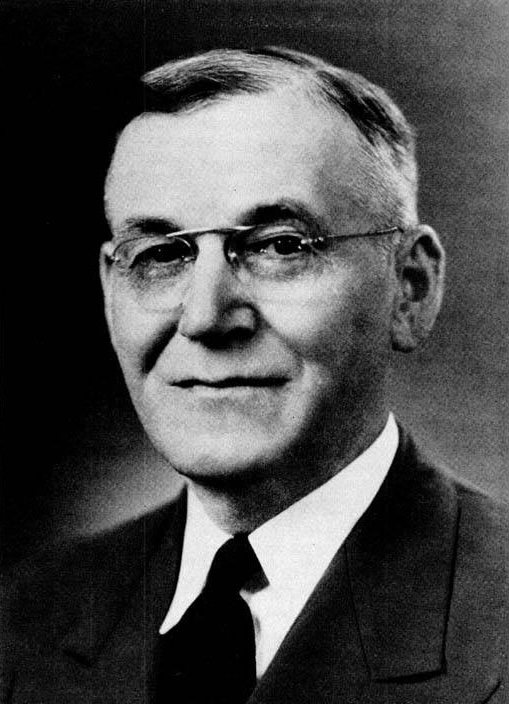
- Smith, circa 1949

55th Treasurer of Illinois
- In office January 10, 1949 – January 8, 1951
- Governor: Adlai E. Stevenson II
- Preceded by: Richard Yates Rowe
- Succeeded by: William G. Stratton

Personal details
- Born: December 3, 1884 New Market, Iowa, U.S.
- Died: July 31, 1965 (aged 80) Monmouth, Illinois, U.S.
- Party: Democratic
- Spouse: Mayme McKee
- Children: 4 daughters 1 son
- Profession: Farmer; Politician; Real estate broker

Ora Ray Smith (December 3, 1884 – July 31, 1965) was an American politician and farmer.

== Early life and career ==
Ora Smith was born December 3, 1884, in New Market, Iowa. His family moved to western Illinois during his childhood and he received his grammar and high school educations in Alexis and Kirkwood, Illinois. He was operated a grocery store with his father Willis J. Smith in Kirkwood and later was the owner-operator of a grocery store in Phelps, Illinois. On October 11, 1905, he married Mayme McKee with whom he would have five children. In 1930, he would join the Masons. Smith owned a 600 acre farm where he raised Hampshire hogs and Aberdeen Angus cattle, an endeavor that would continue during his political career. He served as supervisor in the liquidation of the Illinois Bankers Life Assurance Company's real estate between 1939 and 1944.

== Political career ==
=== Local politics ===
Smith served as an alderman in Kirkwood for two terms. He was a justice of the peace in Biggsville, Illinois for sixteen years. He served for eight years on the board of education for the local high school and also served on the board of education for its elementary schools as well.

=== State politics ===
Smith was elected to the Illinois House of Representatives from the 60th Illinois General Assembly through the 65th Illinois General Assembly. In the 1948 general election, Smith was elected to a two-year term as Illinois Treasurer. As Smith was not allowed to seek reelection to a consecutive term as Treasurer, he ran for the then-elected Clerk of the Illinois Supreme Court. Smith lost the election to Republican incumbent Earle Benjamin Searcy. In a surprise comeback, Smith defeated Republican incumbent Morris E. Muhleman to represent the 53rd district in the Illinois Senate. The 53rd included all or parts of Henderson, Mercer, and Rock Island counties. Smith served a single term encompassing the 71st and 72nd Illinois General Assemblies. In the 1962 general election, Republican candidate Donald D. Carpentier of East Moline defeated Smith by a margin of approximately 900 votes.

== Death ==
Smith died on July 31, 1965, at Monmouth Hospital in Monmouth, Illinois. He was buried in Biggsville.

Party political offices
Preceded by Sam Keys	Democratic nominee for Treasurer of Illinois; 1948	Succeeded by Michael Howlett
