= Illinois State Superintendent =

Head of public education in Illinois

The Illinois State Superintendent of Education, often shortened to State Superintendent, is a statewide government office in the U.S. state of Illinois.

The State Superintendent is nominated by the Governor of Illinois and serves at the pleasure of the Illinois State Board of Education. Since at least 2007, the superintendent is hired at the beginning of a new gubernatorial term after the governor appoints the State Board of Education. The State Superintendent is the chief education officer of the state, and the chief executive officer of the State Board of Education, but is prohibited from being a member of the board.

From 1851 to 1975, the role was an elected statewide office, the Superintendent of Public Instruction; the old name is still referred to in some laws. Following the inaugural appointment of Ninian Wirt Edwards, the office was an elected position. The powers and duties of the Office of the Superintendent of Public Instruction were transferred to the Illinois State Board of Education on January 12, 1975.

The current officeholder is Dr. Tony Sanders.

== List of office holders ==
=== Elected office ===
Name	In office	Political party	Year(s) elected	Note(s)
Ninian Wirt Edwards	1854–1857	Democratic	—N/a	appointed by the governor
William H. Powell	1857–1859	Republican	1856	
Newton Bateman	1859–1863	Republican	1859, 1860	
John P. Brooks	1863–1865	Democratic	1862	
Newton Bateman	1865–1875	Republican	1864, 1866, 1870	
Samuel M. Etter	1875–1879	Democratic	1874	
James P. Slade	1879–1883	Republican	1878	
Henry Raab	1883–1887	Democratic	1882	
Richard Edwards	1887–1891	Republican	1888	
Henry Raab	1891–1895	Democratic	1890	
Samuel Inglis	1895–1898	Republican	1894	died in office on Jan. 23, 1898
Joseph H. Freeman	1898–1899	Republican	—N/a	appointed to fill vacancy left by death by Inglis
Alfred Bayliss	1899–1907	Republican	1898, 1902	
Francis G. Blair	1907–1935	Republican	1906, 1910, 1914, 1918, 1922, 1926, 1930	
John A. Wieland	1935–1943	Democratic	1934, 1938	
Vernon L. Nickell	1943–1959	Republican	1942, 1946; 1950, 1954	
George T. Wilkins	1959–1963	Democratic	1958	
Ray Page	1963–1971	Republican	1962, 1966	
Michael Bakalis	1971–1975	Democratic	1970	

=== Appointed (1975–present) ===
- Joseph Cronin (1975–1980)
- Donald Gill (1981–1984)
- Ted Sanders (1985–1989)
- Robert Leininger (1990–1994)
- Mary Jane Broncato (1994) (temporary)
- Joseph Spagnolo (1994–1998)
- Glen "Max" McGee (1998–2001)
- Ernest Wish (2002) (1 month)
- Respico Vazquez (2002) (temporary)
- Robert Schiller (2002–2004)
- Randy Dunn (2004–2006)
- Christopher Koch (2006–2015)
- Tony Smith (2015-2019)
- Dr. Carmen I. Ayala (2019–2023)
- Tony Sanders (2023-Present)
