= 1950 Illinois elections =

- November 7, 1950

Elections were held in the U.S. state of Illinois on Tuesday, November 7, 1950.

Primaries were held April 11, 1950.

== Election information ==
1950 was a midterm election year in the United States.

=== Turnout ===
In the primary election 1,789,787 ballots were cast (912,563 Democratic and 877,224 Republican).

In the general election 3,731,618 ballots were cast.

== Federal elections ==
=== United States Senate ===
Incumbent Senate Majority Leader Scott W. Lucas, a two-term incumbent Democratic senator, lost reelection to Republican Everett Dirksen.

=== United States House ===
All 26 Illinois seats in the United States House of Representatives were up for election in 1950.

Republicans flipped four Republican-held seats, leaving the Illinois House delegation to consist of 18 Republicans and 8 Democrats.

== State elections ==
=== Treasurer ===
1950 Illinois State Treasurer election
- November 7, 1950
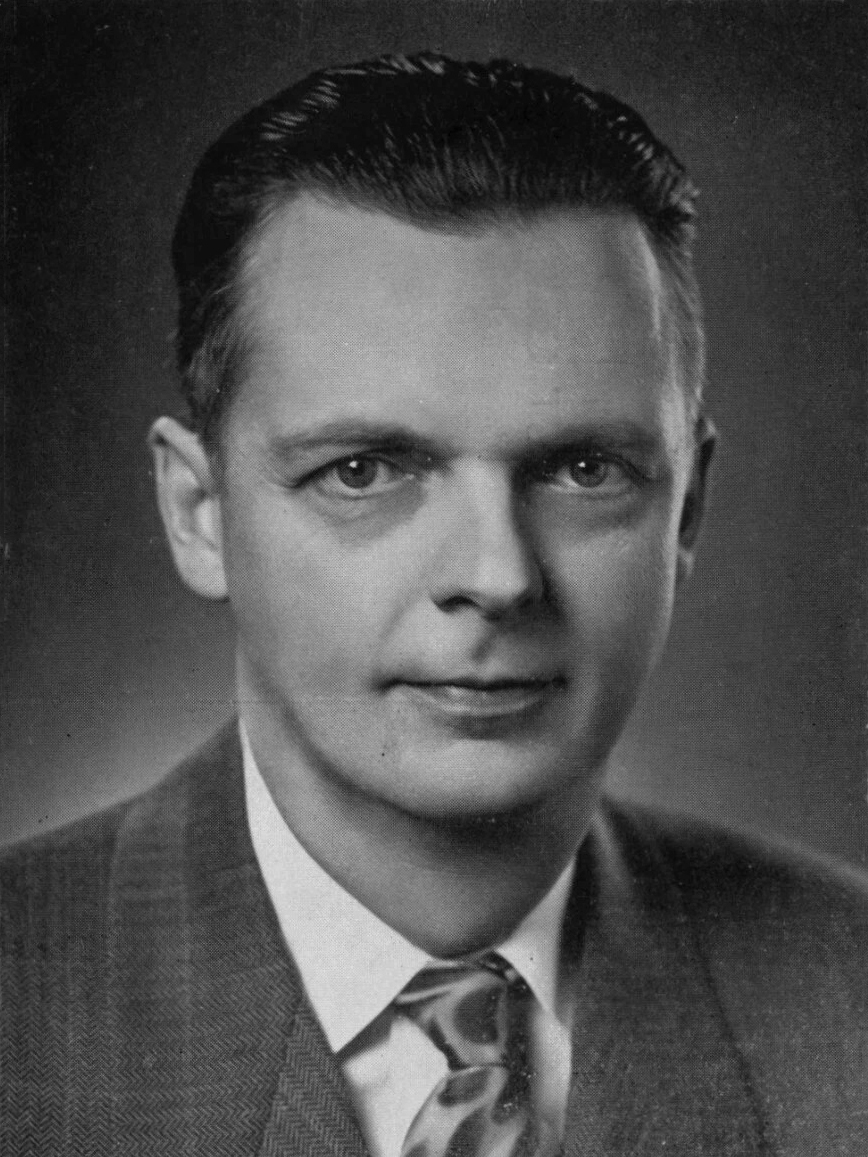

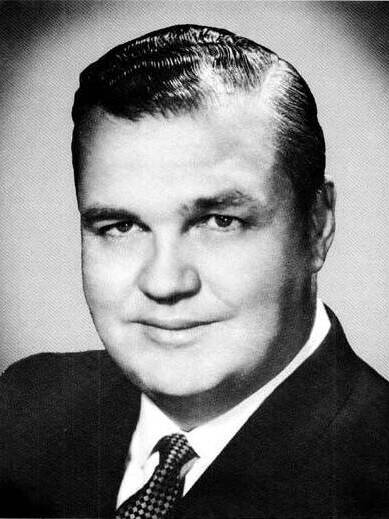
| Nominee | William Stratton | Michael Howlett |
| Party | Republican | Democratic |
| Popular vote | 1,959,734 | 1,568,765 |
| Percentage | 55.34% | 44.30% |
- County results Stratton: 50–60% 60–70% 70–80% 80–90% Howlett: 50–60%
Treasurer before election
Ora Smith
Democratic
Elected Treasurer
William Stratton
Republican

Incumbent first-term Treasurer, Democrat Ora Smith, did not seek reelection, instead running for Clerk of the Supreme Court. Republican William Stratton was elected to succeed him, earning Stratton a second non-consecutive term as Treasurer.

==== Democratic primary ====
Treasurer Democratic primary
| Party | Candidate | Votes | % |
|---|---|---|---|
| Democratic | Michael Howlett | 680,161 | 100 |
| Write-in | Others | 3 | 0.00 |
| Total votes | | 680,164 | 100 |

==== Republican primary ====
Former Illinois Treasurer and congressman William Stratton won the Republican primary. He defeated Cook County Treasurer Louis E. Nelson, former congressman James Simpson Jr., fellow former Illinois Treasurer Warren E. Wright, Chicago alderman Theron W. Merryman, among others.

Treasurer Republican primary
| Party | Candidate | Votes | % |
|---|---|---|---|
| Republican | William G. Stratton | 290,242 | 38.54 |
| Republican | Louis E. Nelson | 214,113 | 28.43 |
| Republican | James Simpson | 126,122 | 16.75 |
| Republican | Warren E. Wright | 61,103 | 8.11 |
| Republican | Theron W. Merryman | 25,194 | 3.35 |
| Republican | Herbert B. Blanchard | 23,556 | 3.13 |
| Republican | Henry J. Samuel | 12,864 | 1.71 |
| Total votes | | 753,194 | 100 |

==== General election ====
Treasurer election
| Party | Candidate | Votes | % |
|---|---|---|---|
| Republican | William G. Stratton | 1,959,734 | 55.34 |
| Democratic | Michael Howlett | 1,568,765 | 44.30 |
| Prohibition | Enoch A. Holtwick | 13,050 | 0.37 |
| Write-in | Others | 9 | 0.00 |
| Total votes | | 3,541,558 | 100 |

=== Superintendent of Public Instruction ===
1950 Illinois Superintendent of Public Instruction election
- November 7, 1950
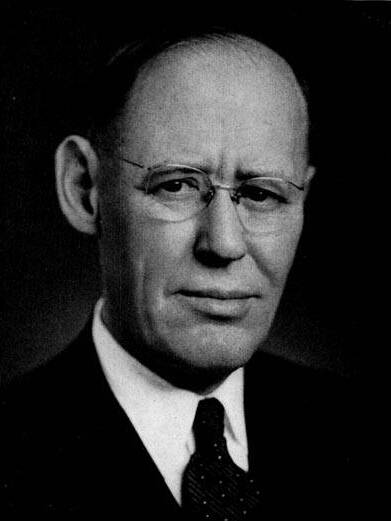

| Nominee | Vernon L. Nickell | C. Hobart Engle |
| Party | Republican | Democratic |
| Popular vote | 1,995,495 | 1,505,257 |
| Percentage | 56.77% | 42.82% |
- County results Nickell: 50–60% 60–70% 70–80% 80–90% Engle: 50–60%
Superintendent before election
Vernon L. Nickell
Republican
Elected Superintendent
Vernon L. Nickell
Republican

Incumbent Superintendent of Public Instruction Vernon L. Nickell, a Republican, was reelected to a third term.

==== Democratic primary ====
Superintendent of Public Instruction Democratic primary
| Party | Candidate | Votes | % |
|---|---|---|---|
| Democratic | C. Hobart Engle | 475,461 | 100 |
| Democratic | Mark A. Peterman | 218,021 | 100 |
| Write-in | Others | 1 | 100 |
| Total votes | | 693,483 | 100 |

==== Republican primary ====
Superintendent of Public Instruction Republican primary
| Party | Candidate | Votes | % |
|---|---|---|---|
| Republican | Vernon L. Nickell (incumbent) | 521,759 | 74.41 |
| Republican | Clyde Franklin Burgess | 179,415 | 25.59 |
| Total votes | | 701,174 | 100 |

==== General election ====
Superintendent of Public Instruction election
| Party | Candidate | Votes | % |
|---|---|---|---|
| Republican | Vernon L. Nickell (incumbent) | 1,995,495 | 56.77 |
| Democratic | C. Hobart Engle | 1,505,257 | 42.82 |
| Prohibition | Henry L. Lundquist | 14,298 | 0.41 |
| Total votes | | 3,515,050 | 100 |

=== Clerk of the Supreme Court ===
1950 Illinois Clerk of the Supreme Court election
- November 7, 1950
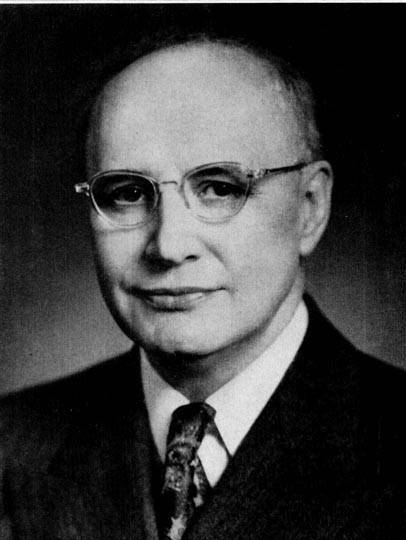

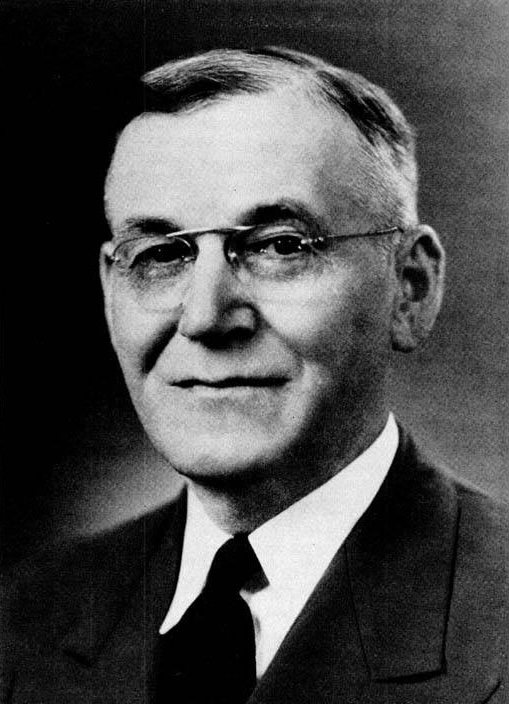
| Nominee | Earle Benjamin Searcy | Ora Smith |
| Party | Republican | Democratic |
| Popular vote | 1,905,704 | 1,584,162 |
| Percentage | 54.42% | 45.23% |
- County results Searcy: 40–50% 50–60% 60–70% 70–80% Smith: 50–60%
Clerk before election
Earle Benjamin Searcy
Republican
Elected Clerk
Earle Benjamin Searcy
Republican

Incumbent Clerk of the Supreme Court Earle Benjamin Searcy, a Republican, was reelected.

==== Democratic primary ====
Illinois Treasurer Ora Smith won the Democratic primary, running unopposed.

Clerk of the Supreme Court Democratic primary
| Party | Candidate | Votes | % |
|---|---|---|---|
| Democratic | Ora Smith | 674,744 | 100 |
| Write-in | Others | 2 | 0.00 |
| Total votes | | 674,746 | 100 |

==== Republican primary ====
Incumbent Earle Benjamin Searcy won the Republican primary, defeating three challengers.

Clerk of the Supreme Court Republican primary
| Party | Candidate | Votes | % |
|---|---|---|---|
| Republican | Earle Benjamin Searcy (incumbent) | 382,131 | 55.90 |
| Republican | William H. Brown | 153,943 | 22.52 |
| Republican | George C. Moffat | 91,004 | 13.31 |
| Republican | Eugene T. Devitt | 56,482 | 8.26 |
| Write-in | Others | 1 | 0.00 |
| Total votes | | 683,561 | 100 |

==== General election ====
Clerk of the Supreme Court election
| Party | Candidate | Votes | % |
|---|---|---|---|
| Republican | Earle Benjamin Searcy (incumbent) | 1,905,704 | 54.42 |
| Democratic | James P. Alexander | 1,584,162 | 45.23 |
| Prohibition | Irving B. Gilbert | 12,291 | 0.35 |
| Write-in | Others | 1 | 0.00 |
| Total votes | | 3,502,158 | 100 |

=== State Senate ===
Seats in the Illinois Senate were up for election in 1950. Republicans flipped control of the chamber.

=== State House of Representatives ===
Seats in the Illinois House of Representatives were up for election in 1950. Republicans remained in control of the chamber.

=== Trustees of University of Illinois ===
1950 Trustees of University of Illinois election
- November 7, 1950

An election was held for three of nine seats for Trustees of University of Illinois.

New Republican members Harold "Red" Grange Wayne A. Johnston, and Herbert B. Megran were elected.

Second-term Democrat Karl A. Meyer lost reelection. Democrat Kenney E. Williamson (serving his first full, and second overall term) also lost reelection. Incumbent first-term Democrat Walter W. McLaughlin was not nominated for reelection, with former member Harold Pogue nominated instead.

Trustees of the University of Illinois election
| Party | Candidate | Votes | % |
|---|---|---|---|
| Republican | Harold "Red" Grange | 1,945,936 | 18.72 |
| Republican | Wayne A. Johnston | 1,895,867 | 18.24 |
| Republican | Herbert B. Megran | 1,852,747 | 17.83 |
| Democratic | Dr. Karl A. Meyer (incumbent) | 1,648,772 | 15.86 |
| Democratic | Kenney E. Williamson (incumbent) | 1,533,087 | 14.75 |
| Democratic | Harold Pogue | 1,517,449 | 14.60 |
| Prohibition | Olive R. Wilson | 12,446½ | 0.12 |
| Prohibition | Edward N. Himmel | 12,382½ | 0.12 |
| Prohibition | Albert F. Schersten | 11,766½ | 0.11 |
| Total votes | | 10,393,858 | 100 |

=== Judicial elections ===
On April 11, two special elections were held, one to fill a vacancy of the Circuit Court of Cook County and one to fill a vacancy on the Superior Court of Cook County.

=== Ballot measure ===
One measure was put before voters in 1950, a legislatively referred constitutional amendment.

In order to be approved, it required approval equal to a majority of voters voting in the entire general election.

==== Illinois Gateway Amendment ====
The Illinois Gateway Amendment, a legislatively referred constitutional amendment to Section 2 of Article XIV of the Constitution, was approved by voters. It made it so that the legislature would be able to propose modifications of up to three articles of the constitution per session, and also made it so that future constitutional amendments would require either a two-thirds vote of the voters voting on the question or a majority of voter voting in the election.

Illinois Gateway Amendment
| Option | Votes on measure | % of all ballots cast |
|---|---|---|
| Yes | 2,512,323 | 67.33 |
| No | 735,903 | 19.72 |
| Total votes | 3,248,226 | 87.05 |

Amendment results by county Yes: 80–90%; 70–80%; 60–70%; 50–60%; No: 50–60%

== Local elections ==
Local elections were held. Results happened.
