= William J. Scott (Illinois politician) =

American politician

William Scott
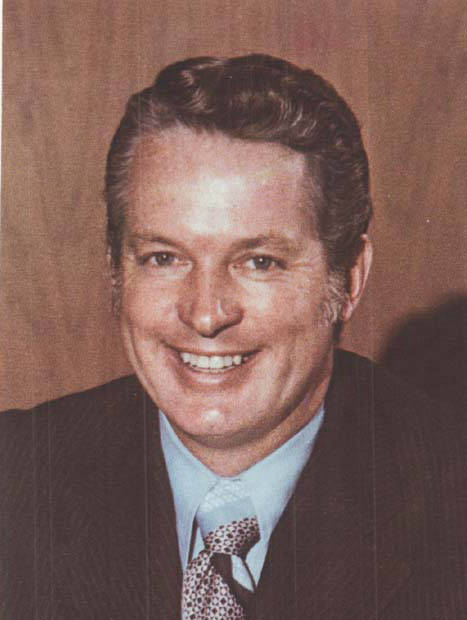
- Scott, circa 1976

36th Illinois Attorney General
- In office January 13, 1969 – July 29, 1980
- Governor: Richard B. Ogilvie; Dan Walker; Jim Thompson
- Preceded by: William G. Clark
- Succeeded by: Tyrone C. Fahner

62nd Treasurer of Illinois
- In office January 14, 1963 – January 9, 1967
- Governor: Otto Kerner Jr.
- Preceded by: Francis S. Lorenz
- Succeeded by: Adlai Stevenson III

Personal details
- Born: November 11, 1926 Chicago, Illinois, U.S.
- Died: June 22, 1986 (aged 59) Palos Heights, Illinois, U.S.
- Party: Republican

William J. Scott (November 11, 1926 – June 22, 1986) was an American lawyer and politician. A member of the Republican Party, he served as Treasurer of Illinois from 1963 until 1967 and as Illinois Attorney General from 1969 until his disqualification from office following his conviction of a tax crime.

== Biography ==
Born in Chicago, Illinois, Scott served in the United States Naval Air Corps during World War II. He was assigned to the University of Pennsylvania where he earned his undergraduate degree. He then received his law degree from Chicago–Kent College of Law in 1950 and then practiced law. In 1959, he helped the United States Government with a crackdown on organized crime. He then became vice president of a bank.

In 1962, he was elected Illinois State Treasurer, as a Republican, and served until 1967.

Elected in 1968, he served as Illinois Attorney General until his resignation in 1980.

In 1980, while on trial for understating his 1972 United States income tax, he unsuccessfully sought the Republican nomination for U.S. Senate.

He was convicted the day after his defeat in the polls. In 1982, after losing an appeal in the United States Supreme Court, he was sentenced to a year and a day in prison. He served seven months of this sentence before being paroled.

He died at his home, in Palos Heights, Illinois, of a heart attack.

== Notes ==
Party political offices
Preceded by Warren Wright	Republican nominee for Illinois Treasurer; 1962	Succeeded by Harris Rowe
Preceded by Elroy C. Sandquist	Republican nominee for Attorney General of Illinois; 1968, 1972, 1976, 1978	Succeeded by Tyrone C. Fahner
Legal offices
Preceded by Francis S. Lorenz	Treasurer of Illinois; 1963–1967	Succeeded by Adlai Stevenson III
Preceded by William G. Clark	Attorney General of Illinois; 1969–1980	Succeeded by Tyrone C. Fahner
