= Theodore A. Jones =

- Born: November 14, 1912; Pueblo, Colorado, US
- Died: April 12, 2001 (aged 88); Chicago, Illinois, US
- Occupations: Businessman and teacher
- Known for: Director of Illinois Department of Revenue, President of the National Insurance Association and various government posts

Theodore A. Jones (1912–2001) was a leading insurance industry figure who held important positions within both the public and private sectors.

== Background ==
Jones was born in Pueblo, Colorado on November 14, 1912. In 1933, he graduated from the University of Illinois with a bachelor's degree in accounting and economics. He went on to become only the third African American to become a CPA in Illinois.

== Career ==
He served as executive vice president of Supreme Life Insurance Company of America and went on to serve as president of the National Insurance Association, the latter a trade organization representing 48 black-owned and operated insurance companies.

In the early 1960s, Jones was appointed by President John F. Kennedy to the Federal Committee on Equal Opportunity in Housing. President Lyndon B. Johnson appointed him as Midwest Great Lakes Regional Director of the Federal Anti-Poverty Program.

From 1963 to 1971, he served as a trustee for his alma mater, the University of Illinois. He was appointed a trustee in 1963, and subsequently was elected to a full 6-year term in 1964

Jones also served as director of the Illinois Department of Revenue and as general manager of radio station WGRT (later WJPC) in Chicago.
