= St. Nicholas Hotel (Springfield, Illinois) =

- U.S. National Register of Historic Places
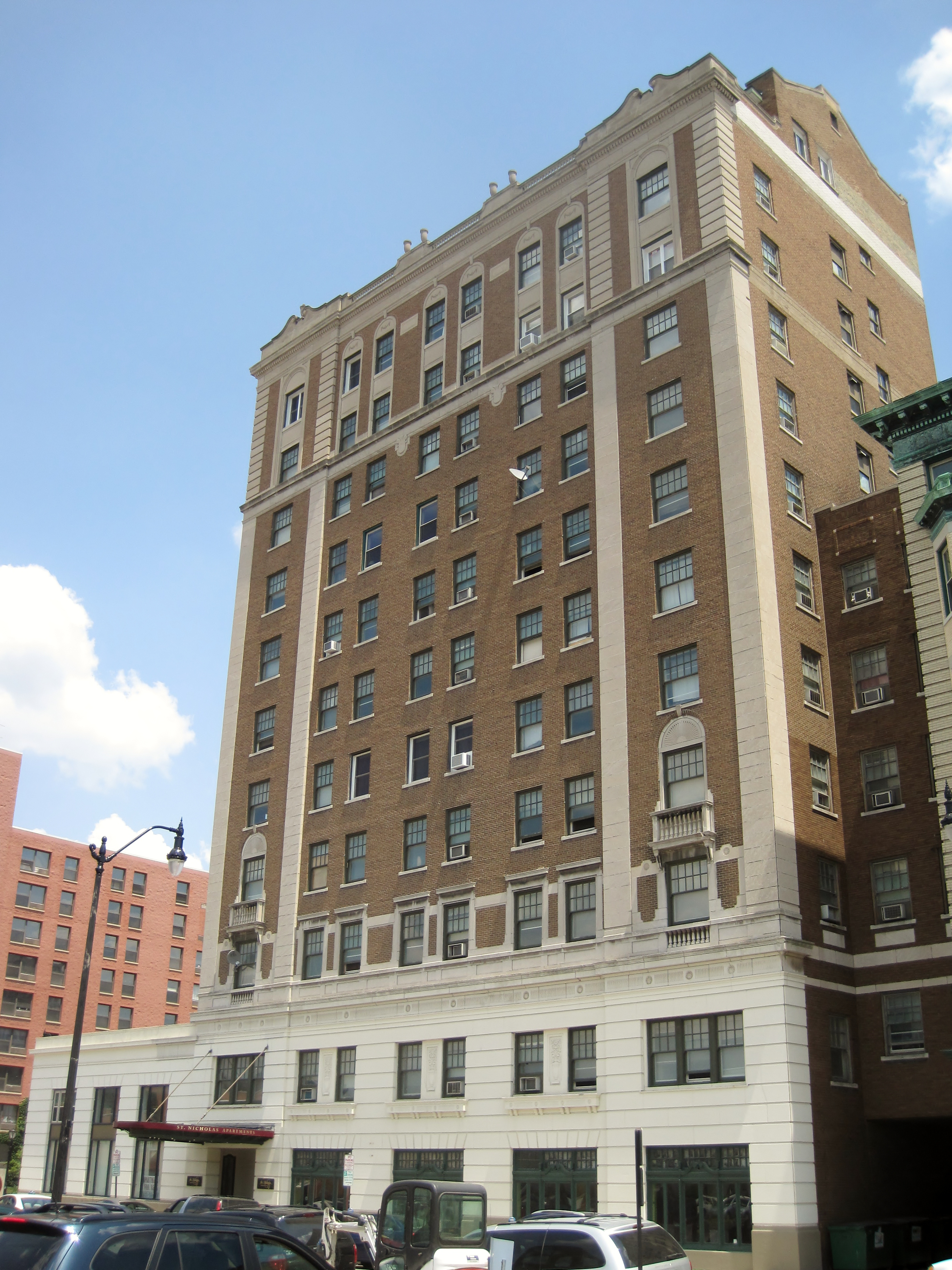

- Location within Illinois Location within the United States
- Location: 400 E. Jefferson St., Springfield, Illinois
- Coordinates: 39°48′9″N 89°39′1″W
- Area: less than one acre
- Built: 1910; 1924
- Architect: H. L. Stevens & Co.
- Architectural style: Georgian Revival
- NRHP reference No.: 83000336
- Added to NRHP: February 10, 1983

The St. Nicholas Hotel is a historic hotel building located at 400 E. Jefferson St. in Springfield, Illinois, US.

The original building of the St. Nicholas Hotel was constructed in 1855. An annex was built on the hotel in 1910, and the current main building was constructed in 1924. The Georgian Revival main building was designed by the New York City architectural firm H.L. Stevens and Company. When the current main building opened, it was the second-tallest building in Springfield after the State Capitol.

During sessions of the Illinois General Assembly, the St. Nicholas Hotel became a meeting place for Illinois politicians, who often conducted political business within the building. The hotel has hosted many notable visitors to Springfield, including three U.S. Presidents: Harry S. Truman, Dwight D. Eisenhower, and John F. Kennedy.

Paul Powell lived in the St. Nicholas Hotel during his term as the Illinois Secretary of State. After his death in 1970, the executor of Powell's will found $750,000 ($6.22 million in present-day terms) in cash stored in shoeboxes, briefcases, and strongboxes in Powell's suite, room 546 of the hotel. As the money greatly exceeded Powell's salary, which was at the most $30,000 per year, a federal investigation examined Powell's behavior while in office. The investigation determined that Powell had acquired the money via illegal cash bribes and led to the imprisonment of several state contractors.

The hotel was added to the National Register of Historic Places on February 10, 1983. It is the only remaining hotel in Springfield which dates from the 1920s or earlier.

The hotel is no longer in operation, having switched over to apartments. The building is now referred to as the St. Nicholas Apartments.
