= Tyrone C. Fahner =

American lawyer and politician (1942–2024)

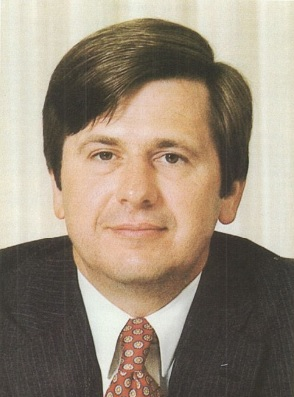
- Official portrait, c. 1981

37th Attorney General of Illinois
- In office July 29, 1980 – January 12, 1983
- Governor: Jim Thompson
- Preceded by: William Scott
- Succeeded by: Neil Hartigan

Personal details
- Born: Tyrone Clarence Fahner; November 18, 1942 Detroit, Michigan, U.S.
- Died: September 16, 2024 (aged 81) Northfield, Illinois, U.S.
- Party: Republican
- Education: University of Michigan (BA); Wayne State University (JD); Northwestern University (LLM)

Tyrone Clarence Fahner (/ˈfeɪnər/ FAY-nər; November 18, 1942 – September 16, 2024) was an American lawyer and politician. A member of the Republican Party, he served as Illinois Attorney General from 1980 until 1983. He was appointed to the position by Governor James R. Thompson after the incumbent, William Scott, had been convicted of a tax crime, which disqualified him from office.

== Early life and education ==
Tyrone Clarence Fahner was born on November 18, 1942, in Detroit, Michigan, to Warren Fahner, a Chrysler employee, and Alma (Newman) Fahner, who worked at Michigan Bell as a telephone operator.

Fahner graduated from Denby High School in 1961 and became a student at the University of Michigan at Ann Arbor, where he was a member of the Delta Tau Delta fraternity. He received his B.A. from the University of Michigan in 1965, his J.D. from Wayne State University Law School in 1968, and an LL.M. from Northwestern University School of Law in 1971.

== Career ==
In the early 1970s, after a short period in private practice, Fahner became an Assistant U.S. Attorney in the U.S. Attorney's Office for the Northern District of Illinois, serving under then-U.S. Attorney James R. (Jim) Thompson. Fahner left that office to work for the law firm of Freeman, Rothe, Freeman & Salzman in Chicago from 1975 to 1977.

When Thompson was elected governor of Illinois in 1977 he selected Fahner to serve as his director of the Illinois Department of Law Enforcement. Fahner held the post until 1979.

In 1980, Thompson appointed Fahner to serve as Illinois Attorney General, filling the vacancy created after Attorney General William J. Scott was convicted of tax evasion. Fahner ran for a full term as attorney general, but was defeated by Democratic candidate Neil Hartigan in the 1982 election.

After leaving office in 1983, Fahner returned to private practice, joining the law firm Mayer Brown LLP as a partner. Fahner served on the firm's management committee from 1985 to 2007, and was its co-chairman from 1998 to 2001 and its chairman from 2001 to 2007.

In 2015, Fahner wrote a letter to U.S. District Judge Thomas M. Durkin urging a lenient sentence for former House Speaker Dennis Hastert, who had pleaded guilty to unlawfully structuring bank withdrawals to avoid reporting requirements. (Hastert had made secret payments to a man whom he had sexually abused decades earlier, when Hastert was a high school teacher and coach.) Fahner referred to Hastert as "a kind, strong, principled, and unselfish man" and wrote: "I urge the court to permit him to live the rest of his life in freedom with his family and friends, and all those who love and admire him." Fahner subsequently said that it was a mistake for him to use Mayer Brown firm letterhead for the letter.

In the 2016 Republican Party presidential primaries, Fahner was a delegate pledged to the presidential campaign of Jeb Bush.

=== Memberships and board service ===
In 1988, Ronald Reagan appointed Fahner to the Board of Foreign Scholarships, for a term ending in 1991.

Fahner joined the board of trustees of the Shedd Aquarium in 2004, and became the chairman of the board in 2012. Fahner was president of the civic committee of the Commercial Club of Chicago.

== Personal life and death ==
Fahner was married to Anne Fahner. The family lived in Evanston for many years before moving to Northfield in 2014.

Fahner died in Northfield on September 16, 2024, at the age of 81.

Party political offices
Preceded by William J. Scott	Republican nominee for Attorney General of Illinois; 1982	Succeeded by James T. Ryan
Legal offices
Preceded by William J. Scott	Attorney General of Illinois; 1980–1983	Succeeded by Neil Hartigan
