= Samuel M. Inglis =

Samuel M. Inglis was a nineteenth century American educator.

He played significant roles in the development of education in Illinois, including that of Illinois Superintendent of Public Instruction. With this position, he was an ex-officio member of several public post-secondary educational facilities of Illinois, including Eastern Illinois Normal School.

Inglis was born in Marietta, Pennsylvania, on August 15, 1840. His early education took place in Ohio public schools. His family moved to Illinois, where he graduated from Mendota Collegiate Institute with first honors in 1861. In about 1864, he joined the 104th Illinois Infantry. In 1887, he married Anna Louise Jackson, a Hillsboro native who died in 1892. He married Louise Baumberger of Greenville three years afterwards.

In addition to serving as State Superintendent of Public Instruction, he was a trustee of Northern Illinois Normal School as Chair of Mathematics and, later, Chair of Literature, Rhetoric, and Elocution. He was an Illinois delegate to the National Convention of Educators.

He was elected president of Eastern Illinois State Normal School or what is known today as Eastern Illinois University on April 12, 1898. He died on June 1, 1898, on vacation in Kenosha, Wisconsin, before his official duties would have commenced in September 1899.
