= Louis E. Beckman Jr. =

American politician and businessman

Louis E. Beckman, Jr. (February 2, 1914 – October 19, 1992) was an American politician and businessman.

Born in Kankakee, Illinois, Beckman went to the Kankakee public schools and then graduated from the University of Illinois in 1935. He served in the United States Army during World War II and was commissioned a lieutenant colonel. He was in the real estate and banking business. Beckman served in the Illinois House of Representatives from 1951 to 1959 and was a Republican. In 1958, Beckman for the Republican nomination for the Illinois State Treasurer and lost. Beckman died at his home in Kankakee, Illinois. His father Louis E. Beckman also served in the Illinois General Assembly.
