= Louis E. Beckman =

American politician

Louis E. Beckman (May 20, 1876 – January 7, 1946) was a businessman and politician.

Born in Kankakee, Illinois, Beckman went to Kankakee parochial and public schools; he also went to the Kankakee Business College. Beckman was involved in banking business and was president of the First Trust and Saving Bank in Kankakee. He served as mayor of Kankakee, Illinois and was a Republican. Beckman served in the Illinois House of Representatives from 1925 to 1929. He served as mayor of Kankakee, Illinois and on the Kankakee County, Illinois Board of Commissioners. Beckman then served in the Illinois Senate from 1937 until his death.

He died at his home in Kankakee, Illinois from a heart attack. His son Louis E. Beckman Jr. also served in the Illinois General Assembly.
