= Newton Bateman =

American politician (1822–1897)

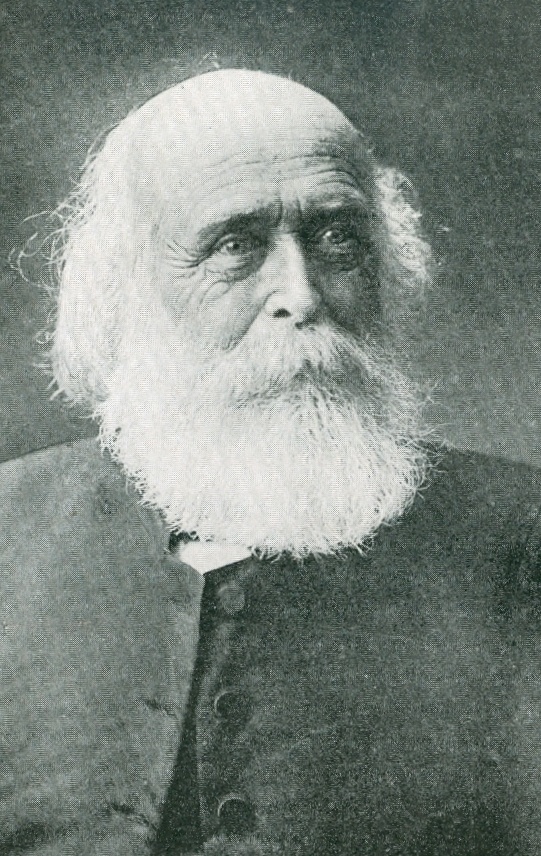

3rd Illinois Superintendent of Public Instruction
- In office 1859–1863
- Governor: John Wood
- Preceded by: William H. Powell
- Succeeded by: John P. Brooks
- In office 1865–1875
- Governor: Richard J. Oglesby; John M. Palmer; John L. Beveridge
- Preceded by: John P. Brooks
- Succeeded by: Samuel M. Etter

Personal details
- Born: July 27, 1822 Bridgeton, New Jersey, US
- Died: October 21, 1897 (aged 75) Jacksonville, Illinois, US
- Party: Republican
- Education: Illinois College

Newton Bateman (July 27, 1822 – October 21, 1897) was an American academic, educational administrator, and editor from New Jersey. Raised in poverty, Bateman came with his family to Illinois at a young age then earned his way into Illinois College. After graduating, he again struggled to make ends meet before an anonymous donor sent him a large sum of money. He used it to establish a private school in St. Louis, Missouri. He was later elected superintendent of schools in Morgan County, Illinois, then served as Illinois Superintendent of Public Instruction (1859–63, 1865–1875). He resigned to become president of Knox College. Late in his life, he published an encyclopedia of the state. Bateman was an associate of Abraham Lincoln and is the source of a controversial account of his religious views.

== Biography ==
Newton Bateman was born in Bridgeton, New Jersey on July 27, 1822. His father was a weaver who struggled with the growth of industrialization. He moved the family west when Bateman was eleven. His mother died of Asiatic cholera on their way to their new home in Meredosia, Illinois. The family continued to struggle through poverty. To help support the family, Bateman took a job as an errand-boy for a prominent jurist in Jacksonville, Illinois. He fell in love with the jurist's daughter, but was not of proper social class to ask her hand in marriage. However, this inspired Bateman to pursue an education.

Bateman cut timber to raise money for schooling. He then attended the preparatory department of Illinois College before matriculating there in 1839. Bateman's classmates appreciated his sense of humor. He taught his first class while studying there, a Latin course for the preparatory department. Bateman graduated in June 1843, intending to become a Presbyterian minister. He briefly studied at Lane Seminary in Cincinnati, Ohio, but was forced to drop out due to a lack of funds. He then worked for a book agency, selling maps, but again fell into poverty. An anonymous donor sent Bateman some money and he used the funds to build a private school in northern St. Louis, Missouri, in 1845. Although he continued to struggle financially, he earned a reputation as a local leader in education.

In 1847, the University of Missouri hired Bateman as a professor of mathematics. When Jacksonville, Illinois, established a free school in its west district in 1861, it named Bateman its superintendent. He soon became school commissioner of Morgan County, Illinois, in Jacksonville. While there, he joined the state teacher's association and advocated for the creation of the Illinois Industrial University and the Illinois State Normal University. He was named vice president of the Illinois Teachers' Association in 1855 and edited its publication, the Illinois Teacher. He became the publications sole editor in 1858 and was named superintendent of the Jacksonville Female Academy.

The Republican Party nominated Bateman for the office of Illinois Superintendent of Public Instruction. Bateman was elected and took office in January 1859. In his first term, he ensured that new schools must receive a state certificate to open. He was re-elected to another two-year term in 1861. He was defeated in a re-election bid in 1862, but was successful in another run in 1864. He would then hold the office for another decade. In his final year, he published an 83-page report suggesting a selection of books for school libraries.

Bateman was offered the presidency of several colleges during his terms as state superintendent. In 1875, he agreed to assume the presidency of Knox College in Galesburg, Illinois. He led the school for the next eighteen years. From 1877 to 1891, he was a member of the Illinois Board of Health. In failing health, he resigned in 1893, receiving a position as professor emeritus of the school. He taught only a singly class, spending most of his time compiling the Historical Encyclopedia of Illinois.

Bateman married Sarah Dayton in 1850, though she died on May 16, 1857. They had a son, Clifford Rush, and one daughter. He married Annie N. Tyler in 1859; they had two daughters together and adopted an orphaned niece. She died in 1877. Bateman died in Galesburg on October 21, 1897. He was buried there in Hope Cemetery.

He is the namesake of Newton Bateman Elementary School in Chicago, Illinois.

== Bateman and Lincoln ==
Newton Bateman was a friend and political ally of Abraham Lincoln. When Lincoln would visit the Illinois State Capitol in Springfield, Illinois, on political business, he would stay in the room next to the superintendent's. Lincoln jokingly referred to Bateman as his "little friend", as Bateman was short and Lincoln was tall. The two became close during a seven-month stay by Lincoln in 1860 during his presidential candidacy. An interaction between Bateman in Lincoln is of interest to biographers because of the way it portrays Lincoln's religious beliefs. When Josiah Gilbert Holland was seeking material for his Life of Lincoln, he interviewed Bateman.

According to Bateman, Lincoln asked him into his office one day to discuss a political canvass of Springfield. The canvass showed the intended votes of all Springfield voters, and Lincoln was vexed:

Here are twenty-three, ministers, of different denominations, and all of them are against me but three; are here are a great many prominent members of the churches, a very large majority of whom are against me. Mr. Bateman, I am not Christian—God knows I could be one—but I have carefully read the Bible, and I do not so understand this book [the New Testament]. These men will know that I am for freedom in the territories, freedom everywhere as far as the Constitution and laws will permit, and that my opponents are for slavery. They know this, and yet, with this book in their hands, in the light of which human bondage cannot live a moment, they are going to vote against me. I do not understand it at all.

Lincoln paused, then paced around the room. He then continued:

I know there is a God, and that He hates injustice and slavery. I see the storm coming, and I know that His hand is in it. If He has a place and work for me—and I think He has—I believe I am ready. I am nothing, but truth is everything. I know I am right because I know liberty is right, for Christ teaches it, and Christ is God. I have told them that a house divided against itself cannot stand, and so Christ and reason say the same; and they will find it so. Douglas don't care whether slavery is voted up or voted down, but God cares, and humanity cares, and I care; and with God's help I shall not fail. I may not see the end; but it will come, and I shall be vindicated; and these men will find that they have not read their Bibles aright.

Holland's Life of Lincoln used this story to color Lincoln as a religious man. However, as soon as 1872, the story faced criticism. Ward Hill Lamon, a close associate of Lincoln, dismissed the story as inconsistent with Lincoln's character. Likewise, Lincoln's former law partner William Herndon found the story hard to believe even though he approved of the rest of Holland's biography. Herndon sought out Bateman and the two discussed the interview with Holland. Bateman repudiated that Lincoln claimed that "Christ is God", but supported Holland's interpretation. Herndon wrote about the discussion:

On my word, the world may take for granted that Holland is wrong; that he does not state Mr. Lincoln's views correctly. Mr. Bateman, if correctly represented in Holland's Life of Lincoln, is the only man, the sole and only man, who dare say that Lincoln believed in Jesus as the Christ of God, as the Christian world represents.

Bateman largely maintained a public silence on the issue. When Isaac N. Arnold asked Bateman about the incident when writing his The Life of Abraham Lincoln, Bateman replied that it was "substantially correct" without further elaboration. Bateman's interview with Lincoln is generally not included in modern biographies.
