= Joseph D. Lohman =

American educator and politician

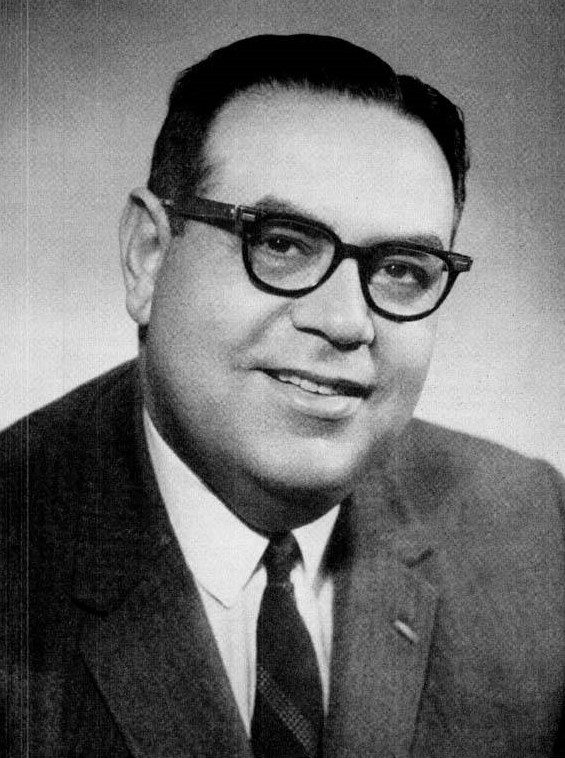
- Lohman, circa 1959

60th Treasurer of Illinois
- In office January 12, 1959 – September 1, 1961
- Governor: William G. Stratton; Otto Kerner Jr.
- Preceded by: Elmer J. Hoffman
- Succeeded by: Francis S. Lorenz

Cook County Sheriff
- In office 1954–1958
- Preceded by: John E. Babb
- Succeeded by: Frank G. Sain

Personal details
- Born: January 31, 1910; Denver, Colorado, U.S.
- Died: April 26, 1968 (aged 58); Walnut Creek, California, U.S.
- Political party: Democratic

Joseph D. Lohman (January 31, 1910 – April 26, 1968) was an American educator and politician.

Born in Denver, Colorado, Lohman received his bachelor's degree from University of Denver and his master's degree from University of Wisconsin–Madison, and went to University of Chicago. He taught sociology at University of Chicago, American University, and University of Wisconsin–Madison. Illinois Governor Adlai Stevenson appointed Lohman chairman of the Illinois Parole Board in 1949. In 1954, Lohman was elected sheriff of Cook County, Illinois as a Democrat and then in 1958, Lohman was elected Illinois Treasurer. In 1961, Lohman resigned as Illinois Treasurer and was appointed dean of the school of criminology at University of California, Berkeley. He died in Walnut Creek, California of a heart ailment at age 58.

== Notes ==
Party political offices
Preceded by Arthur L. Hellyer	Democratic nominee for Treasurer of Illinois; 1958	Succeeded by Francis S. Lorenz
