= Francis S. Lorenz =

American judge (1914–2008)

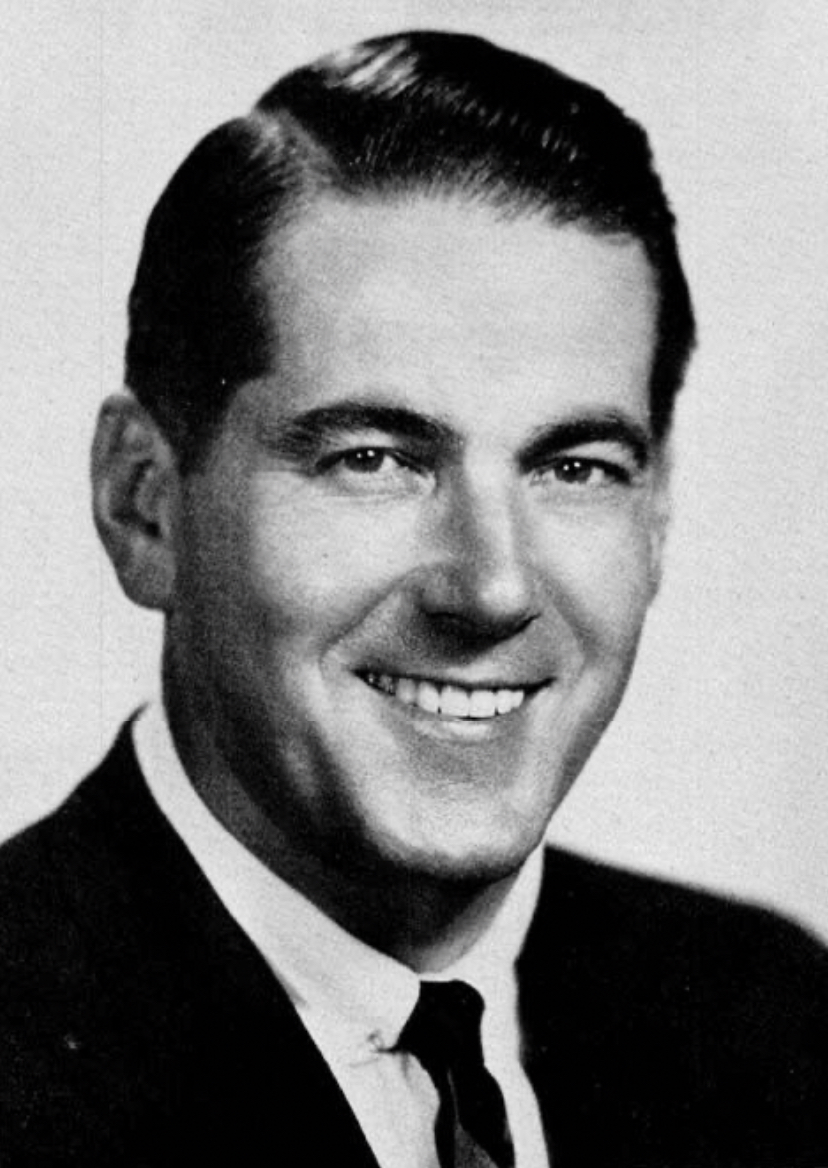
- Official portrait, 1961

Judge of the Illinois Appellate Court
- In office 1970–1992
- Succeeded by: William Cousins

61st Treasurer of Illinois
- In office September 1, 1961 – January 14, 1963
- Appointed by: Otto Kerner Jr.
- Preceded by: Joseph D. Lohman
- Succeeded by: William J. Scott

Cook County Treasurer
- In office December 1958 – September 1, 1961
- Preceded by: Herbert C. Paschen
- Succeeded by: Bernard J. Korzen

Clerk of the Superior Court of Cook County
- In office December 1956 – December 1958

Personal details
- Born: September 4, 1914 Chicago, Illinois, U.S.
- Died: June 26, 2008 (aged 93) Barrington, Illinois, U.S.
- Party: Democratic

Francis Stanley Lorenz (September 4, 1914 – June 26, 2008) was an American jurist and politician.

== Early life and career ==
Born in Chicago, Illinois, Lorenz received his bachelor's degree in law from DePaul University College of Law and was admitted to the Illinois bar. He served as an assistant corporation counsel for the city of Chicago in the 1940s.

== Politics ==
He was elected Clerk of the Superior Court of Cook County in 1956 and Cook County Treasurer in 1958 and was a Democrat. In 1961, Illinois Governor Otto Kerner, Jr. appointed Lorenz Illinois Treasurer to fill a vacancy, when Joseph D. Lohman resigned from office to take a teaching position. In 1962, Lorenz was an unsuccessful candidate for election, losing to Republican nominee and banker William J. Scott. After Lorenz's loss, Kerner appointed Lorenz director of the Illinois Department of Public Works and Buildings effective January 1963. He served as director until 1967.

== Judicial career ==
In 1970, Lorenz was elected a judge of the Illinois Appellate Court. From 1970 to 1992, Lorenz served in that position in the fifth division. In 1980, Lorenz was an unsuccessful candidate for the Democratic nomination for Illinois Supreme Court, losing to fellow Appellate Court Judge Seymour Simon. While a justice, he was a member of the Illinois Courts Commission and as a member of the 1st District Appellate Court's executive committee. In 1992, William Cousins succeeded Lorenz as an appellate court judge.

== Death ==
He died in Barrington, Illinois of pneumonia at age 93.

== Notes ==
Party political offices
Preceded by Joseph D. Lohman	Democratic nominee for Treasurer of Illinois; 1962	Succeeded by Adlai Stevenson III
Preceded by William G. Clark	Democratic nominee for Attorney General of Illinois; 1968	Succeeded by Thomas G. Lyons
