= Wayne A. Johnston =

Wayne A. Johnston (November 19, 1897 - December 1967) was president of Illinois Central Railroad (IC) from 1945 to 1966. When he stepped down from the presidency of the railroad, he was named Chairman of the Board for IC, a position he held for a year. In 1967, he was also named president of the University of Illinois Board of Trustees, of which he had been a member since 1951 (having won election to the board in 1950, 1956, and 1962.

== Background ==
In 1949, Johnston served as the Treasurer for the Chicago Railroad Fair.

From April 1949 until September 2009, Illinois Central's classification yard in Memphis, Tennessee was named after him. Johnston Yard was reconfigured and modernized in September 2009 and renamed Harrison Yard after CN CEO E. Hunter Harrison, who would retire at the end of the year.

Preceded by John L. Beven	President of Illinois Central Railroad; 1945 – 1966	Succeeded by William B. Johnson
Preceded by	President of the University of Illinois Board of Trustees; 1967	Succeeded by
