= William H. Chamberlain =

American politician

30th Secretary of State of Illinois
- In office 1964–1965
- Governor: Otto Kerner, Jr.
- Preceded by: Charles F. Carpentier
- Succeeded by: Paul Powell

Personal details
- Born: January 22, 1931 Sangamon County, Illinois
- Died: 1973

William H. Chamberlain (January 22, 1931 – October 12, 1972) was a Democratic politician who was elected to various Illinois state offices.

Born in Sangamon County, Illinois, Chamberlain was the delegate to the Democratic National Convention from Illinois in 1964. From 1964 to 1965 he was the Secretary of State of Illinois, thereafter serving as circuit judge until his death in 1972.

He was a member of the Knights of Columbus, Urban League, and American Judicature Society. On his death, he was interred at the Calvary Cemetery in Springfield, Illinois.

There is a baseball field named after Judge Chamberlain in Springfield, Illinois.

Political offices
Preceded by Charles F. Carpentier	Secretary of State of Illinois; 1964–1965	Succeeded by Paul Powell
