= Fae Searcy =

American politician

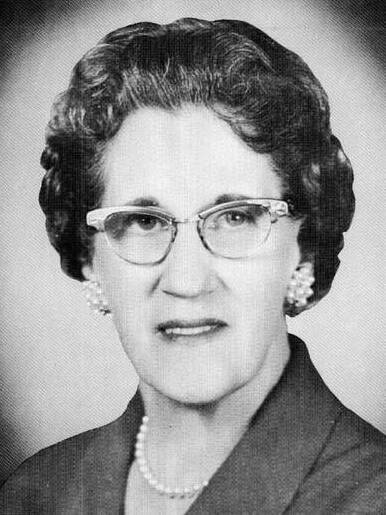
- Searcy, circa 1961

Clerk of the Supreme Court of Illinois
- In office April 13, 1955 – March 23, 1968
- Preceded by: Earle Benjamin Searcy
- Succeeded by: Justin Taft; Clell Woods (acting)

Personal details
- Born: Fae Isenberg
- Died: March 23, 1968 (aged 75)
- Party: Republican
- Spouse: Earle Benjamin Searcy
- Children: 2

Fae Searcy (née Isenberg) was an American politician who served as clerk of the Supreme Court of Illinois. She was the first woman to hold a statewide elected office in Illinois. First appointed in a widow's succession following her husband's death in office, Searcy won election to two full terms.

== Biography ==
Searcy was born in Shelby County, Illinois as Fae Isenberg. She attended public school in Shelbyville.

Searcy attended Oberlin College, and graduated from the Hinshaw Conservatory of Music in Chicago.

She married Earle Benjamin Searcy in 1917, taking his surname. The Searcys would be parents to daughter Barbara Jane Searcy Damewood and son Earle B. Searcy.

Searcy's husband became a politician. She joined him frequently on campaign trips, and was involved in Republican Party women's clubs.

=== Clerk of the Supreme Court of Illinois ===
In 1955, Searcy's husband, serving in the statewide elected office of clerk of the Illinois Supreme Court, died in office of a heart attack. On April 13, 1955, in an instance of widow's succession, she was appointed by the court to fill the vacant office, becoming the first woman to fill a statewide elected office in Illinois. She won election as a Republican to a full term in 1956. Searcy was reelected to an additional full term in 1962.

=== Death ===
On March 23, 1968, Searcy died at the age of 75, after having ailed from a lingering illness. Searcy still placed second out of three candidates in the June 1968 Republican primary election for the office of Clerk of the Illinois Supreme Court, which she had already filed to appear on the ballot for prior to her death. Deputy Supreme Court Clerk Clell Woods was appointed Clerk Pro Tern by the Supreme Court and served until Justin Taft, who was elected in the November election, took office in December.
