= Donald D. Carpentier =

American businessman and politician

Donald Dee Carpentier (January 21, 1931 – October 19, 1982) was an American businessman and politician. In 1968, he unsuccessfully ran for Illinois secretary of state as the Republican nominee.

== Biography ==
He was born on January 21, 1931, in Moline, Illinois. Carpentier went to the Moline public and parochial schools. He then went to St. Ambrose University. Carpentier owned a drive-in theatre and a laundromat. He was also in the insurance business. His father Charles F. Carpentier also served in the Illinois General Assembly and served as Illinois Secretary of State. Donald Carpentier was convicted in the United States District Court for bribery involving the ready-mixed concrete business and was sentenced to three years in prison. He died on October 19, 1982.

== Notes ==
Party political offices
Preceded by Elmer J. Hoffman	Republican nominee for Secretary of State of Illinois; 1968	Succeeded by Edmund J. Kucharski
