= 1962 Illinois elections =

- November 6, 1962
- Turnout: 74.67%

Elections were held in Illinois on Tuesday, November 6, 1962.

Primaries were held April 10, 1962.

== Election information ==
1962 was a midterm election year in the United States.

The Republican Party saw a successful performance in Illinois. However, many of their wins were by narrow margins.

=== Turnout ===
In the primary election, turnout was 38.76% with 2,109,975 ballots cast (1,171,443 Democratic and 938,532 Republican).

In the general election, turnout was 74.67% with 3,812,120 ballots cast.

== Federal elections ==
=== United States Senate ===
Incumbent Republican Everett M. Dirksen won reelection to a third term

=== United States House ===
Illinois had redistricted. It had lost one congressional seat as a result of reapportionment following the 1960 United States census. The remaining 24 Illinois seats in the United States House of Representatives were up for election in 1962.

Before the election, Illinois had 14 Democratic seats and 11 Republican seats. In 1962, 12 Democrats and 12 Republicans were elected in Illinois.

== State elections ==
=== Treasurer ===
1962 Illinois State Treasurer election
- November 6, 1962
- Turnout: 70.67%
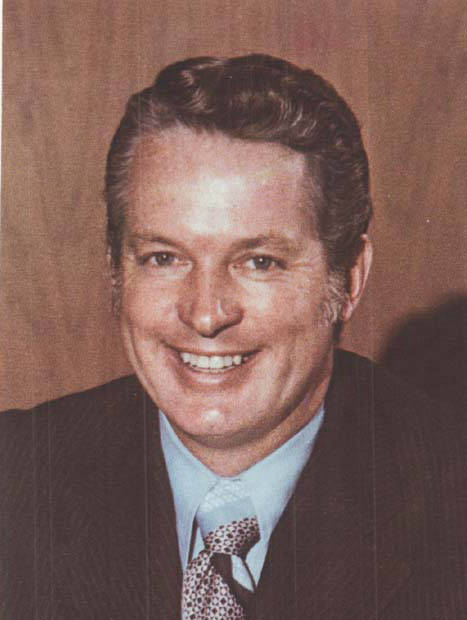

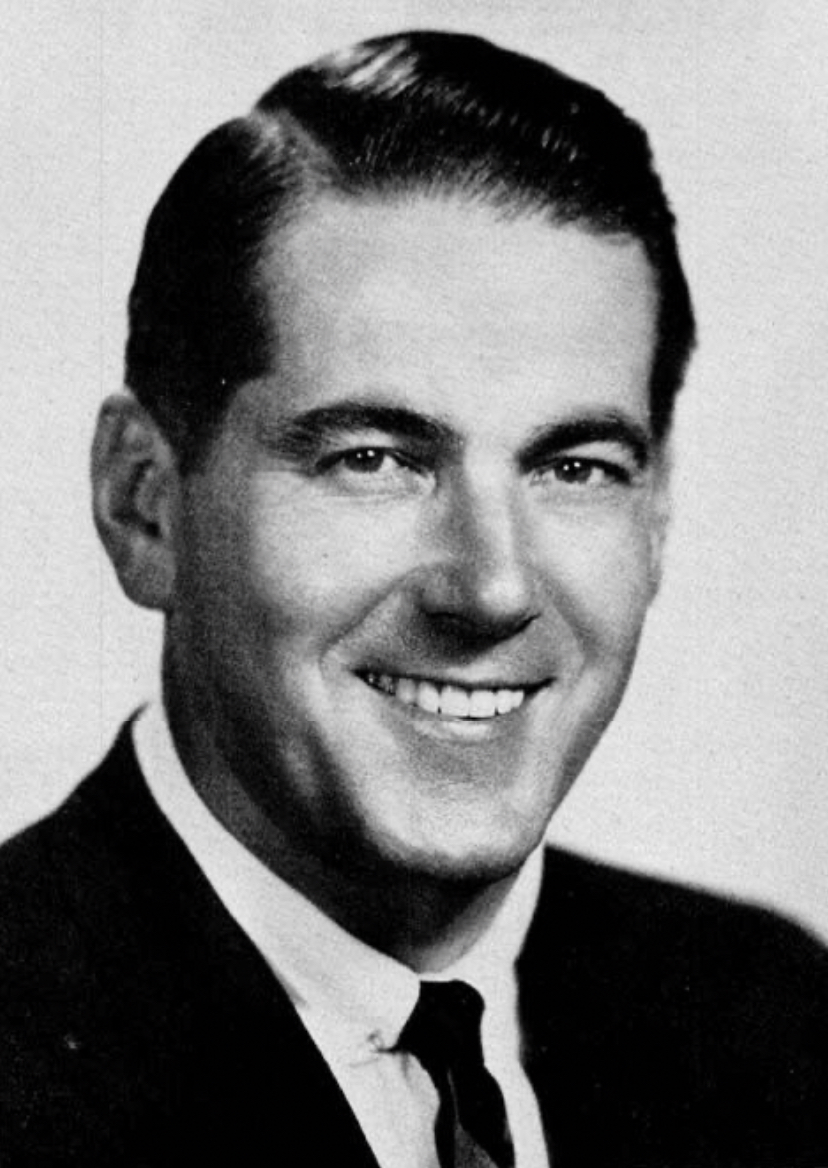
Nominee	William J. Scott	Francis S. Lorenz
Party	Republican	Democratic
Popular vote	1,831,925	1,776,090
Percentage	50.77%	49.23%
- County results Scott: 50–60% 60–70% 70–80% Lorenz: 50–60% 60–70%
Treasurer before election
Francis S. Lorenz
Democratic
Elected Treasurer
William J. Scott
Republican

Incumbent Treasurer Francis S. Lorenz, a Democrat appointed in 1961, lost reelection to Republican William J. Scott.

==== Democratic primary ====
Treasurer Democratic primary
Party	Candidate	Votes	%
Democratic	Francis S. Lorenz (incumbent)	836,185	100
Write-in	Others	1	0.00
Total votes		836,186	100

==== Republican primary ====
Treasurer Republican primary
Party	Candidate	Votes	%
Republican	William J. Scott	335,095	42.30
Republican	Walter J. Reum	302,718	38.21
Republican	Maurice W. Coburn	154,449	19.50
Total votes		792,262	100

==== General election ====
Treasurer election
Party	Candidate	Votes	%
Republican	William J. Scott	1,831,925	50.77
Democratic	Francis S. Lorenz (incumbent)	1,776,090	49.23
Total votes		3,608,015	100

=== Superintendent of Public Instruction ===
1962 Illinois Superintendent of Public Instruction election
- November 6, 1962
- Turnout: 70.25%
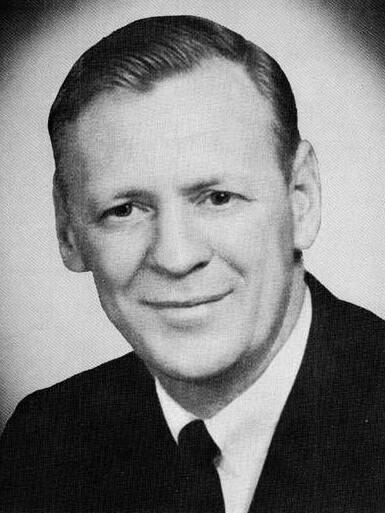

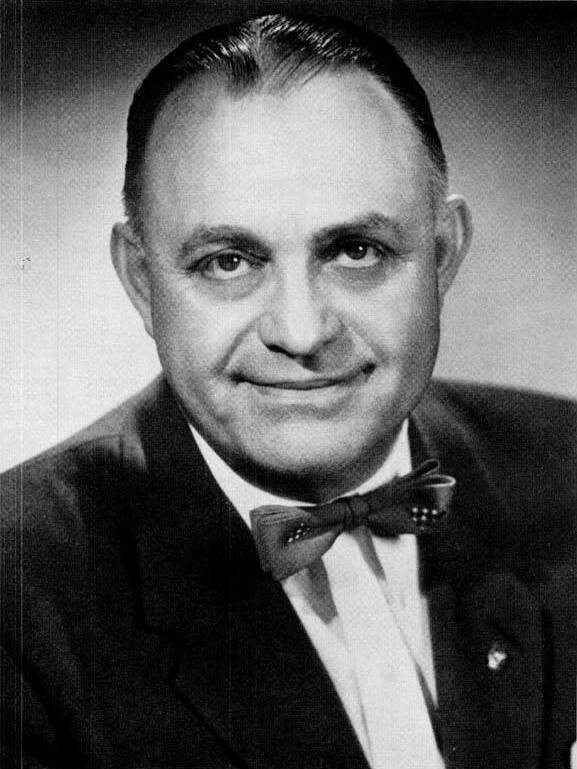
Nominee	Ray Page	George T. Wilkins
Party	Republican	Democratic
Popular vote	1,812,671	1,773,758
Percentage	50.54%	49.46%
- County results Page: 50–60% 60–70% 70–80% Wilkins: 50–60% 60–70%
Superintendent before election
George T. Wilkins
Democratic
Elected Superintendent
Ray Page
Republican

Incumbent Superintendent of Public Instruction George T. Wilkins, a Democrat seeking a second term, was defeated by Republican Ray Page.

==== Democratic primary ====
Superintendent of Public Instruction Democratic primary
Party	Candidate	Votes	%
Democratic	George T. Wilkins (incumbent)	722,759	100
Write-in	Others	2	0.0
Total votes		722,761	100

==== Republican primary ====
Superintendent of Public Instruction Republican primary
Party	Candidate	Votes	%
Republican	Ray Page	466,195	61.12
Republican	Louis Bottino	296,594	38.88
Write-in	Others	3	0.00
Total votes		762,792	100

==== General election ====
Superintendent of Public Instruction election
Party	Candidate	Votes	%
Republican	Ray Page	1,812,671	50.54
Democratic	George T. Wilkins (incumbent)	1,773,758	49.46
Total votes		3,586,429	100

=== Clerk of the Supreme Court ===
1962 Clerk of the Supreme Court election
- November 6, 1962
- Turnout: 69.84%
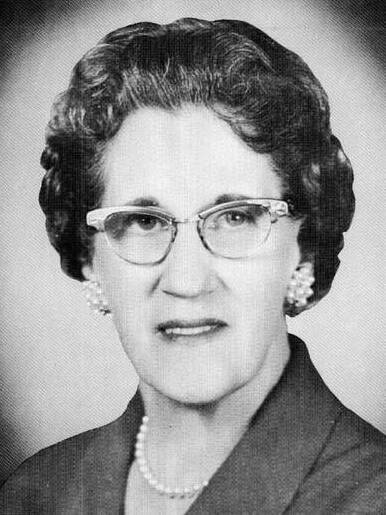

Nominee	Fae Searcy	James P. Alexander
Party	Republican	Democratic
Popular vote	1,824,126	1,741,010
Percentage	51.17%	48.83%
- County results Searcy: 50–60% 60–70% 70–80% Alexander: 50–60% 60–70%
Clerk before election
Fae Searcy
Republican
Elected Clerk
Fae Searcy
Republican

Incumbent Clerk of the Supreme Court Fae Searcy, a Republican, won reelection to a second full term.

Instead of being listed by her own name, Searcy opted to be listed on the ballot in both the primary and general election as "Ms. Earle Benjamin Searcy".

==== Democratic primary ====
Clerk of the Supreme Court Democratic primary
Party	Candidate	Votes	%
Democratic	James P. Alexander	811,361	100
Write-in	Others	1	0.00
Total votes		811,361	100

==== Republican primary ====
Clerk of the Supreme Court Republican primary
Party	Candidate	Votes	%
Republican	Fae Searcy (incumbent)	709,069	
Write-in	Others	3	0.00
Total votes		709,072	100

==== General election ====
Clerk of the Supreme Court election
Party	Candidate	Votes	%
Republican	Fae Searcy (incumbent)	1,824,126	51.17
Democratic	James P. Alexander	1,741,010	48.83
Total votes		3,565,136	100

=== State Senate ===
Seats in the Illinois Senate were up for election in 1962. Republicans retained control of the chamber.

=== State House of Representatives ===
Seats in the Illinois House of Representatives were up for election in 1962. Republicans retained control of the chamber.

=== Trustees of University of Illinois ===
1962 Trustees of University of Illinois election
- November 6, 1962

An election was held for three of nine seats for Trustees of University of Illinois.

The election saw the reelection of incumbent second-term Republican Wayne A. Johnston, first-term Republican Earl M. Hughes, and fellow Republican Timothy W. Swain (who had been appointed in 1955, and elected to his first full term in 1956).

Trustees of the University of Illinois election
Party	Candidate	Votes	%
Republican	Wayne A. Johnston (incumbent)	1,842,328	17.38
Republican	Earl W. Hughes (incumbent)	1,833,387	17.30
Republican	Timothy W. Swain (incumbent)	1,824,359	17.21
Democratic	Richard J. Nelson	1,705,884	16.09
Democratic	John T. Coburn	1,699,054	16.03
Democratic	Ivan A. Elliott Jr.	1,694,194	15.98
Write-in	Audrey Peak	14	0.00
Write-in	Others	3	0.00
Total votes		10,599,223	100

=== Judicial elections ===
1962 Illinois judicial elections
- April 10, 1962

Special judicial elections were held April 10 to fill vacancies. Additionally, the Superior Court of Cook County held elections on November 6.

==== Supreme Court ====
===== Third Supreme Court Judicial District (vacancy caused by the death of George W. Bristow) =====
Third Supreme Court Judicial District (vacancy caused by the death of George W. Bristow)
Party	Candidate	Votes	%
Republican	Robert C. Underwood	117,600	57.94
Democratic	Robert Zachariah Hickman	79,011	38.93
Others	Others	6,363	0.03
Total votes		202,975	100

==== Lower courts ====
Elections were held to fill seven vacancies on the Superior Court of Cook County. Democratic nominees defeated their Republican opponents in all seven elections. The Superior Court of Cook County also held regularly scheduled elections on November 6.

=== Ballot measures ===
Two ballot measures were put before voters in 1962. One was a legislatively referred state statute and one was a legislatively referred constitutional amendment.

In order to be approved, legislatively referred state statues required the support of a majority of those voting on the statute. In order to be placed on the ballot, proposed legislatively referred constitutional amendments needed to be approved by two-thirds of each house of the Illinois General Assembly. In order to be approved, they required approval of either two-thirds of those voting on the amendment itself or a majority of all ballots cast in the general elections.

==== General Banking Law Amendment ====
The General Banking Law Amendment was approved by voters as a legislatively referred state statute. It made modified the state's banking law.

Illinois General Banking Law Amendment
Candidate	Votes	%
Yes	1,321,405	60.16
No	875,212	39.84
Total votes	2,196,617	100
Turnout	{{{votes}}}	43.03%

Amendment results by county Yes: 70–80%; 60–70%; 50–60%; No: 60–70%; 50–60%

==== Judicial Amendment ====
Voters approved the Judicial Amendment, which amended Article VI of the 1870 Constitution of Illinois.

In order for constitutional amendments to be passed by voters, they required either two-thirds support among those specifically voting on the measure or 50% support among all ballots cast in the elections.

Judicial Amendment
Option	Votes	% of votes on measure	% of all ballots cast
Yes	2,166,917	65.90	56.84
No	1,121,237	34.10	29.41
Total votes	3,288,154	100	86.26
Voter turnout	64.41%		

Amendment results by county Yes: 80–90%; 70–80%; 60–70%; 50–60%; No: 80–90%; 70–80%; 60–70%; 50–60%

== Local elections ==
Local elections were held.
