= Earle Benjamin Searcy =

American politician

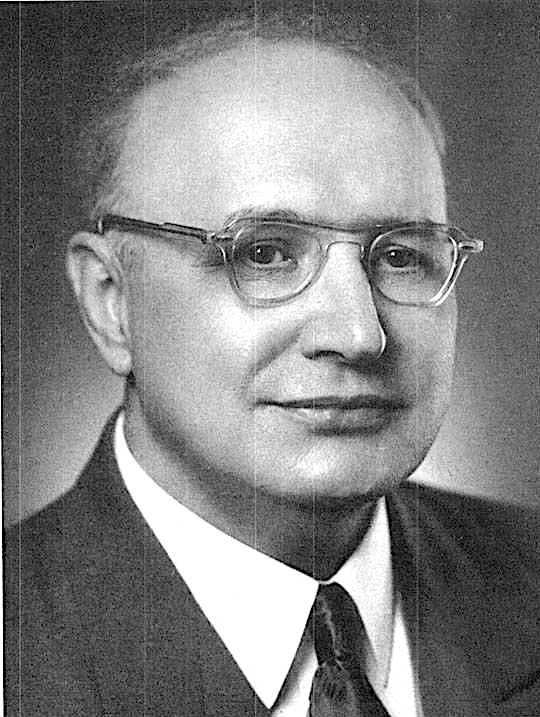
- official portrait, 1950s

Clerk of the Supreme Court of Illinois
- In office January 1945 – April 11, 1955
- Preceded by: Edward F. Cullinane
- Succeeded by: Fae Searcy

Illinois State Senator from 25th district
- In office 1923–1945

Illinois State Representative from 45 district
- In office 1921–1923

Personal details
- Born: May 4, 1887
- Died: April 11, 1955 (aged 67)
- Party: Republican
- Spouse: Fae Isenberg
- Children: 2

Military service
- Allegiance: United States
- Branch/service: United States Army
- Battles/wars: World War I

Earle Benjamin Searcy (May 4, 1887 – April 11, 1955) was an American politician who served as clerk of the Supreme Court of Illinois, Illinois state senator, and Illinois state representative.

== Early life ==
Searcy was born on May 4, 1887, in Palmyra, Illinois. He worked as a reporter for a newspaper in Springfield, Illinois. He also worked as a department editor for the Illinois State Highway Department.

He served in the United States Army during World War I. He then worked as a real estate broker.

== Political career ==
Searcy was a Republican.

In 1920 he was elected an Illinois state representative. In 1923, he was elected Illinois State Senator.

In 1936, he ran unsuccessfully in the Republican primary for Illinois Auditor of Public Accounts.

In 1940, he ran unsuccessfully in the Republican primary for lieutenant governor of Illinois.

In 1944 he was elected clerk of the Supreme Court of Illinois. He was reelected in 1950.

== Personal life ==
He married Fae Searcy (née Isenberg) in 1917. They were parents to Barbara Jane Searcy Damewood and Earle B. Searcy.

=== Death ===
Searcy died of a heart attack on April 11, 1955, at the age of 67. He died in office, and his wife was appointed clerk of the Supreme Court in a widow's succession. She would go on to be elected in her own right at the next election in 1956. She would be further reelected in 1962.
