= Warren L. Wood =

American politician

Warren L. Wood (February 5, 1910 – January 13, 1980) was an American businessman and legislator.

Born in Joliet, Illinois, Wood received his bachelor's degree from University of Illinois. He worked in the bank business and was a farmer in Plainfield, Illinois. Wood served in the United States Navy during World War II. From 1935 to 1945 and from 1947 to 1965, Wood served in the Illinois House of Representatives and was speaker of the house. He was a Republican. Wood died in Plainfield, Illinois.
