= 1942 Illinois elections =

- November 3, 1942

Elections were held in Illinois on Tuesday, November 3, 1942.

Primaries were held April 14, 1942.

== Election information ==
1942 was a midterm election year in the United States of America.

=== Turnout ===
In the primary election 1,963,298 ballots were cast (1,026,644 Democratic and 936,654 Republican).

In the general election 3,049,312 ballots were cast.

== Federal elections ==
=== United States Senate ===
Incumbent Republican Charles W. Brooks was reelected.

=== United States House ===
Illinois had redistricted before this election, and had lost one seat due to reapportionment following the 1950 United States census. All of Illinois' remaining 26 seats in the United States House of Representatives were up for election in 1942.

Before the election Republicans held 16 seats and Democrats held 11 seats from Illinois. In 1942, Republicans won 19 seats and Democrats won 7 seats.

== State elections ==
=== Treasurer ===
1942 Illinois State Treasurer election
- November 3, 1942
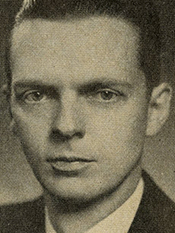

Nominee	William G. Stratton	W. D. Forsyth
Party	Republican	Democratic
Popular vote	1,553,944	1,300,091
Percentage	54.25%	45.39%
- County results Stratton: 40–50% 50–60% 60–70% 70–80% 80–90% Forsyth: 40–50% 50–60%
Treasurer before election
Warren Wright
Republican
Elected Treasurer
William G. Stratton
Republican

Incumbent first-term Treasurer, Republican Warren Wright, did not seek reelection, instead opting to run for United States Senate. Republican William G. Stratton was elected to succeed him.

==== Democratic primary ====
W. D. Forsyth defeated former Illinois Treasurer and Auditor of Public Accounts Edward J. Barrett and two other candidates.

Treasurer Democratic primary
Party	Candidate	Votes	%
Democratic	W. D. Forsyth	427,688	48.98
Democratic	Edward J. Barrett	332,011	38.02
Democratic	Edward J. Callahan	63,832	7.31
Democratic	John H. Condon	49,711	5.69
Total votes		873,242	100

==== Republican primary ====
Incumbent congressman William G. Stratton won the Republican nomination.

Treasurer Republican primary
Party	Candidate	Votes	%
Republican	William G. Stratton	625,445	79.27
Republican	Harold T. Halfpenny	100,637	12.75
Republican	Charles P. MacAuley	62,957	7.98
Total votes		789,039	100

==== General election ====
Treasurer election
Party	Candidate	Votes	%
Republican	William G. Stratton	1,553,944	54.25
Democratic	W. D. Forsyth	1,300,091	45.39
Prohibition	William G. Goodman	10,537	0.37
Total votes		2,864,572	100

=== Superintendent of Public Instruction ===
1942 Illinois Superintendent of Public Instruction election
- November 3, 1942
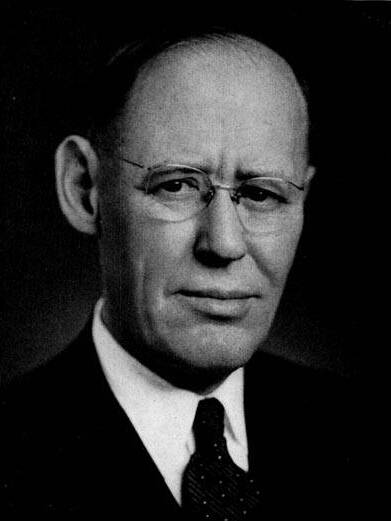

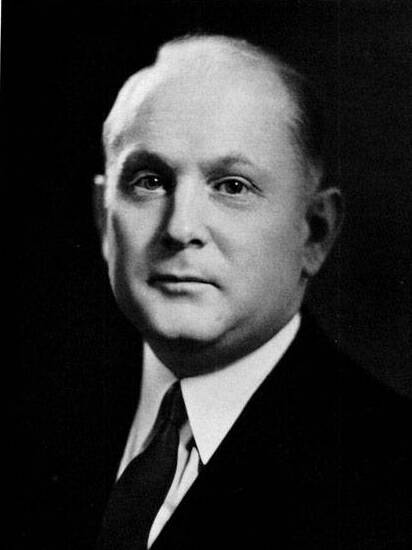
Nominee	Vernon L. Nickell	John A. Wieland
Party	Republican	Democratic
Popular vote	1,497,550	1,333,679
Percentage	52.71%	46.94%
Superintendent before election
John A. Wieland
Democratic
Elected Superintendent
Vernon L. Nickell
Republican

Incumbent second-term Superintendent of Public Instruction John A. Wieland, a Democrat, lost re-election, being unseated by Republican Vernon L. Nickell.-

==== Democratic primary ====
Superintendent of Public Instruction Democratic primary
Party	Candidate	Votes	%
Democratic	John A. Wieland (incumbent)	777,534	100
Write-in	Others	19	0.00
Total votes		777,553	100

==== Republican primary ====
Superintendent of Public Instruction Republican primary
Party	Candidate	Votes	%
Republican	Vernon L. Nickell	348,379	48.56
Republican	Wiley B. Garvin	151,007	21.05
Republican	Michael I. Cleary	114,804	16.00
Republican	W. C. Handlin	103,276	14.40
Write-in	Others	1	0.00
Total votes		717,467	100

==== General election ====
Superintendent of Public Instruction election
Party	Candidate	Votes	%
Republican	Vernon L. Nickell	1,497,550	52.71
Democratic	John A. Wieland (incumbent)	1,333,679	46.94
Prohibition	Clay Freeman Gaumer	9,944	0.35
Total votes		2,841,173	100

=== State Senate ===
Seats in the Illinois Senate were up for election in 1942. Republicans retained control of the chamber.

=== State House of Representatives ===
Seats in the Illinois House of Representatives were up for election in 1942. Republicans retained control of the chamber.

=== Trustees of University of Illinois ===
1942 Trustees of University of Illinois election
- November 3, 1942

3 out of 9 seats on the University of Illinois Board of Trustees 5 seats needed for a majority
	Majority party	Minority party
Party	Republican	Democratic
Seats before	4	5
Seats after	6	3
Seat change	▲2	▼2
Popular vote	4,492,540	3,859,990 ½
Percentage	53.57%	46.03%
Swing	▲3.13%^{[A]}	▼3.24%^{[B]}
Seats up	1	2
Races won	3	0

An election was held for three of nine seats for Trustees of University of Illinois. All three Republican nominees won. With their net increase of two seats in this election, Republicans captured a majority of seats on the University of Illinois Board of Trustees.

Incumbent Republican Chester R. Davis (elected in a special election two years prior) was reelected. New Republican members Martin G. Luken and Frank H. McKelvey were also elected.

Incumbent Democrats Homer M. Adams and James M. Cleary were not renominated.

Kenney E. Williamson, one of the Democratic Party nominees, had briefly served before, having been appointed in 1940.

Trustees of the University of Illinois election
Party	Candidate	Votes	%
Republican	Chester R. Davis (incumbent)	1,515,787	18.08
Republican	Frank H. McKelvey	1,500,721½	17.90
Republican	Martin G. Luken	1,476,031½	17.60
Democratic	T. V. Smith	1,322,287½	15.77
Democratic	Walter Williams	1,272,182½	15.17
Democratic	Kenney E. Williamson	1,265,520½	15.09
Prohibition	Mildred E. Young	11,542	0.14
Prohibition	Alonzo L. Parrott	10,927½	0.13
Prohibition	Minnie Broom Koss	10,563	0.13
Write-in	Others	2	0.00
Total votes		8,385,565	100

=== Judicial elections ===
==== Supreme Court ====
On June 1, 1942, several districts of the Supreme Court of Illinois had elections.

===== 1st district =====
Republican Charles H. Thompson unseated Democratic incumbent Paul Farthing.

1st district Supreme Court of Illinois election
Party	Candidate	Votes	%
Republican	Charles H. Thompson	55,832	50.99
Democratic	Paul Farthing (incumbent)	53,667	49.01
Total votes		109,499	100

===== 2nd district =====
Republican incumbent June C. Smith with reelected.

2nd district Supreme Court of Illinois election
Party	Candidate	Votes	%
Republican	June C. Smith (incumbent)	48,380	57.47
Democratic	D.H. Mudge	35,811	42.54
Total votes		84,191	100

===== 3rd district =====
Republican incumbent Walter T. Gunn was reelected, running unopposed.

3rd district Supreme Court of Illinois election
Party	Candidate	Votes	%
Republican	Walter T. Gunn (incumbent)	14,208	98.67
Others	Write-in	192	1.33
Total votes		14,400	100

===== 6th district =====
Incumbent Democrat Elwyn Riley Shaw was unseated by Republican William J. Fulton.

6th district Supreme Court of Illinois election
Party	Candidate	Votes	%
Republican	William J. Fulton	35,015	74.51
Democratic	Elwyn R. Shaw (incumbent)	11,976	25.49
Others	Write-in	1	0.00
Total votes		46,992	100

===== 7th district =====
Incumbent Democrat Francis S. Wilson was reelected, running unopposed.

7th district Supreme Court of Illinois election
Party	Candidate	Votes	%
Democratic	Francis S. Wilson (incumbent)	254,707	99.78
Others	Write-in	552	0.22
Total votes		255,259	100

==== Lower courts ====
Election were held on November 3, 1942, to fill two vacancies on the 16th Judicial Circuit and one vacancy on the 17th Judicial Circuit.

An election was held November 3, 1942 to fill two vacancies on the Superior Court of Cook County.

=== Ballot measure ===
One measure was put before voters in 1942.

==== Illinois Revenue Amendment ====
The Illinois Revenue Amendment, a proposed amendment to Section 1 of Article IX of the Constitution, failed to meet the threshold for approval.

If approved, this amendment would have enabled the legislature to exempt from certain taxes businesses that sold food for human consumption, allowing the legislature to define the word "food".

In order to be approved, legislatively referred constitutional amendments required approval equal to a majority of voters voting in the entire general election.

Illinois Revenue Amendment
Option	Votes	% of all ballots cast
Yes	979,892	32.14
No	346,232	11.35
Total votes	1,326,124	43.49

== Local elections ==
Local elections were held.

== Notes ==
^A This figure (3.13%) represents the increase from the share of both the result of the 1940 regular election and the combined vote of the 1940 regular and special elections (Republicans won 50.44% of both these election totals in 1940).
^B This figure (3.24) represents the decrease from the share of the combined vote of the 1940 regular and special elections. The change from the result of the 1940 regular election alone would be 3.13%.
