= Senator MacLean =

Senator MacLean may refer to:

- Paul McLean (politician) (born 1937), Senate of Australia
- William H. MacLean (fl. 1900s–1910s), Illinois State Senate
- William Q. MacLean Jr. (1934–2026), Massachusetts State Senate

== See also ==
- Senator McLean (disambiguation)
