= Paul Farthing =

American judge (1887–1976)

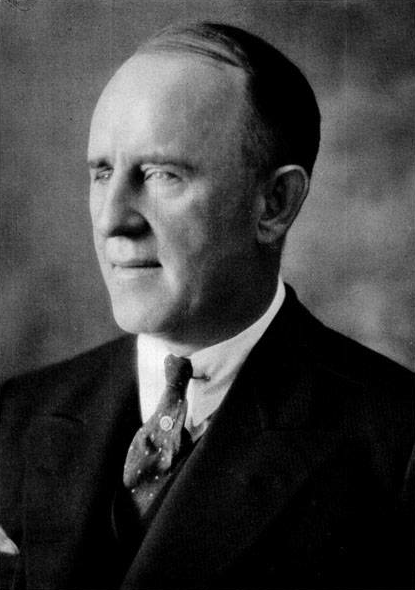
- Official portrait, 1933

Chief Justice of the Supreme Court of Illinois
- In office June 1937 – June 1938

Justice of the Supreme Court of Illinois from the 1st district
- In office 1933–1942
- Succeeded by: Charles H. Thompson

Illinois Court of Claims
- In office 1950–1954
- Appointed by: Adlai Stevenson II; William Stratton

St. Clair Circuit Court Judge
- In office 1930–1933

Personal details
- Born: April 12, 1887
- Died: December 2, 1976 (aged 89) Belleville, Illinois
- Party: Democratic Party
- Spouse: Harriett
- Children: 3
- Education: McKendree University and University of Illinois Law School

William Dudley Paul Farthing (April 12, 1887 – December 2, 1976) was an American jurist who served on the Supreme Court of Illinois from 1933 until 1942 and on the Illinois Court of Claims from 1950 until 1954. Before this, he served as a St. Clair County Circuit Court from 1930 until 1933. Farthing was blind for most of his life, having loss his eyesight in a hunting accident at the age of twelve.

In 1949, President Harry Truman short-listed him as a possible nominee for the United States Supreme Court.

== Early life and education ==
Farthing was born April 122, 1887 in Odin, Illinois. He was one of two sons of his parens, William Dudley Farthing and Sarah Boyd Farthing née Philips. While his full name was" "William Dudley Paul Farthing", he was better-known as "Paul Farthing" and many government documents throughout his lifetime referred to him as the latter.

Farthing was blinded in a hunting accident when he was twelve years old. He attended the Illinois School for the Blind, graduating in 1904. He then received his bachelor's degree from McKendree University in 1909 and his law degree from University of Illinois Law School in 1913. While he was attending university, his brother Chester enrolled alongside him and helped study by reading the materials to him. Farthing was known to have a strong memory, which allowed him to in retain information that was read to him.

== Private practice career ==
After graduating law school, Fathering practiced law, opening a private practice in East St. Louis, Illinois. For much of his legal career, he practiced alongside his brother since they had both graduated law school together. Farthing resided in Belleville, Illinois his entire adult life, and after initially working out of East St. Louis, he shortened his commute by moving his practice's office to Belleville.

After leaving the state supreme court, Farthing returned to private practice, rejoining his brother Chester at their firm of Farthing, Farthing, and Feickert. In July 1958, his brother retired, and Farthing joined the Belleville law office of his own son William. Farthing retired in 1966 at the age of 79.

== Master in Chancery of the East St. Louis City court ==
For six years, Farthing served as master in chancery for the city court of East St. Louis.

== Judicial career ==
=== St. Clair County Circuit Court (1930–33) ===
In 1924, he ran unsuccessfully as the Democratic for the St. Clair County Circuit Court. His wife, Harriet, accompanied him on the campaign trail, driving him to events.

Farthing ran again in 1930, that time winning election.

=== Illinois Supreme Court (1933–42) ===
In 1933, he won election to the first district seat on the Illinois Supreme Court, defeating Charles H. Miller. The election was contentious. As a Democrat, Farthing benefited from the same political climate that had allowed Franklin Delano Roosevelt to win a landslide election in the previous year's presidential election. He served a single term.

In October 1933 (several months after joining the court), he authored his first opinion in People v. Scowley. In 1939, Farthing authored a dissenting opinion in Swing et al. v. American Federation of Labor. The majority opinion upheld a lower court ruling that allowed a union members to be denied the right to picket a workplace they were not employed at regardless of whether the protest was peaceful. Farthing dissented from this. When the United States Supreme Court reversed this decision in American Federation of Labor v. Swing, the majority opinion by Felix Frankfurter and the concurrences authored by Hugo Black and William O. Douglas agreed with the argument that had been made in Farthing's dissent.

After the passage of the Civil Practice Act of 1934, the court occupied much of its time with writing rules of civil procedure of the state's court system. This took several years, and resulted in the creation of 71 rules. Efforts were made during this process to have the rules address procedural concerns that had gone largely unaddressed in the decades since the state had ratified its 1870 constitution. However, many of these problems ultimately went unaddressed until voters approved a constitutional amendment in 1962.

From June 1937 until June 1938, he served as chief justice of the court. The chief judge position rotated between the court's justices.

While on the court, Farthing remained involved in Democratic Party politics, and was a delegate to the 1936 Democratic National Convention.

Farthing lost re-election in 1942, when Illinois saw a wave election favoring Republican judicial candidates. Republican nominee Charles H. Thompson defeated farthing by a margin of less than 2%.

=== Consideration by Truman for U.S. Supreme Court nomination ===
In 1949, Farthing was one of six short-listed candidates that President Harry S. Truman considered to replace Wiley Rutledge on the U.S. Supreme Court. Truman instead nominated Sherman Minton, who was confirmed.

=== Illinois Court of Claims (1950–54) ===
In 1950, governor Adlai Stevenson II appointed Farthing to the Illinois Court of Claims. In 1952, he was re-appointed for a second term by Republican governor William Stratton. In 1954, he resigned from the court early, doing so before the expiration of his second term.

== Personal life and death ==
Farthing and his wife Harriet had three children: daughters Sarah M. Kenegy (née Farthing) and Edna Grace McKinley (née Farthing), son William Dudley Farthing. Edna predeceased Farthing.

Farthing was a founder of the Belleville Optimist Club. He served leadership roles within his local Presbyterian congregation.

Over the course of 27 years, Farthing and his brother Chester assembled a complete collection of all 260 volumes of imprints of Illinois laws, dating back to its territorial era. In 1952, they donated this collection to the DePaul University Library. At the time of the donation, the collection was valued at $17,000.

Farthing died at Belleville's St. Elizabeth's Hospital on December 2, 1976 at the age of 89. His funeral was held at the First Presbyterian Church. He was survived by his widow Harriet, his daughter Sarah, and his son William.
