= Oscar G. Mayer Sr. =

American businessman (1888-1965)

- Born: Oscar Gottfried Mayer; March 10, 1888; Chicago, Illinois, U.S.
- Died: March 5, 1965 (aged 76); Evanston, Illinois, U.S.
- Education: St. Ambrose University; Beloit College; University of Wisconsin–Madison
- Occupation: Businessman
- Spouse: Elsa Stiglitz (m. ?)
- Children: 4 (including Oscar G. Mayer Jr.)
- Parent(s): Oscar F. Mayer; Louise Greiner

Oscar Gottfried Mayer (March 10, 1888 – March 5, 1965) was an American business executive who served as chairman and president of Oscar Mayer, the processed-meat firm founded by his father.

== Early life and education ==
In his youth, Mayer spent much of his time helping out in the Chicago store his father established, and his sausage-packing plant nearby. He attended Harvard University, graduating in 1909.

== Oscar Mayer ==
Mayer then went to work in the operations department of the family business. In 1919, Mayer oversaw the acquisition of a meat-packing plant in Madison, Wisconsin, that became the firm's major processing facility (and later the site of its corporate headquarters), growing the Madison unit to employ 3,000 to 4,000 workers by the time of his death. Mayer was named as the firm's president in 1928, and served in that role until March 1955 when he was appointed as the company's chairman. Under his leadership, the company grew from 200 employees and $4 million in annual sales, to 8,500 employees and $300 million in yearly revenues by 1965.

As an adjunct to his post at Oscar Mayer, he served from 1924 to 1928 as president of the Institute of American Meat Packers (later known as the American Meat Institute), advancing its interest in improving the quality of meat sold in the United States and encouraging consumers to consume more meat.

In February 1966, his son Oscar Gustave Mayer (known as Oscar G. Mayer Jr.) was named as the firm's chairman, filling the vacancy created by his death.

== Personal life ==
At the urging of the Mayor of Chicago, Carter Harrison IV, Mayer became involved in Chicago civic organizations, starting in 1912 when he was named to the board of the Chicago Public Library. He was a longtime participant in the Chicago Association of Commerce and Industry, serving as its president from 1938 to 1940. He served on the board of trustees of the University of Illinois from 1934 to 1940, and as its chairman in 1938 and 1939. He had been elected as a Republican to the board in a special election in 1940, and was reelected in 1942.

He received honorary degrees from Ambrose College, Beloit College and the University of Wisconsin. In 1965, Chicago's Loyola University selected him as one of six city residents recognized for their "dedicated service in the Chicago community." Northwestern University honored him in 1951 with its Centennial Award.

Mayer died at age 76 on March 5, 1965, almost 10 years after his father, at his home in Evanston, Illinois. He had suffered two heart attacks in 1952. He was survived by his wife, the former Elsa Stiglitz, as well as a daughter, three sons and 12 grandchildren.

His 41-page will left to the Oscar and Elsa Mayer Charitable Trust the majority of his estate, which included stock in the family business valued at $66 million (equivalent to $659 million in 2024), with the proceeds to be used for "charitable, educational and scientific purposes." His four children were given a $510,000 trust and his wife was bequeathed $25,000 in cash and a trust fund that was to provide her with $30,000 annually for the remainder of her life.
