= Oscar G. Mayer Jr. =

American business executive (1914–2009)

- Born: Oscar Gustave Mayer; March 16, 1914; Chicago, Illinois, U.S.
- Died: July 6, 2009 (aged 95); Fitchburg, Wisconsin, U.S.
- Education: Cornell University; Harvard Business School (dropped out)
- Occupation: Businessman
- Spouses: Rosalie Harrison Mayer (m.? -d. 1998); Geraldine Fitzpatrick (m. 1999)
- Children: 3
- Parent(s): Oscar G. Mayer Sr. Elsa Stiglitz

Oscar Gustave Mayer (March 16, 1914 – July 6, 2009) was an American business executive who served as chairman of the Oscar Mayer meat and cold cut production company headquartered in Madison, Wisconsin, the third Oscar Mayer to lead the family business, following his grandfather, company founder, Oscar F. Mayer, who died in 1955, and his father, Oscar G. Mayer Sr., who died in 1965.

== Early life and education ==
Mayer was born in Chicago on March 16, 1914. He attended Cornell University. where he was business manager of The Cornell Daily Sun, was elected to the Sphinx Head Society, and graduated in 1934. He briefly attended Harvard Business School, but left due to health issues.

== Career ==
In 1936, Mayer was hired in the accounting department of the family business's Chicago offices. He relocated to the company's office in Madison, Wisconsin, in 1946, which became the site of the company's headquarters in 1955.

In February 1966, Mayer was named the firm's chairman, filling the vacancy created in the post when his father died nearly a year earlier. P. Goff Beach was named to succeed Mayer as the firm's president.

Mayer credited his success to his involvement in the smallest details of the company's operations during his career, recalling how he had processed the company's payroll account by hand when he was one of the firm's three accountants. He stated that "I've always felt I might have a little better understanding of what people in our plant have to do because I did it myself—I've always seen our employees as individuals and I respect the hard work they do."

Few people believed that there was a real "Oscar Mayer" at the company, as the company for many years employed George Molchan, a little person, as a mascot called "Little Oscar," and Mayer himself avoided publicity. He would travel nationwide with Little Oscar and the Wienermobile. After being informed that there were choking risks from the whistles shaped like hot dogs that he would distribute to children on these publicity tours, he had 2 million of the whistles destroyed, despite assurances from doctors that the likelihood of risk was low.

After leading the company to its first $1 billion in annual sales, he retired as chairman in 1977. A division of Kraft Foods at the time of his death, the company had been sold to General Foods, in 1981, some four years after Mayer's retirement.

== Personal life ==
After being approached to contribute towards a renovation project at Madison's Capitol Theatre, Mayer offered to make a matching grant, coming through with a surprise contribution of $250,000. The main theater at what became the Madison Civic Center was named the "Oscar Mayer Theatre" in his honor. A later project folded the Civic Center into what became the Overture Center. Mayer attended ceremonies that renamed the theater, home of the Wisconsin Chamber Orchestra, as the "Capitol Theater". This project was just one of the many community and charitable organizations with which Mayer was involved.

Mayer had three sons with his first wife, Rosalie Harrison Mayer, who died in 1998. A year later, he married Geraldine Fitzpatrick. He died on July 6, 2009, at HospiceCare Center in Fitchburg, Wisconsin, aged 95, and was survived by his second wife. His sons are Oscar Harrison Mayer, Donald Lawrence Mayer, and William Edward Mayer. In the next generation, his eight grandchildren are Oscar Henry Mayer, Stephanie Mayer Heydt, Patricia Mayer Lewis, Michelle Louise Gates, Chadwick Patterson Gates, Charlotte Marie Mathena, Donald Lee, and Wendy Ann. His great-grandchildren include Oscar Raymond Mayer.
