= Frederic R. DeYoung =

American judge and politician (1875-1934)

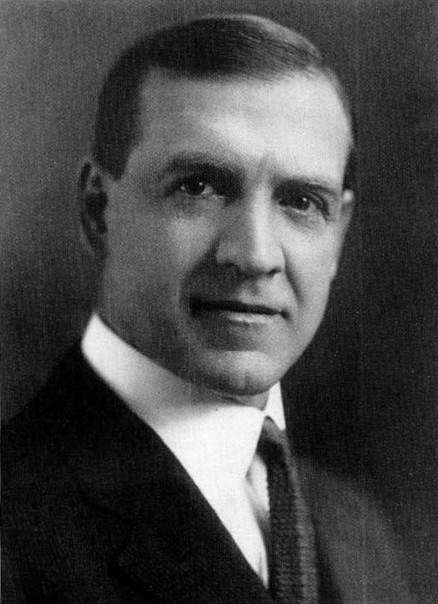

Justice of the Supreme Court of Illinois
- In office 1924 – November 16, 1934
- Succeeded by: Francis S. Wilson
- Constituency: 7th district

Justice of the Superior Court of Cook County
- In office 1923–1924

Justice of the Circuit Court of Cook County
- In office 1921
- Appointed by: Frank Lowden

Member of the Illinois House of Representatives
- In office 1915–1919 Serving with J. J. O'Rourke (1915–1917); Louis J. Pierson (1915–1917); Albert F. Volz (1917–1919); John Webster McCarthy (1917–1919)
- Preceded by: John M. Curran and Frederick B. Roos
- Succeeded by: Howard P. Castle
- Constituency: 7th district

Harvey City Attorney
- In office 1908–1919

Personal details
- Born: September 12, 1875 Chicago, Illinois
- Died: November 16, 1934 (aged 59) Chicago, Illinois
- Party: Republican
- Other political affiliations: Democratic
- Education: University of Chicago; Valparaiso University; Northwestern University School of Law
- Occupation: Jurist, politician

Frederic R. DeYoung (September 12, 1875 – November 16, 1934) was an American jurist and politician who served as a judge on the Supreme Court of Illinois (1924–1934), judge on the Superior Court of Cook County (1923–1924), judge on the original Circuit Court of Cook County (1921), member of the Illinois House of Representatives (1915–1919), and the city attorney of Harvey, Illinois (1908–1919), among other public offices. DeYoung ran as a Republican for most of his political career. However, in his last campaign (his 1933 reelection to the Supreme Court of Illinois), he ran instead as a Democrat.

While serving on the Supreme Court of Illinois, DeYoung authored more than 440 opinions. Among the more notable opinions which DeYoung authored was the opinion he authored for the City of Aurora v. Burns case which supported the constitutionality of zoning. This opinion was quoted at length in the opinion for the landmark United States Supreme Court decision Village of Euclid v. Ambler Realty Co., which upheld the national constitutionality of land use zoning.

== Early life and education ==
DeYoung was born September 12, 1874, in Chicago, Illinois, to parents that had both immigrated as children to the United States from The Netherlands. At the time of his birth, his family resided in one of the most ethnically diverse neighborhoods in the city. However, when he was five years of age, DeYoung's family moved to the village of Roseland, Illinois, which was ethnically Dutch at the time. Several years later, his family moved to South Holland, Illinois, which was a main center of Chicago area's Dutch population.

DeYoung was educated until leaving school at the age of twelve when his family returned to the West Side of Chicago in 1887. He never completed primary school or secondary school. In Chicago, he worked for a local jeweler. In 1890, when he was fifteen, he began working as a timekeeper at a Pullman Company factory near where he lived. He left this job to enroll at Bryant & Stratton Business College, but stopped attending after health issues prevented him from doing so. After this, DeYoung was sent to Europe by his father. Upon returning, he enrolled at Northern Indiana Normal School (which is today known as Valparaiso University), and graduated in 1895. After this, he enrolled at Northwestern University Law School, and received a Bachelor of Laws degree in 1897 at the age of twenty-two.

In 1901, DeYoung married Miriam Cornell, whom he had met while attending Northern Indiana Normal College. Together they settled in Harvey, Illinois, where they would live for nearly twenty-five years, until his election to the Supreme Court of Illinois.

== Early legal and political career ==
As both a law student and in his early law career, he worked for the law office of I. T. Greenacre. In private practice, he was associated with numerous prominent lawyers, including then-former Illinois state representative Louis J. Pierson (who would later return to the state house in 1915, incidentally being elected to represent the 7th district alongside DeYoung). Through his connections, he became involved in Republican Party politics.

== Harvey City Attorney ==
In 1907, DeYoung was elected Harvey City Attorney. He was twice reelected, and served until 1919.

== Illinois House of Representatives ==
In 1914, DeYoung was elected to the Illinois House of Representatives from the seventh district, representing some of the south suburbs of Chicago. In 1916, he was elected to a second two-year term. In his second term, he served as chairman of the judiciary committee.

== 1918 Cook County Probate Court campaign ==
Instead of seeking reelection to the state house, he opted to run for a judgeship on the Cook County Probate Court. However, he was defeated by incumbent Democrat Henry Horner. Horner won 176,839 votes, a plurality of 48,259 over DeYoung's 122,081 votes. In the city of Chicago, DeYoung won 143,362 votes to Horner's 191,621 (a result of 59.16% to 40.84%). However, DeYoung led the vote in suburban Cook County, winning 21,281 over Horner's 14,782 votes there.

After losing his 1918 campaign, he would serve as the first assistant attorney for the Sanitary District of Chicago. In November 1919, he was elected to serve as one of two delegates to the 1920 Illinois Constitutional Convention from the seventh legislative district of Illinois.

== Circuit Court of Cook County ==
In 1921, Governor Frank Lowden appointed him to fill a vacancy on the Circuit Court of Cook County. In June, DeYoung was an unsuccessful candidate for election to a full term on the Circuit Court of Cook County.

On December 23, 1921, DeYoung won a special contingent election that would have seen him hold a judgeship from the Supreme Court of Illinois' seventh district for a term expiring in 1933 had the proposed new Illinois constitution been ratified by voters at that election. Since the new constitution failed to win enough votes to be ratified, the election result was ultimately inconsequential.

== Superior Court of Cook County ==
In 1923, DeYoung was elected to a judgeship on the Superior Court of Cook County.

== Supreme Court of Illinois ==
In June 1924, DeYoung was elected a Republican to the Supreme Court of Illinois. He was reelected as a Democrat in 1933 to serve a second term, but died in office before finishing that term.

=== Notable opinions ===
During his ten years on the court, he authored more than 440 opinions.

The 1933 People v. Bruner was consequential in overturning a law that had been in effect since 1827 allowing juries in criminal cases to determine both law and facts. In his majority opinion, DeYoung held that it was unconstitutional by infringing on the right of judges to interoperate the law. He argued that the juries role was merely to determine matters of guilt or innocence. The Chicago Tribune hailed the decision as being, "the biggest step forward in criminal procedure in the last fifty years".

In People v. Fisher, DeYoung's majority decision ruled that, in a felony trail where the plea is not guilty, the defendant can waive a jury trial and have their cause heard and determined by the judge.

In City of Aurora v. Burns, DeYoung's wrote the first opinion that supported the constitutionally of zoning. It would be quoted in length in the landmark United States Supreme Court decision Village of Euclid v. Ambler Realty Co., which upheld the national constitutionally of land use zoning.

== Other work ==
DeYoung served on the Harvey Public Library Board and the Thornton Township High School Board. DeYoung was also president of the First National Bank of Harvey.

== Personal life ==
After their 1901 wedding, DeYoung and his wife Mirriam settled in Harvey, Illinois. Together they had a son named Herbert (who would grow up to become a lawyer) and a daughter named Ruth (who would grow up to take the name Ruth DeYoung Kohler after marrying Herbert Kohler Sr., and would become a notable journalist and women's rights activist).

=== Death ===
DeYoung died on November 16, 1934, in Chicago, Illinois, as a result of a stroke. Serving as honorary pallbearers at his funeral were his fellow Illinois Supreme Court justices and former governors Edward Fitzsimmons Dunne, Charles S. Deneen, and Frank Lowden. DeYoung was buried at Oak Lawn Cemetery.

== Electoral history ==
=== Illinois House of Representatives ===
Republican primary for the 1914 Illinois House of Representatives 7th district general election
Party	Candidate	Votes	%
Republican	Louis J. Pierson	5,113	31.30
Republican	Frederick R. DeYoung	4,929	30.17
Republican	Harry O. Meyer	3,747½	22.94
Republican	Walter S. Parker	2,547	15.59
Total votes		16,336½	100

1914 Illinois House of Representatives 7th district general election
Party	Candidate	Votes	%
Democratic	J. J. O'Rourke (incumbent)	14,709½	24.77
Republican	Louis J. Pierson	14,176	23.87
Republican	Frederic R. DeYoung	14,709½	23.63
Progressive	William A. Adams	6,444	10.85
Progressive	Julius H. Gewke	5,252½	8.84
Socialist	J.J. Hitchcock	4,778½	8.05
Total votes		59,393	100

Republican primary for the 1916 Illinois House of Representatives 7th district general election
Party	Candidate	Votes	%
Republican	Federick R. DeYoung (incumbent)	8,692½	41.77
Republican	Albert F. Volz	7,230	34.74
Republican	Lewis B. Springer	6,049½	29.07
Republican	William J. Cameron	2,307	11.08
Republican	Hugo J. Thal	1,695½	8.15
Republican	William A. Adams	1,658½	7.97
Republican	C.A. Hercules	1,519	7.30
Republican	Harry Otto Meyer	1,410½	6.78
Republican	John W. Carroll	3	0.01
Total votes		20,811	100

1916 Illinois House of Representatives 7th district general election
Party	Candidate	Votes	%
Republican	Frederick R. DeYoung (incumbent)	29,461½	28.88
Republican	Albert F. Volz	28,205	28.61
Democratic	John W. McCarthy	16,450	16.68
Democratic	Charles S. Bell	14,591½	14.80
Socialist	James A. Prout	4,964½	5.04
Independent	Hope Thompson	4,184	4.24
Progressive	A. Volz	742	0.75
Total votes		98,598½	100

=== Probate Court of Cook County ===
1918 Cook County Probate Court election
Party	Candidate	Votes	%
Democratic	Henry Horner (incumbent)	176,839	59.16
Republican	Frederick R. DeYoung	122,081	40.84
Total votes		298,920	100

=== Delegate to the 1920 Illinois Constitutional Convention ===
1920 Illinois Constitutional Convention 7th district delegate election (held November 4, 1919)
Party	Candidate	Votes	%
Republican	Frederic C. DeYoung	6,404	34.56
Republican	Amos C. Miller	6,356	34.39
Democratic	A.E. Rauland	2,385	12.90
Independent	John Stevens	1,471	7.96
Socialist	Charles Mergin	931	5.04
Socialist	Paul Matz	934	5.05
Independent	Fed Becker	1	0.00
Independent	John C. Tervan	1	0.00
Total votes		18,483	100

=== Cook County Circuit Court ===
1921 Cook County Circuit Court election
Party	Candidate	Votes	%
Democratic	George Kersen	349,249	
Democratic	David M. Brothers	336,053	
Democratic	Hugo M. Friend	332,971	
Democratic	Victor P. Arnold	332,544	
Democratic	Frank Johnston Jr.	332,021	
Democratic	Harry M. Fisher	330,841	
Democratic	George Fred Rush	330,456	
Democratic	Thomas G. Windes	329,897	
Democratic	David F. Matchett	329,724	
Democratic	Charles M. Thompson	329,250	
Democratic	John R. Caverly	329,036	
Democratic	Francis S. Wilson	328,266	
Democratic	Thomas Taylor Jr.	327,834	
Democratic	Oscar M. Torrison	326,767	
Democratic	Donald L. Morrill	325,109	
Democratic	Thomas J. Lynch	323,784	
Democratic	Philip L. Sullivan	323,322	
Democratic	John A. Swanson	320,503	
Democratic	Ira Ryner	311,582	
Republican	Bernard P. Barass	248,967	
Republican	Jesse Baldwin	238,387	
Republican	Frederick R. DeYoung	233,468	
Republican	Harry B. Miller	233,022	
Republican	Anton T. Zeman	232,967	
Republican	Edward S. Day	230,881	
Republican	Jesse Holdon	230,771	
Republican	James W. Breen	229,700	
Republican	James V. O'Donnell	228,856	
Republican	William W. Smith	226,010	
Republican	Henry Utpatel	225,912	
Republican	John Richardson	225,618	
Republican	Jacob Ringer	225,365	
Republican	Thomas J. Peden	225,194	
Republican	Edgar A. Jonas	224,316	
Republican	George A. Curran	223,167	
Republican	Henry T. Chace	222,320	
Republican	Eugene H. Dupee	222,101	
Republican	William C. Hartray	219,881	
Republican	Frank D. Ayers	219,274	
Socialist	Christian Meier	18,363	
Socialist	Swan M. Johnson	18,036	
Socialist	Mordecai Shulman	17,434	
Socialist	Samuel H. Holland	17,404	
Socialist	Carl Stover	17,331	
Socialist	Edward T. Saltiel	17,106	
Socialist	Hyman Epstein	17,047	
Socialist	Louis R. Holmes	16,954	
Socialist	Kellam Foster	16,927	
Socialist	Robert H. Howe	16,841	
Socialist	Marcus H. Taft	16,837	
Socialist	Oliver C. Wilson	16,831	
Socialist	Kasimir Gugis	16,829	
Socialist	John M. Collins	16,827	
Socialist	Daniel A. Uretz	16,828	
Socialist	Charles Beranek	16,802	
Socialist	Andrew Laflin	16,666	
Socialist	Louis T. Herzon	16,610	

=== Superior Court of Cook County ===
1923 Superior Court of Cook County election
Party	Candidate	Votes	%
Republican	Oscar Hebel (incumbent)	151,884	
Republican	Charles M. Foell (incumbent)	239,598	
Republican	Marcus Kavanagh (incumbent)	239,232	
Democratic	Jacob H. Hopkins	235,178	
Republican	Hugo Pam (incumbent)	332,908	
Republican	Hosea W. Wells	232,095	
Republican	Albert C. Barnes (incumbent)	231,355	
Democratic	Michael L. McKinley (incumbent)	231,189	
Republican	William H. McSurely (incumbent)	222,309	
Republican	William N. Gemmill	221,350	
Democratic	John M. O'Connor (incumbent)	220,564	
Democratic	Dennis E. Sullivan (incumbent)	217,420	
Republican	Wells M. Cook	217,328	
Democratic	Joseph H. Fitch (incumbent)	210,133	
Democratic	Charles A. Williams	209,330	
Republican	Emanuel Eller	203,248	
Republican	Frederic R. DeYoung	201,917	
Democratic	William J. Lindsay	201,435	
Republican	Howard W. Hayes	194,250	
Republican	Thomas Marshall	186,306	
Democratic	Marvin E. Barnhart	184,935	
Republican	George E. Gorman	184,904	
Democratic	James C. Jeffery	181,761	
Democratic	Harry P. Beam	180,011	
Republican	James W. Breen	179,674	
Republican	Iwrin R. Hazen	177,264	
Democratic	Julius F. Smietanka	172,696	
Republican	Anton T. Zeaman	174,891	
Democratic	John F. Bolton	169,795	
Republican	Louis J. Behan	169,258	
Democratic	Charles J. Michal	169,147	
Democratic	Max M. Korshak	161,795	
Democratic	Frank H. Graham	158,680	
Democratic	Martin J. Isaacs	152,778	
Republican	Frederick B. Roos	151,182	
Democratic	James H. Poage	150,932	
Republican	Edward H. Morris	147,597	
Democratic	Frank T. Huening	145,227	
Socialist	Marcus H. Taft	16,241	
Socialist	Pierce L. Anderson	15,395	
Socialist	Charles V. Johnson	15,183	
Socialist	John M. Collins	15,177	
Socialist	Kellam Foster	15,020	
Socialist	Otto Branstetter	14,618	
Socialist	Ivar Anderson	14,579	
Socialist	Mary O'Reilly	14,553	
Socialist	Jason A. Imes	14,229	
Socialist	John C. Flora	14,056	
Socialist	Leon J. Ell	13,901	
Socialist	John T. Whitlock	14,156	
Socialist	Herman Dickstein	14,152	
Socialist	Harry E. Aldrich	14,110	
Socialist	David Norstedt	14,029	
Socialist	Bernard Berlyn	13,907	
Socialist	Raphael B. Green	13,876	
Socialist	Bernard Kortas	13,864	
Socialist	Mike Ladevich	13,350	
Total votes			100

=== Supreme Court of Illinois ===
1922 special contingent election for the Illinois Supreme Court 7th District term expiring in 1933
Candidate	Votes	%
Frederick R. DeYoung	260,541	100
Total votes	260,541	100

Note: Election was of no effect due to failure of proposed new Illinois Constitution to be ratified by voters

1924 Illinois Supreme Court 7th District election
Party	Candidate	Votes	%
Republican	Frederick R. DeYoung	100,143	51.51
Democratic	Angus Roy Shannon	94,281	48.49
Scattering	Other	1	0.00
Total votes		194,425	100

1933 Illinois Supreme Court 7th District election
Party	Candidate	Votes	%
Democratic	Frederick R. DeYoung (incumbent)	535,928	100
Scattering	Other	4	0.00
Total votes		535,932	100
