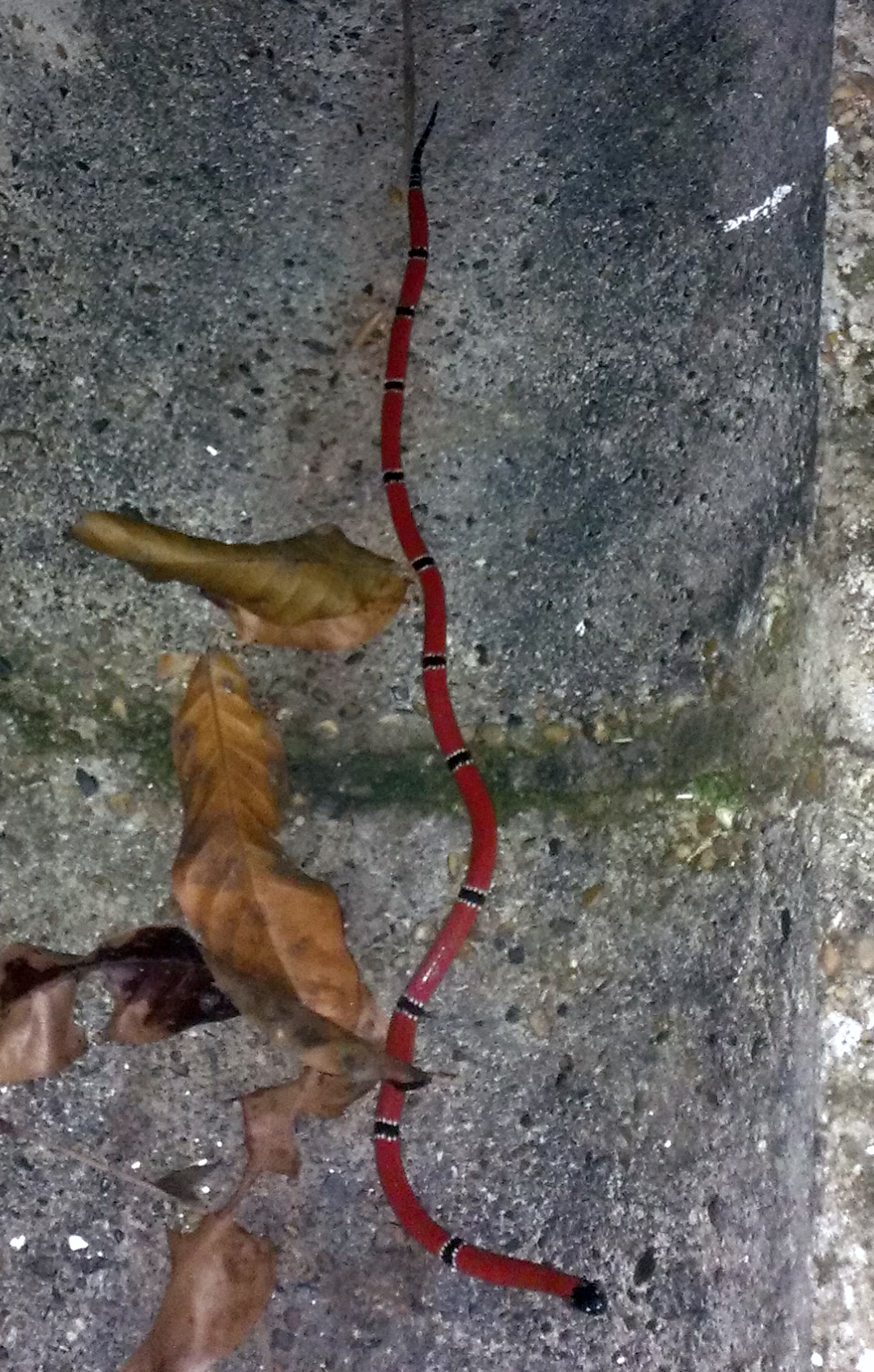

Conservation status
- Least Concern (IUCN 3.1)

Scientific classification
- Kingdom: Animalia
- Phylum: Chordata
- Class: Reptilia
- Order: Squamata
- Suborder: Serpentes
- Family: Elapidae
- Genus: Micrurus
- Species: M. averyi

Binomial name
- Micrurus averyi Schmidt, 1939
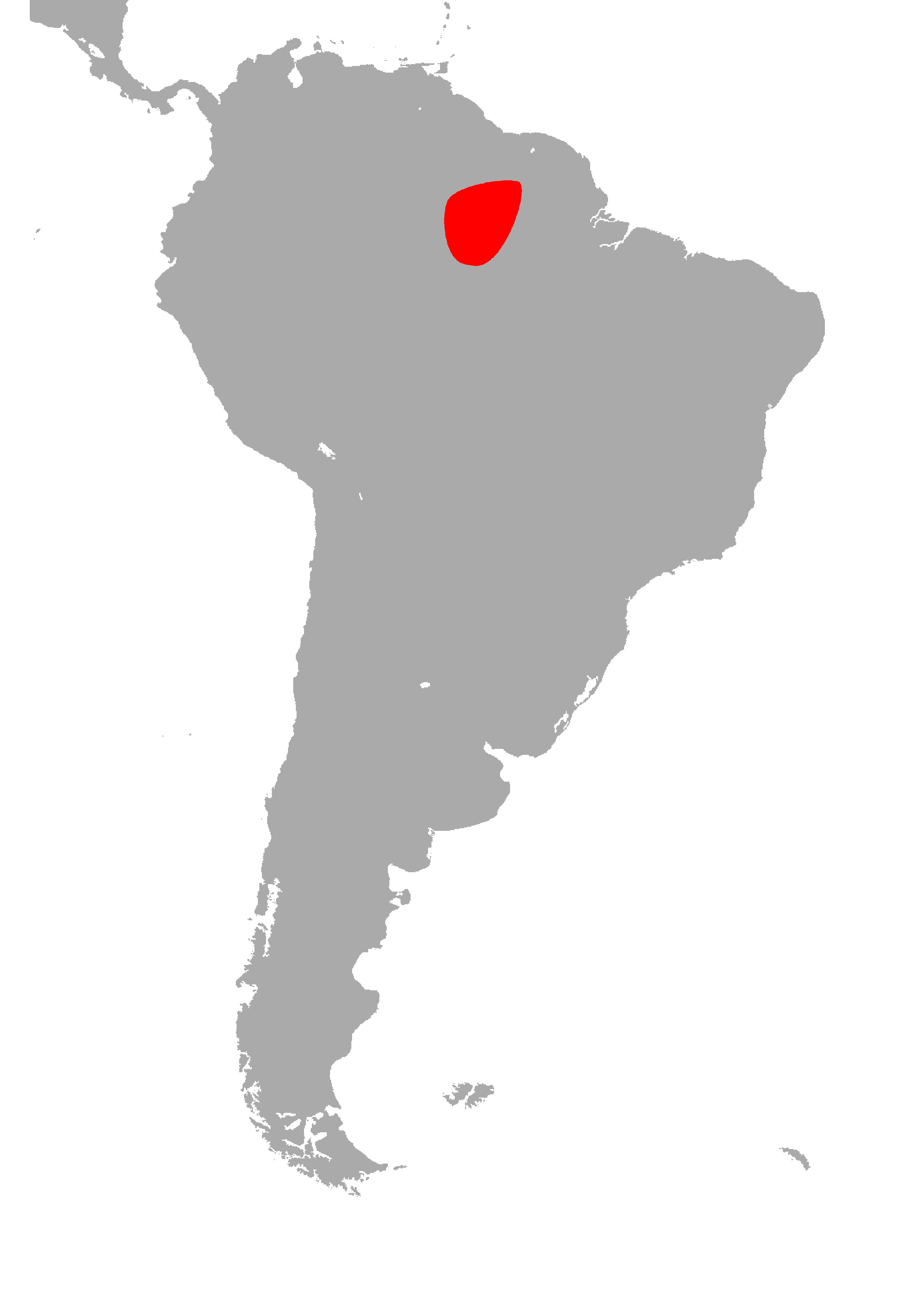

= Micrurus averyi =

Species of snake

Micrurus averyi, also known commonly as Avery's coral snake and the black-headed coral snake, is a species of venomous snake in the family Elapidae. The species is indigenous to northern South America.

== Etymology ==
The specific name, averyi, is in honor of American financier Sewell Avery, who funded the expedition during which the holotype was collected.

== Geographic distribution ==
Micrurus averyi is found in southern Guyana (in the headwaters of Courantyne River), southern Suriname, and Brazil (Pará, Amazonas, Mato Grosso).

== Habitat ==
The preferred natural habitat of Micrurus averyi is forest, at altitudes of 100–600 m (330–1,970 ft).

== Description ==
The head of Micrurus averyi is almost completely black, and there is no nuchal ring. The relatively few black rings on the body are not grouped in triads. The maximum recorded total length (tail included) is 70 cm (28 in).

== Reproduction ==
Micrurus averyi is oviparous.
