= Joseph Sam Perry =

American judge (1896–1984)

Senior Judge of the United States District Court for the Northern District of Illinois
- In office November 29, 1971 – February 18, 1984

Judge of the United States District Court for the Northern District of Illinois
- In office August 22, 1951 – November 29, 1971
- Appointed by: Harry S. Truman
- Preceded by: Elwyn Riley Shaw
- Succeeded by: William J. Bauer

Personal details
- Born: Joseph Samuel Perry; November 30, 1896 Carbon Hill, Alabama
- Died: February 18, 1984 (aged 87) Winfield, Illinois
- Party: Democratic
- Education: University of Alabama (A.B.); University of Chicago (M.A.); University of Chicago (J.D.)

Joseph Samuel Perry (November 30, 1896 – February 18, 1984) was a United States district judge of the United States District Court for the Northern District of Illinois.

== Early life and education ==
Born in Carbon Hill, Alabama, Perry was the son of a coal miner named Jack Perry, and Mary Elizabeth Brown. He worked on local farms and in area coal mines before joining the United States Navy and serving in Europe during World War I. After the war, he returned home to finish high school. Perry then earned an Artium Baccalaureus degree Phi Beta Kappa in 1923 from the University of Alabama and a Master of Arts degree from the University of Chicago School of Social Service Administration in 1925. He earned a J.D. degree from the University of Chicago Law School in 1927.

== Professional career ==
Perry worked in private law practice in Chicago, Illinois from 1928 until 1933, when he began working as a master in chancery in DuPage County, Illinois and as a private lawyer in Wheaton, Illinois. Democratic incumbent Michael F. Hennebry died May 12, 1936, after he and Dominic A. Romano were nominated in that year's Democratic primary. Local party leaders nominated Perry to serve as the replacement candidate. Romano filed suit to vacate the appointment. Due to Illinois's cumulative voting scheme at the time, the removal would have near-guaranteed Romano's election. The Will County Court's initial decision to remove Perry from the ballot was overturned by the Illinois Supreme Court. In 1936, Perry was elected to the Illinois House of Representatives as a Democrat from the 41st district. He served from 1937 until 1943 and served as a floor leader for Governor Henry Horner. He served in the Illinois Militia from 1942 to 1944. In 1943, Perry returned to private law practice in Wheaton. After World War II, Perry was unsuccessful in efforts to be elected as a state senator and a congressman, largely because he was a Democrat in heavily Republican DuPage County. Perry remained a lawyer in Wheaton until he became a federal judge in 1951. Perry also worked from 1949 until 1951 as DuPage County's public administrator.

He served as the Chairman of the Democratic Party of DuPage County for a time in the 1930s.

== Federal judicial service ==
Perry was nominated by President Harry S. Truman on July 13, 1951, to a seat on the United States District Court for the Northern District of Illinois vacated by Judge Elwyn Riley Shaw. He was confirmed by the United States Senate on August 21, 1951, and received his commission on August 22, 1951. He assumed senior status on November 29, 1971. His service terminated on February 18, 1984, due to his death.

=== Notable cases ===
During his tenure, Perry presided over a large number of high-profile trials, including an 18-month-long wrongful-death suit initiated by the survivors and family members of two members of the Black Panther Party who were killed during a 1969 raid on the group's headquarters. At the end of the trial, which at that time was the longest trial before a federal court jury in United States history, Perry dismissed all charges against law enforcement officials who had been sued for $47 million in a wrongful-death suit when jurors could not reach a verdict. The United States Court of Appeals for the Seventh Circuit eventually overturned Perry and ordered a new trial, but an out-of-court settlement eventually was reached. Perry presided over Harold Washington's trial for not filing taxes in which he was sympathetic to Washington's error.

Perry also presided over what has to be considered one of the most egregiously biased cases in the annals of the federal court system, the case in which the federal prosecutor in Chicago, conspired with the US Secret Service to silence by prosecution and conviction Abraham Bolden, the first Black ever to serve on the Secret Services presidential detail. Bolden's two trials, both in Perry's court, were characterized by testimony from convicts previously arrested by Bolden and by perjured testimony abetted if not instigated by Federal prosecutor Richard T. Sikes. In a hearing at the US Seventh Court of Appeals, when Sikes was given an opportunity to respond to a charge of suborning perjury, he took the Fifth Amendment. Records of Bolden's trial, appeals and other related papers were subsequently determined by the US National Archives to have "disappeared," having last been checked out by Perry's court, thus thwarting efforts to inquire into the highly irregular actions of Perry. (References: 10. "Re: Status of Abraham Bolden citation request 64," National Archives, CR 324; No. 14907. 11. Bolden, Abraham, The Echo From Dealey Plaza, Harmony Books, New York, 2008.

== Mastodon discovery ==
On October 16, 1963, a man named Marshall Erb (1910–1989) was excavating a pond in the back yard of Perry's house, at 683 Riford Road in Glen Ellyn, Illinois when Erb found a large, 42-inch bone. The bone was taken to a geologist at Wheaton College in nearby Wheaton, who judged it to be the fossilized bone of a prehistoric mastodon that became extinct more than 8,000 years ago. Diggers uncovered more bones, and Perry then gave Wheaton College permission to excavate the site. Geologists eventually found more than 100 of the mastodon's 211 bones, including the complete skull with well-preserved teeth. Geologists eventually reassembled the mastodon skeleton, and it is now on display at Wheaton College's Meyer Science Center.

The Forest Preserve District of DuPage County purchased much of Perry's 10-acre (40,000 m^{2}) estate in 1995 for $312,500.

== Death ==
Perry died on February 18, 1984, at Central DuPage Hospital in Winfield, Illinois. Perry was survived by his wife, Nelle, and two children.

== Sources ==
Legal offices
Preceded by Elwyn Riley Shaw	Judge of the United States District Court for the Northern District of Illinois; 1951–1971	Succeeded by William J. Bauer
