= Adam C. Cliffe =

American judge

Judge of the United States District Court for the Northern District of Illinois
- In office December 22, 1922 – June 12, 1928
- Appointed by: Warren G. Harding
- Preceded by: Seat established by 42 Stat. 837
- Succeeded by: Charles Edgar Woodward

Personal details
- Born: Adam C. Cliffe; June 25, 1869 Sycamore, Illinois
- Died: June 12, 1928 (aged 58)
- Education: Northwestern University Pritzker School of Law (LL.B.) read law

Adam C. Cliffe (June 25, 1869 – June 12, 1928) was a United States district judge of the United States District Court for the Northern District of Illinois.

== Education and career ==
Born in Sycamore, Illinois, Cliffe received a Bachelor of Laws from Northwestern University Pritzker School of Law, then read law to enter the bar in 1897. He was in private practice of law in Sycamore from 1897 to 1920, and was also a member of the Illinois House of Representatives and the Illinois Senate. From January 3, 1917, he was President of the Illinois Senate. From 1920 to 1923 he was a Circuit Judge of the 16th Judicial Circuit of Illinois.

== Federal judicial service ==
Cliffe was nominated by President Warren G. Harding on December 20, 1922, to the United States District Court for the Northern District of Illinois, to a new seat authorized by 42 Stat. 837. He was confirmed by the United States Senate on December 22, 1922, and received his commission the same day. His service terminated on June 12, 1928, due to his death.

== Sources ==
Legal offices
Preceded by Seat established by 42 Stat. 837	Judge of the United States District Court for the Northern District of Illinois; 1922–1928	Succeeded by Charles Edgar Woodward
