= Sherman Minton Supreme Court nomination =

- Nominee: Sherman Minton
- Nominated by: Harry S. Truman (president of the United States)
- Succeeding: Wiley Rutledge (associate justice)
- Date nominated: September 15, 1949
- Date confirmed: October 4, 1949
- Outcome: Confirmed by the U.S. Senate

Vote of the Senate Judiciary Committee
- Votes in favor: 9
- Votes against: 2
- Not voting: 1
- Result: Reported favorably

Senate vote on motion to return the nomination to committee
- Votes in favor: 21
- Votes against: 45
- Not voting: 30
- Result: Motion to recommit failed

Senate confirmation vote
- Votes in favor: 48
- Votes against: 16
- Not voting: 32
- Result: Confirmed

Sherman Minton was nominated to serve as an associate justice of the Supreme Court of the United States by U.S. President Harry S. Truman on September 14, 1949, after the death in office of Wiley Rutledge created a vacancy on the Supreme Court. Per the Constitution of the United States, Minton's nomination was subject to the advice and consent of the United States Senate, which holds the determinant power to confirm or reject nominations to the U.S. Supreme Court. The nomination was met with a mixed reception and faced active opposition stemming both from the belief that Minton would be a liberal justice and from his history as a New Deal-supporting member of the United States Senate. There was an unsuccessful effort to compel Minton to testify before the United States Senate Committee on the Judiciary. Nevertheless, the nomination was approved by a 48–16 vote of the United States Senate on October 4, 1949.

== Nomination ==
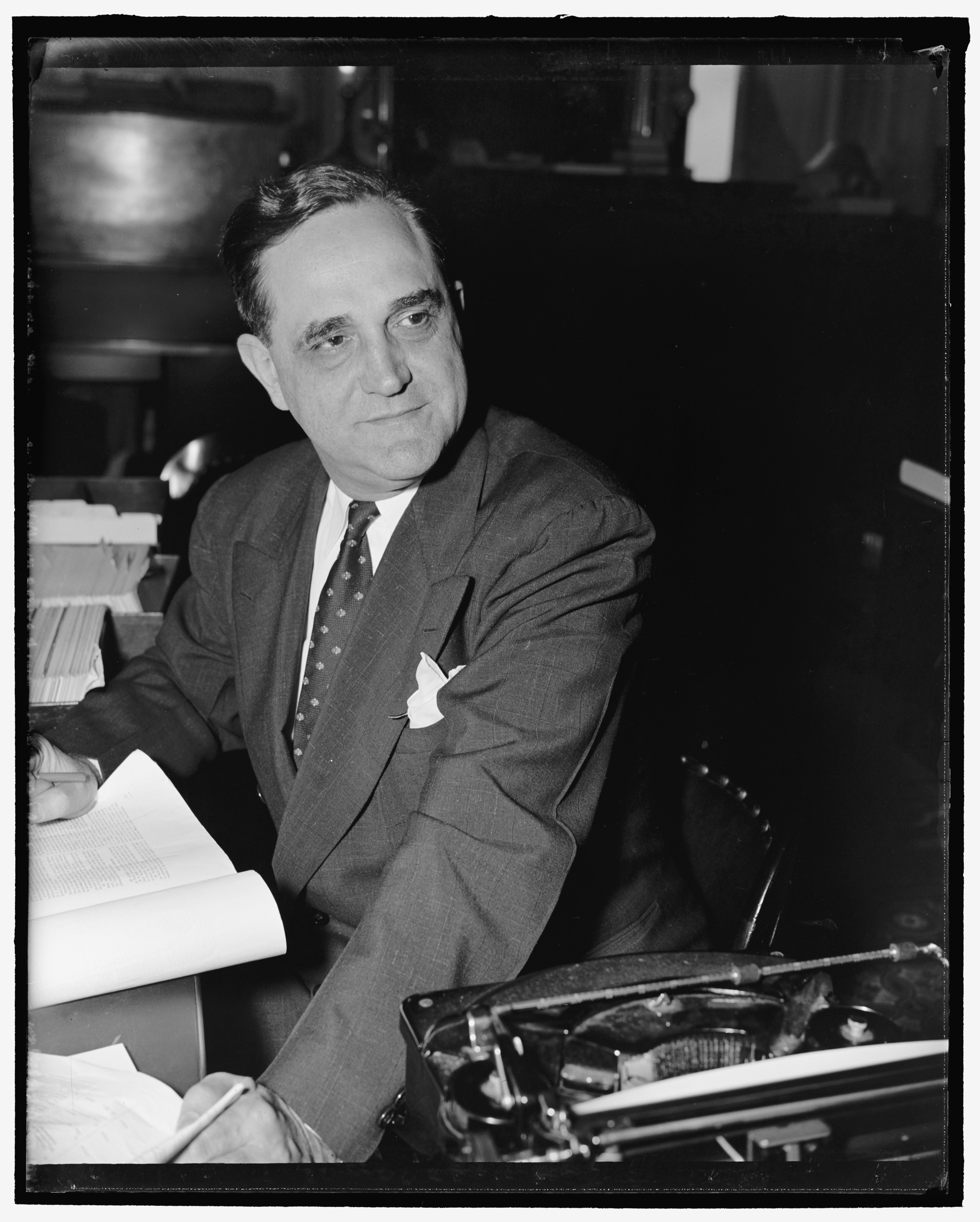
Minton photographed in 1940

At a September 15, 1949, news conference, Truman announced Minton's nomination to the Supreme Court, succeeding the late Justice Wiley Rutledge. Minton had already privately accepted the nomination several days earlier after a telephone conversation with Truman. Truman touted Minton's extensive law education and his years of experience on the circuit courts as the reason for his nomination. The Senate formally received the nomination that same day. Minton was the first United States Supreme Court nominee to come from the state of Indiana.

Minton had served eight years on the United States Court of Appeals for the Seventh Circuit after being appointed in 1941 by then-president Franklin D. Roosevelt. Before this he had served stints as an administrative assistant in Roosevelt's White House, a member of the United States Senate, and public counselor to the Indiana Public Service Commission. In the United States Senate, Minton's desk in the United States Senate Chamber was next to that of Truman's from 1935 until 1941, and the two had become close friends during this time. While Minton had previously been rumored as a potential appointee to a Cabinet post or a Supreme Court judgeship, Truman had previously declined to do so citing his desire not to overtax Minton due to Minton's health issues related to a heart condition and anemia.

During the long debate over Minton's appointment, criticism would largely focus on his partisanship, past support of the Judicial Procedures Reform Bill of 1937 court packing plan during his time in the Senate, and his poor health.

News of Minton's appointment received mixed reviews nationally. A great many city newspapers gave what The Cincinnati Enquirer characterized as a "chilly" response to the nomination, much of which,

Recalled his days as a fire-eating New Dealer and a legislator who sought to "muzzle the press" with a federal measure to provide stiff penalties for publishing "false" matter.

The New York Times said that Truman had allowed personal and political friendship to influence his choice. The New Republic said "the President is again reverting to his deplorable habit of choosing men for high post because they happen to be his friends...." The Washington Post raised questions about Minton's ability to be confirmed by the Senate due to the power many of his foes held in the body. The Indianapolis Star offered a more sympathetic opinion, pointing out Minton's qualifications and the pride Indiana could take in having a native on the Supreme Court. The article noted that he would be the most educated justice on the court, should he be confirmed. Another outlying sympathetic newspaper was The Courier-Journal, whose publisher had previously served with Minton on a federal government fact-finding board.

The Indianapolis News noted that speculation had quickly arisen that Minton might be a "liberal" justice. They contrasted this with Truman's previous nominated judges, which the newspaper described of having, "lined up generally with the middle-of-the-road majority." On this note, newspapers and other critics also negatively likened Minton's philosophy and background to that of Supreme Court Justice Hugo Black, Minton's former Senate colleague.

== Judiciary Committee review ==
As was long-standing standard procedure for Supreme Court nominations, the nomination was first referred to the Senate Committee on the Judiciary (Judiciary Committee) for review. Indiana Senator William E. Jenner led a push by opponents of Minton's nomination, including some of Minton's old foes, to bring him before the Senate Judiciary Committee for hearings. Minton wrote a letter to the Senate Judiciary Committee answering several of their questions, but refused to submit himself to a hearing. He mentioned his broken leg and hinted in his letter that it could be detrimental to his health to travel in his condition. He also stated that, as a sitting judge and former member of the Senate, it would be improper for him submit to a hearing. Minton responded to questions over his past support for the 1937 court packing scheme in the letter, declaring that as the Senate leader at the time of his scheme he had a right and duty to support the scheme, but as a federal judge his role had now changed to that of a referee rather than a player. The text of Minton's letter was made publicly available. Minton's nomination had faced intense questioning from Republican Senators on his past support for the failed 1937 court packing scheme. Although hearings had occurred irregularly in the past, it was not customary at that time to have a hearing on a nominee. During an absence of Jenner's, Minton's allies worked to have the hearing request dropped. The Judiciary Committee held a single public hearing without Minton's presence on September 27, 1949, on his nomination.

While the Senate Judiciary Committee had voted 5–4 to call for Minton to be questioned, one week later on October 3, 1949, they voted 9–3 to reverse this action and no longer call for it. The second vote saw the attendance of three Democratic members that had been absent from the earlier vote and also saw a fourth Democratic member switch his vote. After this, Senator Homer S. Ferguson (R– MI) angrily left the committee chamber and voiced his dissatisfaction to reporters that he would be unable to ask Minton questions he had intended to pose to him. The Judiciary Committee then proceeded to vote 9–2 to forward his nomination to the full Senate with a favorable report.

== Failed motion to recommit the nomination ==
On October 4, 1949, the Senate met to consider the nomination. Minton's opponents launched numerous delaying tactics and the Senate session before the vote to confirm Minton, which lasted until midnight. Opposition on the floor was led by Wayne Morse. Homer S. Ferguson was also key in these efforts. One of these tactics saw Senator Morse put forth a motion to have the nomination returned to committee. This motion failed, 45–21.

Vote to recommit the Minton nomination
October 4, 1949	Party		Total votes
October 4, 1949	Democratic	Republican	Total votes
Yea	2	19	21
Nay	36	9	45
Result: Motion defeated

== Confirmation vote ==
Minton confirmation was approved 48–16 in a vote held on October 4, 1949. Minton was thereafter sworn into office on October 12. To date, Minton remains the last member of Congress, sitting or former, to be appointed to the United States Supreme Court. He is also the only individual that was born in Indiana to be appointed to the court. Minton served on the court for seven years, before retiring on October 15, 1956.

Vote to confirm the Minton nomination
October 4, 1949	Party		Total votes
October 4, 1949	Democratic	Republican	Total votes
Yea	36	12	48
Nay	2	14	16
Result: Confirmed

== See also ==
- Harry S. Truman Supreme Court candidates
- List of federal judges appointed by Harry S. Truman
- List of nominations to the Supreme Court of the United States
