= Walter C. Peacock =

Chicago businessman

Walter Clarence Peacock (February 8, 1878 – September 9, 1946), was a Chicago businessman best known as the president of C. D. Peacock Jewelry Company, which was established by his father in 1837. Peacock was also a well known sportsman, particularly as a trap shooter; he won several national championships in this sport. He graduated from the University of Chicago.

== Sporting ==
Peacock was one of the founding members of the Lincoln Park Gun Club in Chicago. In 1931, he appeared in a live debate on WGN radio with the Chicago Tribune's outdoor editor, Bob Becker, covering perceived decreases in local waterfowl populations. In 1940, he began a movement to form the Civilian's Defense Reserve, a patriotic organization of armed civilians who would cooperate with the U.S. Army during times of need. He believed that the estimated 7 million trapshooters, hunters, and gun club members could help provide a third line of national defense. Peacock was also a previous Illinois Racing Commissioner and a member of the South Shore Country Club.
