= Irvington, Illinois =

Irvington
- Village
- Location of Irvington in Washington County, Illinois.
- Coordinates: 38°26′19″N 89°09′36″W
- Country: United States
- State: Illinois
- County: Washington

Area
  - Total: 1.02 sq mi (2.63 km^{2})
  - Land: 1.01 sq mi (2.61 km^{2})
  - Water: 0.0077 sq mi (0.02 km^{2})
- Elevation: 545 ft (166 m)

Population (2020)
  - Total: 581
  - Density: 575/sq mi (222.2/km^{2})
- Time zone: UTC-6 (CST)
  - Summer (DST): UTC-5 (CDT)
- ZIP code: 62848
- Area code: 618
- FIPS code: 17-37777
- GNIS ID: 2398277

Irvington is a village in Washington County, Illinois, United States. As of the 2020 census, Irvington had a population of 581.

== History ==
Irvington was named for Washington Irving.

== Geography ==
According to the 2010 census, Irvington has a total area of 1.036 square miles (2.68 km^{2}), of which 1.03 square miles (2.67 km^{2}) (or 99.42%) is land and 0.006 square miles (0.02 km^{2}) (or 0.58%) is water.

== Demographics ==
Historical population
Census	Pop.	Note	%±
1880	221		—
1900	240		—
1910	223		−7.1%
1920	258		15.7%
1930	344		33.3%
1940	418		21.5%
1950	379		−9.3%
1960	387		2.1%
1970	489		26.4%
1980	789		61.3%
1990	827		4.8%
2000	736		−11.0%
2010	659		−10.5%
2020	581		−11.8%
U.S. Decennial Census

As of the census of 2000, there were 736 people, 282 households, and 208 families residing in the village. The population density was 878.6 inhabitants per square mile (339.2/km^{2}). There were 310 housing units at an average density of 370.1 per square mile (142.9/km^{2}). The racial makeup of the village was 97.42% White, 0.41% African American, 0.41% Native American, 0.54% Asian, and 1.22% from two or more races. Hispanic or Latino of any race were 0.54% of the population.

There were 282 households, out of which 38.7% had children under the age of 18 living with them, 58.5% were married couples living together, 9.9% had a female householder with no husband present, and 26.2% were non-families. 21.6% of all households were made up of individuals, and 11.7% had someone living alone who was 65 years of age or older. The average household size was 2.61 and the average family size was 3.03.

In the village, the population was spread out, with 28.9% under the age of 18, 9.0% from 18 to 24, 27.9% from 25 to 44, 21.5% from 45 to 64, and 12.8% who were 65 years of age or older. The median age was 34 years. For every 100 females, there were 102.8 males. For every 100 females age 18 and over, there were 92.3 males.

The median income for a household in the village was $41,875, and the median income for a family was $51,250. Males had a median income of $37,422 versus $22,632 for females. The per capita income for the village was $16,541. About 7.5% of families and 9.0% of the population were below the poverty line, including 10.4% of those under age 18 and 6.9% of those age 65 or over.

== Notable person ==
- June C. Smith, Chief Justice of the Illinois Supreme Court, was born in Irvington.:

== Gallery ==
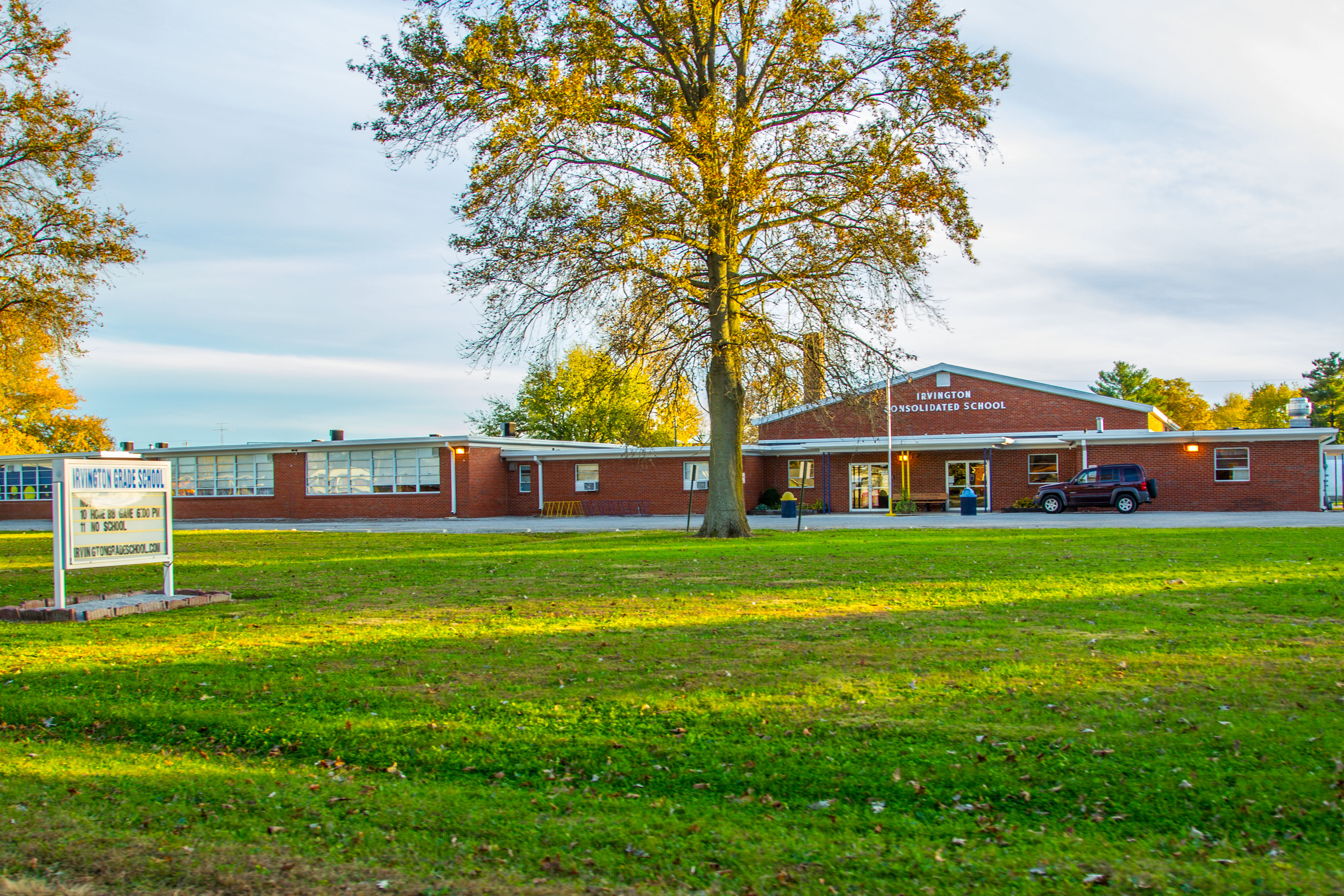
Irvington Illinois Gradeschool

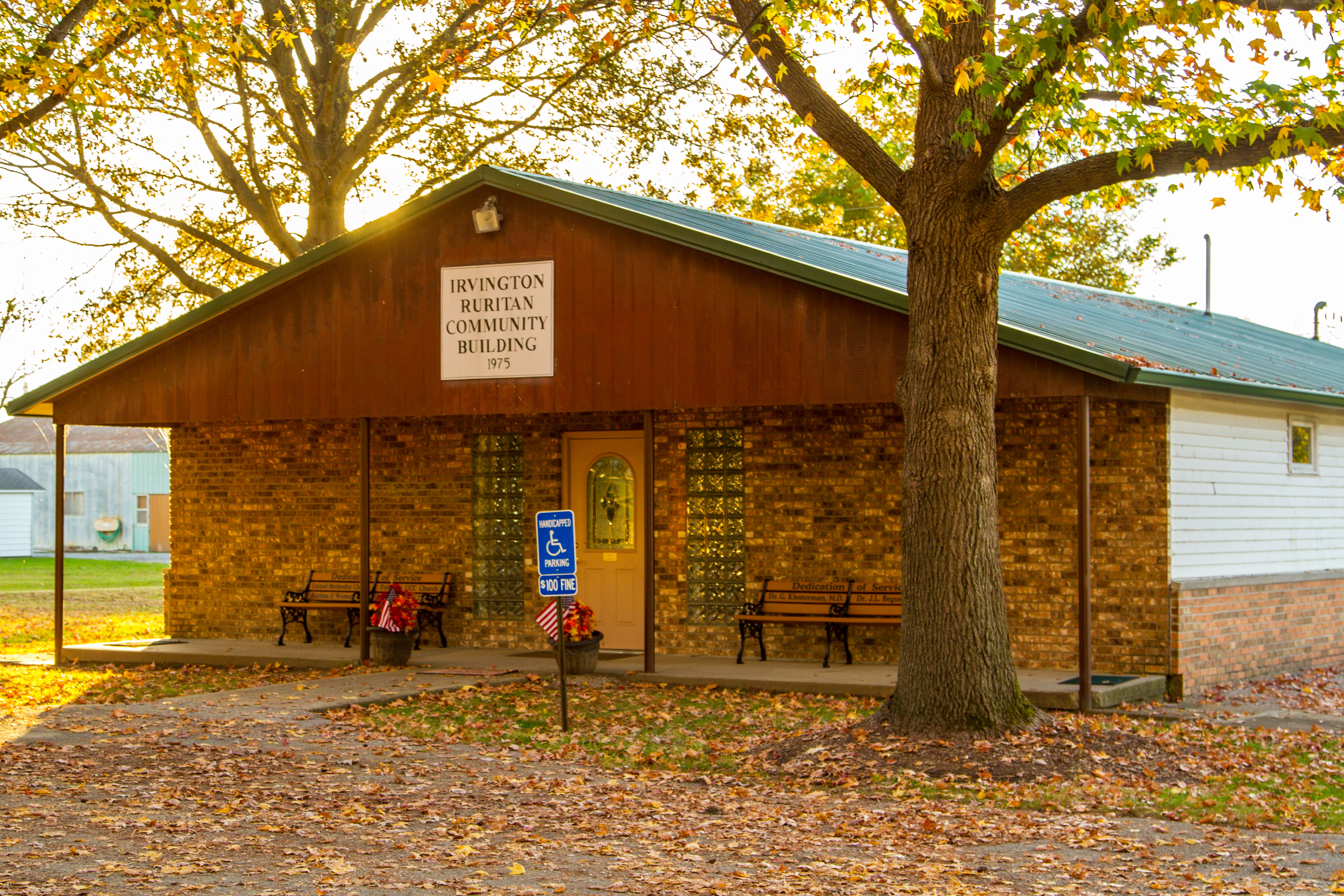
Irvington Illinois Ruritan Community Building

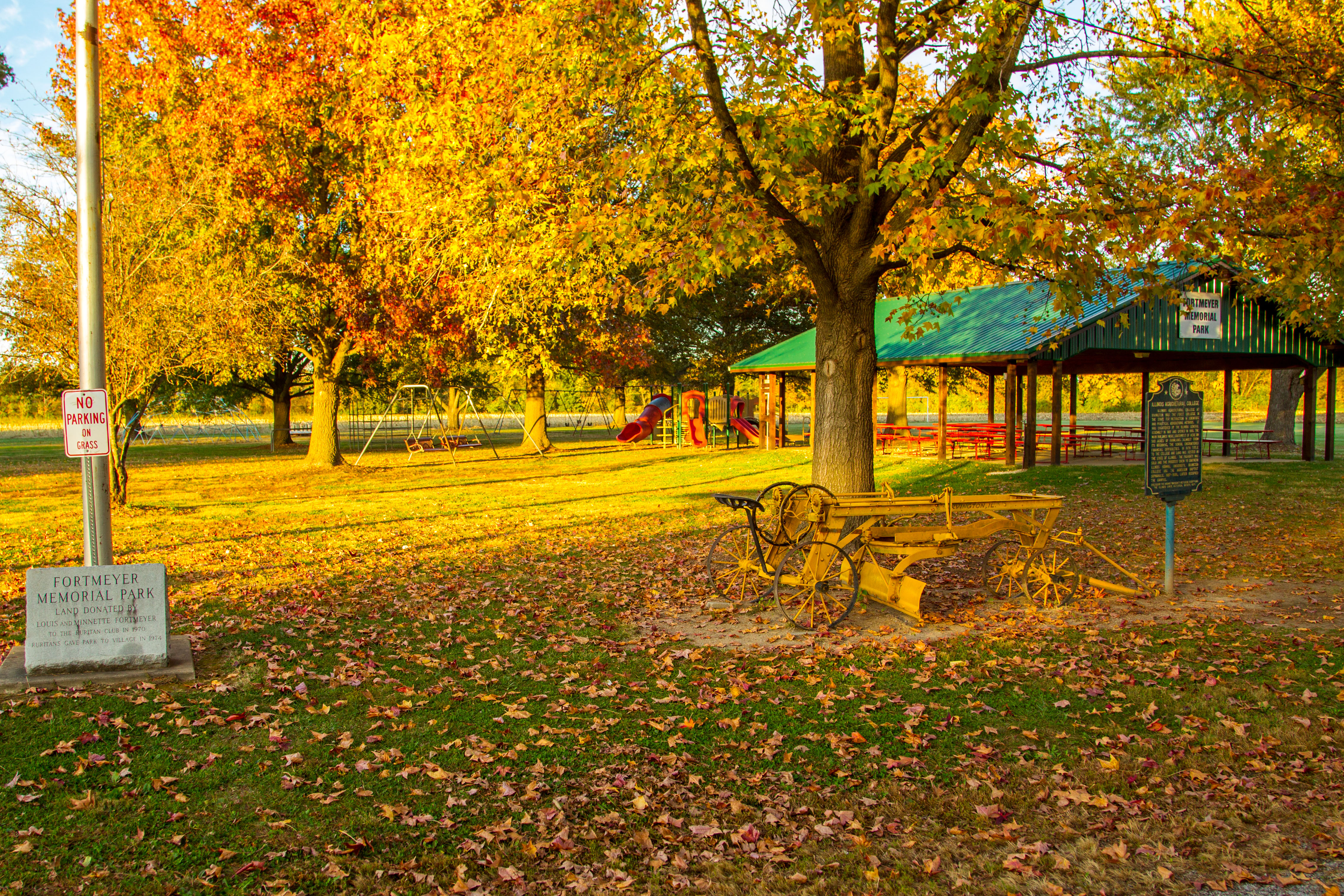
Irvington Illinois Fortmeyer Memorial Park
