= Lou Lowdermilk =

American baseball player (1887–1975)

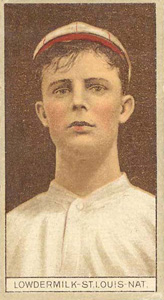
- Loudermilk in 1912
- Pitcher
- Born: February 23, 1887; Sandborn, Indiana, U.S.
- Died: December 27, 1975 (aged 88); Centralia, Illinois, U.S.
- Batted: Right Threw: Left

MLB debut
- April 23, 1911, for the St. Louis Cardinals

Last MLB appearance
- May 16, 1912, 1912, for the St. Louis Cardinals

MLB statistics
- Win–loss record: 4–5
- Earned run average: 3.38
- Strikeouts: 22
- Stats at Baseball Reference

Former teams
- Monmouth Browns (minor league)

Teams
- St. Louis Cardinals (1911–1912)

Louis Bailey Lowdermilk (February 23, 1887 – December 27, 1975), was an American politician and a Major League Baseball pitcher who played in 1911 and 1912 with the St. Louis Cardinals. Lowdermilk had a 4–5 record with a 3.38 ERA, in 20 career games, in his two-year career.

Prior to major league baseball, he played for the minor league Monmouth Browns (Illinois-Missouri League) in 1908.

He was born in Sandborn, Indiana, and died in Centralia, Illinois. He was the brother of Grover Lowdermilk, who also played in Major League Baseball.

== Political career ==
Lowdermilk served as mayor of Odin, Illinois.

== Gallery ==
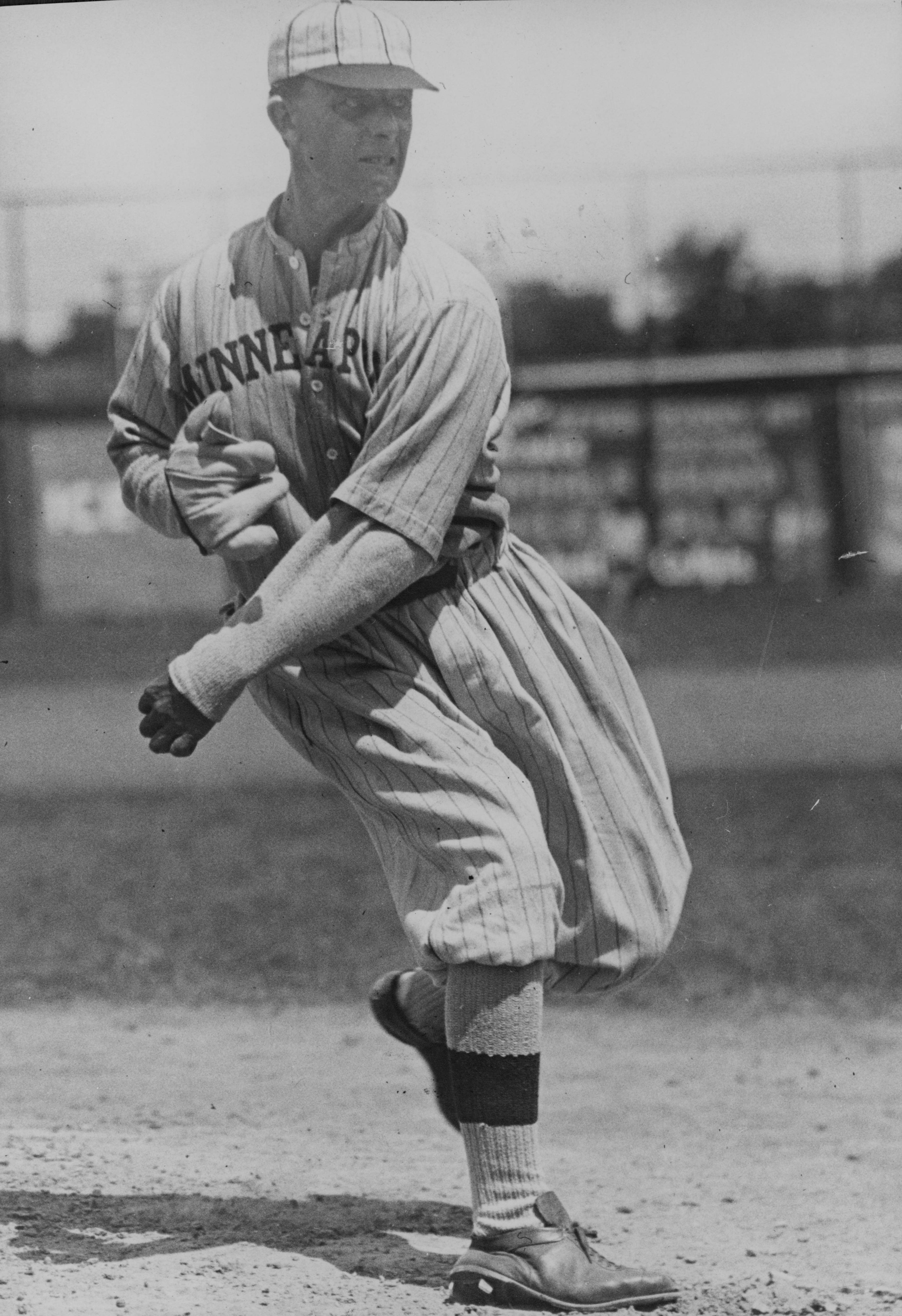
Lowdermilk with the minor league Minneapolis Millers, 1920s
