= Odin, Illinois =

- Village
- Location in Marion County, Illinois
- Coordinates: 38°37′15″N 89°03′11″W
- Country: United States
- State: Illinois
- County: Marion
- Township: Odin

Area
  - Total: 1.00 sq mi (2.60 km^{2})
  - Land: 1.00 sq mi (2.60 km^{2})
  - Water: 0 sq mi (0.00 km^{2})
- Elevation: 525 ft (160 m)

Population (2020)
  - Total: 935
  - Density: 932.0/sq mi (359.85/km^{2})
- Time zone: UTC-6 (CST)
  - Summer (DST): UTC-5 (CDT)
- ZIP code: 62870
- Area code: 618
- FIPS code: 17-55210
- GNIS ID: 2399560
- Website: www.odinishome.com

Odin is a village in Marion County, Illinois, United States. The population was 935 at the 2020 census, down from 1,076 in 2010.

== History ==
Odin originally was settled chiefly by Scandinavians. The village was named after Odin, a god in ancient Germanic tradition.

The Territory of Illinois was separated from that of Indiana in 1809. The newly appointed governor for this territory was Ninian Edwards, and the seat of government established at Kaskaskia. By an act of Congress in April 1818, Illinois was admitted to the Union as the twenty-second state, with Shadrach Bond the first governor.

Marion County was organized on January 24, 1823, and named for General Francis Marion, a hero of the Revolutionary War. Odin Township originally had the villages of Odin and Sandoval within its boundaries. However, in 1896 it was divided into Odin and Sandoval townships.

The hundredth anniversary of the village dates from the time the Illinois Central Railroad secured land grants in order to build the railroad from Chicago to Cairo. The land not needed for the railroad bed was later sold to interested farmers for eight to twelve dollars per acre. Payments could be made over a period of several years.

Thomas Deadmond, a Virginian, was Odin Township's first settler. He arrived in the timber in the southern part in 1827. The season was well advanced. He erected a shed-home with the roof slanted toward the north and the south wall left open. A log fire afforded warmth and a cooking area. Mr. Deadmond entered eighty acres in section 28 in January 1837.

Silas Barr came to the township in 1829. Two years later he entered the first tract of land in section 27. Soon his brother James N. Barr came from Tennessee. This was the father of Oliver Barr and grandfather of Hobart Barr. Samuel McClelland settled in 1830 near Silas Barr. Three brothers by the name of Wilburn settled here at an early date. James Adams, Thomas Pigg and John Hill were early settlers and were respected for their honesty.

All the farms in this locality were for many years confined to the timber but Bluford Deadmond ventured out into the prairie and selected a farm site near the center of the township.

Early settlers in the northern part of the township were G. L. Chitwood, John Davidson, John Puleston, John Vaugh and Silas Hurd.

The village is sixty-five miles from St. Louis, 244 miles from Chicago and situated at the crossing of the two railroads; Atlantic, Mississippi and Ohio Railroad and Illinois Central Railroad. It was incorporated as a town in 1865 and was placed under village organization in 1874. Its liveliest times were during the civil war when it possessed a record for robbers, gamblers, blacklegs and people of which could not be excelled. Since the civil war these people faded away and the town filled with a better class of people.

In 1960, Odin had 1,000 inhabitants, five churches and one or more soon to be built, a well graded public school, and a public library association. She had a brick and tile factory and was democratic by a small majority as is also Marion County. Several clubs were in town; Odin Lodge no 503, Odin Women's Relief Corps, American Legion Auxiliary, Old Maids Convention, Odin Fancy Work Club, Odin Dramatic Club, Odin Junior Women's Club, Odin PTA, Odin Woman's Garden Club, The Odin Fire Department.

Early business establishments included A. M Woodward General Store; J. M. Dace Confectionery; S. D. Phillips Drug Store; Hurd and Harroun Implement Shop; E. E. Hudson Paint Store; Eccles Brothers Bakery, E. A. Parks Jewelry Story; C. F. Krodell General Store; Scott Davidson Livery and Grains; C. O. Stanford Clothier; Wilson Dace Jeweler; Lewis Print Shop and Odin Newspaper; Barber Shops of Walter Turner and Charles Arrowsmith; Odin Bank with W. H. Farthing cashier; Tot's Hat Shop; T. H. McClelland Real Estate and Insurance; the Virginia, Moody and Kellar Hotels. The blacksmith shop operated by Henry Soulon. B. C. Holsapple opened a blacksmith shop in 1909; C E Sloan open the lumber yard. Post office was established in 1861.

=== Schools ===
The first regular school house built of logs stood near the McClelland graveyard. Odin School was held in the Smith Hall at one time for extra room, another time in the Schumaker Building, then later about 1898 or 1899 extra rooms were in the Presbyterian Church which stood a block west of the main school, still later in the wooden frame building across the street to the west. The average wage paid to teachers was $12.00 per month. In 1880 the average wage paid to male teachers was $37.15 and female teachers was $26.32 per month.

- Barr School 1834 located southeast corner of section 22 near Silas Barr's place The teacher was Peter Welburn.
- Brick School 1856 two miles north of Odin. In 1920 the building was torn down and replaced with a new frame building. At one time there were 70 kids enrolled and the teacher salary of $25.00 per month was paid.
- Rankin School in 1884 was deeded from Hamlin family and Ella Phillips was paid $30 a month in 1909 and $35 a month in 1915. Margaret Robinson made $60 per month in 1919 and Gladys McClelland was paid $75 a month in 1920. The price for teaching went to $80 in 1931 with Eunice Tinkler hired. Mary Hawley in 1940 and Virginia Scott in 1942 were paid $90 per month. 1952 the school was purchased by Ben Young and pupils were transported to other schools.
- Lakeview School (not sure what lake) was built in 1893
- Forest Park School, later called Love School was built in 1892
- Matthew school - 1896

Some school rules: No swearing on school grounds, no whispering and mind the teacher in all things.

=== Odin Coal Company ===
A mass convention of the citizens was called for the purpose of considering the propriety and manner of organizing a coal and mining company. The capital stock was placed at $25,000 and after four months of steady work and united efforts the entire amount of stock was taken without the assistance of outside capital. The mine commission consisted of W. H. Phillips, J. G. Vaughn, L. Somerville, F. D. Secor, W. H. Cole, W. E. Smith, N. B. Morrison, A. M. Woodard and E. Sharp; all prominent and influential citizens.

The company was incorporated under the laws of the state, and the contract for sinking the shaft was awarded to Messrs. Earls & Paul, mine contractors of Sandoval, Illinois. N. B. Morrison was president. Officially recorded as ISGS Index #87, Odin Coal Company, 1 Shaft, Method = Modified Room and Pillar (MRP), 1887–1939, Seam Mined = Herrin Twp 2N, Rge 1E, Sec 13.

Coal was expected at a depth of 600 feet and was not found until 669 feet in 1886. At that time the whistle at the shaft announced that coal had been found, bringing excitement to the town. A grand barbecue and picnic in honor of the event was held with Hon. William D. Farthing the committee chairman. 5000 people attended the celebration and had speeches from Gov. Oglesby, US Attorney G. Van Hoorbeke and others.

Odin Coal Co. pays machine men $2.00 per day, shooters the same, loaders 10 cents per day; 50 cents for screened coal and 35 cents for gross-weight coal. One of the customers of Odin CC was University of Illinois. In 1899, UofI board took the following action though.

The action of the committee was confirmed. Mr. Bullard offered the following resolution, which was adopted : WHEREAS, The Board through its Committee on Buildings and Grounds did invite proposals for coal for the university for the year beginning with September 1899; and WHEREAS, On the 16th day of August last bids were opened and the contract for furnishing fuel for the year was awarded to the Odin Coal Company on their proposal of $1.00 per ton for pea coal delivered f. o. b. cars in Champaign or Urbana—the lowest bid which was received—and WHEREAS, The said Odin Coal Company has failed repeatedly to furnish coal of the quantity and quality as stipulated; and WHEREAS, There is no forfeiture or penalty attached for failure to furnish coal by the said Odin Coal Company; therefore, be it Resolved, That the Committee on Buildings and Grounds is hereby instructed to make an additional contract for furnishing coal to the university for said year in such quantity and at such rates as it best can for the interests of the university, so that the university may not be compelled at any time to go into the market and buy coal at local market prices. Mr. Bullard read a proposition from the Sangamon Coal Company offering to furnish the university pea coal, two or three cars a week until April 1, at $1.20 per ton, f. o. b . cars Urbana or Champaign, and on his motion the proposition was accepted. The Secretary was instructed to notify the company of the acceptance of its proposition.

Dangers of the Mine: The mine worked for nine years before they had a fatal accident.

- In 1895 a windy shot caused an explosion. William Tadlock was killed and several were injured.
- In 1897, Fred F'elax, a loader in the Odin coal mine, was seriously injured by falling coal and died from the effects of it that same evening. He leaves a widow and four children. He was 48 years of age.
- In 1898 Charles Denman rode a cage with no guard protection to the top. The cage stopped a little high off the ground landing, it was dark and the lights were very poor. He stepped off and fell back in the shaft 700 feet to his death. His wife Ellie sued Odin CC and was awarded $2000 in 1899.
- In 1899, William Risinger was killed with a fall of slate.
- In 1900 Evert Turner, a mule driver, was caught between a prop and a car and was killed.
- In 1902 Louis Kirgan was killed with a fall of slate.
- In 1903 Greene Harris was killed also from a fall of slate.
- 1907 two men were killed within three days, Elmer Shinn was killed from a fall of slate and then Edmond Poole went back on a delayed shot and was killed.
- From 1907 to 1936 the mine had a national safety record working without a fatal accident.
- In 1936 James Bradley was killed with a fall of coal and rock. The mine had two bad mule barn fires. The first killing 18 of the 21 mules in 1906. The 1910 mule barn fire did not have any mules die.

From 1907 to 1936 the mine had a national safety record working without a fatal accident. James Bradley was killed in 1936 with a fall of coal and rock. The mine had two bad mule barn fires. The first killing 18 of the 21 mules in 1906. The 1910 mule barn fire did not have any mules die.

The Odin Mine was fully developed by 1902 with a tonnage of 1000 tons per eight hour day employing 200 men. The mine worked above average until 1924 when the old tipple burned. A modern tipple was built in 1925 but the tonnage dropped to 800 tons. By 1930 the depression was on. The coal business was so bad the company could not compete with the mines who had larger shafts and the mine went into receivership in 1936. The mine officially shut down in 1938.

== Geography ==
Odin is located in western Marion County U.S. Route 50 runs through the northern part of the village as Poplar Street, leading east 6 miles (10 km) to Salem, the county seat, and west 3 miles (5 km) to Sandoval.

According to the U.S. Census Bureau, Odin has a total area of 1.0 square mile (2.59 km^{2}), all land. The village is drained to the southwest by tributaries of Turkey Creek, which continues southwest to Crooked Creek, a west-flowing tributary of the Kaskaskia River.

== Demographics ==
Historical population
Census	Pop.	Note	%±
1880	724		—
1890	817		12.8%
1900	1,180		44.4%
1910	1,400		18.6%
1920	1,385		−1.1%
1930	1,204		−13.1%
1940	1,849		53.6%
1950	1,341		−27.5%
1960	1,242		−7.4%
1970	1,263		1.7%
1980	1,285		1.7%
1990	1,150		−10.5%
2000	1,122		−2.4%
2010	1,076		−4.1%
2020	935		−13.1%
U.S. Decennial Census

As of the census of 2000, there were 1,122 people, 440 households, and 293 families residing in the village. The population density was 1,110.8 inhabitants per square mile (428.9/km^{2}). There were 485 housing units at an average density of 480.2 per square mile (185.4/km^{2}). The racial makeup of the village was 98.48% White, 0.62% African American, 0.09% Native American, 0.09% Asian, 0.09% Pacific Islander, 0.09% from other races, and 0.53% from two or more races. Hispanic or Latino of any race were 0.80% of the population.

There were 440 households, out of which 34.5% had children under the age of 18 living with them, 48.6% were married couples living together, 12.7% had a female householder with no husband present, and 33.2% were non-families. 30.9% of all households were made up of individuals, and 13.0% had someone living alone who was 65 years of age or older. The average household size was 2.37 and the average family size was 2.92.

In the village, the population was spread out, with 25.2% under the age of 18, 9.0% from 18 to 24, 26.0% from 25 to 44, 20.0% from 45 to 64, and 19.8% who were 65 years of age or older. The median age was 39 years. For every 100 females, there were 83.3 males. For every 100 females age 18 and over, there were 81.2 males.

The median income for a household in the village was $32,019, and the median income for a family was $38,400. Males had a median income of $30,147 versus $22,500 for females. The per capita income for the village was $14,814. About 8.6% of families and 11.7% of the population were below the poverty line, including 18.3% of those under age 18 and 5.9% of those age 65 or over.

== Notable people ==
- Paul Farthing, Chief Justice of the Illinois Supreme Court; born in Odin
- Chuck Hawley, player and manager in minor league baseball (1936–1954)
- Grover Lowdermilk (aka Slim), pitcher with several Major League Baseball teams
- Lou Lowdermilk, pitcher with the St. Louis Cardinals (1911–1912); mayor of Odin
