= Sewell Avery =

American businessman (1874–1960)

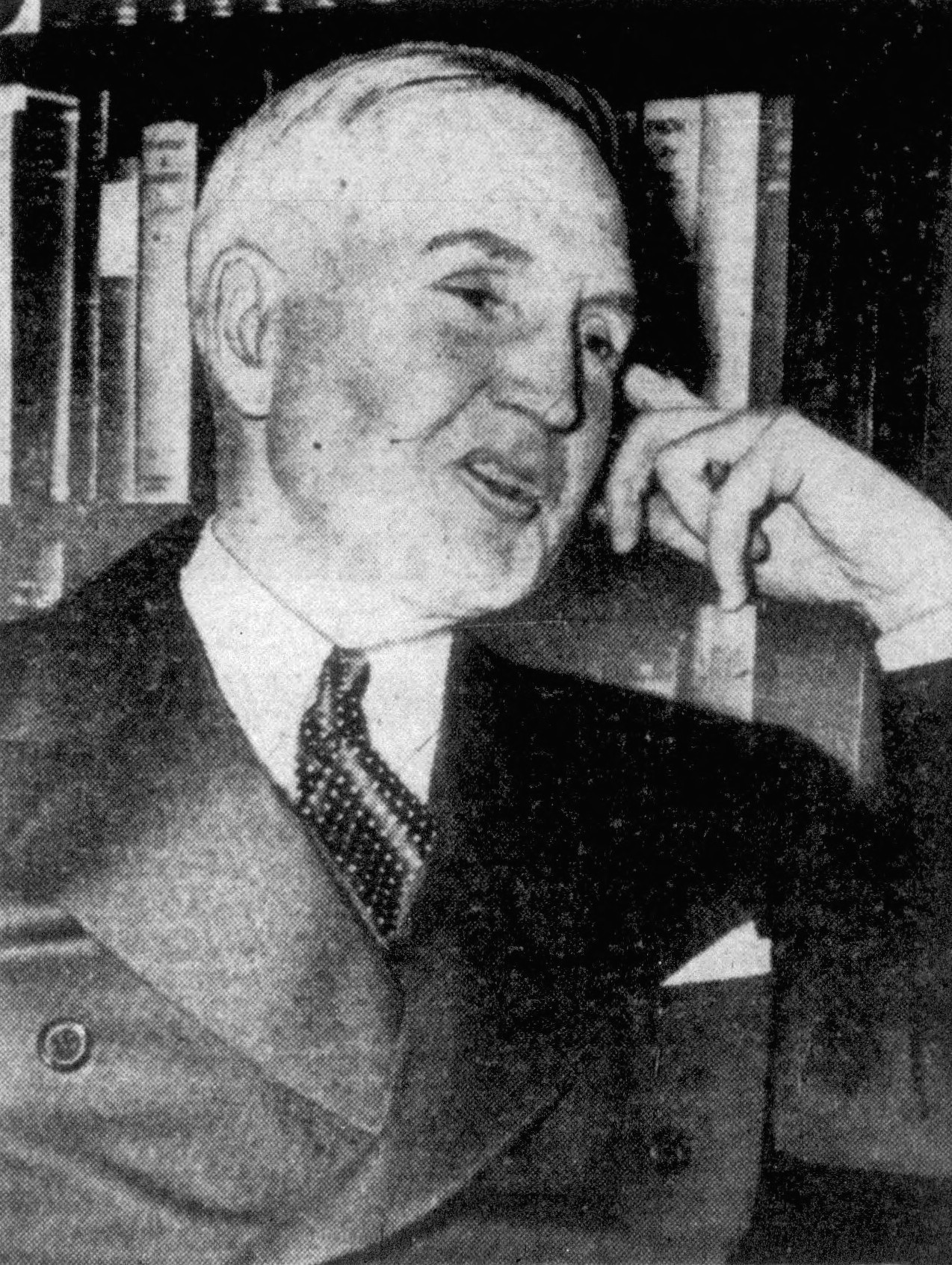
- Avery, circa 1949
- Born: Sewell Lee Avery; November 4, 1874; Saginaw, Michigan, U.S.
- Died: October 31, 1960 (aged 85); Chicago, Illinois, U.S.
- Occupation: Businessman
- Spouse: Hortense Lenore Wisner (m. 1873–1957)
- Children: 3

Sewell Lee Avery (November 4, 1874 – October 31, 1960) was an American businessman who achieved early prominence in gypsum mining and became president of the United States Gypsum Company (1905–1936). At the beginning of the Depression, he was asked by J.P. Morgan & Co. to turn around the failing Montgomery Ward and succeeded in restoring its profitability by making huge changes. In 1936, Fortune magazine said that Avery was "generally held to be the No. 1 Chicago businessman." In the postwar years, however, he failed to take advantage of the demand for durable goods and did not expand Montgomery Ward, costing it prominence in the retail field.

Avery was active in Chicago civil activities, for instance, supporting the Commercial Club's plan for a Museum of Science and Industry and serving as its first president. He was also prominent in social circles, and in 1912 founded the private Lincoln Park Gun Club with Oscar F. Mayer, Philip K. Wrigley, and other prominent Chicagoans.

== Early life and education ==
Sewell Lee Avery was born in Saginaw, Michigan as the son of Ellen Lee and Waldo A. Avery, who were a leading business family of the region, with interests in lumber, banking and mining. His father's family were considered lumber barons. Avery attended public schools in Saginaw and Detroit, and the Michigan Military Academy. He earned a bachelor of laws degree in 1894 from the University of Michigan.

== Marriage and family ==
Avery married Hortense Lenore Wisner soon after graduation. They started out in a small flat by the lake when he was taken on at a gypsum plant in Alabaster, Michigan. (His father was an investor in it and helped him get a start.) They had the first bathtub in town.

== Career ==
In 1894, his father gave him a role in managing a gypsum plant in a small town in Michigan. Avery changed the name to Alabaster Company, after the town, because he liked the sound of it. This was one of several companies that in 1901 became part of the consolidated gypsum concern United States Gypsum Company. Then working as a sales manager in Buffalo, Avery became president in 1905. He kept that position until 1936, managing the company through extended growth. After that, he served as chairman of the company until 1951. With his brother Waldo Avery, he was a 3.6% stakeholder in USG.

Noticing his success, J. P. Morgan & Co. invited him on to the board of US Steel in 1931. That same year, at the beginning of the Depression, Morgan & Co. invited Avery to take on the challenge of re-establishing the profitability of Montgomery Ward, of which it owned a majority, offering Avery a generous salary and stock options. After rapid expansion of retail outlets through the 1920s, from 10 stores in 1926 to 554 in 1930, it was rapidly losing money. Avery began as chairman by cost cutting and closing stores, replacing catalog managers with experienced chain-store managers, and reducing lines that were losing money.

He was admired; an employee later said of this time:

I never saw such a mass movement forward in a business. Avery turned the place inside out, even to the fixtures and decorations. All the fellows were hustling and bustling to make the grade in a big way. Everyone wanted to get in there and pitch for the old man.

By making the company become profitable, Avery earned great wealth in the process through significant stock options. His strong control and caution worked against him as the company began to recover in the mid-1930s, when he might have allowed some expansion, but he believed the economy too fragile.

As president of the Commercial Club of Chicago, Avery supported Julius Rosenwald's idea for an industrial museum as early as 1925. Rosenwald had built up Sears, Roebuck as a strong competitor to Montgomery Ward. Avery followed up on his early support and served as the first president of the Museum of Science and Industry in Chicago.

He supported politically conservative causes. He was a financier of the American Liberty League and a national adviser for one of its front organizations, the Crusaders. Avery gave generously to the Church League of America (CLA). He was one of many successful businessmen who did not favor the New Deal of President Franklin D. Roosevelt.

Avery endowed several professorial chairs at the University of Chicago, and he financially supported research and expeditions of the Field Museum of Natural History. A species of venomous coral snake, Micrurus averyi, is named in his honor.

During World War II, Avery repeatedly opposed actions of Roosevelt's National War Labor Board and opposed labor unions. He resisted signing a contract after a union had won representation for 7,000 of Montgomery Ward's employees until twice ordered by Roosevelt. When Avery refused to settle a strike in 1944, endangering the delivery of essential goods, Roosevelt's administration used emergency measures to remove him from office and temporarily seize the company; in April 1944 two soldiers had to pick him up by an arm each and carry him out of his office. Avery yelled at the Attorney General, who had flown to meet with him and try to avert a showdown, "To hell with the government, you... New Dealer!"

Following the government's seizure of Montgomery Ward, Avery was asked his plans. He said:

... the government has been coercing both employers and employees to accept a brand of unionism which in all too many cases is engineered by people who are not employees of the plant ... these devices ... only appear to make workers free to choose, ... are a disguise for leading the nation into a government of dictators.

Soon back in charge of the retail company, Avery read widely on business. Fearing more depression after World War II, which had usually followed wars, he misread the postwar economy. Demand and available private money fed a rise in the retail business for durable goods. He continued his bearish position under the Harry S. Truman and Dwight D. Eisenhower administrations. Unlike Sears, Avery resisted pension plans, insurance and profit sharing with employees; he refused to spend money on company expansion. Soon Sears far outperformed Montgomery Ward; by 1951 it had more than double the business volume and had surpassed Montgomery Ward in retail stores, while Avery was prepared to weather a depression. Even after Avery resigned in 1954 as president, MW never regained its former position.

In 1955, Sewell retired with a fortune estimated at $327 million. He died in 1960, leaving an estate of $20 million (before taxes) to two daughters and seven grandchildren, according to filed inheritance tax returns.

== Legacy ==
In late 1946 or early 1947, Avery gave 100% of the copyrights of Rudolph the Red-Nosed Reindeer, a story his employee Robert Lewis May had written in 1939 for a company promotional assignment, back to May. During the time between 1939 and 1947, the story had quickly become a popular part of Montgomery Ward's annual promotional campaign, with over six million copies given away. Avery's relinquishment of the copyrights from Montgomery Ward to May resulted in May immediately publishing the story commercially for the first time as a popular children's book, and later, having his brother-in-law, songwriter Johnny Marks, create a song based on it, becoming one of the best selling songs in history. "Rudolph the Red-Nosed Reindeer" has since become a popular part of pop culture and Christmas tradition in many parts of the world.
