= Senator McClain =

Senator McClain may refer to:

- David McClain (Florida politician) (1933–2025), Florida State Senate
- Edward McClain (Alabama politician) (1940–2020), Alabama State Senate
- Stan McClain (born 1961), Florida State Senate

== See also ==
- Senator McLane (disambiguation)
