= Lincoln Park Gun Club =

The Lincoln Park Gun Club was a private (later public) gun club founded in 1912 by Oscar F. Mayer, W. C. Peacock, P. K. Wrigley, Sewell Avery, and other prominent Chicagoans. John Philip Sousa and his band performed at the clubhouse's dedication. The club was located in Chicago's Lincoln Park, near Diversey Harbor. The club was built and primarily operated for skeet shooting and trap shooting, with occasional waterfowl hunting. Its address was 2901 N. Lake Shore Drive.

In February 1991, then Illinois Attorney General Roland Burris sued the club for allegedly polluting the lake with lead shot. The lakefront had previously been dredged in 1947 to remove and gather the accumulated lead, with disputes taking place over who would benefit from its sale (500 tons of lead were recovered and lead was then selling for $300 a ton). The Chicago Park District, who owned the land where the gun club operated, immediately shut down the club until it could prove its activities were safe and also insisted it pay to have the lakefront dredged. Members charged that the shutdown was not due to pollution, but because of anti-gun bias.

The gun club filed suit against the park district; however their suit was dismissed. The following summer, most of the club's buildings were demolished by the park district.

In 1995, Park District Superintendent Forrest Claypool planned to reorganize the parks as quasi-private affairs, with private companies providing services on the property. That year, the gun club's former clubhouse reopened as a community center. The city had paid $500,000 two years prior for an analysis of the soil and sand where the club had operated; however the study, performed by the Illinois Environmental Protection Agency, determined that there was no pollution present, and that although there was a significant amount of lead shot and clay pigeons resting on the lake's bottom, it posed no health risk to humans or aquatic life.
