= Senator McLane (disambiguation) =

Louis McLane (1786–1857) was a U.S. senator from Delaware from 1827 to 1829. Senator McLane may also refer to:

- George R. McLane (1819–1855), Wisconsin State Senate
- John McLane (1852–1911), New Hampshire State Senate
- Mike McLane (fl. 2010s–present), Oregon State Senate
- Susan McLane (1929–2005), New Hampshire State Senate

== See also ==
- Senator McClain (disambiguation)
- Senator McLean (disambiguation)
