= Charles Edgar Woodward =

American judge (1876–1942)

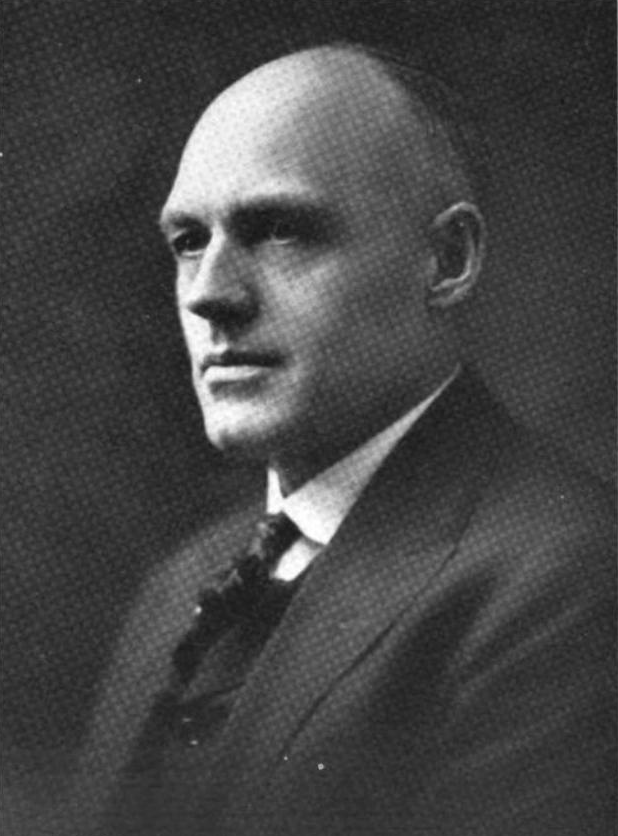

Judge of the United States District Court for the Northern District of Illinois
- In office March 2, 1929 – May 15, 1942
- Appointed by: Calvin Coolidge
- Preceded by: Adam C. Cliffe
- Succeeded by: Elwyn Riley Shaw

Personal details
- Born: Charles Edgar Woodward; December 1, 1876 New Salem, Pennsylvania
- Died: May 15, 1942 (aged 65)
- Education: Northwestern University; read law

Charles Edgar Woodward (December 1, 1876 – May 15, 1942) was a United States district judge of the United States District Court for the Northern District of Illinois.

== Education and career ==
Born in New Salem, Pennsylvania, Woodward attended Northwestern University and read law in 1899. He was in private practice in Ottawa, Illinois from 1899 to 1929, also serving as an assistant Attorney General of Illinois from 1905 to 1913, and President of the Illinois Constitutional Convention in 1920.

== Federal judicial service ==
On March 1, 1929, Woodward was nominated by President Calvin Coolidge to a seat on the United States District Court for the Northern District of Illinois vacated by Judge Adam C. Cliffe. Woodward was confirmed by the United States Senate on March 2, 1929, and received his commission the same day. He served in that capacity until his death on May 15, 1942.

== Sources ==
Legal offices
Preceded by Adam C. Cliffe	Judge of the United States District Court for the Northern District of Illinois; 1929–1942	Succeeded by Elwyn Riley Shaw
