= Senator McLin =

Senator McLin may refer to:

- Benjamin E. McLin (1851–1912), Florida State Senate
- Rhine McLin (born 1948), Ohio State Senate

== See also ==
- Senator McLean (disambiguation)
