= William J. Fulton =

American judge

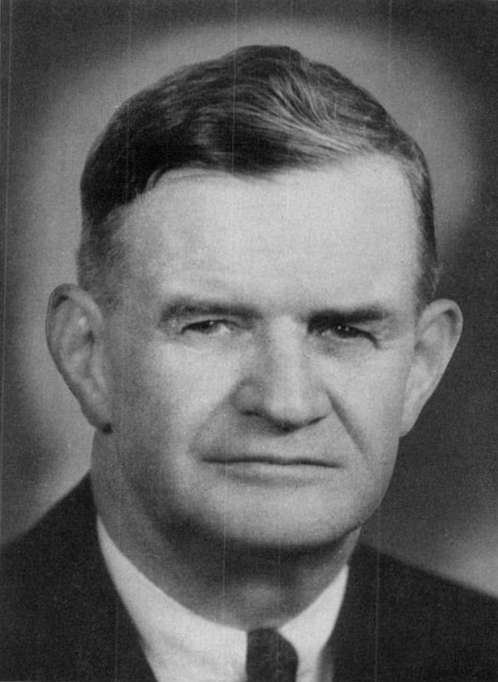

Chief Justice of the Illinois Supreme Court
- In office 1944–1945

Justice of the Illinois Supreme Court
- In office 1942–1953
- Preceded by: Elwyn Riley Shaw
- Succeeded by: Ray Klingbiel

Judge of the Illinois Court of Appeals
- In office 1943–1930

Circuit Court Judge for DeKalb County, Illinois
- In office 1923–1930

Personal details
- Born: January 14, 1875 Lynedoch, Ontario, Canada March 24, 1961 (aged 86)
- Died: Sycamore, Illinois
- Education: University of Illinois (B.S.); University of Illinois (J.D.)

William John Fulton (January 14, 1875 – March 24, 1961) was a Canadian-born American jurist. He became an Illinois lawyer and judge, serving as city attorney for Sycamore, Illinois, a circuit court judge for DeKalb County, Illinois, appeallate judge on the Illinois Court of Appeals, justice of the Illinois Supreme Court and Chief Judge of that court.

Born in Lynedoch, Ontario, Canada, Fulton emigrated with his parents to the United States in 1880 and settled in Illinois. Fulton went to school in Waterman, Illinois and Hartford City, Indiana. He then received his bachelor's degree and Juris Doctor degrees from the University of Illinois.

Admitted to the Illinois bar in 1901, Fulton practiced law in Sycamore, Illinois. He served as city attorney for Sycamore, Illinois and as master in chancery for DeKalb County, Illinois. In 1923, Fulton was elected a circuit court judge for the 16th circuit (DeKalb County). In 1930, he was elected an appellate judge from the 4th District of the Illinois Court of Appeals (later from the 3rd District). From 1942 until 1954, Fulton served on the Illinois Supreme Court, and was briefly chief justice of the court (1944-1945). Although re-elected in 1951, Justice Fulton retired in 1953. He died in a hospital in Sycamore, Illinois in 1961.

== Notes ==
Political offices
| Preceded by Elwyn Riley Shaw | Justice of the Illinois Supreme Court; 1944–1953 | Succeeded by Ray Klingbiel |
