= William H. MacLean =

American politician

Member of the Illinois Senate (7th District)
- In office 1910–1914
- Succeeded by: Frederick B. Roos

Member of the Illinois House of Representatives
- In office 1908–1910

Personal details
- Born: Quebec, Canada
- Party: Republican

William H. MacLean was an American politician who served as a member of the Illinois Senate and the Illinois House of Representatives.

He was born in Quebec, Canada. In 1908, he was elected to the Illinois House of Representatives; and in 1910 he was elected to the 7th District in the Illinois Senate covering Cook County, Illinois. He served one term and was succeeded by Frederick B. Roos.
