= June C. Smith =

American judge

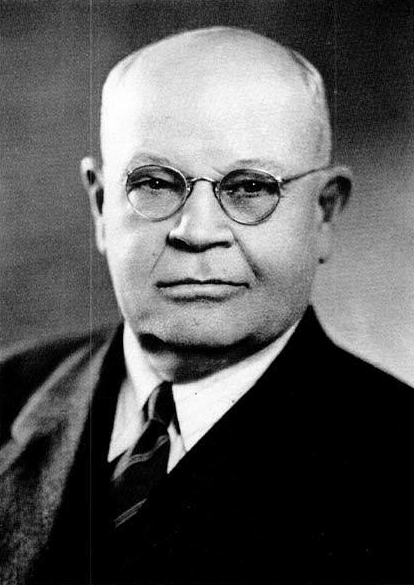
- Born: March 24, 1876; Irvington, Illinois
- Died: February 7, 1947 (aged 70); Centralia, Illinois

June C. Smith (March 24, 1876 – February 7, 1947) was an American jurist who served as justice of the Illinois Supreme Court from 1941 to 1947.

== Life ==
Born in Irvington, Washington County, Illinois, Smith received his law degree from Southern Normal University in Huntingdon, Tennessee in 1899. Smith was admitted to the Illinois bar in 1904 and practiced law in Centralia, Illinois. He was elected state's attorney for Marion County, Illinois and was assistant attorney general. Smith was a Republican. During World War I, Smith served in the United States Army. Smith served on the Illinois Supreme Court from 1941 to 1947 and was chief justice of the court. Smith died in a hospital in Centralia, Illinois.
