= Frederick B. Roos =

American lawyer, businessman and politician (1883-1942)

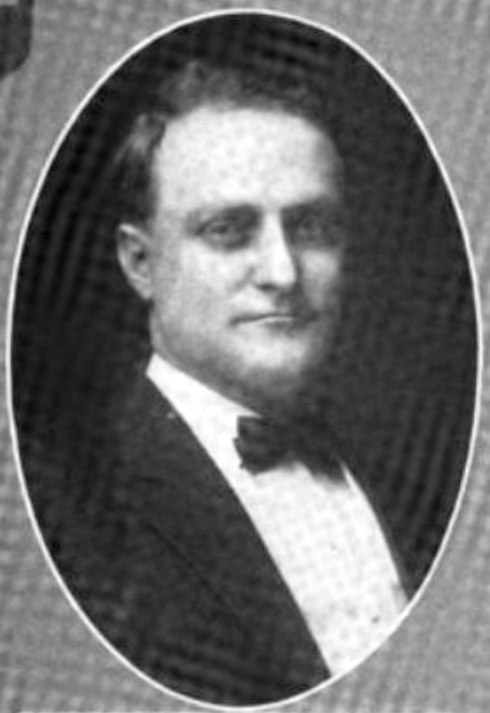

Member of the Illinois Senate (7th District)
- In office 1914–1928
- Preceded by: William H. MacLean

Member of the Illinois House of Representatives (7th District)
- In office 1906–1910

Personal details
- Born: Frederick Bernard Roos; November 22, 1883 Chicago, Illinois
- Died: May 13, 1942 (aged 58) Forest Park, Illinois
- Party: Republican
- Occupation: Lawyer, businessman, politician

Frederick Bernard Roos (November 22, 1883 – May 13, 1942) was an American lawyer and businessman.

== Biography ==
Roos was born in Chicago, Illinois. Roos was admitted to the Illinois bar in 1905 and practiced law in Chicago. Roos was also involved with the banking business. He lived in Forest Park, Illinois with his wife and family. Roos served in the 7th District in the Illinois House of Representatives from 1907 to 1909 and from 1911 to 1915. He also served in the 7th District in the Illinois Senate from 1915 to 1927. Roos was a Republican. Roos died at his home in Forest Park, Illinois.

In 1923, Roos unsuccessfully ran for the Superior Court of Cook County.
