= Oscar F. Mayer =

German-American entrepreneur

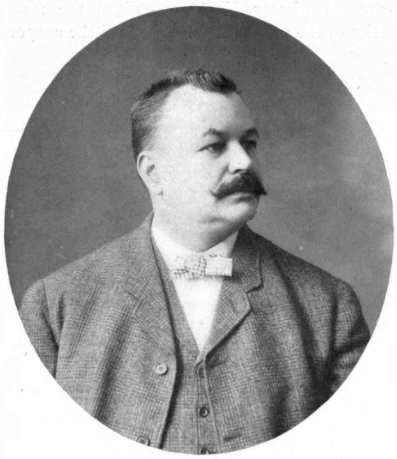
- Born: Oskar Ferdinand Mayer; March 29, 1859; Kösingen, Kingdom of Württemberg
- Died: March 11, 1955 (aged 95); Chicago, Illinois, U.S.
- Burial place: Rosehill Cemetery
- Occupation: Businessman
- Known for: Founder of Oscar Mayer
- Spouse: Louise Greiner (m. 1887)
- Children: 4 (including Oscar G. Mayer Sr.)

Oscar Ferdinand Mayer (March 29, 1859 – March 11, 1955) was a German American who founded the processed-meat firm Oscar Mayer that bears his name.

== Early life and career ==
Mayer was born in Kösingen (now part of Neresheim), in the Kingdom of Württemberg, where his family had been foresters and ministers for generations. While he was a child, Württemberg became part of the German Empire. In 1873 he emigrated to the United States and lived in Detroit with his cousin, John Schroll. He worked in that city's meat market and in 1876 moved to Chicago with the Schrolls. Mayer found work at Armour & Company in Chicago's North Side. In 1880, he shared his idea of starting his own meat business with his younger brother, Gottfried, who was back in Germany. He asked Gottfried to begin studying the sausage-making process. Meanwhile, Oscar began saving money for the venture. Three years later, he started a butcher and sausage-making shop of his own, when he was 24 years old, with his brothers Gottfried and Max. Five years later, the proprietor who owned the store refused to renew Mayer's lease, hoping that he could profit from Mayer's business success. Pushed out on his own, Mayer bought a property and constructed a two-story building for his business and family. In 1887 he married Louise Greiner, originally from Munich, and their only son, Oscar G. Mayer Sr. was born in that building.

With the company's continued growth, it became a sponsor of such events as polka bands and the German exhibition at the World's Columbian Exposition in 1893. The company had grown to 43 employees in 1900, offering meat delivered across the city of Chicago and its suburbs. Capitalizing on an industry trend, in 1904 the company started using its own brands for its meat products and was one of the earliest participants in the Food Safety and Inspection Service, created under the Federal Meat Inspection Act of 1906, to verify the contents of its products. By the time of his death, the business named after himself had grown to 9,000 employees, with facilities in Davenport, Iowa; Los Angeles; Madison, Wisconsin; and Philadelphia.

In 1912, Mayer founded the Lincoln Park Gun Club with Philip K. Wrigley, Sewell Avery, and other prominent Chicagoans.

== Death ==
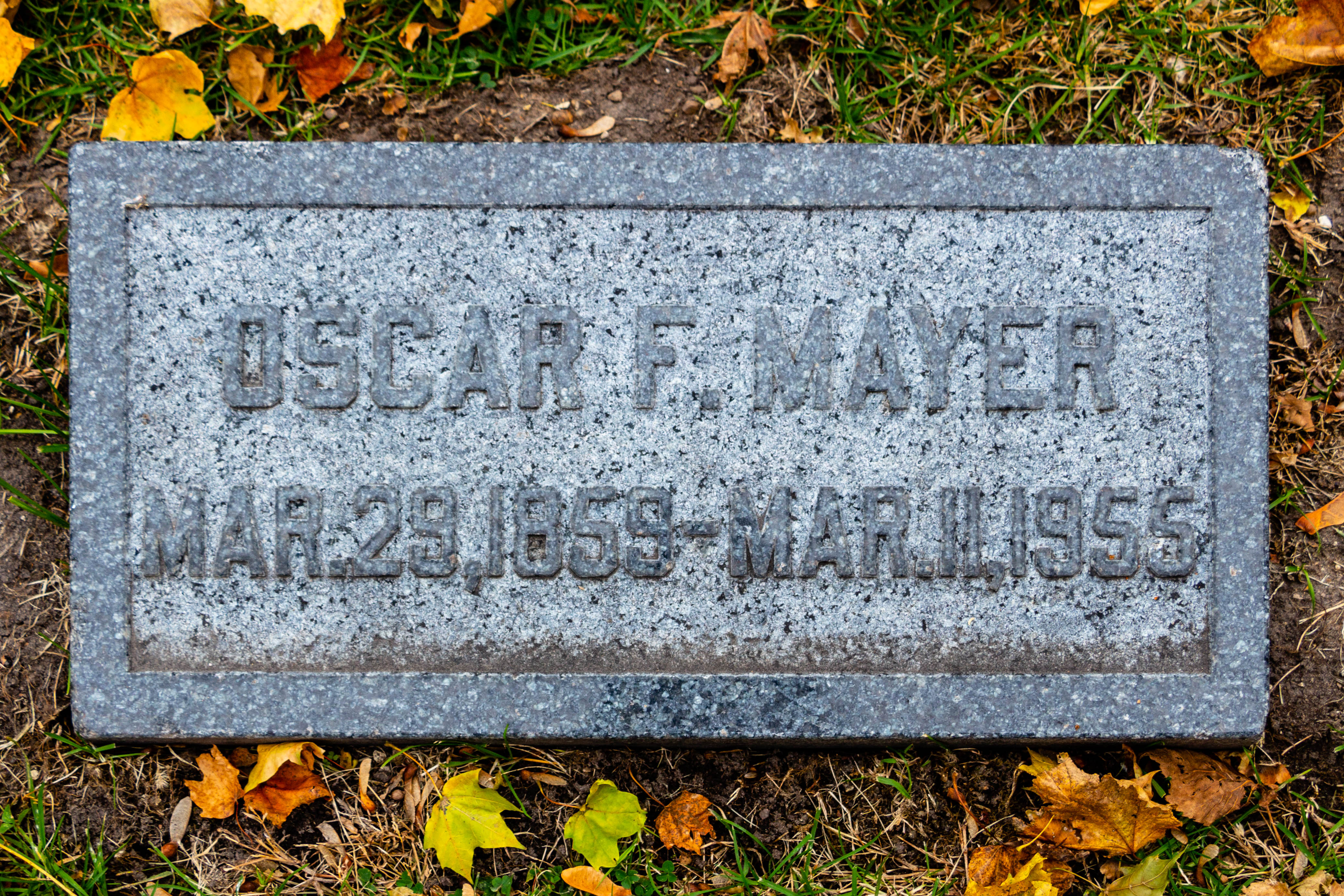
Gravestone of Oscar F. Mayer, Rosehill Cemetery, Chicago

After being ill for six weeks, he died in his sleep on March 11, 1955, at age 95, at his home, 5727 North Sheridan Road, in Chicago, with his son and successor Oscar G. Mayer Sr. and his three daughters at his bedside. His wife died in 1931.

His great-grandson Chuck Collins is an economist and philanthropist.
