= Senator McLean =

Senator McLean may refer to:

- George P. McLean (1857–1932), U.S. Senator from Connecticut from 1911 to 1929
- John McLean (Illinois politician) (1791–1830), U.S. Senator from Illinois from 1924 to 1925 and again from 1929 to 1930
- John McLean Jr. (1793–1858), New York State Senate

== See also ==
- Senator MacLean (disambiguation)
- Senator McLane (disambiguation)
- Senator McLin (disambiguation)
