= Elwyn R. Shaw =

American judge

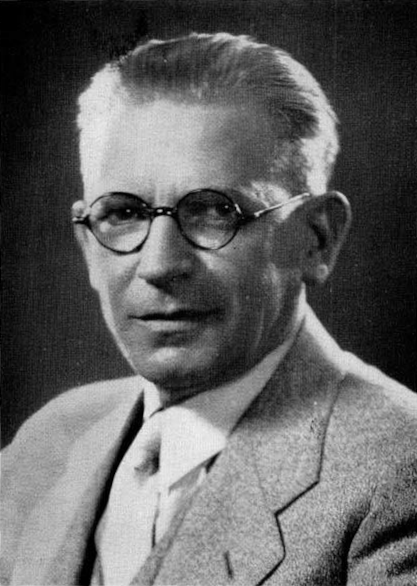

Judge of the United States District Court for the Northern District of Illinois
- In office May 9, 1944 – July 18, 1950
- Appointed by: Franklin D. Roosevelt
- Preceded by: Charles Edgar Woodward
- Succeeded by: Joseph Sam Perry

Justice of the Illinois Supreme Court
- In office 1933–1942
- Preceded by: Frank K. Dunn
- Succeeded by: William J. Fulton

Personal details
- Born: Elwyn Riley Shaw; October 19, 1888 Lyndon, Illinois
- Died: July 18, 1950 (aged 61)
- Party: Democratic
- Education: University of Michigan Law School (LL.B.)
- Occupation: lawyer, judge

Elwyn Riley Shaw (October 19, 1888 – July 18, 1950) was an Illinois lawyer and judge who served as a justice of the Illinois Supreme Court (1933–1942), United States district judge of the United States District Court for the Northern District of Illinois (1944–1950) and briefly as a member of National Railway Labor Panel in 1943.

== Early life and education ==
Born in Lyndon, Whiteside County, Illinois, Shaw received education locally in the public schools, then traveled to Ann Arbor, Michigan, where he received a Bachelor of Laws from the University of Michigan Law School in 1910, and immediately entered private practice in Illinois.

== Illinois lawyer and judge ==
After returning to Illinois and being admitted to the bar, Shaw would begin a private legal practice in the Rock River valley area in western Illinois based in Freeport, Stephenson County, Illinois that continued for three decades. A lifelong Democrat, Shaw was an alternate at the Democratic National Convention in 1932.

Following President Franklin Delano Roosevelt's landslide victory during the Great Depression, Shaw won election as a justice of the Supreme Court of Illinois. He served for nearly a decade (1933 to 1942), including as Chief Justice from 1938 to 1939. He was a member of the National Railway Labor Panel in 1943.

== Federal judicial service ==
On March 7, 1944, President Franklin D. Roosevelt nominated Saw to a seat on the United States District Court for the Northern District of Illinois vacated by the death of Judge Charles Edgar Woodward in 1942. The United States Senate confirmed on May 3, 1944, and Shaw received his commission on May 9, 1944. Shaw served in that capacity until his death on July 18, 1950.

== Sources ==
Legal offices
Preceded by Frank K. Dunn	Justice of the Illinois Supreme Court; 1933–1942	Succeeded by William J. Fulton
Preceded by Charles Edgar Woodward	Judge of the United States District Court for the Northern District of Illinois; 1944–1950	Succeeded by Joseph Sam Perry
