= Harry S. Truman Supreme Court candidates =

During his two terms in office, President Harry S. Truman appointed four members of the Supreme Court of the United States: Chief Justice Fred M. Vinson, Associate Justice Harold H. Burton, Associate Justice Tom C. Clark, and Associate Justice Sherman Minton.

== Harold Burton nomination ==
When Supreme Court Associate Justice Owen J. Roberts retired in 1945, Truman decided to appoint a Republican as a bipartisan gesture. Truman had first met Harold H. Burton in 1941, when Burton was elected to the United States Senate, where Truman was then serving. Burton served with Truman on the Senate investigative committee that oversaw the U.S. war effort during World War II, and the two got along well.

On September 19, 1945, Truman nominated Burton, who was unanimously confirmed by the United States Senate on the same day by voice vote, without hearing or debate.

== Fred Vinson nomination ==
Chief Justice Harlan F. Stone died in office on April 2, 1946. Rumors that Truman would appoint Robert H. Jackson as Stone's successor led several newspapers to investigate and report on a controversy between Justice Jackson and Justice Hugo Black arising from Black's refusal to recuse himself in Jewell Ridge Coal Corp. v. Local 6167, United Mine Workers (1945). Black and Douglas allegedly leaked to newspapers that they would resign if Jackson were appointed Chief Justice. On June 6, 1946, Truman nominated Fred M. Vinson, an old friend, as Stone's replacement. Vinson was confirmed by the United States Senate on June 20, 1946 by voice vote.

== Tom Clark nomination ==
The next vacancy occurred with the death of Justice Frank Murphy on July 19, 1949. On August 2, 1949, Truman nominated Attorney General Tom C. Clark. The New York Times called Clark "a personal and political friend [of Truman's] with no judicial experience and few demonstrated qualifications." Clark had held various position in the Justice Department during the Roosevelt Administration, and had met and become good friends with Truman during that time; when Truman became president, one of his first acts was to appoint Clark as Attorney General. After playing an active role in the effort to reelect Truman in 1948, Clark made clear to the White House that he was planning to return to Texas and the practice of law. Following Justice Murphy's sudden death, however, Truman nominated Clark to fill the vacancy, partly to bolster the majority of Chief Justice Fred Vinson, a former cabinet colleague and friend of Clark who, since his 1946 appointment by Truman, had failed to unify the Court.

Numerous attacks from across the political spectrum were leveled at the nomination. Allegations included charges of “cronyism” and a lack of judicial experience. Policy objections focused on Clark's work at the center of Truman’s anti-communist agenda and, specifically, the Attorney General’s List of Subversive Organizations. Former Roosevelt cabinet members Henry Wallace and Harold Ickes also leveled broadsides, for both personal and ideological reasons. Ickes said about Clark's nomination to the Court, "President Truman has not 'elevated' Tom C. Clark to the Supreme Court, he has degraded the Court." Nevertheless, Clark was confirmed by the United States Senate on August 18, 1949 by a vote of 73–8.

== Sherman Minton nomination ==
Truman's final opportunity to shape the Court came with the death of Wiley Blount Rutledge, also in 1949. Sherman Minton had previously served alongside Truman in the United States Senate, where the two had developed a close friendship. After Minton's 1940 Senate re-election bid had failed, President Roosevelt appointed him as a federal judge to the United States Court of Appeals for the Seventh Circuit. On September 15, 1949, Truman nominated Minton to the Supreme Court, and the nomination was confirmed by the United States Senate on October 4, 1949 by a vote of 48–16.

== Names mentioned ==
Following is a list of individuals who were mentioned in various news accounts and books as having been considered by Truman for a Supreme Court appointment:

=== United States Supreme Court (elevation to Chief Justice) ===
- Robert H. Jackson (1892–1954)

=== United States courts of appeals ===

- Court of Appeals for the First Circuit
  - Peter Woodbury (1899–1970)
- Court of Appeals for the Second Circuit
  - Harrie B. Chase (1889–1969)
- Court of Appeals for the Third Circuit
  - Herbert F. Goodrich (1889–1962)
- Court of Appeals for the Sixth Circuit
  - Florence E. Allen (1884–1966)
- Court of Appeals for the Seventh Circuit
  - Sherman Minton (1890–1965) – Former Senator from Indiana (nominated and confirmed)
- Court of Appeals for the Tenth Circuit
  - Sam G. Bratton (1888–1963)
  - Orie L. Phillips (1885–1974)

NOTE: At the time of Truman's presidency, the states of the Eleventh Circuit were part of the Fifth Circuit. The Eleventh Circuit was not created until 1981.

=== United States district courts ===
- John W. Delehant (1890–1972) – Judge, United States District Court for the District of Nebraska
- Raymond W. Starr (1888–1968) – Judge, United States District Court for the Western District of Michigan

=== State supreme courts ===
- Paul Farthing (1887–1976) – Chief Justice, Illinois Supreme Court

=== Executive branch officials ===
- Tom C. Clark (1899–1977) – United States Attorney General (nominated and confirmed)
- Charles H. Fahy (1892–1979) – Former United States Solicitor General under Roosevelt
- Robert P. Patterson (1891–1952) – United States Secretary of War
- Lewis B. Schwellenbach (1894–1948) – United States Secretary of Labor
- Fred M. Vinson (1890–1953) – United States Secretary of the Treasury (nominated and confirmed)

=== United States senators ===
- Warren R. Austin (1877–1962) – Senator from Vermont
- Harold H. Burton (1888–1964) – Senator from Ohio (nominated and confirmed)
- J. Howard McGrath (1903–1966) – Senator from Rhode Island

=== Other backgrounds ===
- Joseph B. Keenan (1888–1954) – Chief Prosecutor, Tokyo War Crimes Tribunal

== See also ==
- United States federal judge
- Judicial appointment history for United States federal courts
