= Francis S. Wilson =

American jurist (1872–1951)

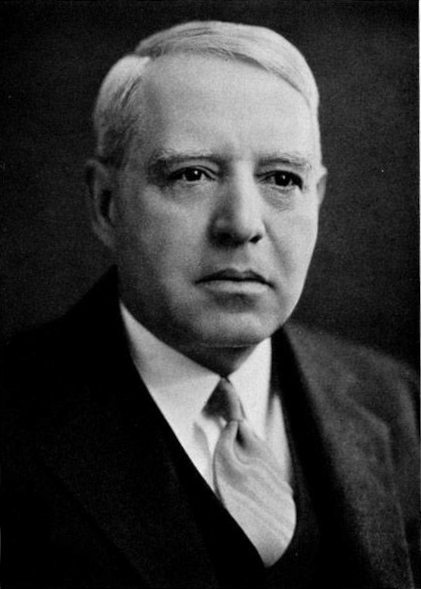

Justice of the Illinois Supreme Court
- In office 1935–1951
- Preceded by: Frederic R. DeYoung

Judge of the Illinois Appellate Court, First District
- In office 1920–1935

Personal details
- Born: February 7, 1872 Youngstown, Ohio
- Died: March 14, 1951 (aged 79) Springfield, Illinois
- Party: Democratic
- Spouse: Caroline Elizabeth Siegfried
- Education: Adelbert College of Western Reserve (B.A.); Western Reserve School of Law (J.D.)

Francis Servis Wilson (February 7, 1872 – March 14, 1951) was an American jurist.

Born in Youngstown, Ohio, Wilson attended Youngstown Public Schools for his early childhood education, prior to attending Western Reserve Academy prep school in Hudson, Ohio, graduating in 1890. Wilson's undergraduate was at Adelbert College of Western Reserve, known today as Case Western Reserve University, in Cleveland, Ohio, where he was a star college football player on several Western Reserve teams including their undefeated 1891 team. In early college football circles, he primarily went by Tug Wilson. He was also a member of Delta Kappa Epsilon. As part of the schools first graduating class, Wilson graduated from Western Reserve School of Law in 1895, being admitted to the Ohio bar shortly after in 1896. Wilson moved to Chicago, Illinois in 1897 where he practiced law. Wilson also worked as a county attorney for Cook County, Illinois. Wilson married Caroline Elizabeth Siegfried on November 18, 1903.

From 1903 to 1911, Wilson was partners in the firm of Darrow, Masters and Wilson with Clarence Darrow, the renowned trial lawyer, and Edgar Lee Masters, who later became a famous poet.

During World War I, Wilson served in the United States Army in the judge advocate general's department with the rank of major, including at Camp Sherman. In 1920, Wilson served in the Illinois circuit court and later on the Illinois Appellate Court.

Wilson was a Democrat, and successfully ran under his party's nomination in the July 1, 1935 special election to fill the seventh district seat on the Supreme Court of Illinois left vacant after the death in office of Frederic R. DeYoung. He was nominated at the Democratic Party judicial nomination convention held at Chicago's Morrison Hotel on May 12, 1935 at which the party also selected candidates for other coinciding Cook County judicial elections. Days later, his Republican opponent William V. Brothers withdrew from the race weeks later and De Young was left unopposed in the election. Brothers had been a compromise candidate nominated by his party without having himself sought to be nominated and who did desire to run. Ultimately, the Democratic and Republican Party's agreed on a bipartisan unity slate of candidates in the July 1, 1935 Cook County judicial elections making all of the races effectively uncontested, and forgoing the nomination of a replacement Republican candidate in the Supreme Court special election. Without an opponent on the ballot, Wilson was elected to the vacant judgeship by default.

Wilson served on the Illinois Supreme Court from 1935 until his death in 1951. He was the chief justice in 1939. Wilson died in Springfield, Illinois.
