= William Handlin =

American football coach (1885–1953)

Biographical details
- Born: April 11, 1885; Mount Pulaski, Illinois, U.S.
- Died: January 12, 1953 (aged 67); Lincoln, Illinois, U.S.
- Education: Illinois

Coaching career (HC unless noted)
- 1916: Pacific (OR)

Head coaching record
- Overall: 2–3

William Clyde Handlin (April 11, 1885 – January 12, 1953) was an American football coach. He served as the head football coach at Pacific University in Forest Grove, Oregon in 1916, compiling a record of 2–3. Handlin was a graduate of the University of Illinois and later served as the superintendent of schools at New Holland, Illinois. He taught science and coaches sports at Lincoln High School in Lincoln, Illinois from 1911 to 1916. After working overseas with the YMCA during World War I, Handlin return to Lincoln High School in 1919 as principal. He served in that capacity until his death there on January 12, 1953.

== Head coaching record ==
Year	Team	Overall	Conference	Standing	Bowl/playoffs
Pacific Badgers (Independent) (1916)
1916	Pacific	2–3			
Pacific:		2–3			
Total:		2–3			
