= 1927 Chicago mayoral election =

- April 5, 1927
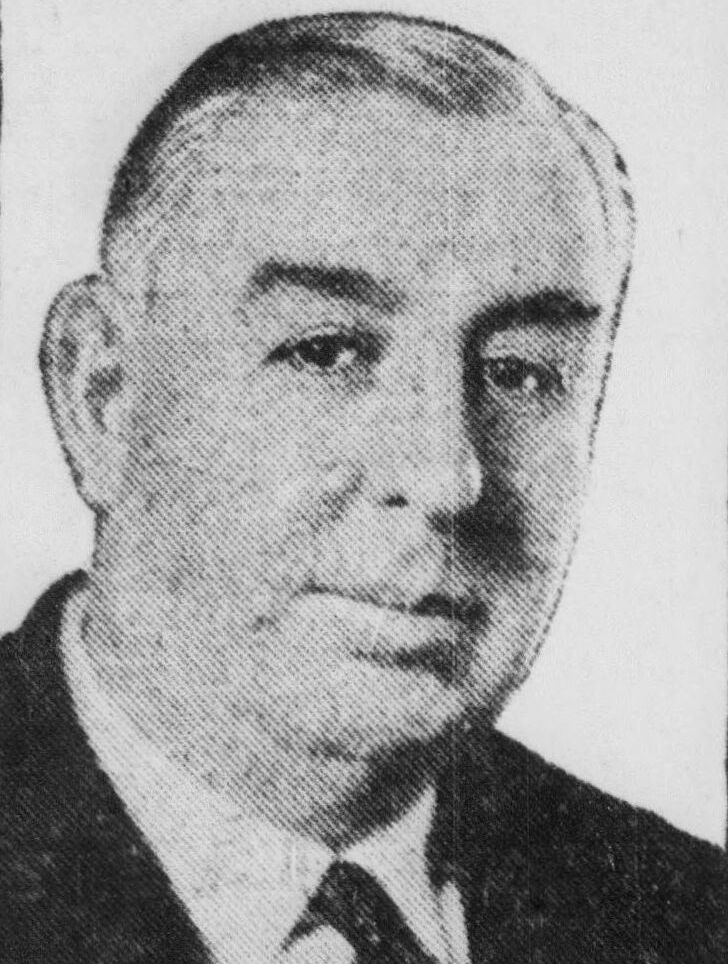

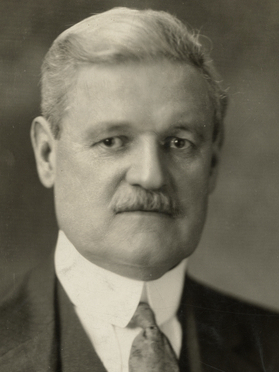

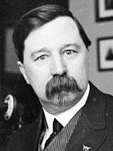
Nominee	William Hale Thompson	William Emmett Dever	John Dill Robertson
Party	Republican	Democratic	People's Ownership Smash Crime Rings
Popular vote	515,716	432,678	51,347
Percentage	51.6%	43.3%	5.1%
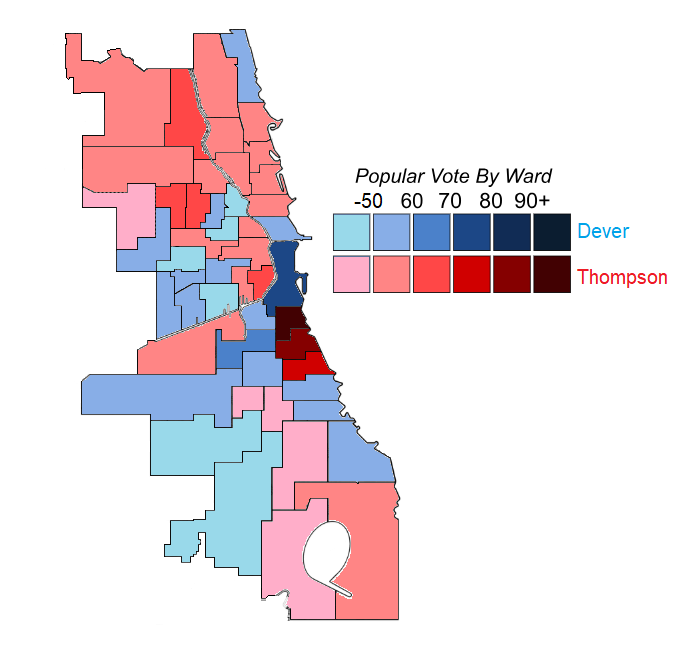
- Ward results
Mayor before election
William Emmett Dever
Democratic
Elected mayor
William Hale Thompson
Republican

The 1927 Chicago mayoral election was held on April 5, 1927. Democratic incumbent William Emmett Dever was defeated by Republican candidate William Hale Thompson, who had served as mayor from 1915 to 1923. John Dill Robertson (the president West Parks Board, as well as former health commissioner and school board president), who had been previously allied with the ex-mayor, broke with Thompson to run on his own and received more than five percent of the vote. It remains as of 2023 the last Chicago mayoral election to be won by a candidate who is not a member of the Democratic Party.

Dever had enforced Prohibition despite being personally opposed to it. This led to increased bootlegging and violence in the city and reduced citizen support. Thompson and Robertson seized the opportunity and entered the race. Thompson promised to end the enforcement of Prohibition and accused the United Kingdom of trying to retake control of the United States, while Robertson promised to quash the crime wave. Thompson bitterly attacked his campaign opponents and it was public knowledge that he was supported and funded by Al Capone. Dever's supporters pushed back against Thompson's rhetoric, asserting that Dever had the sensible policies and the "decency" appropriate for the city. Thompson's victory damaged Chicago's national reputation.

To receive the Democratic nomination, Dever won the party's primary election with 91 percent of the vote, facing only a single weak opponent. Thompson defeated Cook County Board of Review Chairman Edward R. Litsinger in the Republican primary by a 14.61-percent margin of victory.

== Background ==
Democrat William Emmett Dever had been elected mayor of Chicago in 1923 and initially focused on reform. Observing the corruption of city government caused by bootleggers, he resolved to crack down on the illegal liquor trade and strengthen enforcement of Prohibition. He was himself opposed to Prohibition, but felt that disregard for one law could lead to disregard for others. His crackdown on Prohibition was initially effective and led to him being considered a potential dark horse candidate for President of the United States. Nevertheless, the limited supply of alcohol led to bootleggers competing with one another, increasing violence in the city, lowering Chicagoans' approval of Dever's performance. Aware of the effects of Prohibition enforcement on his mayoralty, Dever was reluctant to run for a second term in 1927, a feeling strengthened by poor health and lucrative job offers in the private sector. George E. Brennan, chief of the Democratic party, felt that Dever was the Democrats' strongest candidate against Thompson, and he and businessman Julius Rosenwald convinced Dever to run for reelection.

Republican William Hale Thompson, known as "Big Bill", had been mayor for two terms from 1915 to 1923 and took advantage of the situation to run for a third term, promising to end the enforcement of Prohibition. Having declined a bid for reelection in 1923, he had managed to stay in the public eye by constructing a yawl named the Big Bill with his head as the figurehead and spending $25,000 (Note: $360,000 in 2018. Thompson split the cost with allies William Lorimer and George F. Harding.) to take it on an expedition to Borneo to find a tree-climbing fish, all ostensibly as a publicity stunt for the Illinois Waterway. He was immensely popular with the city's African-American community, having served as alderman of the 2nd ward, home of Chicago's largest black population, from 1900 to 1902. He also had enemies from his previous tenure, including the Chicago Tribune and the Chicago Daily News, and had started to wear out his welcome with former allies such as party boss Frederick Lundin.

West Parks Board President John Dill Robertson, also known as "J.D.", "Doctor Dill", and "Dill Pickle", who had previously been the city's health commissioner from 1915 to 1922, the President of the Chicago Board of Education after that, and an ally of Thompson, ran against Thompson in the Republican primary supported by Lundin. Serving at the time as President of the West Parks Board, (Note: One of 22 organizations that would be merged to form the Chicago Park District in 1934.) he promised to enforce Prohibition while it was still on the books and to smash organized crime in thirty days if elected, comparing gunmen gangs to boils and the bootleg industry to an appendix. Lundin later had Robertson withdraw from the Republican primary in order to campaign for candidate Edward R. Litsinger, and Robertson agreed not to run as an independent in the general election if Litsinger won the primary. Early in the campaign Thompson debated with live rats as stand-ins Robertson and Lundin.

== Primary elections ==
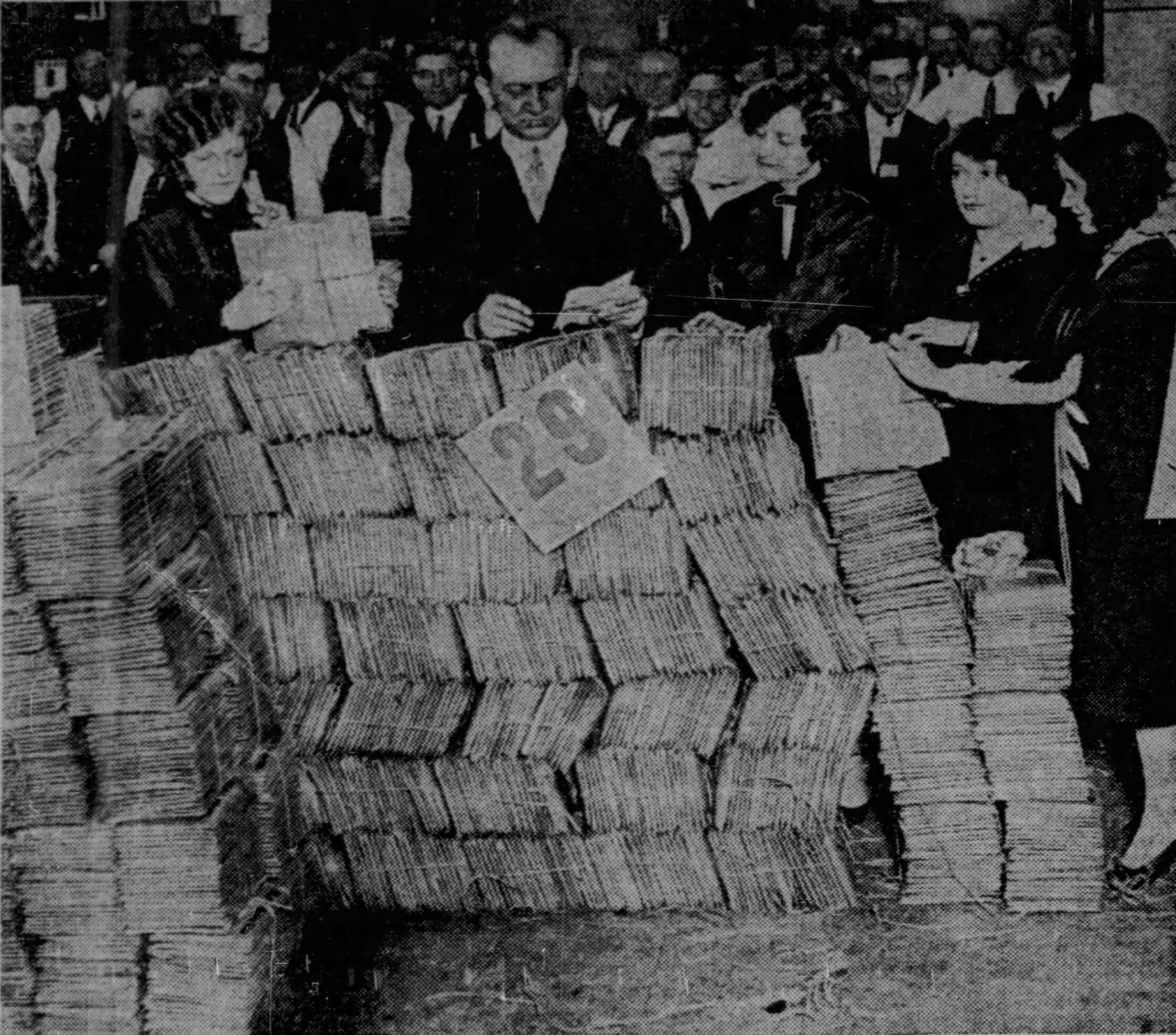
Officials sorting blank ballot papers in the offices of the Chicago Board of Elections ahead of the primaries

Primary elections took place on February 22, along with primary elections for City Clerk and City Treasurer and the first round of aldermanic elections. February 22 was incidentally Washington Day.

The primaries were plagued by electoral violence. The New York Times characterized the primaries as plagued by, "shootings, sluggings, theft of ballot boxes, police raids and the arrest of about two hundred gangesters and repeaters at the polls". The Associated Press provided a similar description. Ahead of the election, Cook County Highway Police Chief Michael Hughes came into conflict with General Superintendent of the Chicago Police Department Morgan Collins regarding election security. Hughes had ordered county highway police to supervise polls on the city's West Side. However, Collins then ordered the city police to arrest any county policemen found to be "loitering" around polling places.

=== Democratic primary ===
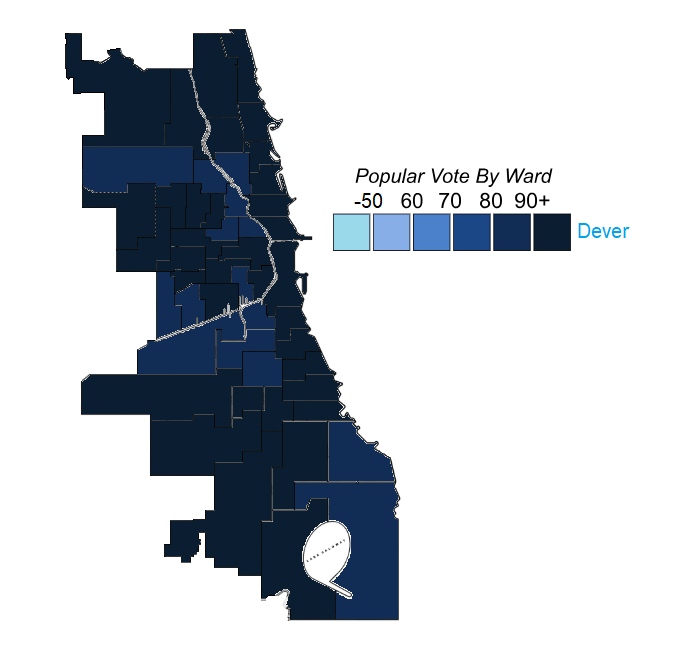
Results of the Democratic primary by ward

Dever faced no genuine opposition in his party's primary. Attorney Martin Walsh of the 27th ward filed on February 2, claiming to have the backing of "the old municipal ownership leaders" and joining the race "to give Mayor Dever a little exercise." Barratt O'Hara, former lieutenant governor of Illinois, withdrew from the race on February 11, claiming that running against Dever was hopeless and that he expected that Democrats opposed to Dever would vote in the Republican primary for Thompson instead of voting in the Democratic primary.

Ahead of the primary election day, Dever put up a confident face, touting his leadership and his prospects for the general election, remarking,

Chicago is well worth saving. I am not going to spare anyone, but I will hold up to ridicule those who have done so much to make this city a laughing stock of the world. The time has come for plain talk. I don't care a snap of my finger who is nominated on the Republican side. Whoever it is in for the biggest and best beating a candidate ever got in this city.

Dever touted as successes of his mayoral term the construction of a large number of new school buildings, the construction of Wacker Drive, the construction of new bridges, road paving projects, river-straightening projects on the Chicago River, and street lighting installation.

Although he overwhelmingly defeated his token opponent, winning all the wards and securing the citywide vote by more than 10 to 1, Dever's vote total in the Democratic primary was less than the margin of victory Thompson had secured in the Republican primary. Dever's camp argued that this was not a bad omen but rather that, due to the lack of a competitive race in the Democratic primary, many of Dever's supporters either did not participate in the primaries or voted instead for Thompson in the Republican primary to try and nominate the weaker prospective opponent. Dever anticipated that he would still be able to win reelection with more than 600,000 votes in the general election.

Mayor of Chicago 1927 (Democratic Primary)
Party	Candidate	Votes	%
Democratic	William Emmett Dever (incumbent)	149,422	91.85
Democratic	Martin Walsh	13,260	8.15
Total votes		162,682	100.00

=== Republican primary ===
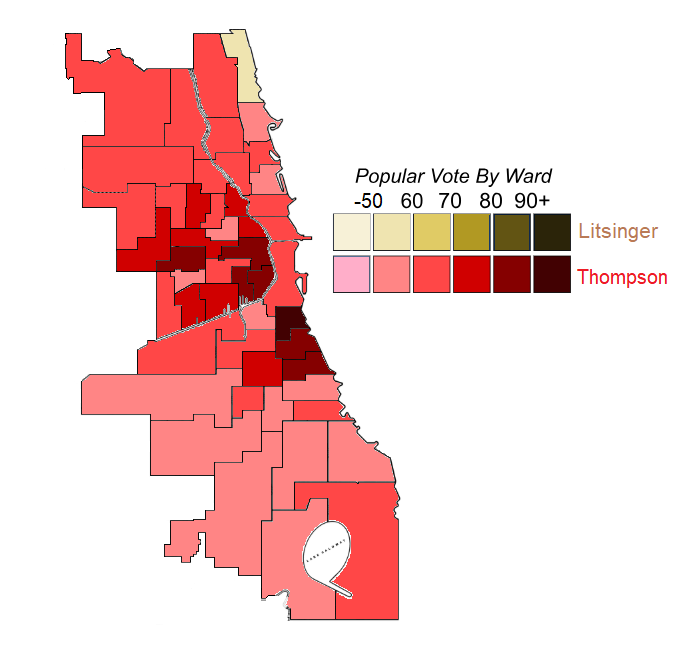
Results of the Republican primary by ward

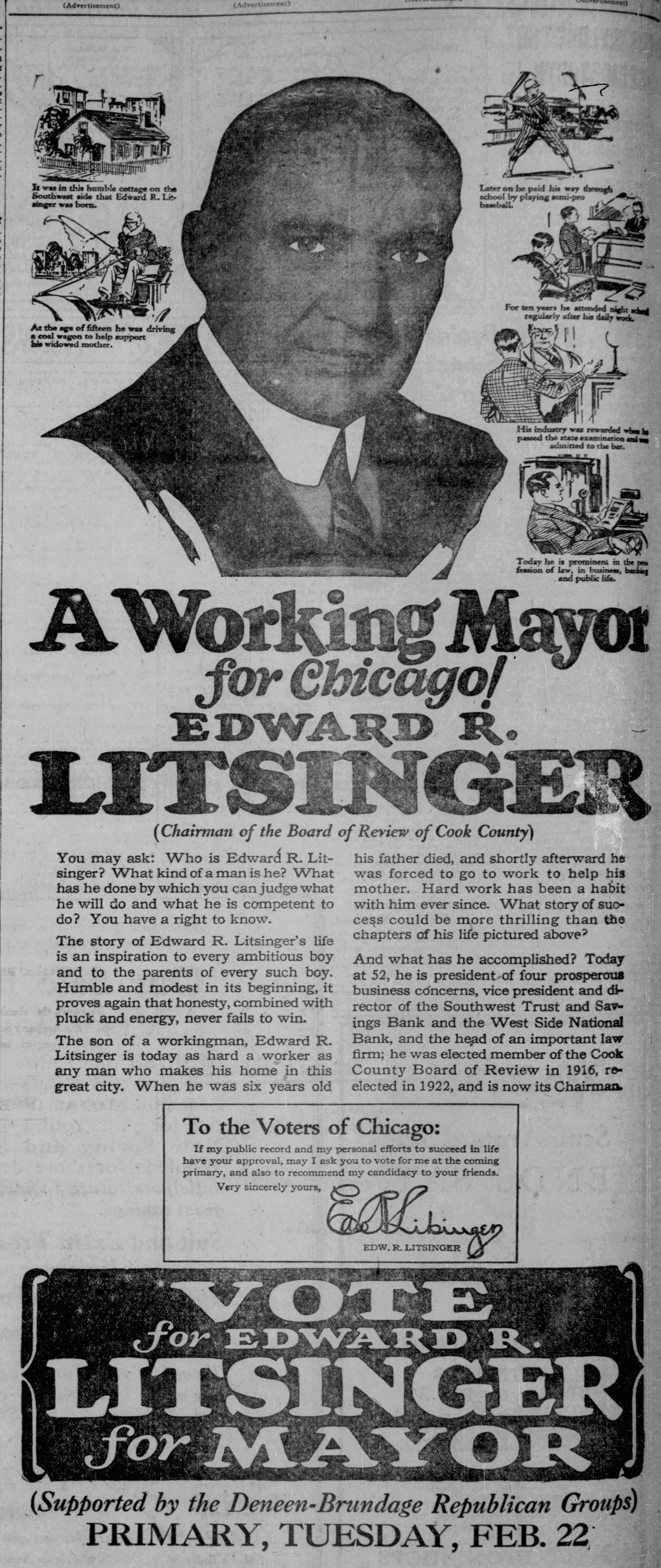
Newspaper advertisement in support of Edward R. Litsinger's campaign, advertising Litsinger's pledge to be a "working mayor for Chicago"

Edward R. Litsinger, who was chairman of the Cook County Board of Review and backed by reform-minded U.S. Senator Charles S. Deneen and Edward J. Brundage, (the latter of whom had split from his political ally Robert E. Crowe by supporting Litsinger), announced his platform on January 9. He promised to compel the City Council to adopt an ordinance that would end the Chicago Traction Wars and consolidate all transportation lines under public ownership, (Note: At the time, Chicago's streetcar lines were managed by Chicago Surface Lines while the "L" was under the control of the Chicago Rapid Transit Company and the buses were operated by the Chicago Motor Coach Company, all private corporations. Public control would come with the formation of the Chicago Transit Authority (CTA) to control the "L" and streetcars in 1947, and complete consolidation took place when the CTA acquired the Chicago Motor Coach Company in 1952.) to construct subways, to form a police investigation into the rampant crime, to look at causes of recent tax increases and investigate potential ways to reverse them, and to clean up streets and alleys. He criticized Thompson as having been corrupt during his previous tenure as mayor. In his campaign, Litsinger pledged "to be a working mayor for all Chicago." Litsinger placed the blame for the city's crime on Robert E. Crowe, the Thompson-aligned Cook County state's attorney.

Robertson initially planned to run in the primary before dropping out in favor of Litsinger per his agreement with Lundin, mounting an independent bid upon Litsinger's primary loss. Former policeman Eugene McCaffrey filed for candidacy on February 2 and attracted suspicion as many of the names on his petition sheets appeared to have been written in the same handwriting. He was allowed on the ballot and received more than 1,500 votes.

The Republican primary was marked by intense vitriol between the candidates. Thompson accused Robertson of messy eating, stating that "[With] eggs in his whiskers, soup on his vest, you'd think the doc got his education driving a garbage wagon." Robertson retaliated, accusing Thompson of corruption. Litsinger reiterated such accusations against Thompson and further accused Thompson of conspiring to get 50,000 Democratic votes. Both candidates asserted that they were guaranteed victory and accused the other of conspiring to steal the primary.

In an open letter, Thompson charged that Edward Brundage and Fred Lundin were suburbanites and were guilty of betraying their city roots. He also alleged that Litsinger, who had come from Back of the Yards, had abandoned his roots, writing "You moved to the Gold Coast. Are you thinking of joining the high brows of Lake Forest and becoming a resident of Lake County too?"

Thompson won by a surprisingly large margin; to many, his victory itself was a surprise. He carried 49 of the city's 50 wards. After Thompson's victory, both partisans of Robertson and Democratic leaders claimed that Democratic voters for Thompson had propelled him to the Republican nomination, with the Democrats claiming that they did so in order to give Dever a weaker opponent in the general election. Additionally, The New York Times reported that thousands of Republicans had refused to cast a vote for either candidate in the primary.

Litsinger delivered a concession speech at his campaign headquarters in the Morrison Hotel, saying,

I will concede that Thompson received more votes than I. I will not concede that he is the better man nor the better candidate. I still believe that the corporation of Chicago needs a businessman at the head of its government. We appealed to the voters of Chicago on the issue of political decency and were rejected. It is unfortunate for Chicago that its citizens rejected political decency. With this experience of defeat still fresh, I say that [if I could do it all] over again...I would [run] again, and make the same sort of campaign...win or lose, I would have no regrets. I have none.

With Thompson's primary victory Robertson launched his independent campaign, having filed a petition the day of the primary with 43,724 signatures to get his People's Ownership Smash Crime Rings party on the ballot.

Mayor of Chicago 1927 (Republican Primary) (Note: Data missing for McCaffrey from the 5th ward)
Party	Candidate	Votes	%
Republican	William Hale Thompson	342,279	67.62
Republican	Edward R. Litsinger	162,240	32.05
Republican	Eugene McCaffrey	1,633	0.32
Total votes		506,152	100.00

=== Independent Republican primary ===
The "Independent Republican" ticket held a primary. The mayoral slot had no candidates, but write-in votes were cast. Thompson won this primary, but chose not to accept their nomination.

Mayor of Chicago 1927 (Independent Republican Primary)
Party	Candidate	Votes	%
Write-in	William Hale Thompson	173	43.58
Write-in	John Dill Robertson	115	28.97
Write-in	Edward R. Litsinger	77	19.40
Write-in	William Emmett Dever (incumbent)	31	7.81
Write-in	Oscar Wolff	1	0.25
Total votes		397	100.00

== General election ==
The general election was held on April 5, along with general elections for City Clerk and City Treasurer and aldermanic runoffs.

=== Campaign ===
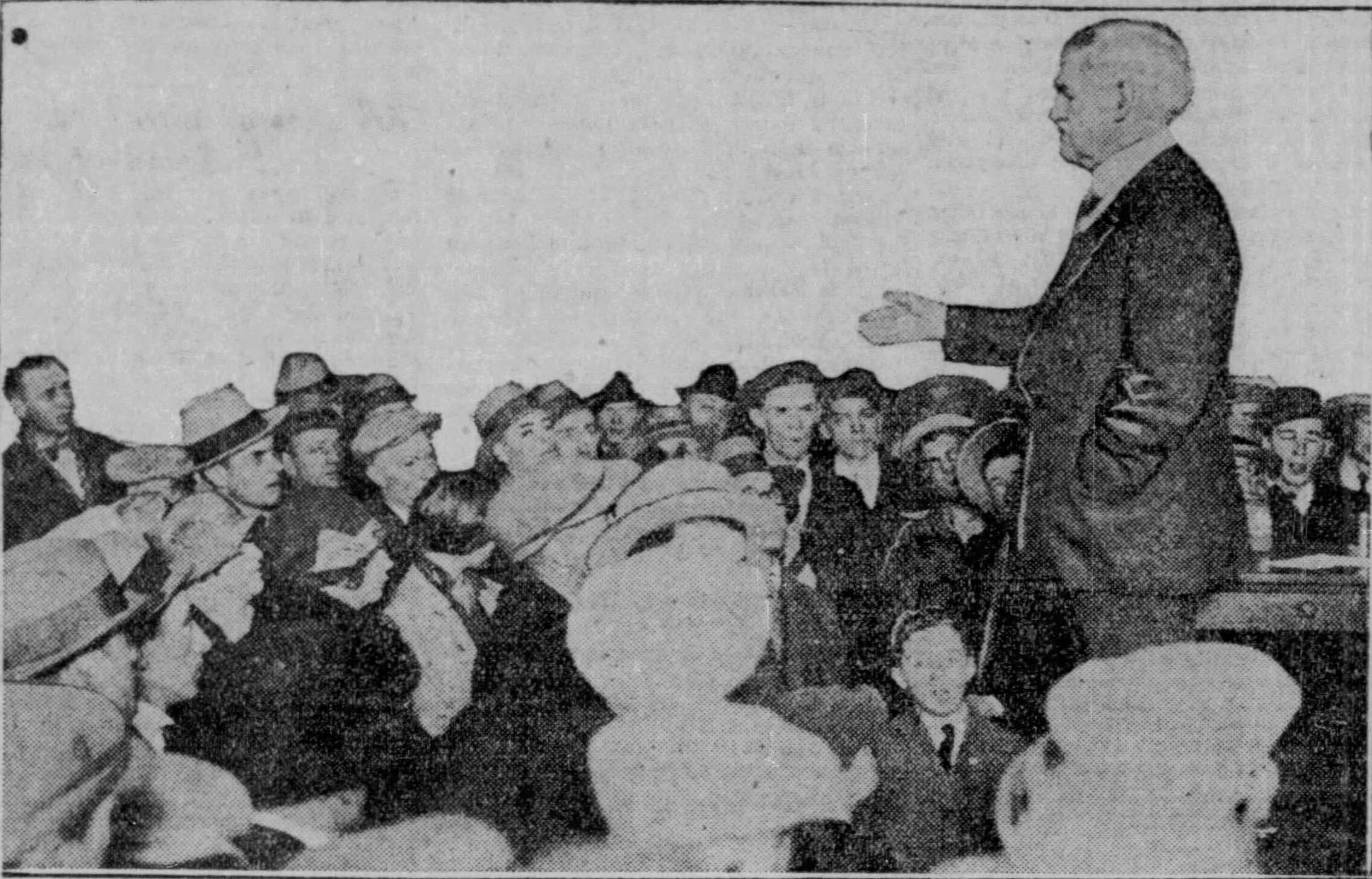
Dever campaigning before stockyard workers in the Exchange Building of the Union Stock Yards

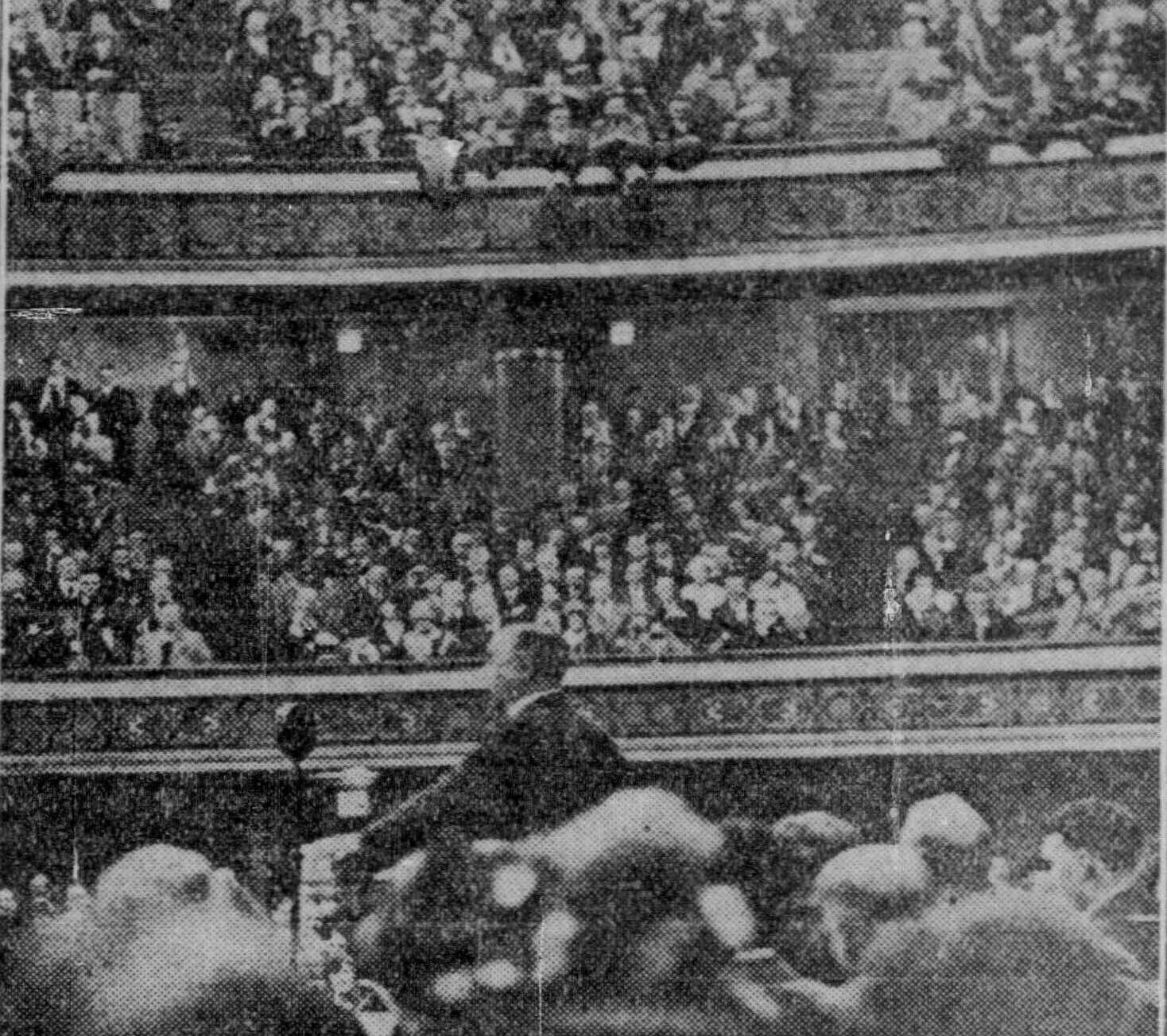
Thompson speaks at a mass meeting at the Medinah Temple

Campaign events held by Dever and Thompson, both on April 2, 1927

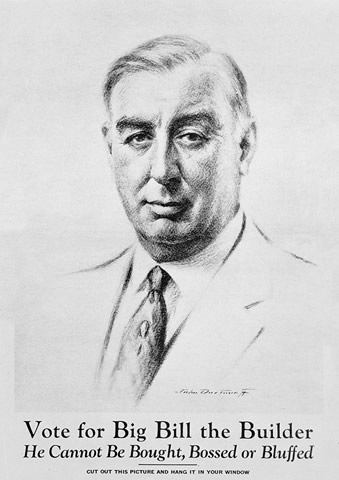
Thompson campaign poster, touting him as "Big Bill the Builder" who "cannot be bought, bossed, or bluffed"

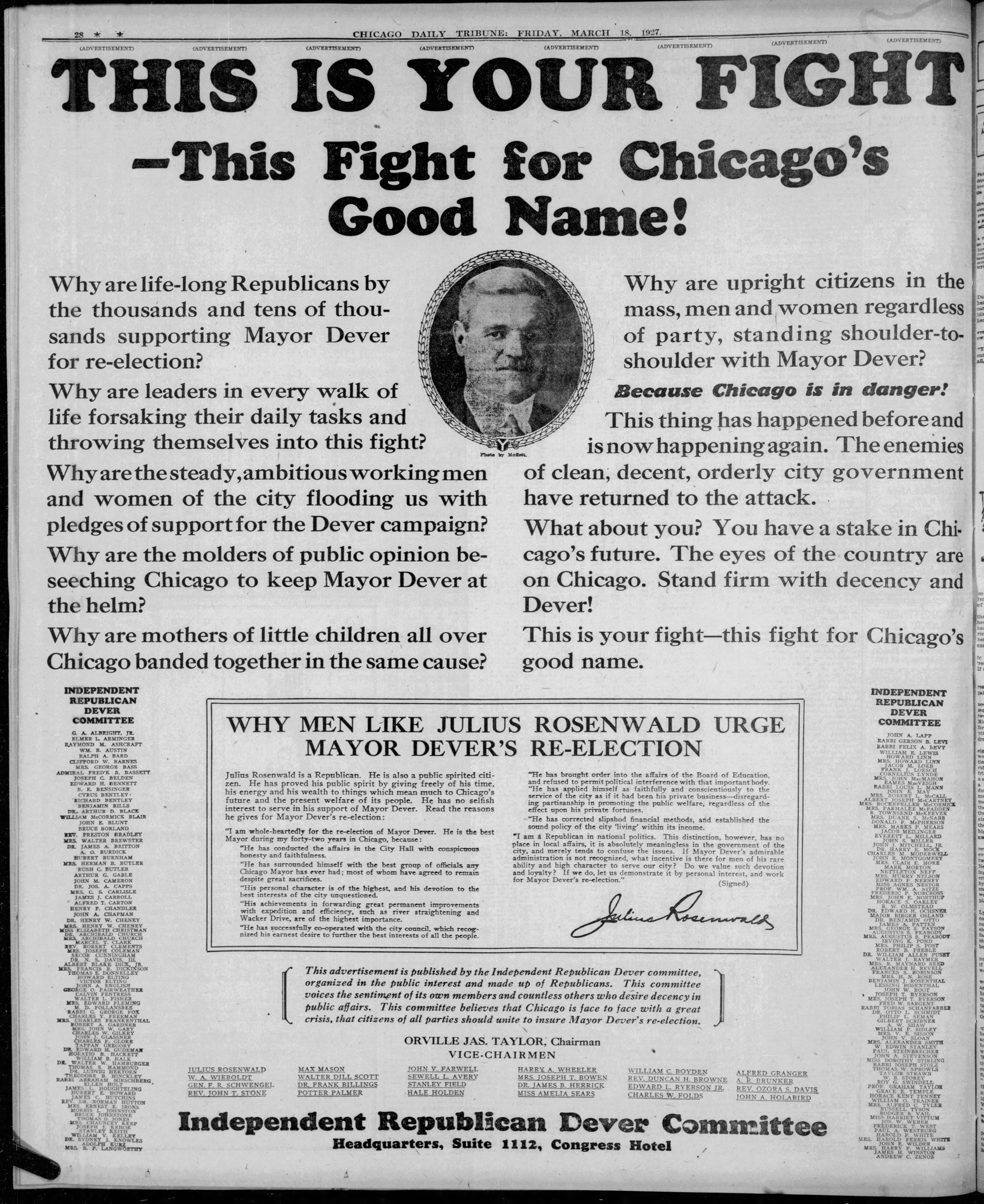
Advertisement in support of Dever's campaign, characterizing the election as a fight to preserve the reputation of the city

Thompson accused Dever of treason. Using the slogan "America First", he alleged that the school superintendent, William McAndrew, was a British agent sent by King George as part of a grand conspiracy to manipulate the minds of American children and set the groundwork for the United Kingdom to repossess the United States; he accused the "left-handed Irishman" Dever of being part of the plot. Thompson based these claims on McAndrew being critical of such artworks as Archibald Willard's The Spirit of '76 and allowing the use in schools of textbooks which Thompson believed were unpatriotic. Thompson declared that his America First slate would elect so many of its candidates that "the king of England will find out for the first time he is damned unpopular", and implied that he might have Dever sent to jail. He described Dever as "very weak, no courage, no manhood, doesn't know how to fight". He promised to reform the police department by ending enforcement of prohibition. He also criticized the League of Nations and the World Court. Thompson also supported ending the metering of municipal water.

Democratic chief Brennan said that "All the hoodlums are for Thompson", which Thompson used to convince his supporters that the Democrats were elitist and looked down upon them. Campaigning for German votes, Thompson stated:

They called me pro-German during the war because I kept my oath to protect the people. If you make a mistake and vote for some one who doesn't care for you or his oath to God, you'll have to pay the penalty. If I'm elected mayor, I'll build the largest town hall in the world where your German choruses of 25,000 voices can sing as they never have before.

Dever largely refused to engage in Thompson's style of rhetoric. He instead promised to engage in a debate of substantive issues, partaking only in a "decent, friendly discussion without malice or sensationalism". This was not without exception, as Dever did once comment in an interview with the Chicago Daily News that, "Thompson's trouble is mental". Largely, however, Dever responded to Thompson's accusations by declaring them "blarney" which he had no intention of dignifying, and noting that Thompson's comments on international affairs were irrelevant to the duties and powers of the mayoralty. He ran on the slogans "Dever for Decency" and "The best mayor Chicago ever had", the former also used by The Independent Republicans for Dever Committee. He attempted, particularly early in the race, to tout parts of his record such as his construction of Wacker Drive and 51 new schools, as well as a pure milk ordinance he had helped pass. He promised to continue his construction program, including building a long-anticipated State Street subway and widening LaSalle Street. (Note: The State Street Subway would open in 1943.) He demurred that "no superman can be found to eliminate crime". Dever's campaign characterized Thompson as, "a political pyromaniac".

Dever allies accused Thompson of receiving $100,000 in campaign contributions from transit and public utilities mogul Samuel Insull during his 1915 mayoral campaign, and insinuated that he was again receiving significant financial support from Insull.

Supporters of both Thompson and Dever resorted to bigotry. Some Republicans used anti-Catholic rhetoric against Dever. Despite Dever also having had a positive relation with black residents of the city, some Democrats attempted to take advantage of Thompson's particularly positive relation with the city's African-American community in order to divide voters racially, claiming that Thompson's election would lead to "Negro supremacy". Palm cards were circulated with an image of Thompson kissing a black boy and with the reverse side reading "Thompson—Me Africa First". Some Democrats hired black people to canvass white neighborhoods for Thompson in an effort to scare white voters. They also attempted to lure black Thompson voters downtown, where they did not often go, with a fake rally outside of Thompson's campaign headquarters. Additionally, the song "Bye Bye Blackbird" was sung at some Dever rallies. Dever supporters also mocked Thompson and his supporters by having a Black man dress up as Paul Revere ride on horseback through the Chicago Loop shouting "The British are coming." Supporters of each candidate accused the other's supporters of plotting to use underhanded tactics to steal the election. In the closing day of the campaign, Dever and Thompson accused each other of attempting to incite a race riot among the city's Black populace.

Robertson continued his platform of quashing crime, promising to "find another Theodore Roosevelt" as police chief and smash organized crime within thirty days. At a rally on March 28, 1927, Robertson announced that, if elected, he would appoint former United States attorney Edwin A. Olson as police chief.

In the closing days of the campaign, analysts perceived Dever to be gaining new momentum.

Example campaign advertisements

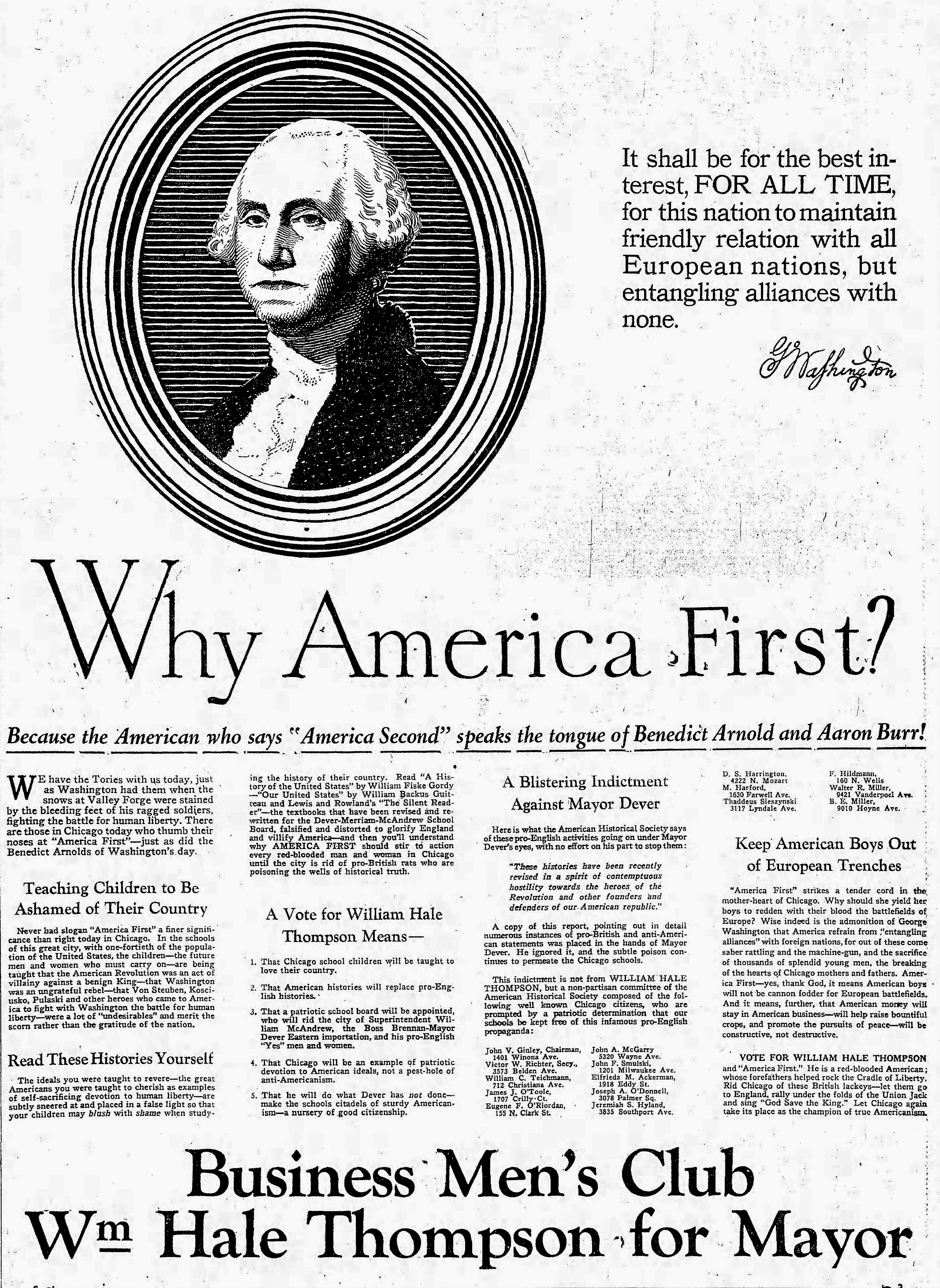
A campaign ad in support of Thompson baring the slogan "America First". This full-page ad was run March 30, 1927

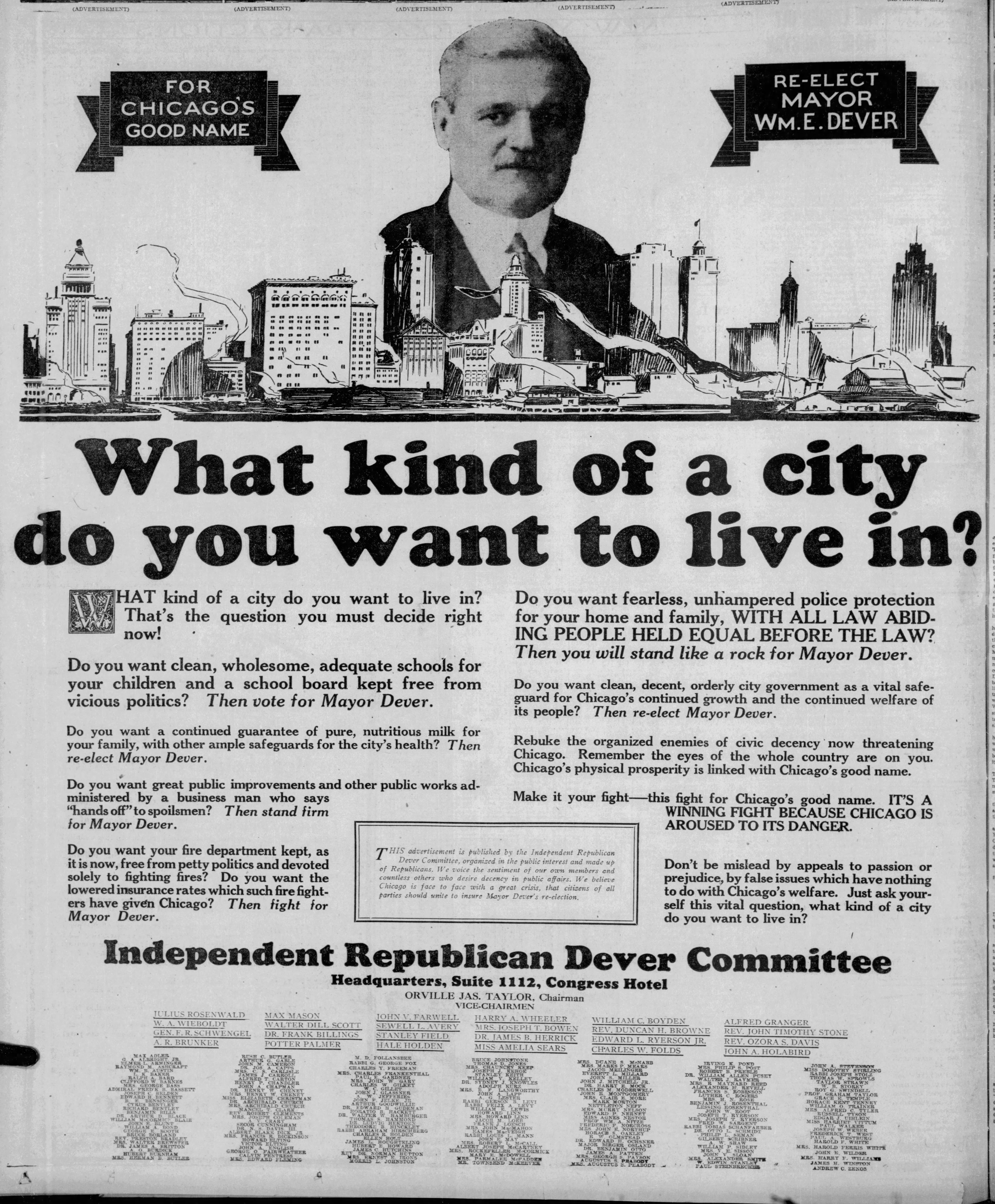
Ad run by the "Independent Republican Dever Committee" in the Chicago Tribune urging voters to reelect Dever "for Chicago's good name" and asking voters to consider "what kind of a city" they want to live in

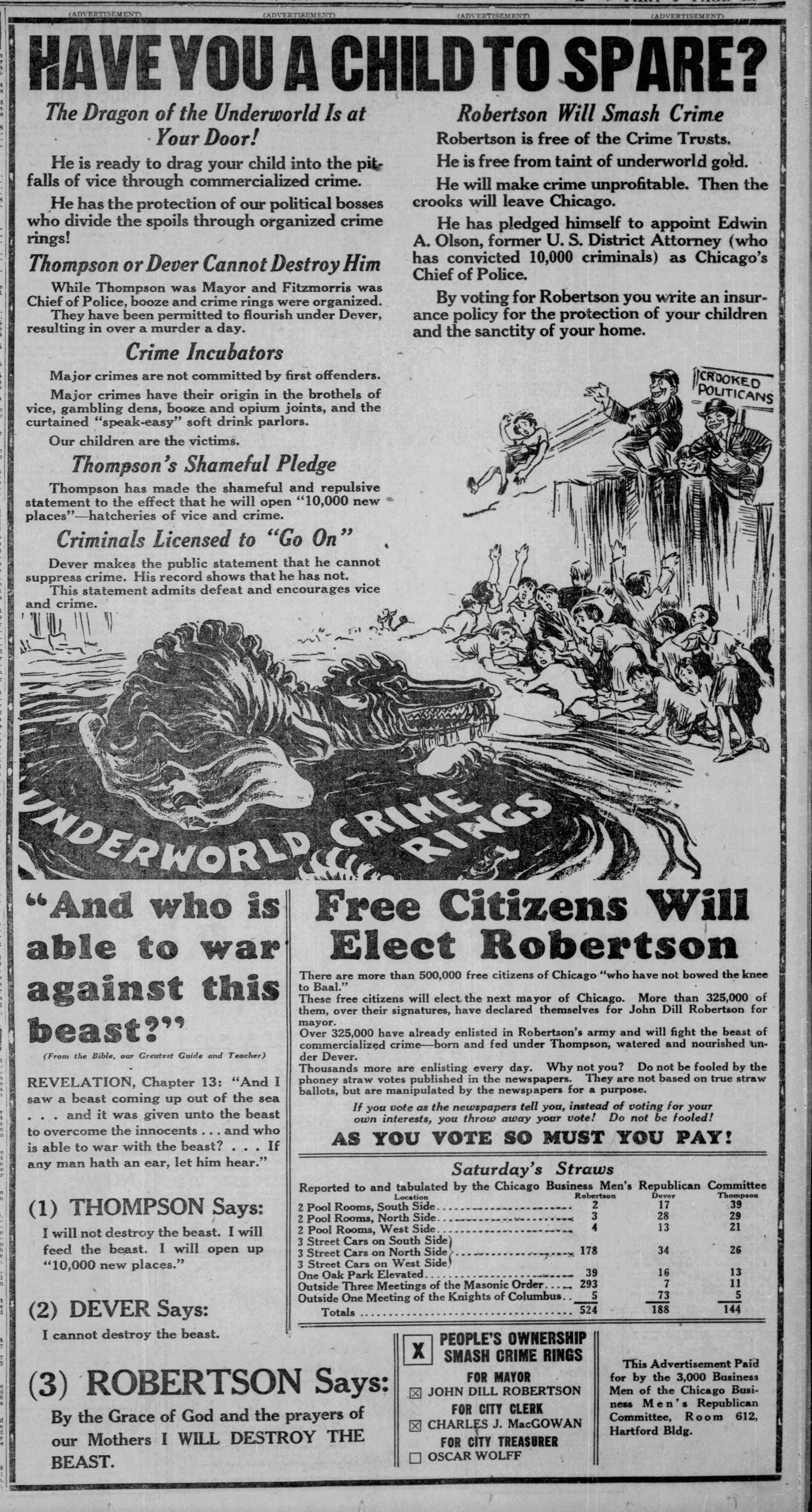
Newspaper advertisement run in support of John Dill Robertson's candidacy by the Chicago Business Men's Republican Committee. The ad touts Robertson as the candidate who could quash the "beast" of crime.

=== Endorsements ===
Thompson was backed by two Hearst-owned newspapers, as well as the African-American Daily Defender and L'Italia, the city's second-best selling Italian newspaper. Four of the city's daily newspapers backed Dever, as did the city's largest Polish, Jewish, and Italian newspapers.

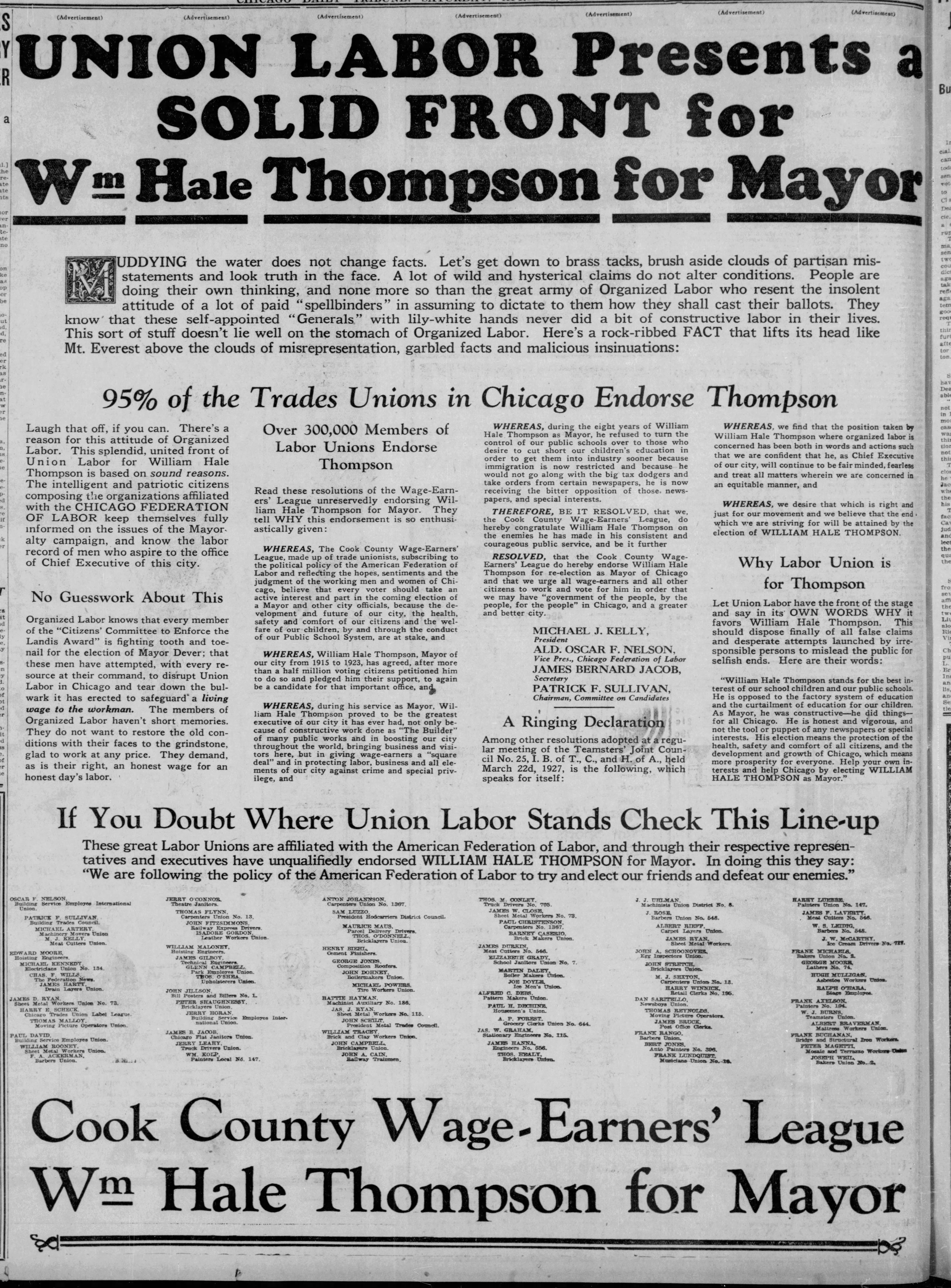
Cook County Wage-Earner's League newspaper advertisement claiming that "95% of the Trades Unions in Chicago Endorse Thompson"

The Chicago Federation of Labor endorsed Thompson. Margaret Haley, president of the Chicago Federation of Teachers, personally endorsed him as well. The Cook County Wage-Earners' League ran an advertisement for Thompson in the Chicago Tribune, in which it claimed that 95 percent of the trade unions in Chicago endorsed him. However, in actuality, labor support was divided between the two major party candidates. While the Cook County Wage Earners, headed by Chicago Federation of Labor vice-president Oscar F. Nelson, backed Thompson, a notable group of labor officials also backed Dever. Among those backing Dever were Chicago Federation of Labor president John Fitzpatrick and Illinois State Federation of Labor secretary Victory A. Olander. Dever also received the endorsement of the union representing the city's transit employees (workers on its streetcar and elevated lines).

After Thompson beat Deneen's favored candidate in the primary Deneen backed Thompson in the general election. Martin Walsh, who had run against Dever in the Democratic primary, served as a stump speaker for Thompson. Thompson was also endorsed by Illinois Attorney General Oscar E. Carlstrom, Illinois Secretary of State Louis Lincoln Emmerson, Illinois Lieutenant Governor Fred E. Sterling, Cook County Sheriff Charles E. Graydon, Cook County Coroner Oscar Wolff and Chicago Postmaster (and 1923 Republican mayoral nominee) Arthur C. Lueder. Thompson also received a last-minute endorsement from Illinois Governor Len Small.

Thompson received the endorsement of Al Capone after promising lax enforcement of Prohibition. It was public knowledge that Capone was supporting Thompson's campaign effort, collecting campaign contributions from those who sold his beer. Capone donated between $100,000 (Note: $1.4 million in 2018) and $500,000 (Note: $7.2 million in 2018) to Thompson's campaign. Other crime figures backing Thompson included Jack Zuta, who gave $50,000 (Note: $720,000 in 2018) to his campaign, Timothy D. Murphy, and Vincent Drucci.

Dever was endorsed by prominent reformers campaigning for "Dever and Decency" on his behalf, including Charles Edward Merriam, Harriet Vittum, Harold L. Ickes, and Jane Addams. The Ministerial Association of Chicago also endorsed Dever, calling him "the best mayor Chicago ever had ... [and] as loyal as a Catholic as he is [a] citizen". He was backed by businessmen Sewell Avery, Julius Rosenwald, and W. A. Wieboldt, as well as university presidents Max Mason and Walter Dill Scott and attorney Orville James Taylor. He was also backed by socialites Louise deKoven Bowen and Edward Ryerson Jr, as well as builder Potter Palmer and Donald Richberg. Congressman Adolph J. Sabath was a strong backer of Dever's campaign. School superintendent William McAndrew distributed a letter to school principals urging for people to vote Dever.

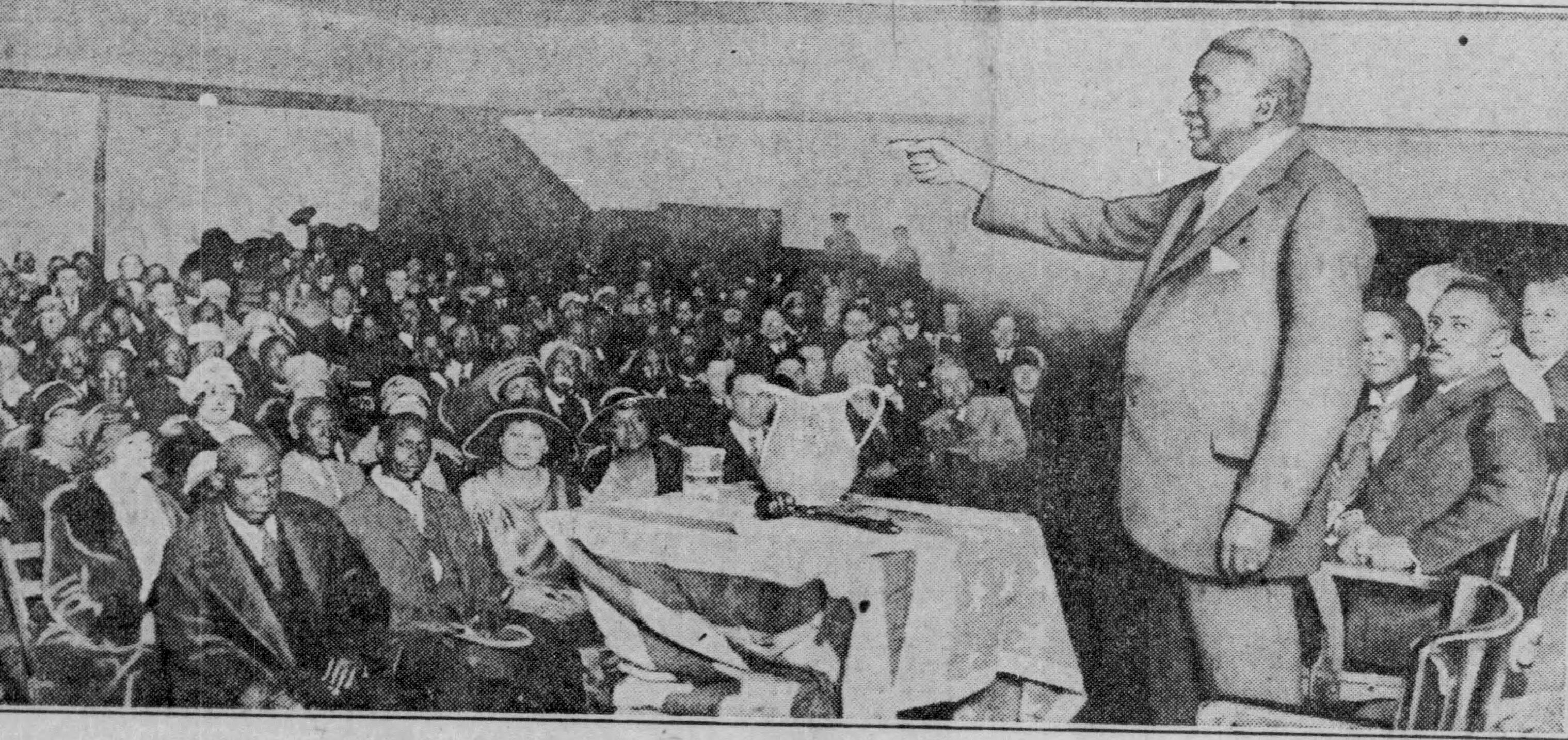
Edward Herbert Wright campaigns for John Dill Robertson

In addition to Lundin, Robertson was supported by the incumbent (Note: Albert had been defeated by Haffa in the first-round aldermanic election. However, he filed an appeal to have the result struck, and at the time of the endorsement had gained a new race in the runoff, which he would win. Ultimately, however, the council would vote to unseat him in favor of Haffa on October 31, claiming that the judge in the case had erred in counting spoiled ballots to determine the majority needed to avoid a runoff and thereby granting Albert a new race.) 43rd ward alderman Arthur F. Albert, whose opponent Titus Haffa endorsed Thompson. Henry F. Batterman, Lundin's 41st ward committeeman, supported Robertson before crossing over to Thompson. Despite Thompson's popularity with African American voters, there were Edward Herbert Wright-aligned Black Republicans who publicly backed Robertson.

=== Polling ===
==== Chicago Tribune straw polls ====
The Chicago Tribune conducted straw polls during a portion of the campaign. The first of these polls was published on March 20, 1927. These were not modern scientific polls, and many focused on specific sub-portions of the city's populace, rather than true representative samples.

The Chicago Tribune straw polls indicated that Thompson had very strong support among African Americans. The cummulative result of all 132,107 straw votes cast over the polls published between March 20 and April 4, 1927, was 51.20 percent for Thompson, 44.22 percent for Dever, and 4.56 percent for Robertson. Despite Thompson regularly leading these polls, on April 4, 1927, the Chicago Tribune wrote that a "Dever plurality" was indicated by an increasing trend towards the mayor in the later days of straw polling.

View source data.

Chicago Tribune straw polls
Date published	Sample size	William Emmett Dever (Democrat)	John Dill Robertson (Independent)	William Hale Thompson (Republican)	Lead
April 4, 1927	11,716 (Note: This straw poll was conducted in all three sides of the city. Locations were South Side street corners, South Side theaters, various West Side locations (including Chicago "L" stations), West Side theaters, and North Side Chicago "L" stations.)	46.36%	5.56%	48.09%	+1.73
April 3, 1927	13,789 (Note: This straw poll was conducted in all three sides of the city. "Collected from north side theaters and north side stations of the elevated, from south side street corners, and then two canvasses of the west side, one of street corners alone, and another of street intersections and elevated stations. Mayor Dever took the lead in the north side "L" stations and in one of the polls of the west side, and the race was reasonably close on the south side".)	46.77%	3.50%	49.72%	+2.95
April 2, 1927	6,198 (Note: Straw poll of street intersections on the South Side)	44.34%	5.25%	50.41%	+6.07
April 1, 1927	8,943 (Note: Straw poll conducted March 30, taken at "west side street intersection and loop theaters". It was noted that, "women predominated heavily at the movies, and at those places Mayor Dever took the lead; while at the west side street intersections Thompson had a substantial margin".)	44.70%	4.90%	50.38%	+5.68
March 30, 1927	10,473 (Note: Straw poll an amalgamation of, "the opinions of 10,473 persons found at west side theaters and street corners, at one or more street intersections in each ward of south side, and three separate polls, exclusively of women, in outlying districts")	44.82%	4.16%	50.01%	+5.19
March 29, 1927	8,283 (Note: Straw poll an amalgamation of, "six different polls. One was of south side movie theaters, another was of Jewish, another of German, another of Swedish, another was of Swedish, and still another of Norwegian residents. With one exception, the poll by races was obtained Sunday at the door of churches attended principally by each nationality. Some of them were too late for adequate check and corrolation yesterday morning." Saturday, in this instance, would have meant March 26, 1927.)	53.89%	3.03%	43.07%	+10.82
March 28, 1927	4,741 (Note: Straw poll an amalgamation of polls of select churches, and polls of North Side theater-goers.)	56.85%	4.26%	38.89%	+17.96
March 27, 1927	5,956 (Note: Straw poll taken at, "west side movie theaters and certain street intersection in the heart of the south side colored area")	31.20%	3.54%	65.16%	+33.96
March 26, 1927	12,916 (Note: Straw poll an amalgamation of, "120 different polls" of factory workers and clerical help)	43.31%	4.76%	52.91%	+9.60
March 25, 1927	5,664 (Note: Straw poll partially among, "employees of factories, mills, and plants which have not heretofore been polled by The Tribune." The poll showed, "Mayor Dever made an unexpected showing in view of previous straws collected, and ran ahead among office employees of factories". Additionally, "sundry street intersection and three loop office buildings were polled." Additionally, "a poll was taken of the street car men at the North avenue barn. They lined up stronger for Dever than had been anticipated. More than three-fourths of them cast Dever ballots".)	46.58%	6.48%	48.00%	+1.42
March 24, 1927	6,946	36.19%	4.35%	59.46%	+23.27
March 23, 1927	8,029 (Note: Straw poll, "from 21 south side movie theaters, four street intersections in white neighborhoods, five street corners in colored sections, all on the city's south side; and several miscellaneous locations. The total votes collected are 8,929, of which more than 80 per cent were gathered on the south side" 6,524 votes in the straw poll were collected from the South Side.)	41.64%	3.75%	54.59%	+12.85
March 22, 1927	9,321 (Note: Straw poll conducted at downtown office buildings and South Sude "sundry theaters")	53.68%	4.25%	44.22%	+9.46
March 21, 1927	5,368 (Note: Straw poll of West Side)	35.46%	5.76%	58.77%	+23.31
March 20, 1927	5,882 (Note: Straw poll of patrons of prominent movie theaters, with 20 theaters canvassed (14 on the North Side, and six on the South Side).)	44.08%	4.25%	51.66%	+7.58

==== Chicago Business Men's Republican Committee straw polls ====
Newspaper advertisements for Robertson's campaign run by the Chicago Business Men's Republican Committee included straw polls which each surveyed several locations in the city. The committee, which actively supported Robertson's candidacy, had tabulated the straw polls itself.

Chicago Business Men's Republican Committee straw polls
Date published	Sample size	William Emmett Dever (Democrat)	John Dill Robertson (Independent)	William Hale Thompson (Republican)
April 4, 1927	1,361 (Note: Straw poll conducted outside a Protestant church on North Side, outside a Catholic church on the North Side, outside a Protestant church on South Side, outside a Catholic church on the South Side, outside a Protestant church on West Side, outside a Catholic church on the West Side, at a pool room on the North Side, at a pool room on the South Side, at a pool room on the West Side, at a soft drink parlor on the North Side, a soft drink parlor on the South Side, a soft drink parlor on the West Side, a movie theater on the North Side, a movie theater on the South Side, a movie theater on the West Side, in front of the First United Methodist Church of Chicago)	40.12%	40.34%	19.54%
April 3, 1927	856 (Note: Straw poll conducted on April 3 of 2 poll rooms on the North Side, 2 pool rooms on the South Side, 2 pool rooms on the West Side, 3 streetcars on the North Side, 3 streetcars on the South Side, 3 streetcars on the West Side, one station of the Oak Park Elevated, outside three Masonic Order meetings, and outside one Knights of Columbus meeting)	21.96%	61.21%	16.82%
April 1, 1927	1,660 (Note: Straw poll conducted of Motor Row District, State and Madison and 12:00pm, Chicago "L" trains, 12 streetcars originating in The Loop, three pool rooms, and in front of 5 churches from different denominations.)	32.29%	45.72%	21.99%

=== Election day security ===
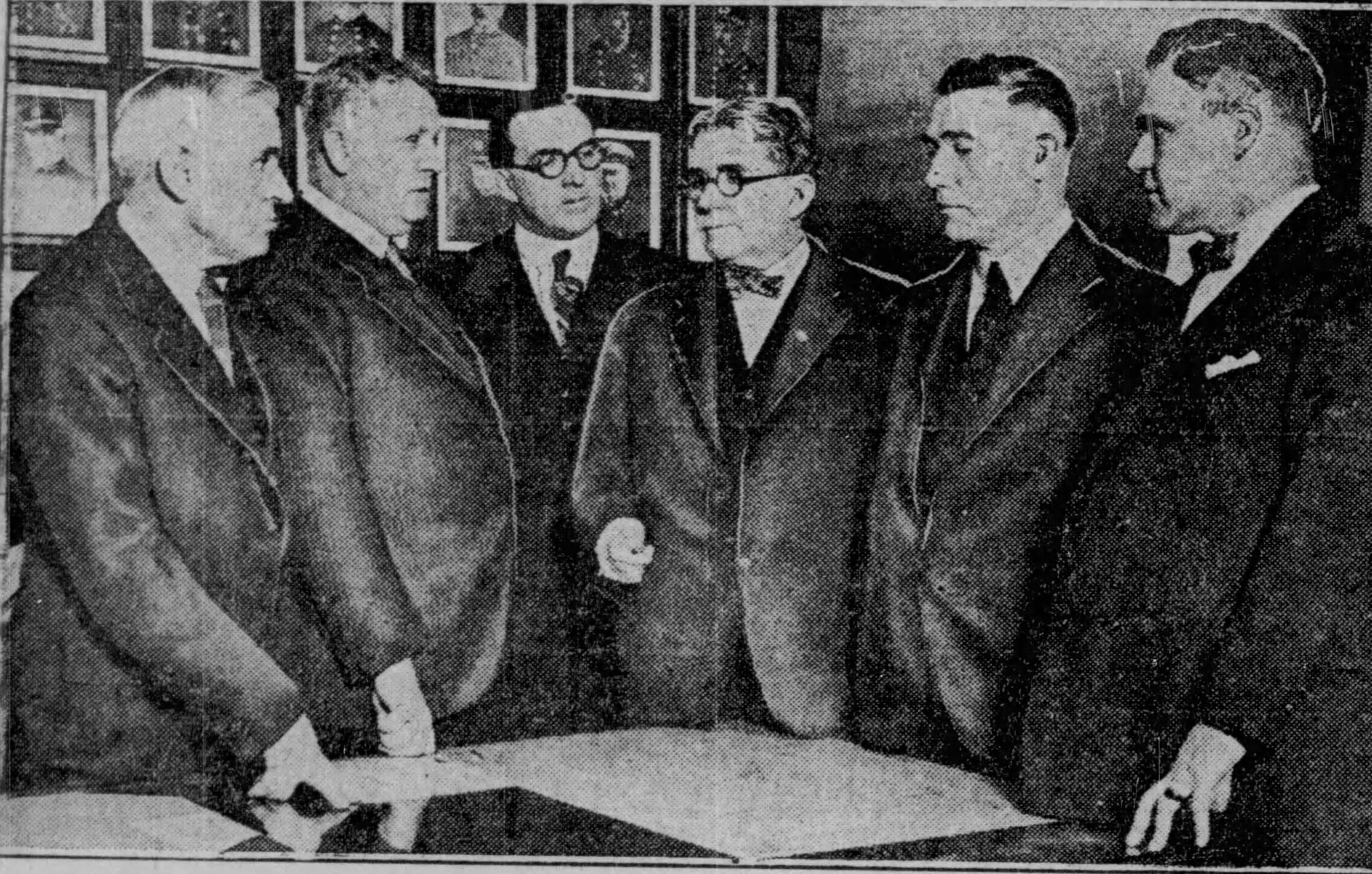
Police Superintendent Morgan A. Collins (fourth from left) and several police captains plan for election day peacekeeping

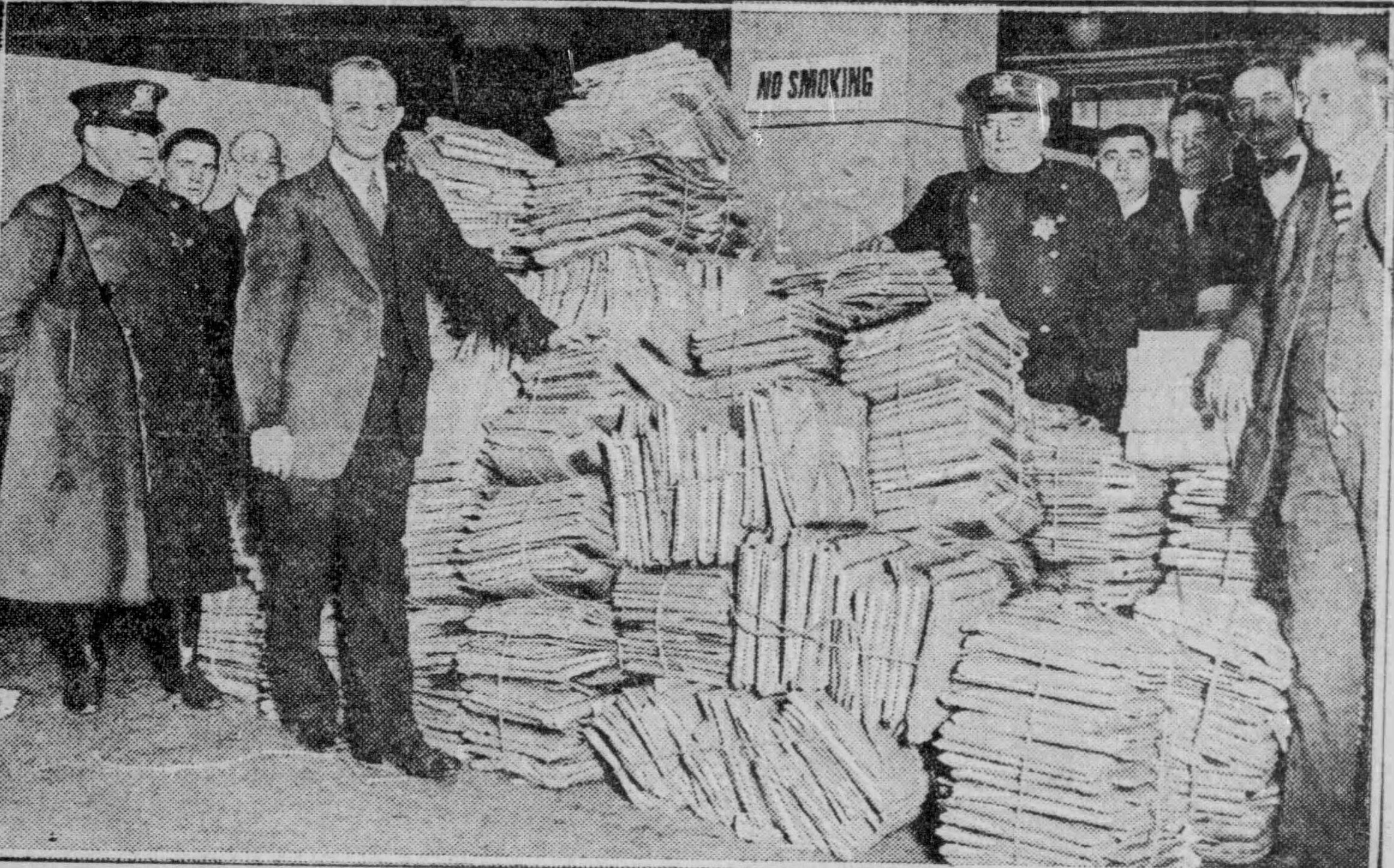
Policemen stand guard of blank ballot papers stored in the office of the Chicago Board of Election Commissioners ahead of the general election

Due to fears of race riots on election day, ahead of the election, there was talk of the military potentially providing security in the city on election day. Ultimately, the Chicago Police Department sent 5,000 men (including standard policemen, plain clothes officers, and special machine gun squads) to guard the polls. Police Superintendent Morgan A. Collins warned the city's criminal elements, "Any gangsters that are out Tuesday had batter wear bullet-proof vests," warning that the police planned to, "shoot first, talk afterward". The Sherman House Hotel, home to both Dever and Thompson's campaign headquarters, was given police security scrutiny on election day. Despite Cook County Sheriff Charles E. Graydon requesting that Illinois National Guardsmen be kept at the ready, they were not called to the city. Instead, Adjutant General of Illinois Carlos E. Black promised that guardsmen would be able to be deployed on a two-hour notice. Thompson himself had urged for the National Guard to be sent to secure the polls in Chicago. In all, more than 5,000 police officers in 100 squads guarded the city during the election.

The city avoided rioting on election day. Universal Service described the election as the city's "quietest election in recent years" in terms of electoral violence. In an incident of election crime, gangsters managed to steal the ballot boxes from the 29th precinct of the 45th ward at gunpoint. Shot fatally during election law enforcement activity was mobster Vincent Drucci.

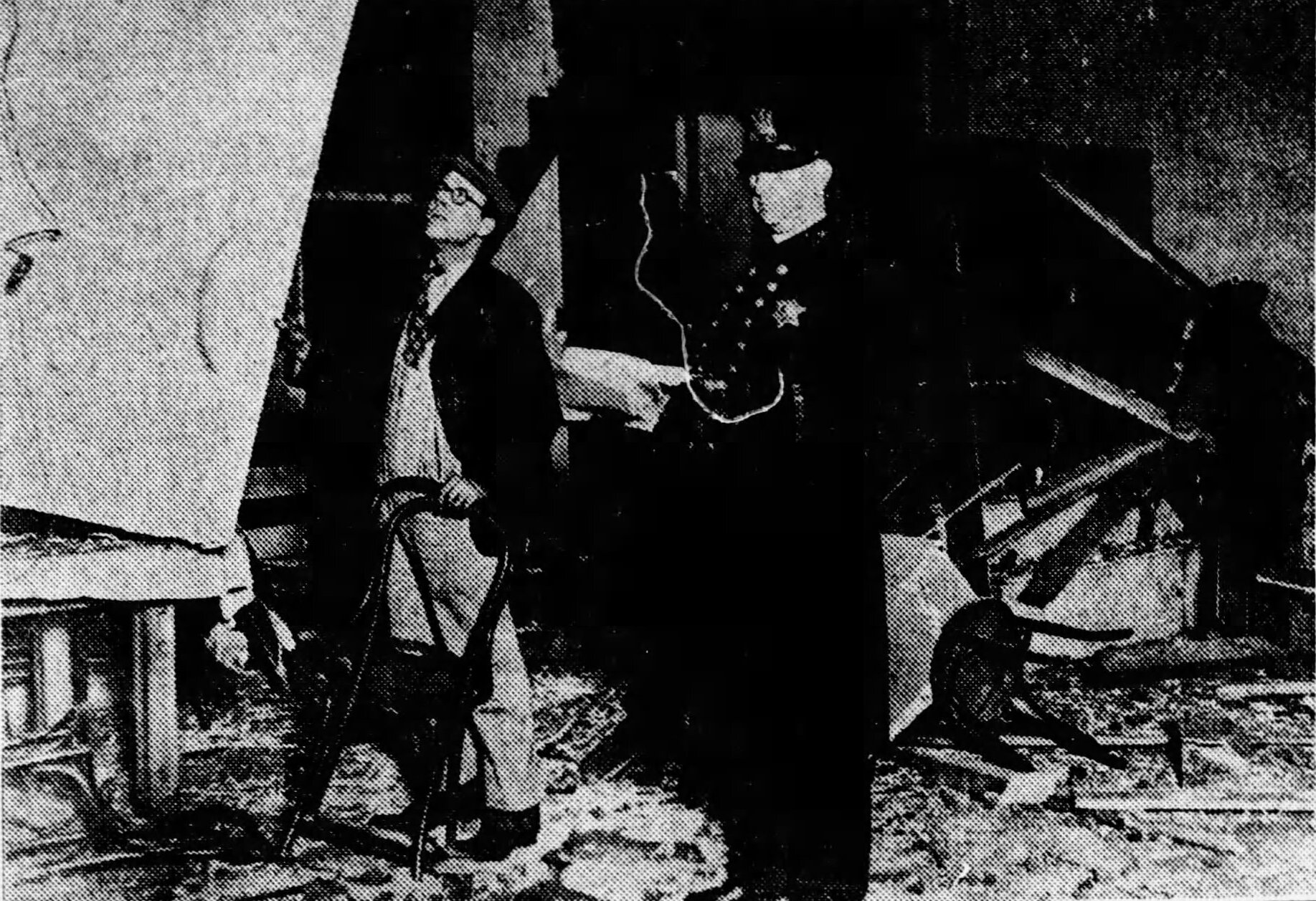
Men inspecting the wreckage of a bombed ward Democratic Party headquarters building, an instance of electoral violence in what was overall considered a relatively low-violence general election (by the standards of its era)

The election was marked by an unusually low level of crime: only one ballot box theft and a negligible amount of violence. Some claimed that this was due to Capone using his men to guard polling stations and ensure votes for Thompson, but contemporary accounts make no mention of gang activity and police were dispatched to guard polling stations, aided by City Hall employees. Police attributed the quiet at least in part to the death of Drucci, who had allegedly raided the downtown offices of the Dever-supporting 42nd Ward alderman Dorsey Crowe the day before the election and was killed by police upon his arrest later that night. Among some of the incidents of crime that were reported was the kidnapping of two election judges. Two buildings were bombed, including a soft drink establishment owned by State Representative Lawrence C. O'Brien and the 42nd ward Democratic Party headquarters.

=== Result ===
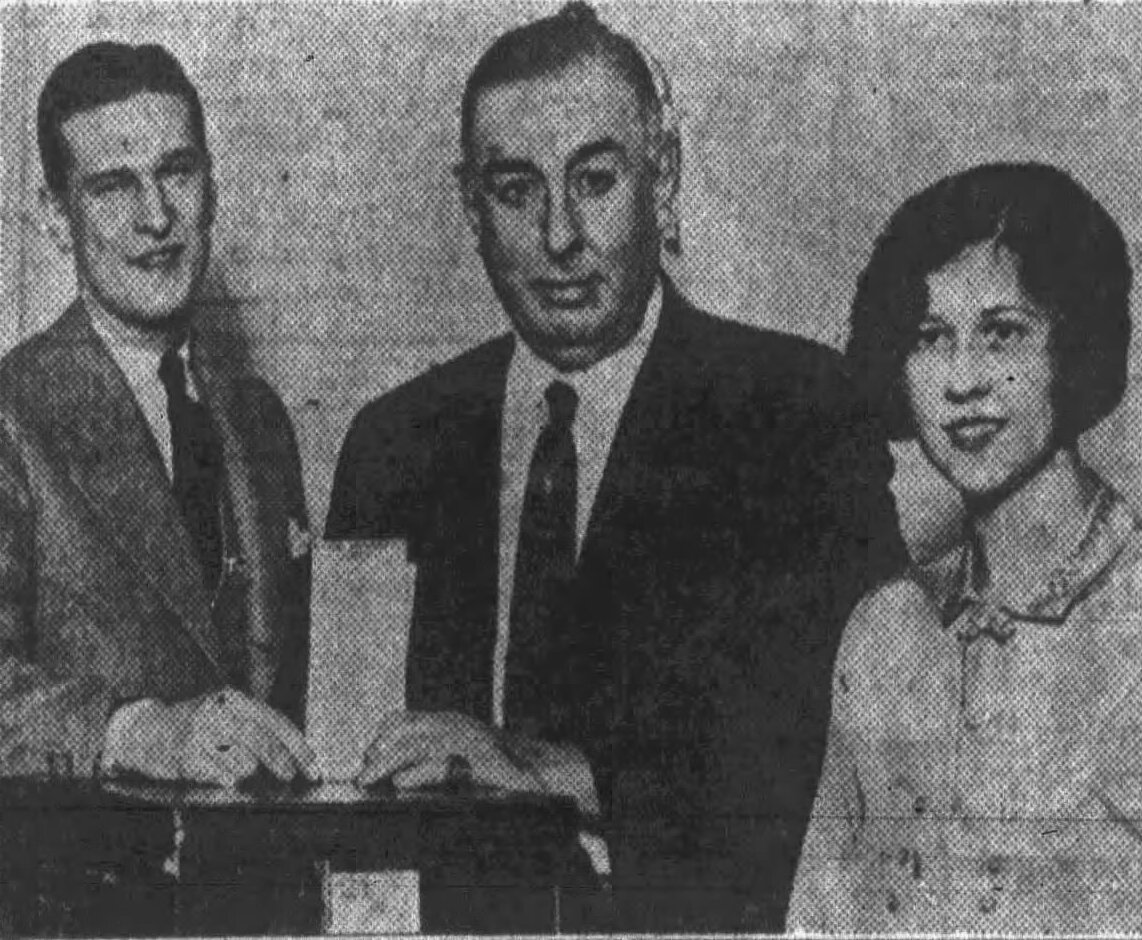
Thompson (center) casts his own ballot

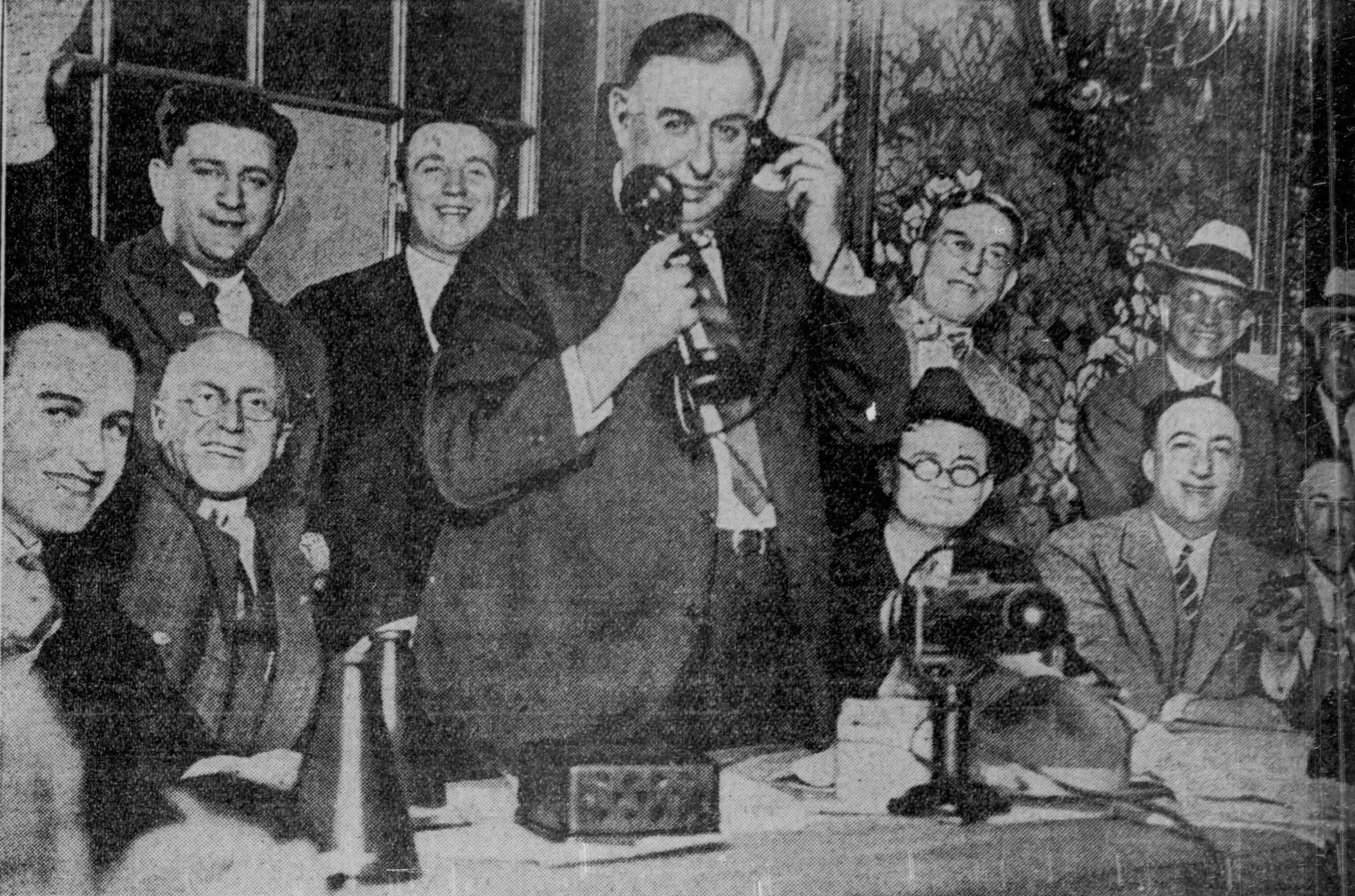
Thompson making a celebratory phone call to his wife after the election returns indicated that he had won the election

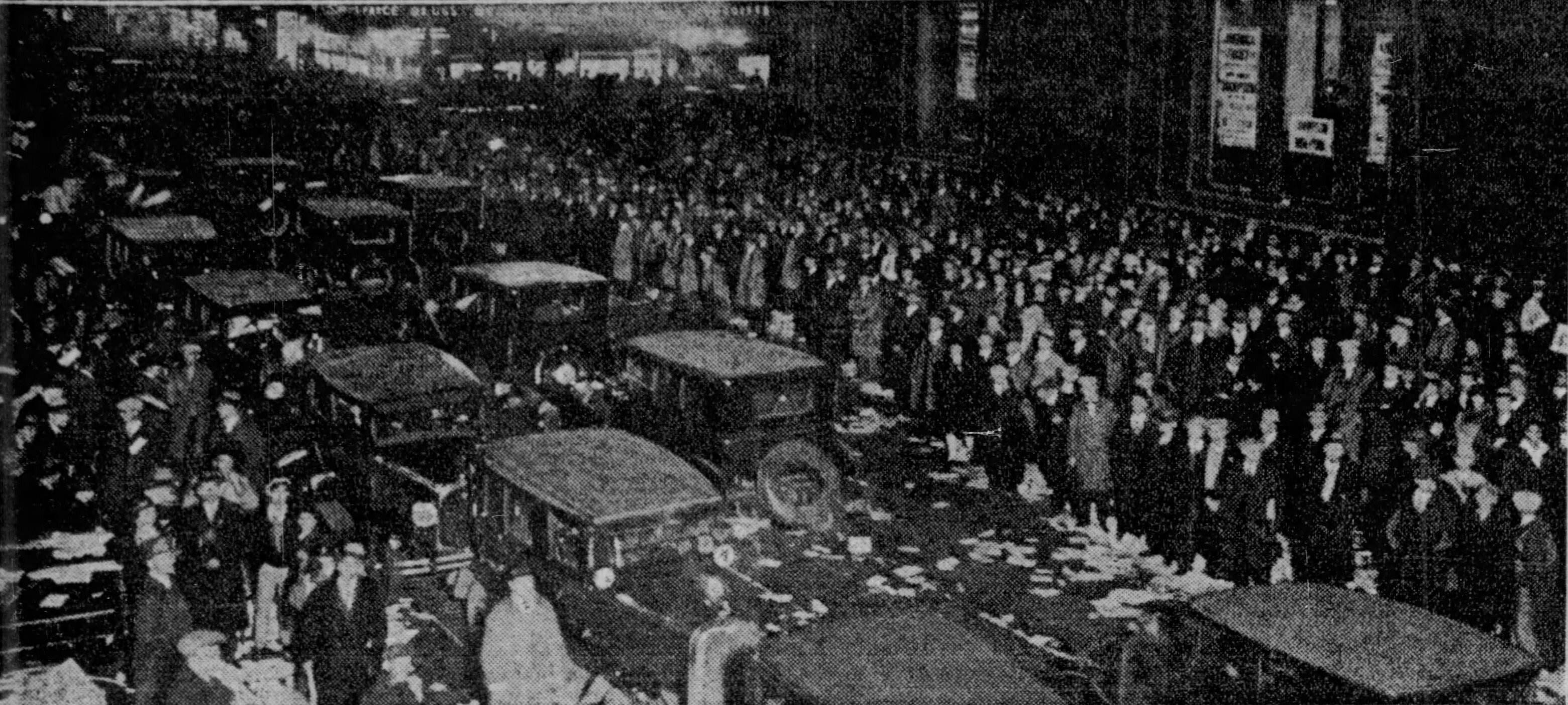
Crowd of Thompson supporters gather in celebration outside of the Sherman House Hotel after Thompson's victory

The election set the then-record for the most votes cast in a Chicago mayoral election, with just under a million votes being cast.

Thompson won the election with more than 51 percent of votes cast, carrying 28 of the city's 50 wards. Dever's campaign ultimately failed to achieve momentum; Thompson had dominated the discourse early on and left Dever's supporters struggling to react to Thompson's campaign and ultimately failing to fully promote Dever's own message.

Dever saw a significant decline in support from the Democratic party's stronghold, the city's white, working-class, inner-city wards. His support improved in traditionally Republican White Anglo-Saxon Protestant precincts along Chicago's lakeshore. Thompson carried the Black vote by more than 10 to 1, taking the three wards of Chicago's "Black Belt" by more than 59,000 votes. The Associated Press credited the Black vote with supplying Thompson with his victory. According to one study, Thompson received 42.20 percent of the Polish-American vote, Dever 54.07 percent and Robertson 3.73 percent; other sources suggest Thompson may have carried as much as 46 percent of the Polish-American vote. By some accounts, Thompson carried 41 percent of the Czech-American vote and 43 percent of the Lithuanian-American vote, groups that typically firmly supported Democrats. He also won more than 60 percent of the German-American and Swedish-American votes, as well as the Italian-American and Jewish votes. Edward Mazur divided his study of the Jewish vote into two groups, the European/German Jews and the Eastern European Jews. He found that Eastern European Jewish precincts were carried by Thompson 55 to 41 percent, while the German Jewish precincts were carried by Dever 62 to 35 percent.

Mayor of Chicago 1927 (General Election)
Party	Candidate	Votes	%
Republican	William Hale Thompson	515,716	51.58
Democratic	William Emmett Dever (incumbent)	432,678	43.28
People's Ownership Smash Crime Rings	John Dill Robertson	51,347	5.14
Socialist	George Koop	2	0.00
Total votes		999,743	100.00

Results by ward
Ward	Dever	Dever %	Thompson	Thompson %	Robertson	Robertson %	Koop	Koop %
1st	11,076	70.38%	3,931	24.98%	731	4.64%	–	–
2nd	1,791	6.76%	24,169	91.25%	526	1.99%	–	–
3rd	3,484	11.02%	27,715	87.64%	423	1.34%	–	–
4th	6,848	25.00%	20,107	73.40%	439	1.60%	–	–
5th	13,148	54.47%	10,236	42.40%	756	3.13%	–	–
6th	12,220	51.02%	10,843	45.27%	887	3.70%	–	–
7th	15,416	52.33%	12,969	44.02%	1,077	3.70%	–	–
8th	13,226	47.19%	13,256	47.30%	1,543	5.51%	–	–
9th	6,766	41.70%	7,654	47.17%	1,805	11.12%	–	–
10th	4,547	34.07%	7,913	59.29%	886	6.64%	–	–
11th	6,882	54.55%	5,253	41.64%	480	3.80%	–	–
12th	8,433	44.06%	10,031	52.41%	676	3.53%	–	–
13th	6,379	65.29%	3,214	32.89%	178	1.82%	–	–
14th	10,163	55.90%	7,685	42.27%	332	1.83%	–	–
15th	15,268	50.54%	13,437	44.48%	1,506	4.98%	–	–
16th	9,049	47.57%	9,288	48.82%	687	3.61%	–	–
17th	8,389	45.51%	8,977	48.70%	1,069	5.80%	–	–
18th	11,727	49.63%	10,803	45.72%	1,098	4.65%	–	–
19th	15,822	49.82%	14,240	44.83%	1,699	5.35%	–	–
20th	4,200	34.12%	7,822	63.55%	286	2.32%	–	–
21st	6,239	48.53%	6,167	47.97%	451	3.51%	–	–
22nd	7,721	57.96%	4,688	35.19%	913	6.85%	–	–
23rd	10,282	55.42%	7,338	39.55%	934	5.03%	–	–
24th	8,174	58.89%	5,361	38.63%	344	2.48%	–	–
25th	6,740	56.58%	4,608	38.68%	564	4.73%	–	–
26th	4,853	40.02%	6,948	57.30%	325	2.68%	–	–
27th	7,164	42.47%	8,565	50.78%	1,139	6.75%	–	–
28th	6,035	33.44%	10,377	57.50%	1,635	9.06%	–	–
29th	12,059	49.35%	11,095	45.40%	1,283	5.25%	–	–
30th	16,998	53.28%	13,479	42.25%	1,424	4.46%	–	–
31st	3,864	41.98%	5,069	55.07%	272	2.95%	–	–
32nd	5,392	48.58%	5,204	46.89%	503	4.53%	–	–
33rd	5,603	47.69%	5,562	47.34%	585	4.98%	–	–
34th	6,416	50.22%	5,812	45.50%	547	4.28%	–	–
35th	4,254	29.11%	9,150	62.61%	1,208	8.27%	2	0.01%
36th	5,027	30.05%	10,293	61.54%	1,407	8.41%	–	–
37th	14,647	42.70%	16,366	47.71%	3,288	9.59%	–	–
38th	6,431	40.35%	8,529	53.51%	978	6.14%	–	–
39th	13,621	43.72%	15,709	50.43%	1,822	5.85%	–	–
40th	9,877	33.26%	18,139	61.08%	1,681	5.66%	–	–
41st	10,961	36.60%	17,212	57.47%	1,778	5.94%	–	–
42nd	6,879	50.63%	6,255	46.03%	454	3.34%	–	–
43rd	5,601	37.65%	8,431	56.68%	844	5.67%	–	–
44th	6,887	42.54%	8,386	51.79%	918	5.67%	–	–
45th	5,897	36.36%	9,378	57.83%	942	5.81%	–	–
46th	6,668	38.39%	9,515	54.78%	1,188	6.84%	–	–
47th	7,893	34.61%	12,754	55.92%	2,161	9.47%	–	–
48th	8,037	42.79%	9,619	51.22%	1,125	5.99%	–	–
49th	16,797	55.14%	12,233	40.16%	1,433	4.70%	–	–
50th	10,827	40.30%	13,935	51.86%	2,107	7.84%	–	–
Total	432,678	43.28%	515,716	51.58%	51,347	5.14%	2	0.00%

== Aftermath ==
The results of the election damaged Chicago's reputation nationally. Will Rogers remarked that "They was trying to beat Bill [Thompson] with the Better Element vote. The trouble with Chicago is that there ain't much Better Element." (Note: Rogers is sometimes erroneously said to have written this in response to Thompson's 1915 victory.) The St. Louis Star declared that "Chicago is still a good deal of a Wild West town, where a soapbox showman extracting white rabbits from a gentleman's plug hat still gets a better hearing than a man in a sober suit talking business." The campaign was such that philosopher Will Durant wondered whether democracy was dead.

The election of Thompson attracted not just national, but also strong international attention. The British The Daily News newspaper declared that the election affirmed the validity of, "the description of Chicago as the most lawless city in the world," and wrote,

[I]t isn't merely the manner wherein Chicago elects its mayor that is profoundly startling, but the kind of man it elects as Mayor. The successful candidate has already been dismissed from office for graft. He has declared himself wet and promised before election that he would break any policeman who tried to interfere with drinking. The manner wherein the election was fought imperiled the whole principle of democracy. The result of it made it, so far as Chicago is concerned, ridiculous."

Many experts concluded that Thompson had won because of his skilled campaigning, providing entertainment while Dever called for virtue. Elmer Davis of Harper's Magazine mused that the mystery was not that Dever lost but that he had received 430,000 votes. George Schottenhamel, writing in 1952 for the Journal of the Illinois State Historical Society, argued that Dever "would have been easy opposition for any candidate" running "on a campaign of 'Dever and Decency' despite four years of rampant crime in Chicago". The New York Daily News credited opposition to Dever's enforcement of Prohibition and Thompson's pledge to cease such enforcement as key to Thompson's victory, expressing hope that it would warn leaders of other large city's not to enforce "the tyrannous nonsense that is prohibition". However, the newspaper also decried the result as a "victory of a political haymaker over a sincere man", calling Dever "an earnest and an honest mayor as far as can be discerned", and characterizing Thompson as holding a political record "of administrative rottenness surpassed only by certain Tammany pirates of fifty years ago."

The New York Times regarded Thompson's victory to be "a blow" to the power of Frank Orren Lowden, as it was anticipated to give Thompson and Deneen control over Cook County's delegates to the 1928 Republican National Convention. Thompson had previously unfulfilled ambitions to run on the Republican Party presidential ticket in 1920. In the immediate aftermath of his victory, The New York Times observed that, "these ambitions have been fired anew by his success in the Mayoralty election."

No news outlets had expected Robertson to win. The Chicago Tribune noted that he had finished a "poor third" and polled "only" 51,209 votes; The Daily Independent of Murphysboro considered him to have finished at a "hopeless third". Koop's performance of two votes was picked up by the Associated Press and used by an editorial of the Ottawa Citizen as evidence that the threat of socialism was overblown. Communist leader Arne Swabeck called the election "one of the greatest mud-slinging contests ever managed by the 'celebrated' American political parties," and opined that it demonstrated how labor voters should cease "awarding friends and punishing enemies" of capitalist politicians in the major political parties.

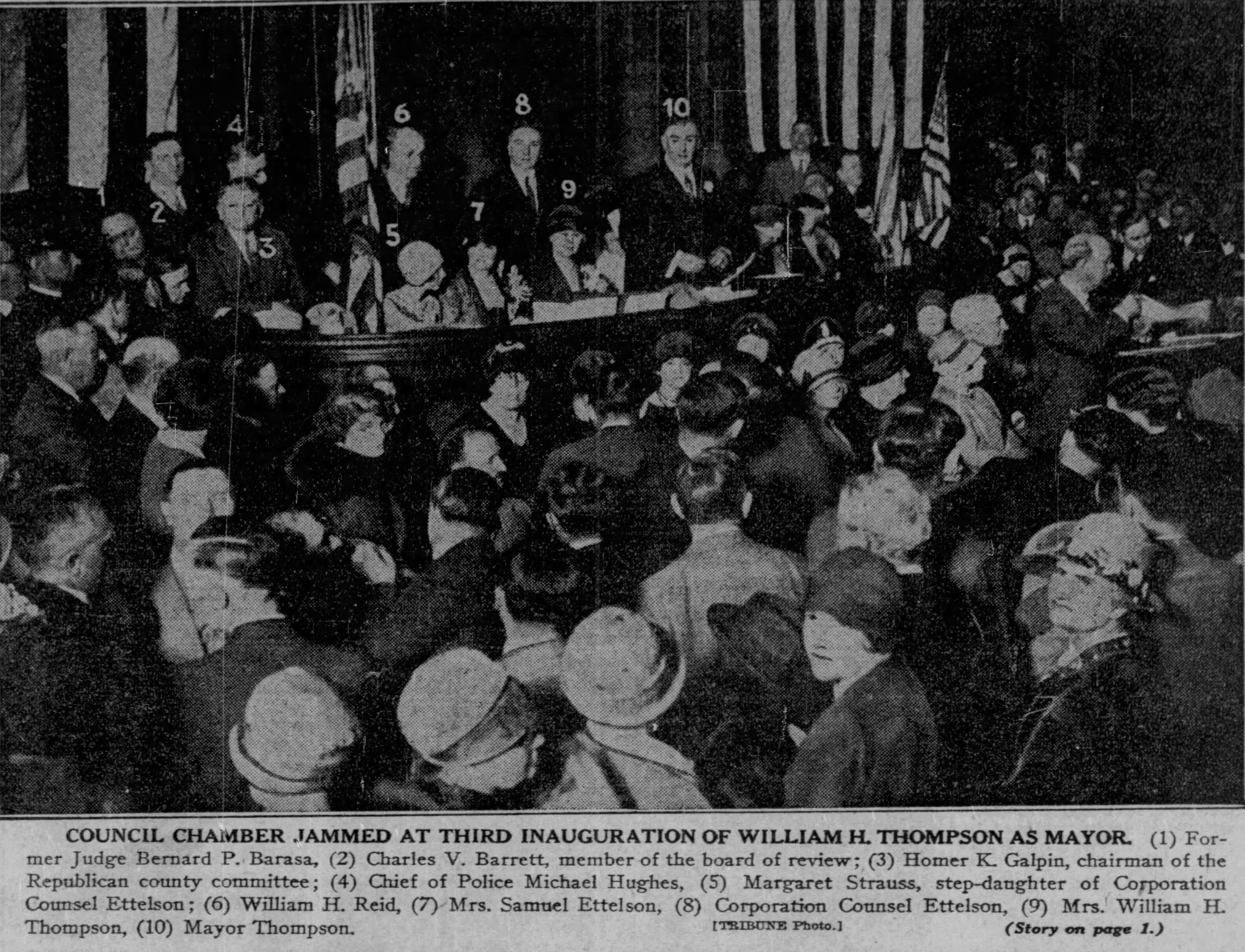
Thompson's subsequent mayoral inauguration

In his inaugural address, Thompson reiterated his pledge to oust Superintendent McAndrew. In August 1927, the Chicago Board of Education, now under Thompson's influence after he appointed a number new members, voted to charge McAndrew with insubordination and unpatriotic "conduct incompatible and inconsistent with, and in direct violation" of his duties, suspending him pending an administrative hearing held by the board. The administrative hearing would last months, and the Chicago Board of Education would find McAndrew guilty. The Cook County Superior Court would later void this decision.

Thompson would lose to Democrat Anton Cermak in the 1931 Chicago mayoral election as his public approval fell victim to continuing crime and the Great Depression. Historians generally consider Thompson one of the most unethical mayors in American history, in large part due to his alliance with Capone. Dever would serve as the vice president of a bank and died of pancreatic cancer in 1929. Robertson was re-elected by the West Park to serve as its president two days after the mayoral election, and died in 1931 of heart disease. To date, this is the last mayoral election in Chicago won by a Republican candidate. (Note: Chicago mayoral elections became nonpartisan in 1995, effective 1999. Since that time, all the winners—Richard M. Daley, Rahm Emanuel, Lori Lightfoot, and Brandon Johnson—have been de facto Democrats.)

In the 21st century, Thompson and his 1927 campaign have both been analyzed by some modern writers as precursors to the political career of Donald Trump and Trumpism.

== Gallery ==
Selected newspaper headlines
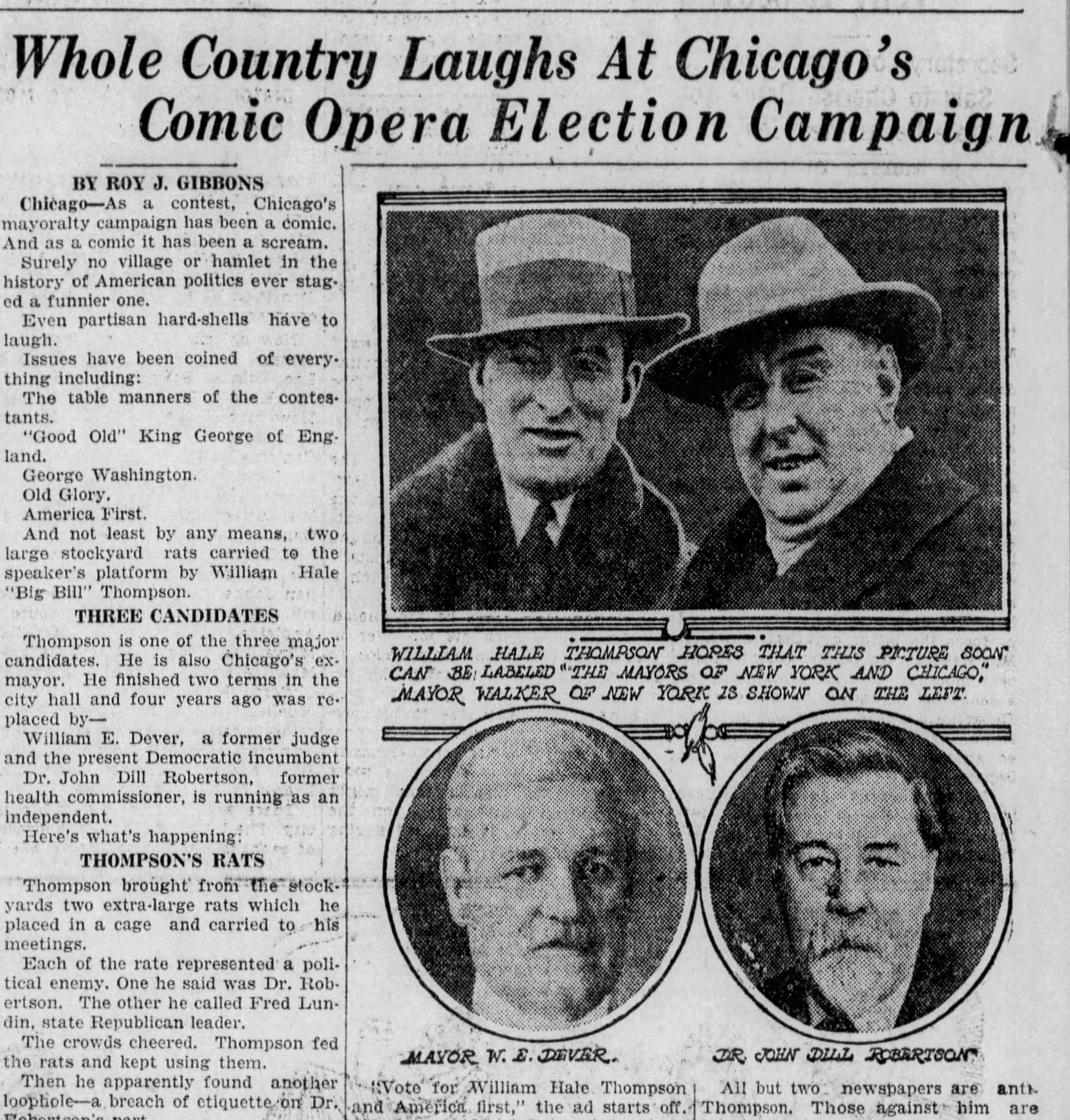
"Whole Country Laughs at Chicago's Comic Opera Election Campaign" (run in The Appleton Post Crescent on April 4, 1927)

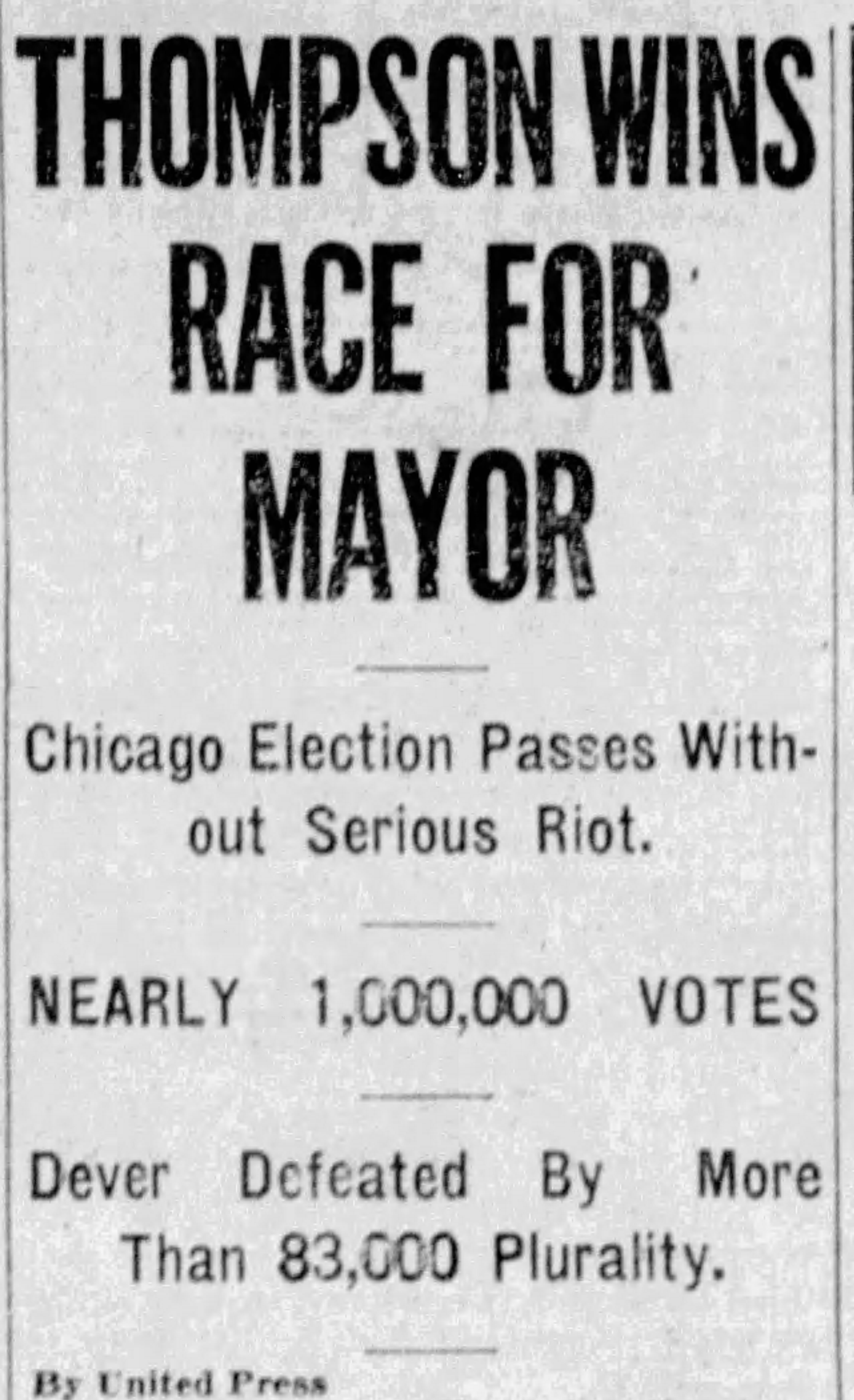
United Press International headline on Thompson's victory with a sub-header remarking on the relative lack of election day violence. Run in The Knoxville News Sentinel on April 6, 1927.

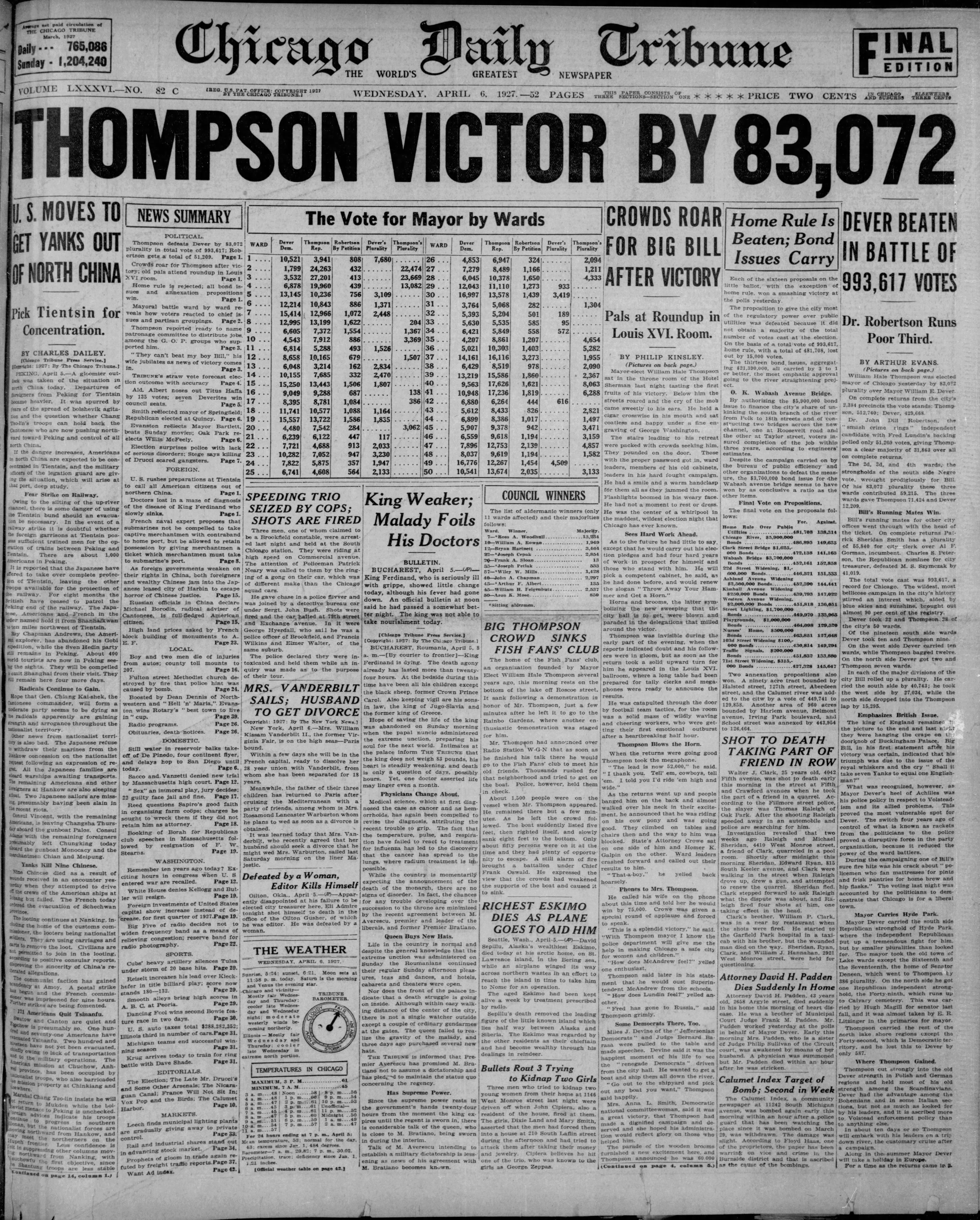
April 6, 1927 post-election cover page of the Chicago Tribune
Chicago Tribune political cartoons
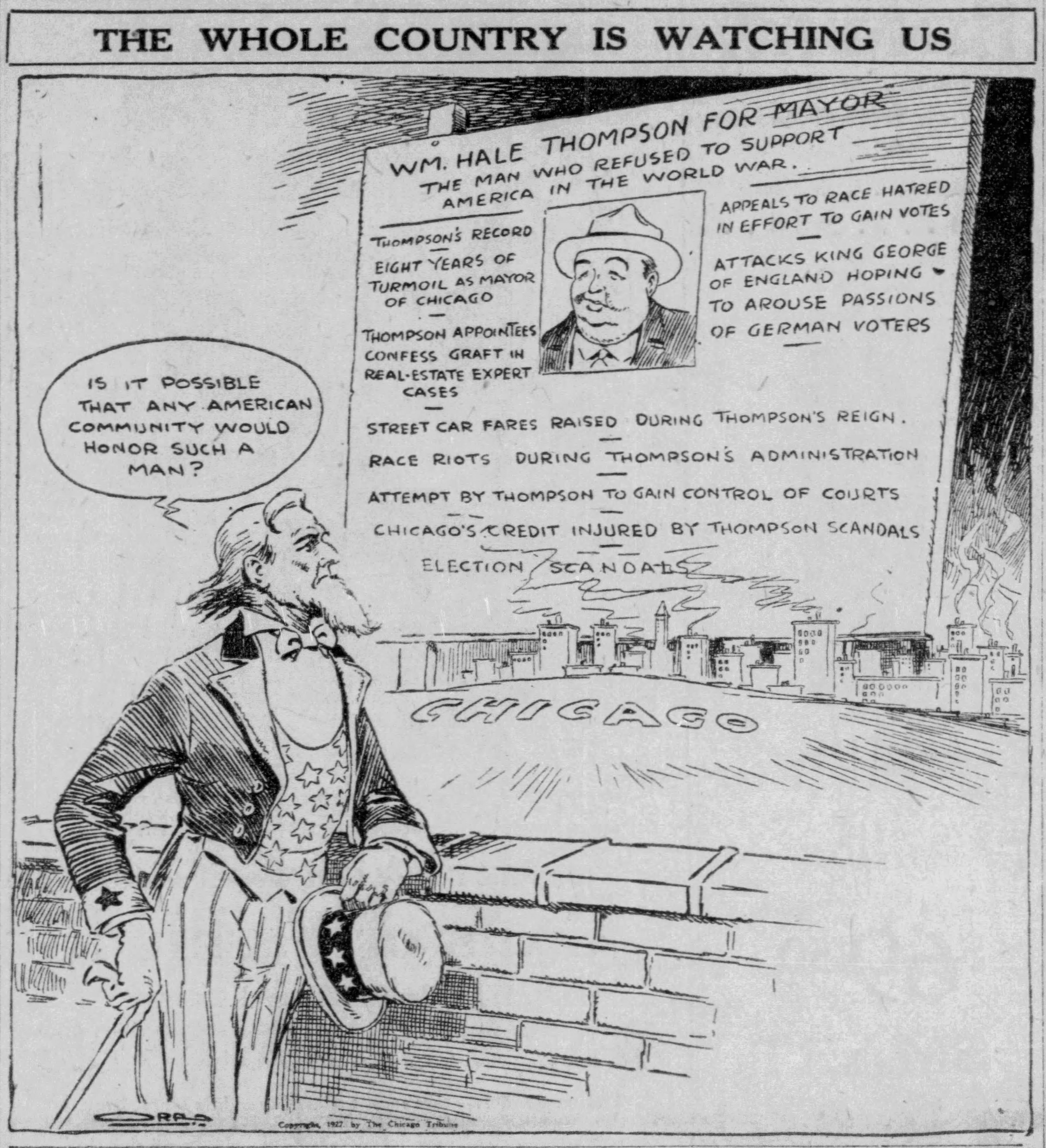
"The Whole Country Is Watching Us"; an anti-Thompson cartoon run on the front page of the Chicago Tribune on the eve of the general election depicting Uncle Sam asking, "is it possible that any American community would honor such a man?" while reading a sign listing negative aspects about Thompson. The cartoon alleges that, in his campaign, Thompson had appealed "to race hatred in effort to gain vote", and attacked King George of England "to arouse passions of German voters".

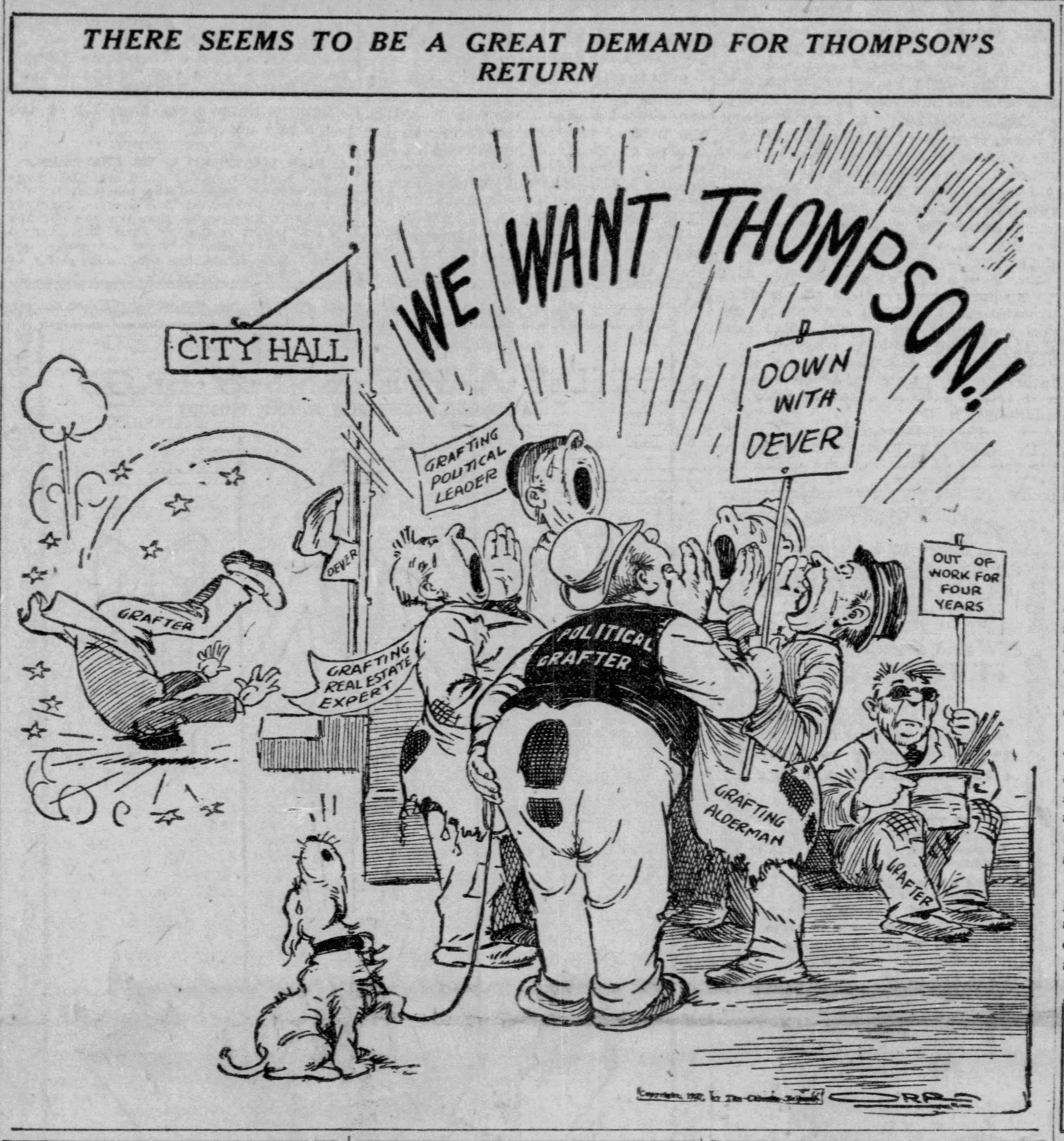
Anti-Thompson cartoon run on the front page of the Chicago Tribune on March 28 depicting a "great demand for Thompson's return" among various sorts of grafters that Dever is depicted as having kicked out of City Hall and put "out of work for four years"

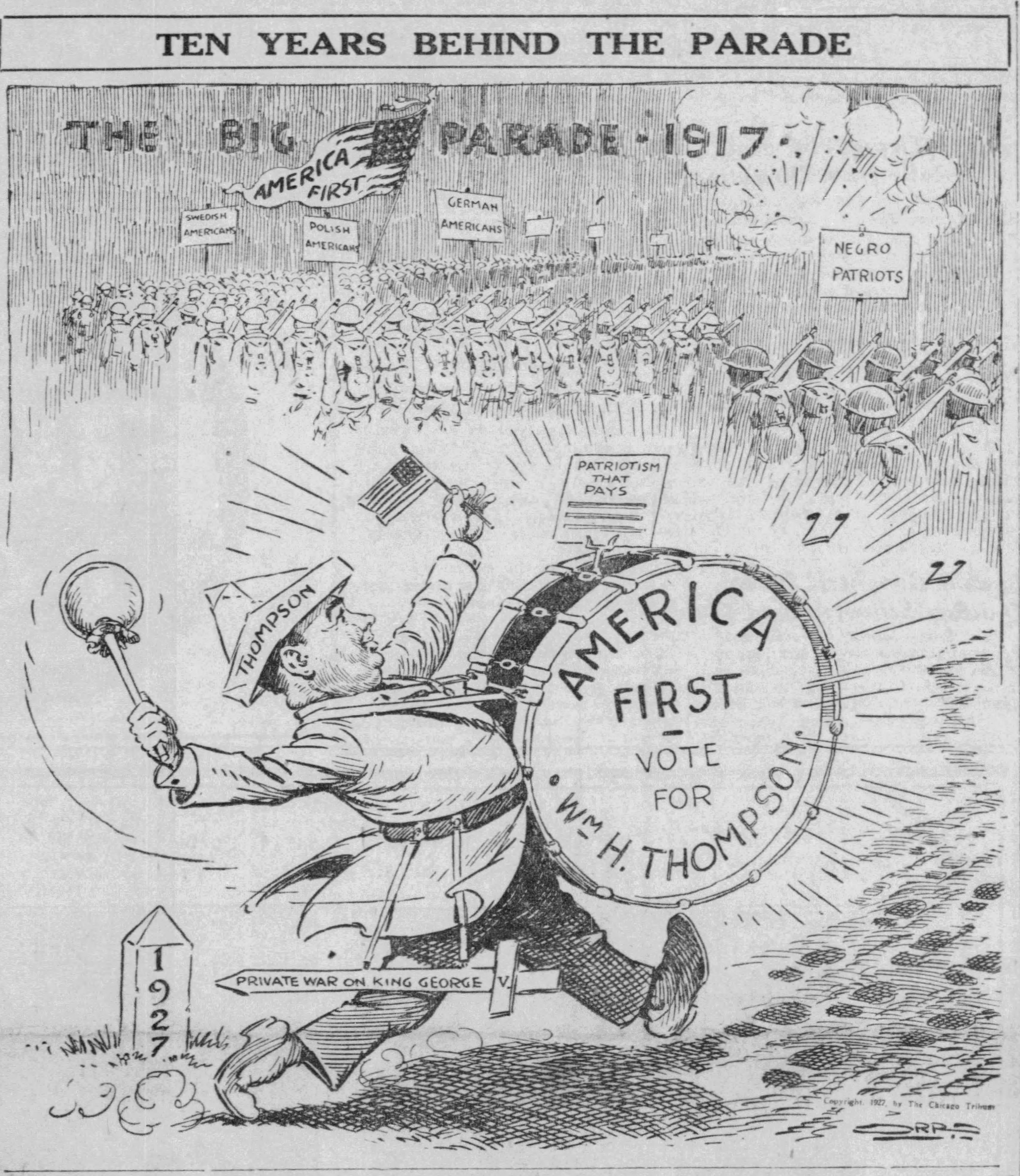
"Ten Years Behind the Parade"; an anti-Thompson cartoon run on the front page of the Chicago Tribune on March 24 depicts Thompson marching ten years behind "The Big Parade 1917". This alludes to the United States' effort in World War I, as Thompson had been a public opponent of United States entrance into that war in 1917. This cartoon criticizes Thompson for claiming patriotism to his advantage, while having failed to support the U.S. war effort a decade prior.

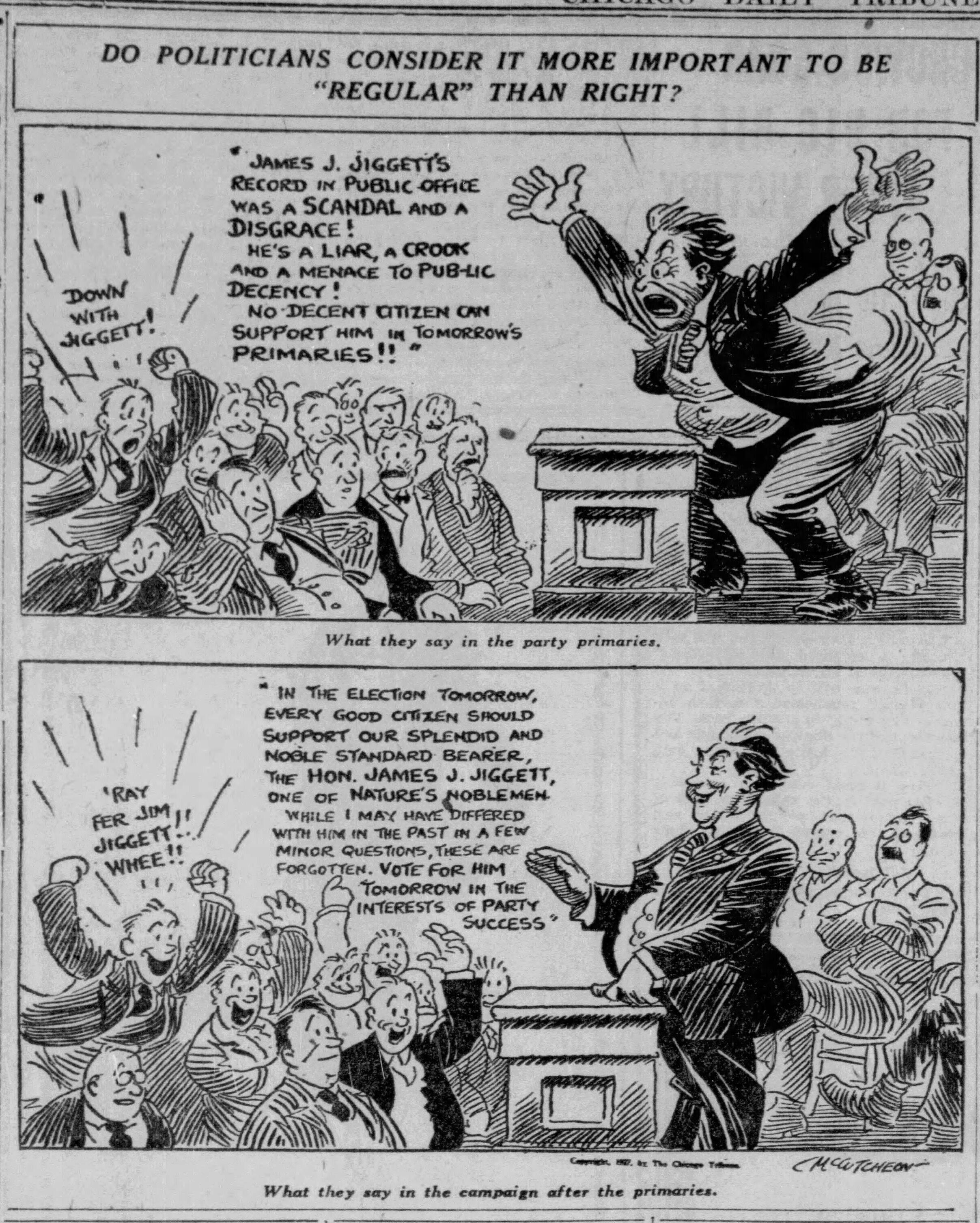
Chicago Tribune political cartoon published the day after the election deploring politicians for publicly endorsing candidates in general elections who they had previously condemned strongly during preceding primary elections.

== Works cited ==
- Bright, John (1930). Hizzoner Big Bill Thompson, an idyll of Chicago. New York, New York: Jonathan Cape and Harrison Smith. OCLC 557783528.
- Bukowski, Douglas (1998). Big Bill Thompson, Chicago, and the Politics of Image. Urbana, Illinois and Chicago, Illinois: University of Illinois Press. ISBN 0-252-02365-X.
- Eig, Jonathan (2010). Get Capone: The Secret Plot That Captured America's Most Wanted Gangster. New York, New York: Simon & Schuster. ISBN 978-1-4165-8059-1.
- Grossman, Mark (2008). Political Corruption in America: An Encyclopedia of Scandals, Power, and Greed. Armenia, New York: Grey House Publishing. ISBN 978-1-59237-297-3.
- Kantowicz, Edward (1972). "The Emergence of the Polish-Democratic Vote in Chicago". Polish American Studies. 29 (1): 67–80. JSTOR 20147849.
- Schmidt, John R. (1989). "The Mayor Who Cleaned Up Chicago" A Political Biography of William E. Dever. DeKalb, Illinois: Northern Illinois University Press. ISBN 0-87580-144-7.
- Schmidt, John R. (1995). "William E. Dever (1923–1927)". In Green, Paul M.; Holli, Melvin G. (eds.). The Mayors: The Chicago Political Tradition (Revised ed.). Carbondale, Illinois and Edwardsville, Illinois: Southern Illinois University Press. pp. 82–98. ISBN 0-8093-1963-2.
- Schottenhamel, George (1952). "How Big Bill Thompson Won Control of Chicago". Journal of the Illinois State Historical Society. 45 (1): 30–49. JSTOR 40189189.
- Teaford, Jon C. (1993). Cities of the Heartland: The Rise and Fall of the Industrial Midwest. Bloomington, Indiana: Indiana University Press. ISBN 0-253-20914-5.
