= 1927 Chicago aldermanic election =

← 1925	February 22 and April 5, 1927	1929 →

All 50 seats in the Chicago City Council 26 seats needed for a majority
	Majority party	Minority party
Party	Democratic	Republican
Seats won	31	19
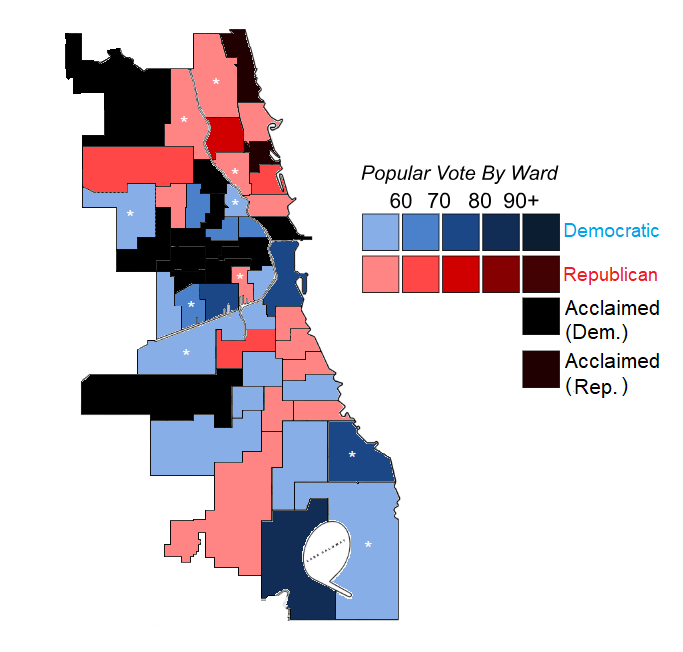
- Results by ward. The map shows the winning candidate's party affiliations even though aldermen ran as nonpartisans. A white asterisk (*) means the results for that ward were decided in a runoff vote.

The 1927 Chicago aldermanic election happened on February 22 to elect the 50 aldermen of the Chicago City Council, on the same day as the primary elections for the mayoral election. Candidates ran as nonpartisans, and if no candidate received a majority of votes in a given ward the top two candidates in that ward faced off in a runoff election on April 5, the same day as the general mayoral election.

All told, despite the nonpartisan nature of the elections, Democrats won 31 of the seats while Republicans won 19. 10 wards necessitated runoff elections, of which Democrats won 6 and Republicans 4. 13 aldermen—11 Democrats and two Republicans—were returned without opposition.
