= Edward Herbert Wright =

American politician

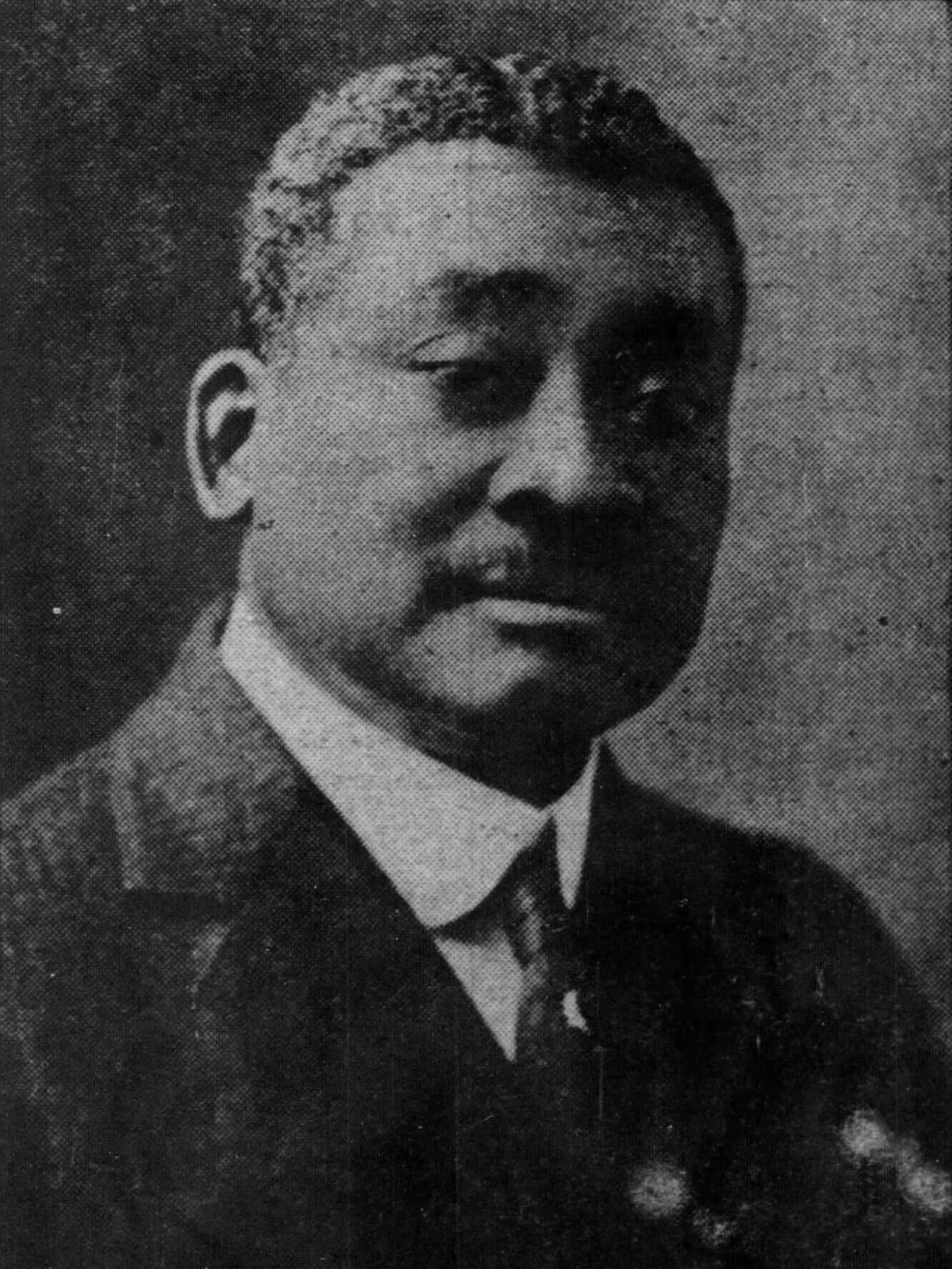
Wright circa 1927

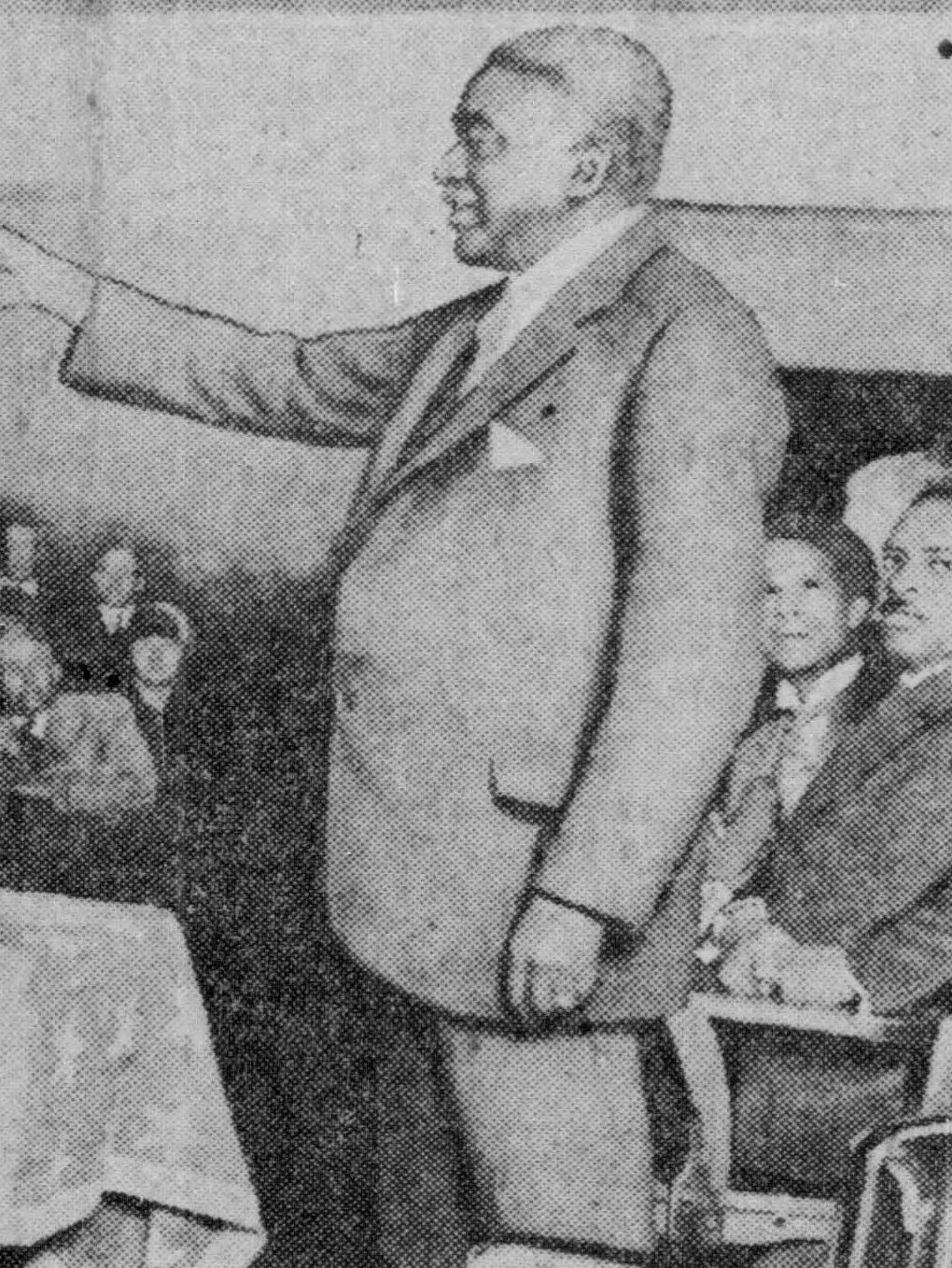
Wright in 1927

Edward Herbert Wright (September 28, 1863 – August 6, 1930) was an American politician and political activist who helped play a pivotal early role in African-American political participation in Chicago.

== Early life and education ==
Wright was born on September 28, 1863, in New York City.

A graduate of the College of the City of New York at 17 years old, Wright taught in New Jersey for three years. After his arrival in Chicago while looking for a job, Wright found odd jobs such as assisting a Pullman porter, working as a real estate office assistant and working in the registry department of the post office.

== Career ==
He soon caught the eye of local elected officials, and was hired into the county clerk’s office. Wright participated in the 1888 Republican National Convention, which was hosted in Chicago, and was rewarded for his work by being hired as bookkeeper and railroad incorporation clerk in the secretary of state’s office, the first African-American to be appointed to a clerical position in state government. After Secretary Isaac N. Pearson's term ended, Wright left his position to work in the Chicago city clerk’s office for two years. He was then elected 1895 for a one-year term as South Town clerk, and helped secure the 1894 election of Theodore W. Jones as Cook County commissioner, the second African-American to be elected to the commission (and a relative of John Jones, the first African-American elected to the commission in 1872). By 1896, Wright became the third African-American county commissioner, and was also admitted to the bar that same year.

As county commissioner, Wright continued to gain work for other African-Americans in Chicago, including Ferdinand Lee Barnett as the first African American assistant state’s attorney for Cook County. Upon being re-elected to the county commission in 1898, he secured election as president pro-tem of the body. However, after he failed to be re-elected in 1900, Wright spent the next fifteen years confined largely to activism for racial equality in Republican county committee meetings.

When William Hale Thompson joined the race for mayor in 1915, Wright helped secure pledge cards for Thompson. After Thompson's election, he rewarded Wright with the position of assistant corporation counsel with a salary higher than any other African-American appointee. Wright took over Alderman Oscar Stanton De Priest's position as an organizational leader for Thompson's campaigns for senator and mayor, and was then appointed by Thompson as one of the attorneys for the Traction Commission in 1919. Wright gained increased political power when he was elected Republican committeeman of the Second Ward, a position which allowed him to nominate African-American state senators, state representatives and municipal judges and send delegates to Republican conventions. His most potent feat was nominating Albert George as a municipal judge in 1924.

Wright's career political continued until he and Thompson, who ran again for mayor in 1927, had a falling out over the nomination of a First Ward Republican committeeman. Wright backed a different candidate than Thompson, but the former's candidate lost, and Wright left politics altogether.

== Personal life and death ==
Wright moved to Rochester, Minnesota, where he died in 1930.
