= Jon C. Teaford =

American historian

Jon C. Teaford is professor emeritus in the History Department at Purdue University. He specializes in American urban history and early on in his career he specialized in legal history.

Teaford became interested in history at a young age, stemming from his fascination with president Theodore Roosevelt. He received his PhD from the University of Wisconsin in 1973; his dissertation, The Municipal Revolution in America: Origins of Modern Urban Government, 1650–1825, was also published as a book in 1975. Many of his books received critical acclaim. He retired in 2003. In 2011–2012, he served as president of the Urban History Association.

== Books ==
- Teaford, Jon (1975) The Municipal Revolution in America: Origins of Modern Urban Government, 1650–1825. Chicago, IL: University of Chicago Press.
- Teaford, Jon (1979) City and Suburb: The Political Fragmentation of Metropolitan America, 1850–1970. Baltimore, MD: Johns Hopkins University Press.
- Teaford, Jon (1984) The Unheralded Triumph: City Government in America, 1870–1900. Baltimore, MD: Johns Hopkins University Press.
- Teaford, Jon (1986) The Twentieth-Century American City: Problem, Promise, and Reality. Baltimore, MD: Johns Hopkins University Press. 3rd ed., 2016.
- Teaford, Jon (1993) Cities of the Heartland: The Rise and Fall of the Industrial Midwest. Bloomington, IN: Indiana University Press.
- Teaford, Jon (1996) Post-Suburbia: Government and Politics in the Edge Cities Baltimore, MD: Johns Hopkins University Press. (2nd ed., 2019)
- Teaford, Jon (2006) The Metropolitan Revolution: The Rise of Post-Urban America. New York: Columbia University Press.
- Teaford, Jon (2008) The American Suburb: The Basics. New York: Routledge.
