= Sixth Illinois Constitutional Convention =

The Sixth Illinois Constitutional Convention, popularly known as Con-Con, convened on December 8, 1969, and concluded on September 3, 1970. The convention produced the 1970 Illinois Constitution, the state's first new constitution in 100 years, which the voters of Illinois approved in a special election in December 1970.

== Election ==
The 116 delegates to the convention were elected in nonpartisan elections in the fall of 1969. Interest from candidates was high: over 500 petitions for candidacy were filed.

On September 23, a primary election was held, with turnout of 18%. The top four vote-getters in each of the state's 58 legislative districts advanced to the general election. The general election was held on November 18, 1969, with turnout of 27%. The top two vote-getters in each district in the general election became delegates. Candidates for delegate had to meet the same criteria as candidates for state senate, including being at least 25 years old.

The elected delegates included 13 women, 15 African Americans (two of whom were women), and 34 people under age 40. Fifty-six of the delegates were lawyers; there were also eleven educators, five farmers, and five bankers, among many other occupations represented. Ninety-six had college degrees.

The delegate elections were not without controversy. Some Chicago-area districts saw sharp battles between "independent" candidates backed by the Independent Voters of Illinois and candidates backed by the "regular Democratic party". In the 24th district on Chicago's south side, after coming in fourth in the primary, independent candidate Michael Shakman filed a lawsuit in federal court. He sought an injunction to prevent the city from requiring its workers to campaign for his opponents as a condition of their patronage hiring. The lawsuit was dismissed, but eventually reinstated, and gave rise to the Shakman Decrees.

== Officers ==
The president of the convention was Samuel W. Witwer, an attorney from Kenilworth, who for that reason has sometimes been called "the father of the Illinois constitution". Odas Nicholson, an attorney from Chicago, was elected as secretary. Nicholson, an African American woman, was the convention's only officer who was not a white man.

The vice presidents of the convention were Elbert S. Smith of Decatur, Thomas G. Lyons of Chicago, and John Alexander of Virden. Alexander, who was 27 years old and had never held elective office, was the only officer to face opposition. However, he prevailed by a strong margin over his sole opponent, Betty Howard of St. Charles, who received only 29 votes from the floor.

Lyons and Nicholson were described in the press as representing "organization Democrats", while Alexander was described as representing the delegates who were under age 40.

== Delegates ==
Over the 1969-1970 holiday break, Witwer assigned the delegates to committees and appointed a chair of each committee. There were nine substantive committees and three procedural committees. Witwer himself was an ex officio member of all the committees, and the vice presidents were ex officio members of the committees to which he assigned them.

Legislative district	Name	Committees
1	Samuel W. Witwer	Public Information, Rules and Credentials, Style and Drafting
1	Frank Cicero, Jr.	Revenue and Finance, Style and Drafting
2	Lucy Reum	Legislative
2	Thomas J. McCracken	General Government
3	John G. Woods	Local Government, Public Information
3	Virginia Macdonald	Bill of Rights
4	Clyde Parker	Education
4	Anne H. Evans	Education
5	John E. Dvorak	Bill of Rights
5	Anne Willer	Judiciary
6	Martin Ozinga, Jr.	Revenue and Finance
6	James E. Gierach	Executive Article
7	Joseph A. Tecson	Executive Article
7	Roy C. Pechous	Bill of Rights
8	Ray H. Garrison	Revenue and Finance
8	Thomas H. Miller	Suffrage and Constitution Amending
9	Joan G. Anderson	Local Government, Rules and Credentials
9	Joseph T. Meek	Revenue and Finance, Rules and Credentials
10	Peter A. Tomei	Suffrage and Constitution Amending
10	Paul F. Elward	Revenue and Finance, Rules and Credentials
11	Martin Tuchow	Revenue and Finance
11	Bernard Weisberg	Bill of Rights, Rules and Credentials
12	Dawn Clark Netsch	Revenue and Finance
12	Malcolm S. Kamin	Education
13	Ronald C. Smith	Executive Article
13	Elmer Gertz	Bill of Rights
14	John F. Leon	Executive Article
14	William J. Laurino	Legislative
15	Thomas G. Lyons	Legislative, Revenue and Finance, Public Information, Rules and Credentials, Style and Drafting
15	David E. Stahl	Local Government, Public Information
16	William F. Lennon	Suffrage and Constitution Amending
16	James E. Strunck	Revenue and Finance, Rules and Credentials
17	Harold M. Nudelman	Judiciary
17	Frank Orlando	Executive Article
18	Edward J. Rosewell	General Government, Style and Drafting
18	Leonard N. Foster	Bill of Rights
19	Joseph C. Sharpe, Sr.	Suffrage and Constitution Amending, Style and Drafting
19	William A. Jaskula	Suffrage and Constitution Amending, Style and Drafting
20	Victor A. Arrigo	Bill of Rights
20	Madison L. Brown	Local Government
21	Frank D. Stemberk	Legislative
21	Gloria S. Pughsley	Education
22	Samuel A. Patch	Education, Style and Drafting
22	James Kemp	Bill of Rights
23	Richard M. Daley	Local Government, Style and Drafting
23	Leonard F. Miska	Revenue and Finance
24	Odas Nicholson	Judiciary
24	Albert A. Raby	Bill of Rights
25	Francis X. Lawlor	Bill of Rights
25	Louis Marolda	Executive Article
26	Thomas E. Hunter	Judiciary, Rules and Credentials
26	Clifford P. Kelley	Legislative, Public Information
27	Michael J. Madigan	General Government
27	Joseph Rachunas	Judiciary
28	Philip J. Carey	Local Government
28	Ted A. Borek	Local Government
29	Charles A. Coleman	Executive Article
29	Richard K. Cooper	Revenue and Finance
30	David Linn	Judiciary
30	Mary Lee Leahy	General Government, Style and Drafting
31	John D. Wenum	Local Government
31	Mary A. Pappas	Legislative
32	Jeannette Mullen	Revenue and Finance, Rules and Credentials
32	Jeffrey R. Ladd	Judiciary
33	Stanley C. Johnson	Revenue and Finance
33	Maxine Wymore	General Government
34	Robert R. Canfield	General Government
34	Betty Ann Keegan	Local Government, Rules and Credentials
35	Harlan Rigney	Executive Article
35	Wayne W. Whalen	Judiciary, Style and Drafting
36	Louis James Perona	Legislative
36	Edwin F. Peterson	Local Government
37	Paul E. Mathias	Education
37	David Davis	General Government, Rules and Credentials
38	Betty Howard	Education, Public Information
38	James S. Brannen	Revenue and Finance
39	Thomas C. Kelleghan	Bill of Rights
39	W. A. Sommerschield	Legislative, Rules and Credentials
40	Helen C. Kinney	Judiciary
40	Anthony M. Peccarelli	Legislative, Style and Drafting
41	Louis F. Bottino	Education Committee
41	Arthur T. Lennon	Bill of Rights
42	John L. Knuppel	Legislative
42	James S. Thompson	General Government
43	Lewis D. Wilson	Bill of Rights, Style and Drafting
43	William R. Armstrong	General Government, Public Information
44	Charles R. Young	Executive Article, Style and Drafting
44	Edward H. Jenison	General Government
45	David E. Connor	General Government
45	John C. Parkhurst	Local Government
46	Samuel L. Martin	Legislative
46	Donald D. Zeglis	Local Government
47	Charles W. Shuman	Suffrage and Constitution Amending
47	Henry I. Green	Suffrage and Constitution Amending, Public Information
48	Clarence E. Yordy	Judiciary
48	William D. Fogal	Education
49	Maurice W. Scott	Revenue and Finance
49	William L. Fay	Judiciary
50	Elbert S. Smith	Bill of Rights, General Government, Local Government, Public Information, Rules and Credentials, Style and Drafting
50	Franklin E. Dove	Education
51	Dwight P. Friedrich	Executive Article
51	James S. Parker	Executive Article
52	Stanley L. Klaus	Suffrage and Constitution Amending
52	John Alexander	Education, Judiciary, Suffrage and Constitution Amending, Public Information, Rules and Credentials, Style and Drafting
53	Wendell Durr	Revenue and Finance
53	Ray Johnsen	Local Government
54	William F. Fennoy, Jr.	Bill of Rights
54	John M. Karns, Jr.	Revenue and Finance
55	J. L. Buford	Education
55	Henry C. Hendren, Jr.	Suffrage and Constitution Amending
56	Ralph Dunn	Local Government
56	David Kenney	Revenue and Finance, Public Information
57	Clifford L. Downen	Revenue and Finance
57	Robert L. Butler	Local Government
58	Matthew A. Hutmacher	Bill of Rights, Rules and Credentials
58	George J. Lewis	Legislative

== Outcomes ==
The voters of Illinois approved the convention's new constitution in a special election held on December 15, 1970. The constitution was approved by a 55.5% majority, with 37% turnout. Seventy-two downstate counties voted against the constitution, but strong majorities in the Chicago area allowed it to pass.
