= Odas Nicholson =

American lawyer and judge (1924–2012)

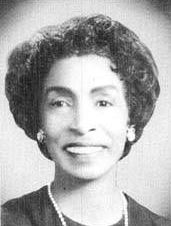
- Photograph of Odas Nicholson published in Illinois Blue Book.

Delegate to Sixth Illinois Constitutional Convention
- In office 1969–1970

Cook County Circuit Court judge
- In office 1980–1994

Personal details
- Born: March 25, 1924 Pickens, Mississippi
- Died: March 10, 2012 (aged 87) Chicago, Illinois
- Party: Democratic Party
- Education: Marshall High School; Kennedy–King College; DePaul University

Odas Nicholson (March 25, 1924 – March 10, 2012) was an attorney, activist and judge in Illinois.

Nicholson was a delegate to and secretary of the Sixth Illinois Constitutional Convention, which produced Illinois' first new constitution in 100 years. In that capacity she is credited with two key provisions of the Constitution of Illinois: the prohibition on gender discrimination and the language in the preamble numbering among the purposes of the constitution to "eliminate poverty and inequality". Nicholson was closely associated with the Daley machine. Litigation contesting her election as a constitutional convention delegate gave rise to the Shakman Decree, which shaped Illinois and Chicago politics for decades.

She was the first African American woman in a number of roles, including being the first to graduate from DePaul College of Law, the first to helm the Women's Bar Association of Illinois, and the first to serve as a judge in the Law Division of the Cook County Circuit Court.

== Early life and education ==
Nicholson was born the youngest of seven children on a farm in Pickens, Mississippi. At the age of 13, after her mother's death, Nicholson traveled from Mississippi, where educational segregation barred her from attending high school, to Chicago where she lived with her brother's family.

She graduated from Marshall High School in 1942 and subsequently attended Wilson Junior College (now Kennedy–King College). As a child Nicholson had planned to become a teacher like many other members of her family, but positive feedback from a judge in an oratory contest sponsored by the Chicago Herald-American inspired her to consider a legal career. After graduating from Wilson she worked as secretary to Earl Dickerson.

Nicholson graduated from DePaul University in Chicago with a Ph.B. degree in 1947, and an L.L.B. in 1948. She was the first African American woman to graduate from DePaul's law school.

== Career ==
Nicholson was admitted to the Illinois bar in 1948. For much of her legal career, Nicholson worked as a trial attorney for the Supreme Life Insurance company, where Earl Dickerson was general counsel, while also maintaining a private practice. During this period she also served as secretary of the Women's Bar Association of Illinois, of which she would later become president.

In the 1950s Nicholson served as chair of the redress committee of the Chicago NAACP, and provided pro bono representation for dozens of civil rights plaintiffs. During this period she also served multiple terms as head of the Joint Negro Appeal and the Professional Woman's Club, and as vice president of the Cook County Bar Association.

=== Constitutional convention election ===
In 1969, Nicholson campaigned successfully to be one of two delegates to the Illinois constitutional convention from the 24th legislative district, which covered parts of the South Side of Chicago. She was the only delegate anywhere in the state who ran on a platform of gender equality. Nicholson opposed proposals for judges to be appointed instead of elected, contending that "the people have the wisdom and the right to choose their own judges and to remove them when necessary". She also favored home rule for cities and strong civil rights protections, although these positions were shared by the other candidates.

The election consisted of a top-four primary in September followed by a top-two general election in November. Eight candidates ran in the primary for the 24th district. Nicholson received the highest number of votes in the primary, 9,188 as against 8,997 for civil rights leader Albert Raby, 7,676 for attorney Michael Shakman, and 6,755 for Attye Belle McGee, wife of the Chicago postmaster.

In the general election, the Independent Voters of Illinois backed Raby and Shakman, while the Cook County Democratic Party backed Nicholson and McGee. The Chicago Tribune endorsed Nicholson and McGee. Nicholson was also endorsed by a number of civic and legal organizations, including the National Bar Association, Cook County Bar Association, and Better Government Association. Raby and Nicholson prevailed. Nicholson received 12,069 votes to Raby's 13,919.

Shakman was the only white candidate in the general election and received strong support only from majority-white Hyde Park. Shakman accused her of being a machine candidate. After the primary, Shakman filed a federal lawsuit that led to the Shakman Decrees, which reshaped the Illinois political landscape by restricting patronage hiring.

=== Convention deliberations ===
When the constitutional convention began in December 1969, Nicholson was unanimously elected secretary. She later described this as one of the proudest moments of her career. All the other convention officials were white men, as was every committee chair; Nicholson was the only African American or woman among them. She commuted to Springfield for the convention proceedings and continued working her regular job on weekends.

Elmer Gertz, another delegate to the 1970 constitutional convention, recalled Nicholson as "a very brilliant and hard-working woman".

In addition to serving as secretary of the convention, Nicholson is remembered for her work in securing the prohibition against discrimination on the basis of sex in Article I, Section 18. The Illinois Constitution became the first state constitution to contain such a prohibition, which closely tracked the language of the Equal Rights Amendment. The committee did not recommend the proposal to the convention, so Nicholson introduced it from the convention floor on second reading of the bill of rights. The convention approved the equal rights provision by a 94–7 vote.

Nicholson drafted the preamble of the new constitution. Her draft of the preamble was adopted by an 8–6 vote of the bill of rights committee. The committee secretary Leonard Foster resigned in protest after Nicholson's preamble was adopted, accusing chairman Elmer Gertz of interference. Opponents took issue with the preamble's enumeration of specific goals for the state including "to eliminate poverty and inequality", and noted that it was out of step with other state constitution preambles. Speaking before the convention, she said that the purpose of the preamble was to assure Illinois' citizens that "the state cares about them". The 116-member convention approved what the press called "Nicholson's preamble" over the minority report by 47–35.

Nicholson served on the convention's judiciary committee. She unsuccessfully opposed the provision of the new constitution establishing the Judicial Inquiry Board with lay participation rather than an all-judge courts commission. When the provision was reported out to the convention as a whole, she spoke in favor of the minority report that retained the judicial commission. She argued that to adopt the judicial inquiry board was to say "I don't trust the judiciary". The convention, however, rejected Nicholson's minority report by 73 to 29.

Nicholson also spoke in favor of electing judges. Elmer Gertz recalled that she "fought most unyieldingly for the views of the Democratic organization on judicial selection", namely that judges should not be appointed by merit selection due to its discriminatory effect. Nicholson argued that the proposed judicial selection commission would simply add the politics of "bar associations and nominating commissions" to the existing party politics. Nicholson's view did not prevail at the convention, but it did prevail at the ballot box. The judicial selection process was put before the voters as a separate question in December 1970, and the "Appoint All Judges Amendment" failed by a 54–46 margin.

At the closing ceremonies on September 3, 1970, Nicholson presented the constitution signed by the delegates to Secretary of State Paul Powell.

In 1971, governor Richard Ogilvie appointed Nicholson to a task force overseeing the implementation of the constitution.

=== Post-convention career ===
In 1972, Nicholson ran for the Illinois House of Representatives in the 24th district. The Daley organization dropped its support for incumbent Robert E. Mann, a leader of the liberal caucus in the House, and backed Nicholson instead. Nicholson said she had always supported Mann but felt no qualms about running against him "since he didn't support me in the Con Con race". With the mayor's blessing, a group of precinct committeemen (including Cecil Partee, John Stroger, Eugene Sawyer, and Marshall Korshak) agreed to drop Mann in favor of Nicholson so that the South Side district would have all-Black representatives. Press reports described Mann as "under siege" from Nicholson's campaign. Mann, however, soundly defeated Nicholson by more than 5 to 1. Nicholson came in third in the top-two primary and was therefore eliminated from the general election ballot.

Nicholson served as president of the Women's Bar Association of Illinois from 1973 to 1974, the first African American woman in the role. During her presidency the association opened its membership to men for the first time. Nicholson also advocated for the Equal Rights Amendment during the 1970s.

In the 1970s, Nicholson worked for the Equal Employment Opportunity Commission, where she served as chief legal officer for the Chicago and Kansas City regions, before retiring with the intention of taking a break from the law.

=== Judicial career ===
In 1980, the Supreme Court of Illinois appointed Nicholson to the Circuit Court of Cook County. She won election to a full term in 1982. She was the first African American woman to serve as a judge in the circuit court's Law Division. She was also the first woman judge assigned to the motions section.

Nicholson was president of the Illinois Judicial Council from 1986 to 1987, the first woman to serve in that capacity.

In 1986, Nicholson sought appointment to the Illinois Appellate Court. In an uncommon move, the Illinois Supreme Court referred her qualifications for review by the Chicago Bar Association. The association rated her as unqualified based on a "lack of legal knowledge and ability."

Nicholson retired from the bench in 1994, having served for 14 years.

== Retirement and legacy ==
In 1995, Nicholson was inducted into the National Bar Association hall of fame. In 1997, she was one of the first class of inductees into the Hall of Fame of the Cook County Bar Association, which also included her mentor Earl Dickerson as well as Harold Washington and Carol Moseley Braun.

Nicholson was a member of the historically African American Alpha Kappa Alpha (AKA) sorority. In 2000, she became a charter member of AKA's Phi Kappa Omega chapter in Evergreen Park, Illinois. The chapter later named a scholarship in her honor.

Nicholson died on March 10, 2012, of complications from Alzheimer's disease. She was buried in the Oak Woods Cemetery in Chicago.
