= Lucy Reum =

Political figure

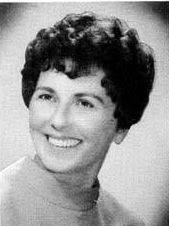
Lucy Reum from the 1969–1970 Illinois Blue Book.

Lucy Reum (July 15, 1914 – July 18, 2005) was a delegate to the Sixth Illinois Constitutional Convention and a horse racing industry reformer. As a delegate, she is credited with advocating for separating the question of whether to abolish cumulative voting from the question of whether to approve the constitution as a whole, saving the 1970 Illinois Constitution from likely defeat. In the horse racing industry she is credited with the adoption of a national fire code for horse racing facilities.

Reum was either the first woman, or among the first women, in a number of roles: one of the first 15 women to serve as delegates to any of Illinois' six constitutional conventions; one of the first three women to run for countywide office in Cook County; and the first woman to chair a state racing board.

== Early life and education ==
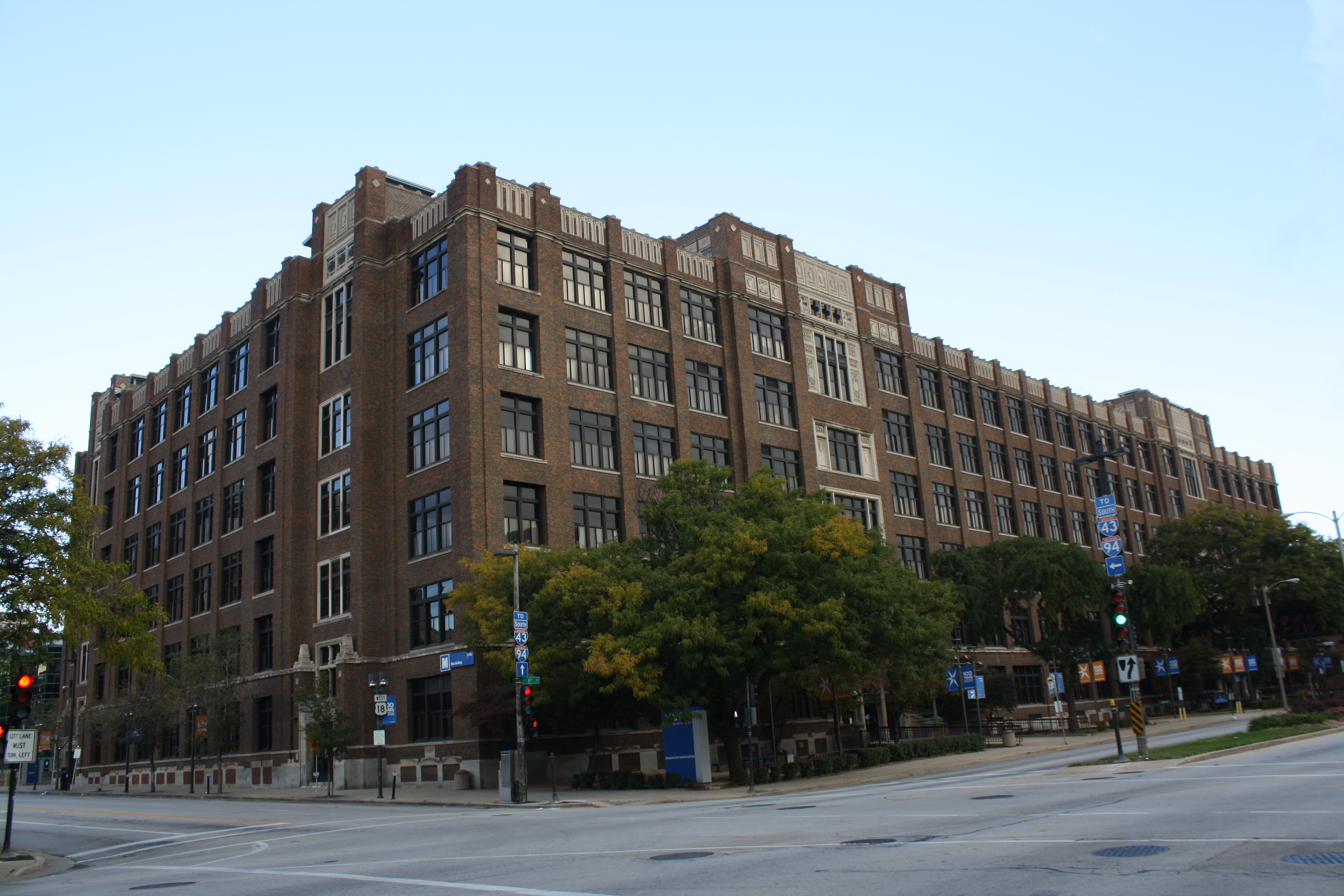
The Milwaukee Vocational School, where Reum taught in the 1930s.

Reum was born to Ukrainian parents in Edmonton, Alberta on July 15, 1914. Both of her parents were born in Lviv. Reum was born with the name Lubka Ira Bellegay, but took up the name Lucy at an early age.

The family moved to Chicago and Reum graduated third in her class from Austin High School. She received a scholarship to attend the University of Chicago in 1932. However, as her family was facing difficulties from the Great Depression, she was only able to attend because her younger sister had gotten a job paying $15 a week.

In 1936, Reum graduated cum laude from the University of Chicago with an AB degree. She sought work as a teacher, but was initially unable to find it and enrolled in a master's degree program at the university. However, she was then hired to teach at the Milwaukee Vocational School in Wisconsin.

In 1939, she married Walter J. Reum, who later became a member of the General Assembly. She worked as his legislative aide throughout his ten years in office. They remained married until his death in 1999.

== Political activity ==
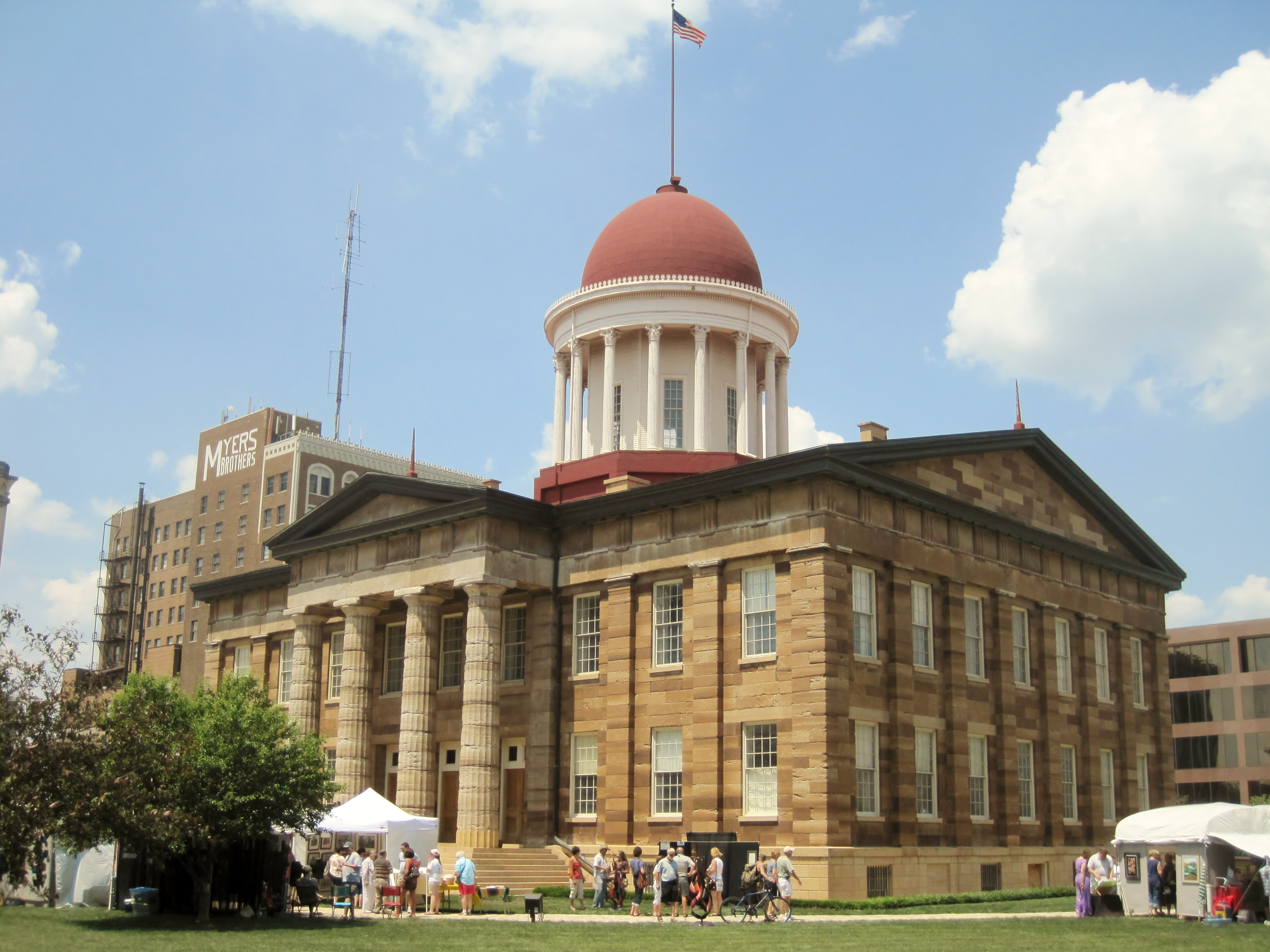
The Old State Capitol, where the constitutional convention met during 1970.

After her husband's retirement from the legislature in 1963, Reum remained active in the local Republican party and served as an alternate delegate in the 1964 Republican National Convention. She filled various party offices including township committeewoman and state central committeewoman for her congressional district. She was also active in other organizations such as the League of Women Voters and the American Association of University Women, for which she was the legislative chair.

In 1969 Reum and eight other candidates ran for election as delegates to the Sixth Illinois Constitutional Convention from the second legislative district in northwestern Cook County. Reum and three others advanced to the general election. Although the election was officially nonpartisan, two of the candidates (including Reum) were endorsed by the Republican Party and two were endorsed by the Democratic party. The district was heavily Republican but low turnout for the delegate elections favored the Democratic-endorsed candidates. Reum received the highest vote total in both the primary and the general election. Two delegates were elected from each district, and Reum's fellow delegate from the second district was the Democratic-backed Thomas McCracken Sr.

In the 1969-1970 constitutional convention, Reum served as vice-chair of the Legislative Committee, which prepared the legislative article of the 1970 Illinois Constitution. Reum was one of three women appointed to vice-chairmanships by convention president Samuel W. Witwer, who did not appoint any women to chairmanships.

The Legislative Committee faced a number of hot topics. The 1964 Supreme Court decision in Reynolds v. Sims meant that the state's system of reapportionment had to be revised to comply with the principle of one person, one vote. Reum advocated for a system that would eliminate the tiebreak clause imposed under the 1954 reapportionment amendment, in which a failure to pass reapportionment legislation on schedule would lead to the entire state legislature being elected at large statewide (as it did in 1964, which became known as the "bedsheet ballot" election). Reum argued that a party expecting a majority in the upcoming election would have an incentive to obstruct reapportionment so that they could win the largest possible number of seats. The committee and the convention adopted the new system that Reum had advocated for. When the article was reported out to the convention, Reum spoke against an amendment brought by Odas Nicholson that deleted a prohibition on district lines crossing the Chicago city boundary, describing concerns of suburban votes being diluted by Chicago, but the amendment passed.

The Legislative Committee also faced the issue of whether to retain the state's unusual cumulative voting system, in which representatives were elected by cumulative voting within each legislative district. Reum spoke in favor of cumulative voting, arguing that it achieved minority representation, proportional representation, and stable leadership, but she was unable to carry the day either in the committee or, at first, in the convention as a whole. On the night of August 28th, however, she was able to put together a coalition to first suspend the rules and then brought a motion that would put cumulative voting before the voters as a separate question. The motion passed with 60 votes, one more than required.

Reum was later credited with possibly saving the constitution from defeat at the ballot box by advocating for putting the question of whether the replace the existing multi-member legislative districts with smaller single-member districts before the voters as a separate question from the constitution as a whole. After the voters rejected the idea of single-member House districts, the Chicago Daily News wrote that Reum had "saved the Illinois constitutional convention from submitting a constitution that would have met certain defeat at the polls."

In 1972, Reum ran as the Republican candidate for Cook County Recorder of Deeds. She converted a house trailer into an imitation railroad car with an observation platform, bearing the slogan "The Little Train That Could". She traveled around the county on what she described as a "whistle-stop tour", and pledged to have a "one-track mind" in eliminating patronage hiring from the recorder's office. In the general election in November 1972, she won the suburbs by a wide margin but lost the city by an even wider margin, and was defeated by the Democratic incumbent, 50.6% to 49.4%.

== Horse racing ==
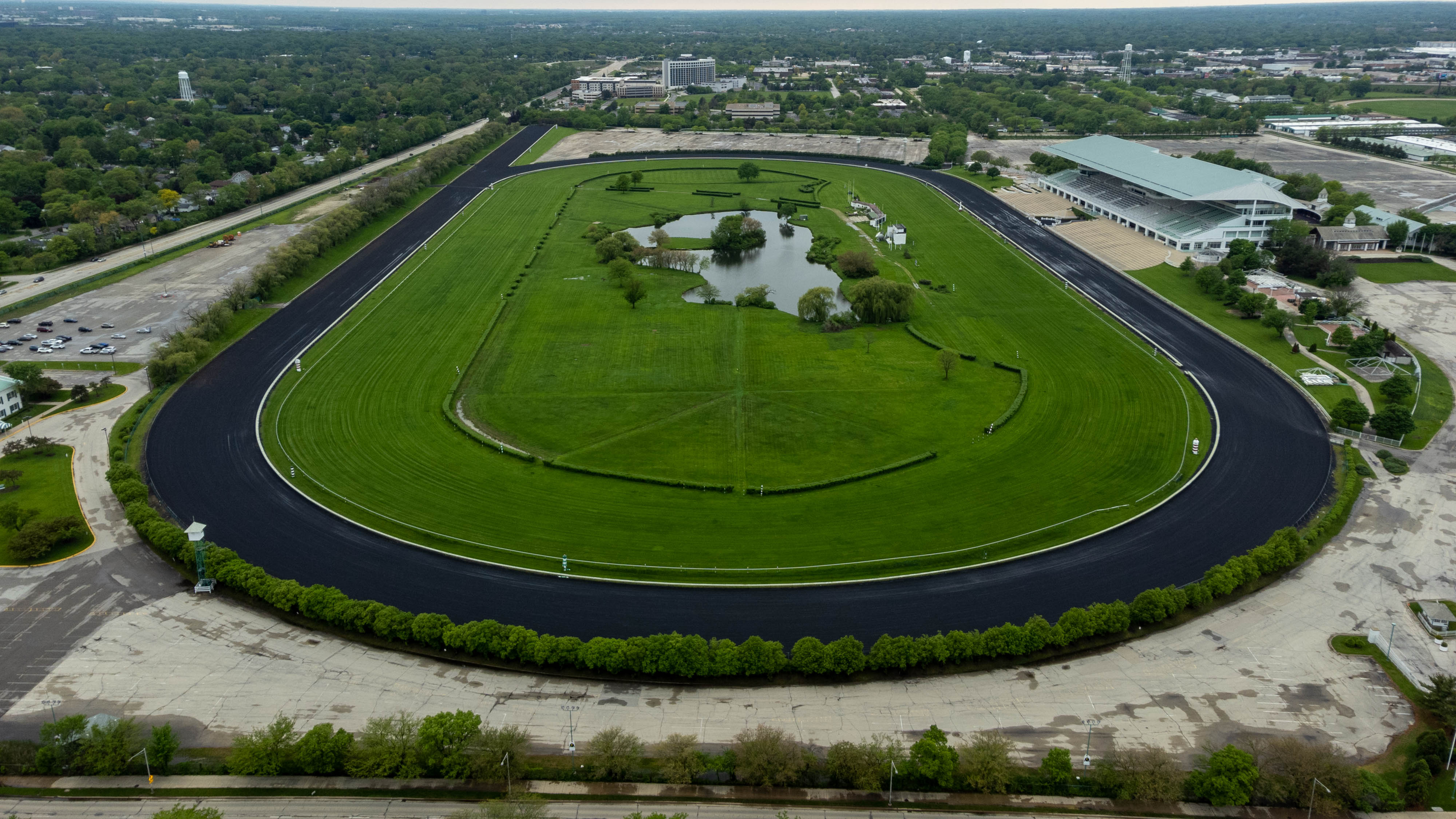
The Arlington racecourse, one of several where Reum's investigations spurred improvements to the backstretch.

In December 1972, Democratic Governor Dan Walker appointed Reum to the Illinois Racing Board. By statute, the governor appointed the seven board members but was required to appoint three from the opposing party. She was one of the first two women appointed to the board. Having no background in the industry, she spent days devouring every book on the subject of horse racing at the Oak Park Public Library. From the outset she focused on improving conditions for workers on the backstretch of the racing tracks. In 1976 Republican Governor James R. Thompson reappointed her and made her chair, replacing Anthony Scariano. She was the first woman to chair the Racing Board.

Reum chaired the committee of the National Fire Protection Association that developed standard NFPA 150, which for the first time provided a standard for fire prevention at racetracks. The committee's formation in 1976 was spurred by several fatal fires in 1975, and the standard was published in 1979. At first Illinois was the only state to adopt it. Originally titled the "Standard on Firesafety in Racetrack Stables", in subsequent years the standard has been broadened to cover all types of animal housing facilities. Even after resigning from the Illinois Racing Board, Reum continued to lead the standards committee as the representative of the National Association of State Racing Commissioners.

In her time as chair Reum faced accusations of racism and improper practices connected with the selection of racing dates. She stepped down from the Racing Board abruptly at a planned special meeting between the racing board and the Illinois Legislative Black Caucus over concerns that the board was sabotaging affirmative action efforts. Stating that the job was "no longer enjoyable", she tendered her immediate resignation. The governor subsequently tried to get her to reconsider but was unsuccessful.

Following her resignation, many members of the caucus spoke diplomatically about their concerns. Representative Charlie Gaines, however, stated that the resignation was "good riddance to bad rubbish", stating that when Reum's husband was in the legislature "he was a racist just like her." Senator Charles Chew likewise stated that he had come there "to tell Lucy Reum she was just like her husband ... she's a racist."

In 1979 Reum founded the Racing Industry Charitable Foundation (RICF), which among other things provides health care to backstretch workers. In 1998, the RICF awarded her the "Governor's Award" and stated that she had "constructively contributed more than anyone to the racing industry in the past 50 years."

== Death and legacy ==
Reum died on July 18, 2005, in Oak Park.

Lucy Reum's grandchildren include Carter Reum and Courtney Reum.
