= Reum =

Reum is a surname. Notable people with the surname include:

- Carter Reum (born 1981), American entrepreneur
- Courtney Reum, American entrepreneur
- Dianne Reum, comics creator
- Walter J. Reum (1914–1999), American lawyer, politician, and writer

== See also ==
- Reem (given name)
