= Shakman =

Shakman is a surname. Notable people with the surname include:

- Elizabeth Shakman Hurd (born 1970), American professor of political science
- Matt Shakman, American director and child actor

== Other uses ==
- Shakman v. Democratic Organization of Cook County, a U.S. court case
  - Shakman Decrees, a series of federal court orders about government employment in Chicago arising from the Shakman decision.
