= Botterman =

Botterman is a surname. Notable people with the surname include:

- Gregg Botterman (born 1968), English rugby union player
- Hannah Botterman (born 1999), English rugby union player
- Kylee Botterman (born 1989), American artistic gymnast
- Patrick Botterman (1964–2008), Harper College trustee and Wheeling Township Committeeman
