= Gloria Pughsley =

Chicago activist and constitutional convention delegate (1916–1997)

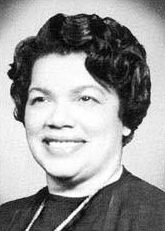
- Photograph of Pughsley published in Illinois Blue Book.

Delegate to Sixth Illinois Constitutional Convention
- In office 1969–1970

Personal details
- Born: January 20, 1916 Gonzales County, Texas
- Died: September 21, 1997 (aged 81) Bexar County, Texas
- Party: Democratic Party
- Education: Prairie View University

Gloria Stockton Pughsley (January 20, 1916 – September 21, 1997) was a community activist in the North Lawndale neighborhood of Chicago. She was one of the only African American women to serve among the 116 delegates to the Sixth Illinois Constitutional Convention, which authored Illinois' first constitution for 100 years. Before the convention, she founded and for 15 years led the Greater Lawndale Association of Block Clubs, a powerful organization of more than 100 block clubs that effectively blocked many urban renewal efforts in the neighborhood.

== Early life and education ==
Pughsley was born in Gonzales County, Texas on January 20, 1916. She attended the public schools of San Antonio, Texas and then Prairie View University. She married army major James Pughsley and traveled with him to Europe in 1946.

== Organizer ==
Pughsley organized the Greater Lawndale Association of Block Clubs in 1955 and served as its president for 15 years. The association was made up of 125 individual block clubs, each of which had a designated key leader.

Among the organization's campaigns was against the taverns that were very numerous in the area. Pughsley claimed that the taverns had increased greatly in number during the 1970s. In 1956 the association sponsored three precinct-level local option referendums to ban taverns within the precinct. It lost two out of three. The referendum passed in the 37th precinct 148 to 71, but was struck down by judge Otto Kerner, who found that eleven of the signatures on the referendum petition were unlawful. After these defeats, in January 1957 the association promised a "constant battle of harassment" to ensure that all laws governing taverns were enforced.

In February 1957, the course of monitoring one tavern to see if their complaint of illegal gambling had been effective, Pughsley and another GLABC member were arrested on charges of disorderly conduct. The charges were subsequently dismissed and the arresting officer was charged with misconduct. Pughsley and her colleague brought suit for civil rights violations, which the city settled for $500 immediately before trial.

Pughsley also served for a time as vice president of the Greater Lawndale Conservation Commission (GLCC). In 1957, she joined with other organizations in calling for the Lawndale area to be designated for "conservation" as part of urban renewal, and urged assistance "in financing and enforcing the building code and other compliance with city ordinances". She also led the GLCC's block club program. However, the GLCC found her to be, in the words of historian Amanda Seligman, "frustratingly independent". She ultimately left the urban renewal-focused GLCC, accusing it of "keeping the Negro begging" in order to maintain control over the neighborhood's Black population. Her advocacy succeeded in blocking the GLCC's efforts to get local residents in Lawndale to cooperate with its campaign.

Pughsley was employed by the City of Chicago under mayor Richard M. Daley as a coordinator for the Mayor's Committee for a Cleaner Chicago. A Chicago Tribune investigation in 1974 accused the committee, including Pughsley, of simply putting on photo opportunities.

Pughsley also served on a committee to discuss renaming Crane College (now Malcolm X College) in 1969. She was one of four trustees, all appointed by the central authority of the City Colleges of Chicago, who were reported as opposing the name change in 1969. The report was disputed.

== Delegate ==
In 1969, Pughsley ran for election as a delegate from the 21st legislative district to the Sixth Illinois Constitutional Convention. Before the convention, Pughsley had only visited the state capitol once.

Pughsley came into the election with strong recognition in North Lawndale thanks to her organizing work. Of the three candidates in the officially nonpartisan election, she and Frank Stemberk were endorsed by the Cook County Democratic Party. Pughsley favored judicial election, lowering the voting age to 18, eliminating sales tax on food and medicine, and eliminating the personal property tax.

In the general election held on November 18, 1969, Pughsley received 14,674 votes to Frank Stemberk's 15,825 and independent Joseph Policky's 3,306. Pughsley and Stemberk thus became the delegates from the 21st district. Pughsley was one of only two delegates who were African American women.

Convention chairman Samuel W. Witwer assigned Pughsley to the convention's Education Committee. She commuted to Springfield for the convention deliberations and continued working at her city job on the weekends. In March 1970, Pughsley was briefly hospitalized, which left the committee deadlocked 5–5 over a choice of wording. As a result of her illness, Pughsley ended up with 18 excused absences, more than a quarter of the total number of excused absences among all 116 delegates through the month of April.

Press accounts described Pughsley as "soft-spoken" and "one of the warmest and most engaging personalities of the convention". She said that she had run because she was "interested in the problems of my community – the ghetto", and that she wanted "total quality education to be a basic law". A May 1970 writeup in the Chicago Tribune described Pughsley as a "quiet woman" who had recently scandalized the convention by "lashing out 'lawyers who cheat people in the ghetto'".

In a floor vote on whether to establish the new Judicial Inquiry Board, Pughsley joined 25 other "organization Democrats" and three downstate delegates in opposing the new system, which nonetheless was adopted by a vote of 73 to 29. On another hot-button topic, Pughsley voted in favor of abolishing capital punishment in Illinois, but this measure also failed by 54 to 50.

Pughsley died in Bexar County, Texas on September 21, 1997.
