= Thomas Gahan =

American politician and business executive

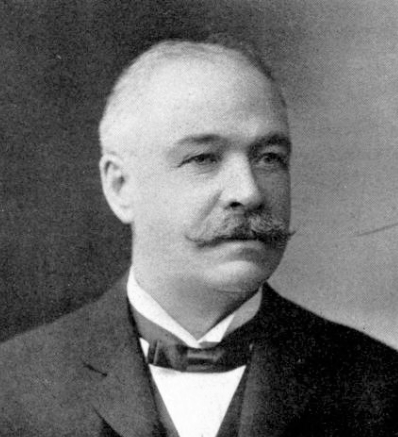
- Born: April 7, 1847; Arlington Heights, Illinois
- Died: April 30, 1905 (aged 58); Chicago, Illinois
- Burial place: Calvary Cemetery
- Occupations: Businessman, politician
- Political party: Democratic
- Spouse: Sarah A. McNarney (m. 1877)
- Children: 4

Thomas Gahan (April 7, 1847 – April 30, 1905) was an American politician and business executive in Chicago.

== Biography ==
For over 25 years, Gahan was a leader of the Cook County Democratic Party and for eight years represented Illinois on the Democratic National Committee.

Gahan also served as president of the Ogden Gas Company.

== Personal ==
Gahan was born in Arlington Heights, Illinois on April 7, 1847.

Gahan was a member of the Sheridan Club, Cook County Club, Ellerslee Cross Country Club, Iroquois club, and the Knights of Columbus.

Gahan was married November 8, 1877 to Miss Sarah A. McNarney. Their children were daughters, Sarah, Olive, Agnes and Rose.

== Political ==
Gahan's first public position was that of police captain of police in what was then Lake, Illinois. Some commentators noted that Gahan maintained civil order there during the great strike of 1884. He then served several terms as town supervisor in Lake.

Gahan's role as a Democratic Party power broker began with his successful campaign to elect Julius S. Grinnell as Illinois Attorney General. When the city of Chicago annexed Lake, Gahan was elected as its alderman.

Gahan served on the Chicago City Council from 1889 to 1893. During this period, Gahan was instrumental in the nomination and election of Peter Altgeld as governor of Illinois. Altgeld then appoint Gahan as the state railroad and warehouse commissioner.

In 1896 Gahan was elected to the Democratic National Committee for Illinois. He was re-elected in 1900 and 1904, but bad health prevented him from serving the third term. Gahan also served as chairman of the Cook County Democratic Party from 1895 to 1902. He was elected as a delegate to each Democratic National Convention from 1884 to 1904. Gahan was also instrumental in the election of John Patrick Hopkins as mayor of Chicago.

Gahan played a significant role in national politics, participating in every presidential campaign from Grover Cleveland-James Blaine in 1884 to the William McKinley- William Jennings Bryan campaign in 1900.

== Business ==
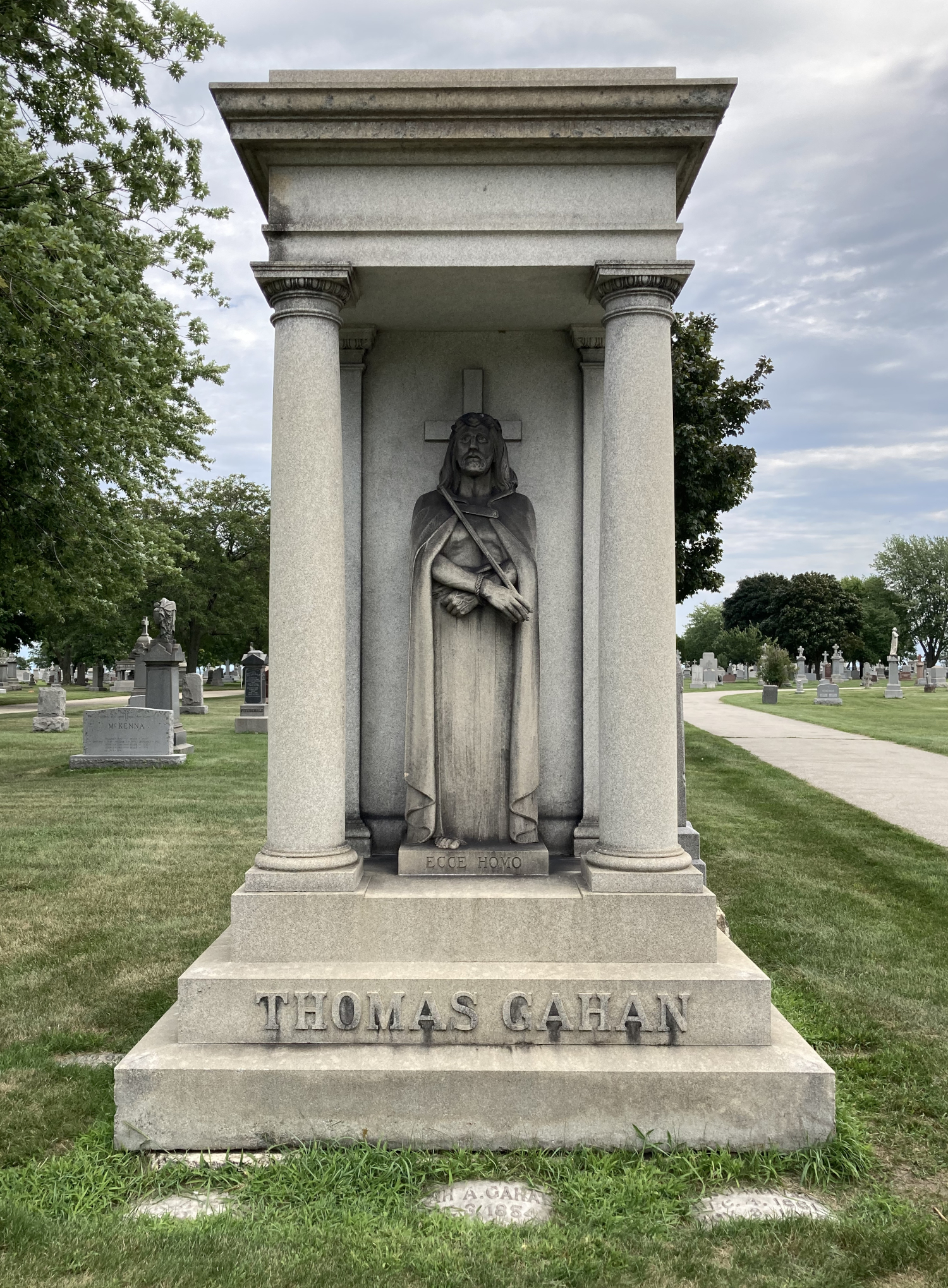
Gahan's grave at Calvary Cemetery

Gahan was associated with Thomas Byrne for many years in general contracting business. The company built three sections of the drainage canal, the Robey Street sewer and all the underground work at the World's Columbian Exposition in 1893.

== Death ==
During his last two years, Gahan suffered from nephritis. On April 29, 1905, he experienced an acute attack, dying the next day at his residence in Chicago. He was buried at Calvary Cemetery in Evanston.
