= Political history of Chicago =

Politics in Chicago through most of the 20th century was dominated by the Democratic Party. Organized crime and political corruption were persistent concerns in the city. Chicago was the political base for presidential nominees Stephen Douglas (1860), Adlai Stevenson II (1952 and 1956), and Barack Obama, who was nominated and elected in 2008.

== History ==
=== 19th century ===
Chicago's rapid growth necessitated the development of infrastructure such as streets, bridges, schools, sanitation, and water systems. The city's strategic location made it a hub for commerce and industry, attracting investments from both local and external sources. Its position on Lake Michigan gave it cheap water access to the East. The arrival of the railroad systems in the 1850s and 1860s made Chicago the crossroads of the entire Midwest, the richest farm region in the world. The assets attracted large numbers of Europeans immigrants, and a smaller number of upscale Yankee arrivals from the northeastern states. Yankee political culture largely dominated the city's political culture before 1900. It stressed civic responsibility and promoted grass roots organizations that opposed the expansion of slavery into Chicago's western hinterland, block corrupt use of municipal spending, establish a nonpartisan and efficient civil service, and build a world-class educational system from public schools up through universities and graduate schools to cultivate the necessary talent. Yankees exhibited a Puritan tone that demanded temperance and viewed Catholicism as the enemy of Yankee values. This sparked working-class and ethnically driven political resistance that the Yankees' massive financial and cultural resources could not suppress.

Most of the population growth came from immigration from Europe. The Germans and Irish came in large numbers, followed later by, by Eastern Europeans. They clustered in ethnic neighborhoods. Catholics built their own schools and colleges, and there were political, religious and cultural tensions. In 1855, Chicago Mayor Levi Boone threw politics into turmoil with dry proposals to control saloons. This led to the Lager Beer Riot by the wets. The Irish Catholics soon played a central role in the Democratic Party. Chicago's Germans split their vote between the parties. The Yankees, British and Scandinavians were largely Republican. Class divisions pitted business-oriented elites with the working-class immigrants over issues of union membership and worker rights. By the 1890s political machines on the ward level routinely provided jobs and contracts. Some German and British immigrants brought radical political ideologies, including socialism and anarchism. The result was violent suppression in the 1880s and 1890s, most notably the Haymarket affair in 1886 and the Pullman Strike of 1894.

=== 20th century ===
The Republicans had their own machine operations, typified by the "blonde boss" William Lorimer, who was unseated by the U.S. Senate in 1912 because of his corrupt election methods. Even more notorious was Big Bill Thompson, the Republican mayor who collaborated with organized crime, protected speakeasies, and dominated politics in the 1920s.

Before the 1930s, the Democratic Party in Chicago was divided along ethnic lines - the Irish, Polish, Italian, and other groups each controlled politics in their neighborhoods. Under the leadership of Anton Cermak, the party consolidated its ethnic bases into one large organization. With the organization united, Cermak was able to win election as mayor of Chicago in 1931, an office he held until his assassination in 1933.

The New Deal of the 1930s and the Great Society of the 1960s gave the Democratic Party access to new funds and programs for housing, slum clearance, urban renewal, and education, through which to dispense patronage and maintain control of the city.

Machine politics persisted in Chicago after the decline of similar machines in other large American cities. The modern era of politics was dominated by the Cook County Democratic Party and was honed by Richard J. Daley after his election in 1955. Local columnist Mike Royko wrote satirically that Chicago's motto (Urbs in Horto or "City in a Garden") should instead be Ubi est mea, or "Where's Mine?"

Harold Washington became Chicago's first African American mayor, serving from 1983, until his untimely death in 1987.

Richard M. Daley, son of Mayor Daley, became mayor and served from 1989 to 2011. Daley was succeeded by former Obama White House Chief of Staff Rahm Emanuel. During much of that time, the Democratic machine found opposition mainly from a liberal "independent" faction of the Democratic Party. This included African Americans and Latinos. In the Lakeview/Uptown 46th Ward, the first Latino to announce an aldermanic bid against a Daley loyalist was Jose Cha Cha Jimenez, founder of the Young Lords.

== Corruption ==
Chicago has a long history of political corruption, dating to the incorporation of the city in 1833. It has been a de facto monolithic entity of the Democratic Party from the mid-20th century onward. In the 1980s, the Operation Greylord investigation resulted in the indictments of 93 public officials, including 17 judges. Research released by the University of Illinois at Chicago reports that Chicago and Cook County's judicial district recorded 45 public corruption convictions for 2013, and 1,642 convictions since 1976, when the Department of Justice began compiling statistics. This prompted many media outlets to declare Chicago the "corruption capital of America". Gradel and Simpson's Corrupt Illinois (2015) provides the data behind Chicago's corrupt political culture. They found that a tabulation of federal public corruption convictions make Chicago "undoubtedly the most corrupt city in our nation", with the cost of corruption "at least" $500 million per year.

== See also ==
- Chicago Traction Wars
- Council Wars
- Government of Chicago
- History of Chicago
  - History of education in Chicago
- History of Illinois
- Lakefront liberals
- Mayor of Chicago, for complete list
  - Mayoral elections in Chicago
