= Victor A. Arrigo =

American lawyer and politician

- Born: January 25, 1908; Italy
- Died: October 13, 1973 (aged 65)
- Occupations: American lawyer and Politician

Victor A. Arrigo (January 25, 1908 – October 13, 1973) was an American lawyer and politician.

Arrigo was born in Termini Imerese, Sicily, Italy. His parents, who were United States citizens, were visiting their family in Sicily. Arrigo and his family lived on the Near North Side, in Chicago. He went to Our Lady of Pompeii Elementary School and McKinley High School. Arrigo went to Crane College and received his law degree from DePaul University College of Law. He practiced law in Chicago. Arrigo served in the United States Army during World War II. Arrigo served in the Illinois Constitutional Convention of 1969-1970 and was a Democrat. Arrigo also served in the Illinois House of Representatives from 1967 until he died in 1973. Arrigo died at St. Luke's Hospital, in Chicago, Illinois, from a lung ailment.

.
