= Joseph L. Gill =

American politician

Joseph L. Gill (April 17, 1885 – January 13, 1972) was an American Democratic Party politician from Chicago, Illinois.

From Lakeview, Chicago, Gill went to business school and was in the insurance business. He served as Chairman of the Cook County Democratic Party from 1950 to 1953 following Jacob Arvey and prior to Richard J. Daley and as 46th Ward Democratic Committeeman for more than 60 years. Gill served in many offices including State Representative, from 1927 to 1931, Clerk of the Municipal Court from 1931 to 1960, and the Chicago Park District Board of Commissioners from 1960 until his death.
