= Violette Neatley Anderson =

American lawyer (1882–1937)

- Born: July 16, 1882; London, England
- Died: December 24, 1937 (aged 55); Chicago, Illinois, U.S.
- Education: Chicago Law School
- Occupation: Lawyer
- Known for: First female African-American law school graduate in the state of Illinois; First African-American woman to practice law at the United States Supreme Court
- Notable work: Bankhead-Jones Act of 1935

Violette Neatley Anderson (July 16, 1882 – December 24, 1937) became the first African-American woman to practice law before the United States Supreme Court on January 29, 1926. She was one of the most prominent advocates of a landmark piece of legislation that helped secure rights and economic mobility for sharecroppers in the South, the Bankhead-Jones Act.

== Early life and education ==
Violette Neatley Anderson was born in London in 1882 to a German mother and a West Indian father. She moved to Chicago with her family as a small child.

Anderson graduated from North Division High School in 1899 and attended Chicago Athenaeum. Her interest in law began when she worked as a court reporter from 1905 to 1920. She attended Chicago Seminar of Sciences between 1912 and 1915 and went on to receive her LL.B. from Chicago Law School in 1920.

== Married life ==
In 1903, Anderson married her first husband, Albert Johnson, however this marriage ended in divorce. In December 1906, she married her second husband, Dr. Daniel H. Anderson, and took his last name.

== Career ==
Anderson opened her own private practice after graduating. She went on to serve as the first female City Prosecutor for Chicago from 1922 to 1923. On January 29, 1926, she was the first Black woman to be admitted to practice for the Supreme Court of the United States.

She also operated a court reporting agency, as an assistant prosecuting attorney, and became vice-president of the Cook County Bar Association (1920–1926). Additionally, by becoming one of the first Black woman to graduate from law school in Illinois, she also became the first African-American woman admitted to practice by examination by the state board of examiners, the first African-American woman admitted to practice before the Supreme Court, the first woman to engage in her own active law practice in the state of Illinois, the first African-American woman admitted to the United States District Court, Eastern Division of Illinois, the first African-American woman appointed to the position of assistant prosecuting attorney in Chicago, and the first African-American vice-president of the Cook County Bar Association (1920–1926).

=== Bankhead–Jones Farm Tenant Act of 1937 ===
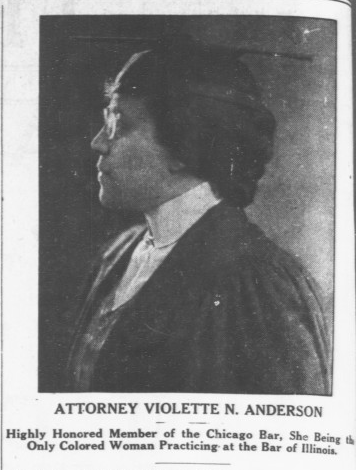
Violette Anderson in The Broad Ax newspaper (July 29, 1922)

Violette Neatley Anderson was an instrumental force in testifying in favor of The Bankhead-Jones Act. Additionally, Anderson was an active force in lobbying the US Congress for support of the Bankhead-Jones Act in 1936. This Act aimed to provide sharecroppers and tenant farmers with low-interest loans to buy small farms, and was designed to transform poor agriculturalists farm workers to farm owners. This Act was eventually signed into law in 1937 by President Franklin D. Roosevelt.

== Group membership ==
Anderson was a member of the Federal Colored Women's Clubs and the League of Women Voters. She served as president of Friendly Big Sisters League of Chicago, the first vice-president of Cook County Bar Association, and secretary of the Idlewild Lot Owners Association. She also served as an executive board member of the Chicago Council of Social Agencies.

=== Zeta Phi Beta ===
She is known for her work with the sorority Zeta Phi Beta. Before becoming the 8th Grand Basileus, she was a member. Before she died, she donated her summer home in Idlewild to the sorority. The organization recognizes her every year in the month of April on "Violette Anderson Day".

As National President, Violette Anderson asked Lambda Zeta chapter in 1937 to host an upcoming national convention in Houston, Texas. No other black Greek-lettered organization (one of the Divine nine) had ever held a national convention south of the Mason-Dixon line. This was a notable success, acknowledging the fact that the meeting was held in the black business sector of downtown Houston. Meals had to be provided by the YWCA cafeteria, as there were no restaurants available to blacks in downtown Houston. She also helped house various delegates, members, and friends during the conference.
