= Ida Platt =

African-American Lawyer (1863 – 1939)

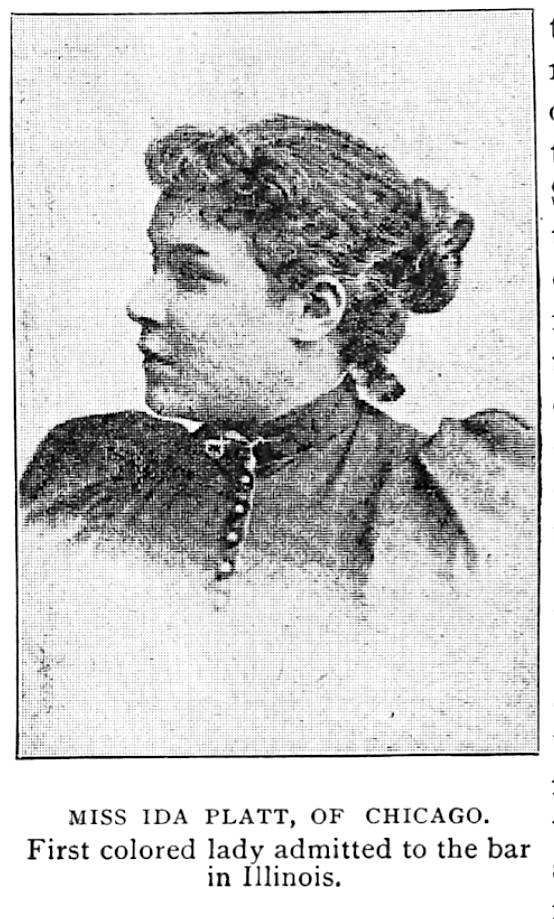
- Ida Platt, in a 1903 publication.
- Born: September 29, 1863; Chicago, Illinois, U.S.
- Died: December 10, 1939 (aged 76)
- Occupation: American lawyer

Ida Platt (September 29, 1863 – 1939) was an African-American lawyer, based in Chicago. In 1894, she became the first African-American woman licensed to practice law in Illinois, and the third in the United States.

== Early life ==
Ida Platt was born in Chicago, Illinois, the daughter of Jacob F. and Amelia B. Platt. Her father owned a lumber business. She worked as a stenographer and secretary to pay her way at law school, and learned German and French in her work. She also studied piano as a young woman.

Platt was the first African-American woman to graduate from Chicago-Kent College of Law when she finished in 1894.

== Career ==
Ida Platt was admitted to the Illinois bar in 1894, becoming the first African-American woman lawyer in that state, and the third in the United States. She worked in the Chicago office of Joseph Washington Errant, practicing probate and real estate law. In 1896 she spoke at the national convention of the Colored Women's League in New York City, on "Woman in the Profession of Law". She opened her own law office downtown in 1911. She was a member of the Cook County Bar Association.

== Personal life ==
Ida Platt's cousin Richard Theodore Greener was the first African-American graduate of Harvard College, dean of Howard University's School of Law, and a diplomat in Siberia; his daughter Belle da Costa Greene was a prominent librarian.

Platt married in 1923, at age 61, and moved to England. She died there on December 10th, 1939, aged 76 years. Today there is public housing for seniors in Chicago named the Ida Platt Apartments in her memory.

== See also ==
- List of first women lawyers and judges in Illinois
