= Walter J. Reum =

American lawyer, politician, and writer

Walter John Reum (July 7, 1914–April 7, 1999) was an American lawyer, politician, and writer.

Reum was born in Chicago, Illinois. He went to the Austin Community Academy High School, University of Illinois, and Chicago-Kent College of Law. Reum was admitted to the Illinois bar in 1938 and practiced law in Chicago. In 1939 he married Lucy Reum. He lived in Oak Park, Illinois with his wife and family. He served in the Illinois House of Representatives from 1953 to 1963 and was a Republican. Reum also wrote plays and poems. Reum died in Oak Park, Illinois from cancer.
