= Patrick Botterman =

American politician (1964–2008)

Patrick Botterman (1964-2008) was an elected Harper College trustee and Wheeling Township Committeeman of the Cook County Democratic Party. He also managed campaigns for Democratic candidates. He lived in Arlington Heights.
