= Cook County Bar Association =

African-American professional organization (founded 1914)

The Cook County Bar Association (CCBA), the nation's oldest association of African-American lawyers and judges, was founded in Illinois in 1914. Arkansas attorney Lloyd G. Wheeler, moved to Illinois in 1869 to practice law and he, along with 31 other Black lawyers, began to meet informally to plan protests against discrimination in hotels, theaters, and restaurants, and to address judicial elections and school desegregation. Among the group of Black lawyers was Ida Platt, the first Black woman admitted to practice in the State of Illinois, and the third Black woman lawyer in the nation. This informal collaboration lasted until 1914, when a younger generation of lawyers decided to form the Cook County Bar Association. Edward H. Wright was elected the first CCBA president. On March 5, 1920, the CCBA was formally incorporated by the State of Illinois.

In 1925, CCBA members C. Francis Stradford, Wendell E. Green, and Jesse N. Baker were among the founders of the National Bar Association (NBA).

The CCBA engaged in a variety of legal programs to advance the legal profession and its members and developed an organized system for the fair and impartial evaluations of judicial candidates which led to the joint alliance with other minority bar associations.

== Background ==
The Cook County Bar Association was formed during the "Great Migration". Black people left the farms and rural areas of the American South to join the military forces of World War I, and to respond to the labor demands of a wartime economy. Between 1916 and 1919, more than 50,000 migrants came to Chicago, Illinois. The migration greatly expanded the market for businesses, created demand for housing, and laid the foundation for increased political muscle.

Retail shopkeepers formed the Colored Commercial Club of Chicago to promote common interests of members with the use of joint advertising, mutual account adjusting, cooperative business loans, and legal advice. The Chicago Whip newspaper was founded in 1919 by businessman, William C. Linton, and recent Yale Law School graduates, Joseph D. Bibb and Arthur C. MacNeal. The Whip advocated racial militancy and economic radicalism. Civic leaders and journalists expressed mounting concern about the inadequacy of housing as the migration increased population in some areas. The housing shortage became a major issue in 1917 as blacks moved in increasing numbers into Kenwood, Hyde Park, Woodlawn, Grand Boulevard, Englewood and areas west, and the white population had limited choices of areas to which they could move, because the war had halted home construction and housing was scarce. Whites responded by attempting to tighten the color bar in housing, schools, and public accommodations. Some whites resorted to terrorism and organized guerilla warfare. White "athletic clubs" assaulted blacks on the streets; neighborhood improvement societies bombed black-owned homes. By 1919, blacks were being assaulted on the streets daily. When blacks fought back, the result were the July 1919 riots. The riots lasted 13 days, left 38 people dead, 537 injured, and 1000 black families without homes.

A core of black politicians, among whom were CCBA members Edward Wright, Oscar DePriest, and Robert R. Jackson planned the creation of a political organization based on the "black belt" geographical boundaries.

In 1910, Wright ran in the primary as a candidate for alderman. In 1912, he ran again, increasing the number of votes. In 1914, he supported William R. Cowen, a real estate businessman, who cornered 45% of the vote. The leadership group of the Republican Party then realized that they had to consider black aspirations when slating candidates in the 2nd ward. In 1915, the Republican Party nominated Oscar DePriest for alderman. DePriest won election as alderman of the 2nd ward. Robert R. Jackson was elected to represent the senatorial district in the General Assembly.

Historian Christopher Robert Reed described this period as a "metamorphosis" of the black population from being a "barely discernible presence" into a dynamic, revolutionary change. An important component of this change was the rising racial consciousness that affected and unified all classes of black society. It was a level of racial solidarity that bonded the community's thinking and manifested itself in the formation of the Black Metropolis. Reed noted that the 1919–20 edition of Black's Blue Book listed 1,200 black-owned businesses which included five banks, 48 real estate offices, 106 physicians, 40 dentists, 70 lawyers, three insurance companies, six hotels, and 11 newspapers.

The Cook County Bar Association was home to a number of first Black women in law. The third woman allowed to practice law in the United States, Ida Platt, and Violette Neatley Anderson, the first Black woman to testify before the Supreme Court were both involved in the Cook County Bar Association. Ida Platt was a founding member, and Violette Neatley Anderson served as a vice president from 1920 to 1926.

== Presidents and leaders ==
1. 1914–18: Edward H. Wright was the first president and one of the founders of the association. He was admitted to the Illinois bar in 1896, and elected a county commissioner in 1896. He was the first black to hold a position in the office of Secretary of State; first black to serve as special attorney for the City of Chicago; first black appointed to the Illinois Commerce Commission. First black elected 2nd ward committeeman, replacing Cong. Martin Madden.
2. 1919: Henry M. Porter, an assistant state's attorney served a one-year term as president. Porter, a migrant from Augusta, Ga., officed at 720 West 12st Street, and was an incorporator of the Bar. A few months after his term as president began, the 1919 riots broke out. For a week, sporadic acts of violence flared in black and white areas of the south side. 19 The State's Attorney and the Judges of the Criminal Court requested the CCBA to appoint some of its members to appear and defend blacks charged with crimes during the riot. The CCBA members selected to appear on behalf of the charged succeeded in gaining acquittals for many innocent blacks, and also collected damages in civil actions for injury to persons and property. In 1921, Porter was assigned to the Harrison Street Police Court. Porter was slated as a candidate for judge of the Municipal Court, but he did not win election.
3. 1920: James A. Terry, an assistant state's attorney, served a one-year term. During his term as CCBA President, Terry forged relationships with bar associations in the Seventh Judicial District, attended joint meetings and conferred on issues of common interest. Other officers were: James G. Cotter, 1st Vice President; M. L. Barclay, 2nd Vice President; William Baker, 3rd Vice President; William L. Offord, Secretary; O. A. Clark, Treasurer
4. 1920–1926: Violette Neatley Anderson was vice president from 1920 to 1926. During her time as vice president she successfully defended a woman who was accused of murdering her husband. As a result of her success, Anderson was appointed to serve as assistant prosecutor in Chicago. Anderson was the first woman and the first African-American appointed to the post.
5. 1921–22: Richard E. Westbrooks, a 1910 graduate of John Marshall Law School, was a founder of the association. He was counsel to the Chicago Defender, and a renowned trial lawyer. During the investigation of the 1919 riots, Westbrooks was appointed a special assistant state's attorney to assist in collecting of evidence against persons charged with assault and murder of colored citizens, and destruction of property. In 1922, he was appointed resident counsel for Liberia; appraiser in the inheritance tax division of Cook County; and appointed assistant state's attorney for the habeas corpus department of the state's attorney's office.
6. 1923: Willis E. Mollison, a journalist, orator, and a private practitioner, was a migrant from Vicksburg, Miss. He attended Fisk University and Oberlin College, and while studying law in the offices of Judge Jeffords, was elected chancery and circuit court clerk in Mayersville, Mississippi. He edited the Mayersville Spectator, the only newspaper in the county. After moving to Chicago, he practiced law with his son and served on numerous boards, among which were the Universal Forum Society and the Anthropological Society.
7. 1924–25: Champion J. Waring, a senior member of the bar, rallied members of the association to actively support the election of Albert B. George, as the first black jurist to be elected to the Municipal Court. Waring aided and encouraged the launching of the National Bar Association and hosted the 2nd annual meeting in Chicago in 1926. Waring increased the financial members in the association to 63. In a show of confidence by the Chicago Bar Association, their grievance committee sent all grievances involving members of the CCBA to the CCBA Grievance Committee.
8. 1926–27: C. Francis Stradford. During his presidency, the paid membership from 63 to 108. Stradford, a graduate of Oberlin College and Columbia University Law School, was active in Chicago's 2nd ward. After completing his term as CCBS he went on to serve as President of the National Bar Association. The 2nd Annual meeting of the NBA, held in 1926, was held in Chicago. The public meeting held after the convention featured an address given by Edward H. Wright, who was then a member of the Commerce Commission, and 2nd Ward committeeman.
9. 1928–29: A. M. Burroughs. He created a judiciary committee to investigate and recommend candidates for endorsement by the association. Burroughs informed the members of the range of offices and positions held by CCBA members, as follows: Judge of the Municipal Court; six corporation counsels; four state representatives; two city prosecutors; one special attorney general; 13 state's attorneys; one city attorney; one attorney general; one alderman; one assistant to the judge of the court of domestic relations; and one assistant United States attorney. Members in the private sector were general counsel of the Chicago Defender; general counsel and director of the Liberty Life Insurance Company; Binga State Bank; Douglass National Bank; and general counsel of various fraternal organizations and insurance companies. Burroughs completed the furnishing of the permanent headquarters at 4500 S. Michigan and held the annual banquet at the facility. Burroughs presided over the dedication of the law library on September 29, 1928. Burroughs organized a ladies auxiliary to the association, made up of wives of members who assisted in arranging the entertainment for delegates to the National Bar Convention. After the convention, the auxiliary continued to plan receptions and social events at the headquarters. The auxiliary hosted a reception lawn party to honor Cong. Oscar De Priest and his wife. Burroughs increased the number of dues paying members from 108 to 143; and created annual picnics to give the lawyers an opportunity to fraternize. A fellow member hosted the association at his country home in Michigan.
10. 1938339: Earl B. Dickerson.

== 100th anniversary ==
During 2014, the Cook County Bar Association celebrated its 100th anniversary under the theme "Destiny in Time". During the event the organization inducted as President Celestia L. Mays.
