= Shakman v. Democratic Organization of Cook County =

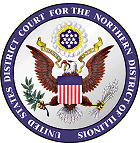
- Court: United States District Court for the Northern District of Illinois
- Full case name: Michael L. Shakman, et al. vs. Democratic Organization of Cook County, et al.
- Docket nos.: 1:69-cv-02145
- Citations: 310 F. Supp. 1398 (N.D. Ill. 1969); reversed, 435 F.2d 267 (7th Cir. 1970); cert. denied, 402 U.S. 909 (1971) 356 F. Supp. 1241 (N.D. Ill. 1972); affirmed, 533 F.2d 344 (7th Cir. 1976); cert. denied, 429 U.S. 858 (1976); 481 F. Supp. 1315 (N.D. Ill. 1979); reversed, Shakman v. Dunne, 829 F.2d 1387 (7th Cir. 1987); 508 F. Supp. 1063 (N.D. Ill. 1981); 508 F. Supp. 1059 (N.D. Ill. 1981); 552 F. Supp. 907 (N.D. Ill. 1982); 569 F. Supp. 177 (N.D. Ill. 1983); 560 F. Supp. 863 (N.D. Ill. 1983); 607 F. Supp. 1086 (N.D. Ill. 1985); 634 F. Supp. 895 (N.D. Ill. 1986); 677 F. Supp. 933 (N.D. Ill. 1987); 844 F. Supp. 422 (N.D. Ill. 1994) 920 F. Supp. 2d 881 (N.D. Ill. 2013)

Court membership
- Judges sitting: Abraham Lincoln Marovitz; Nicholas John Bua; Ann Claire Williams

Shakman v. Democratic Organization of Cook County, No. 1:69-cv-02145, is a case in the United States District Court for the Northern District of Illinois regarding political patronage in the hiring of public officials and First Amendment and Fourteenth Amendment rights. The case resulted in negotiations from 1969-1983 that brought to fruition the Shakman Decrees, largely reducing political corruption in the Chicago government. Parts of the case are still being negotiated to this day.

== Background ==
Chicago politics had long been dominated by political patronage, or the rewarding of supporters through position and the punishment of opponents through demotion or firing. Public employees, therefore had to be careful with political allegiances; campaigning for a loser would result in demotion, firing, or transfer, while neutrality could result in a stagnant career advancement.

Shakman, then an attorney, ran for a public position outside of the Cook County Democratic Party and lost. He was distressed at the level of support the incumbent Democrats received from public employees and was, along with other plaintiffs, shocked to learn that this was often mandatory support required by the politicians as a part of the patronage system for those employees to keep their positions. Shakman argued this was a violation of employee rights, free elections, and use of public funds and was therefore in violation of the first and fourteenth amendments.

Shakman filed a suit against the Democratic Organization of Cook County claiming the patronage system gave unconstitutional and unfair advantage to organized candidates over others, since employees would campaign and support the organized candidates.

== Case ==
Shakman, along with Paul M. Lurie, filed a class action suit claiming the Democratic Organization of Cook County was in violation of the First Amendment and the equal protection clause of the Fourteenth Amendment. Shakman claimed that the defendants, a number of government employees and politicians, had violated the fundamental rights of a fair and equal electoral process and sought declaratory and injunctive relief.

The defendants included:

1. The Democratic County Central Committee of Cook County and its members, including its Chairman, George W. Dunne
2. The City of Chicago
3. George W. Dunne, individually and as President of the Board of Commissioners of Cook County
4. Morgan M. Finley, individually and as Clerk of the Circuit Court of Cook County
5. Thomas M. Tully, Assessor of Cook County
6. Stanley T. Kusper, as Clerk of Cook County
7. Edward J. Rosewell, as Treasurer of Cook County
8. The Forest Preserve District of Cook County

The complaint stemmed from government employees being mandated to campaign or contribute to the political campaigns of Democratic candidates to guarantee their employment in the future. This had been a long-standing practice of Democratic politicians in Chicago who had a majority at the time. Along with being unconstitutional, Shakman claimed that it was a burden on taxpayers since the public funds and work hours allotted to these employees was being requisitioned for campaigns. Ending political patronage, therefore, would be beneficial to the public budget and to taxpayers.

The case was thrown out of court in 1969, but reversed and remanded by the United States Court of Appeals for the Seventh Circuit in 1970, leading to a long deliberation. After the reversal of the case the plaintiffs and much of the defendants were able to enter into a consent decree on most of the pressing issues. The defendants agreed to much of the complaints and resolved to make the necessary changes. Stipulations of fact were filed to resolve the remaining issues.

The court underwent a thorough test of constitutionality of political patronage and considered the interests at stake within the First and Fourteenth Amendments. They considered the right to free association and the right to equal participation in the electoral process. The court also recognized that there was a liability that the defendants had committed a civil conspiracy in the act of political patronage, thus incentivizing them negotiating a deal.

The defendants admitted that they in fact were given a significant electoral advantage from political patronage and were therefore consenting to negotiate some acceptable terms that Shakman et al. could agree to.

=== "Shakman Decrees" ===
After years of negotiations, both parties agree on the three "Shakman Decrees" of 1972, 1979, and 1983 respectively. These decrees enforced the principle that it was unlawful to affect an individual's employment status one way or the other on the grounds of political patronage and allegiances. There were of course some exceptions such as in the case for positions that had political aspects, such as policy making.

=== Termination of the case ===
On July 6, 2023, U.S. District Judge Edmond Chang terminated the remaining court oversight of hiring and promotions in the Cook County's clerk's office, ending the litigation. In explaining the decision, Chang stated that the case had served its purpose and was closed.

== Significance ==
The Shakman case helped to greatly reduce the power of political patronage among the Chicago political system and paved the way to reducing it nationwide. Although it is still likely present in politics, it is certainly practiced to a much lesser extent and much more discreetly. Patronage was generally found to be unconstitutional and contrary to the belief in fair and equal elections, employee rights, and the use of public dollars. The long deliberation resulted in much more free and open politics in regards to public employees, with the aim at reducing political corruption.
