= Cook County Democratic Party =

Political party in Illinois, U.S.

- Chairperson: Toni Preckwinkle
- Headquarters: 134 N LaSalle, Chicago, Ill.
- Ideology: Liberalism; Progressivism; Social liberalism
- National affiliation: Democratic Party
- Regional affiliation: Democratic Party of Illinois
- Chicago City Council: 48 / 50
- Cook County Board of Commissioners: 16 / 17

Website
- cookcountydems.com

The Cook County Democratic Party is an American county-level political party organization which represents voters in 50 wards in the city of Chicago and 30 suburban townships of Cook County. The organization has dominated Chicago politics (and consequently, Illinois politics) since the 1930s. It relies on an organizational structure of a ward or township committeeperson (until 2018 legal name change, "committeeman") to elect candidates. At the height of its influence under Richard J. Daley in the 1960s, in contrast to other American big city political machines which saw decline in political patronage in employment in the wake of the New Deal reforms of the 1930s, it was one of the most powerful political machines in American history. By the 1980s, the party had largely ceased to function as a machine due to the legal dismantling of the patronage system under the Shakman Decrees issued by the federal court in Chicago. The current Chair is Toni Preckwinkle, who is also the elected Cook County Board president.

== Organization and leadership ==
Article I of the by-laws of the Cook County Democratic Party states that the party exists to "attract, endorse, and support qualified Democratic candidates for office, to develop positions on issues of public importance, to advance the ideals and principles of the Democratic Party, and to seek to improve the lives of the people of Cook County through effective, efficient, and fair government." The by-laws also state that the party must "promote Democratic political activity in Cook County and encourage broad and diverse political participation by Cook County Democrats regardless of race, color, creed, national origin, gender, physical ability or sexual orientation ... and take an active role in county, state, and national political efforts which have an impact upon the people of Cook County."

The party was chaired by 31st ward committeeman Joseph Berrios from 2007 until April 2018, when Cook County President Toni Preckwinkle replaced him. The Executive Committee has eight other officers: two Executive Vice-Chairs, First Vice-Chair, City Vice-Chair, Suburban Vice-Chair, Secretary, Treasurer, and Sergeant-At-Arms. Each of the 50 wards of Chicago and the 30 suburban townships has its own committee and is represented in the Central Committee by an elected committeeperson (until 2018 legal name change, "committeeman").

In suburban Cook County, regional groups, such as the Southland Democrats, co-ordinate activities with their local Democratic township organizations and their committeemen. Article IV, Section 4 of the By-laws of the Cook County Democratic Party allows the Suburban Vice-Chair (a position currently held by Illinois State Senator Don Harmon) the authority to "convene caucuses and meetings, solicit support for the organization, assist the County Chair in any matters upon request, coordinate activities concerning recommendations for endorsements of candidate, and bring before the Central Committee issues of particular interest."

=== Committeepeople ===
See also Incumbent Chicago Democratic Party Committeepeople.

== History ==
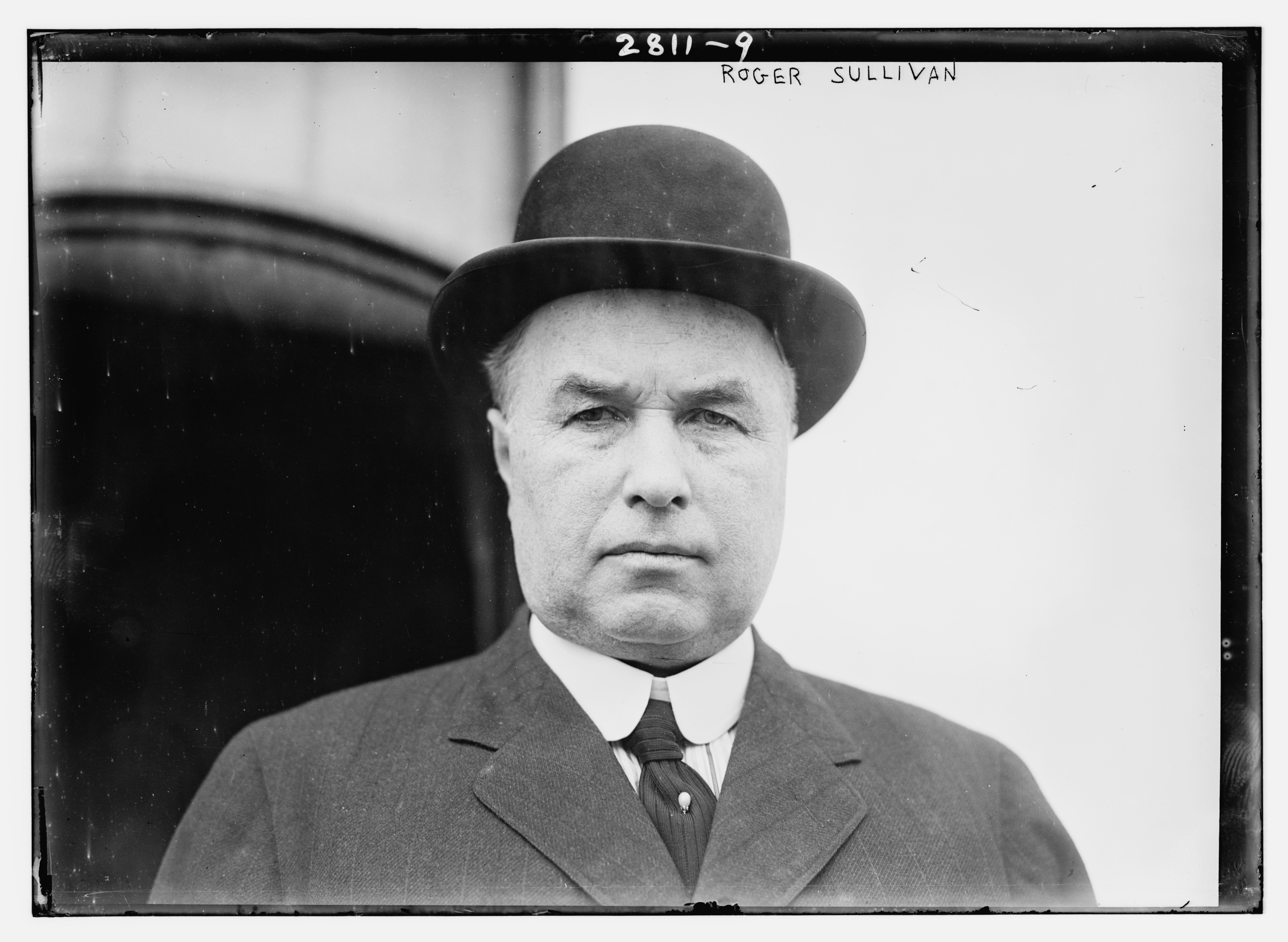
Chairman Roger C. Sullivan, circa 1913

=== Early history ===
Cook County was created on 15 January 1831 and it was named after Daniel Cook. Cook had been one of the earliest and youngest statesmen in Illinois history and he was a registered Democrat in Randolph County. By 1837, local Democrats were winning electoral victories under the leadership of William B. Ogden. Ogden recruited Irish immigrants into the party. Their loyalty to native Democrats was established in return for petty political favors and an occasional elected office. The careers of Irish Democrats from this period, such as John Comiskey from the Blue Island area, were still limited by anti-Irish discrimination. Prior to the American Civil War, the city of Chicago and Cook County had created a strong two-party tradition. The local Democratic Party grew stronger in the decades that followed the Great Chicago Fire due in part to an influx of new immigrants from eastern and southern Europe. By 1890, Roger Charles Sullivan had accumulated major influence within the tumultuous Cook County Democratic Party. He would come to dominate the organization for two decades and he was a national figure during the age when urban political bosses reached the height of their power and prestige. After his death, he was followed as chairman by George Brennan in 1920.

Prior to the death of party chairman George Brennan in 1928, the Democratic Party in Cook County was divided along ethnic lines – the Irish, Polish, Italian, and other groups each controlled politics in their neighborhoods and municipalities. Under the leadership of Anton Cermak, a Czech American, the party combined its ethnic bases into one large organization. With the organization behind him, Cermak was able to win election as mayor of Chicago in 1931, an office he held until his assassination in 1933. After Cermak's death, Patrick Nash and Edward J. Kelly consolidated the Cook County Democratic Party into a political machine.

Nash and Kelly were able to bring African-Americans, who had been predominantly Republicans since the Civil War, into the Democratic Party. Nash died in 1943 and Kelly took over as Chairman of the Cook County Democratic Party. The extensive corruption that took place during Kelly's tenure caused him to become unelectable. Jacob Arvey assumed the position of Chairman of the organization after Kelly's ouster in 1947. Arvey put reformers on the slate, such as Martin H. Kennelly for mayor, Paul Douglas for United States Senate, and Adlai Stevenson for governor of Illinois. During the early years of the 1950s, Joseph L. Gill – George Brennan's brother-in-law – replaced Arvey as Chairman of the party. His role was more of a caretaker than that of a political leader.

=== Under Richard J. Daley ===
The Democratic committeemen of Cook County elected Richard J. Daley as their chairman in 1953 and the Democratic committeemen of Chicago slated him as their mayoral candidate in 1955. He served as chairman for 22 years and as mayor for twenty years. This was accomplished with the help and support of William L. Dawson. In return, an African-American "sub-machine" led by Dawson was created under the umbrella of the regular machine. In the predominantly African-American wards, Dawson was able to act as his own political boss. He amassed a considerable power base by awarding political appointments to his allies, just as Daley did in the larger machine. However, Dawson's machine had to continually support the regular machine in order to retain its own clout.

Presidential Election Results 1960–2020
Year	Democrat	Republican
2020	74.22% 1,725,973	24.01% 558,269
2016	73.93% 1,611,946	20.79% 453,287
2012	73.88% 1,488,537	24.59% 495,542
2008	76.48% 1,582,973	23.05% 477,038
2004	70.25% 1,439,724	29.15% 597,405
2000	68.63% 1,280,547	28.65% 534,542
1996	66.79% 1,153,289	26.73% 461,557
1992	58.21% 1,249,533	28.20% 605,300
1988	55.77% 1,129,973	43.36% 878,582
1984	51.02% 1,112,641	48.40% 1,055,558
1980	51.99% 1,124,584	39.60% 856,574
1976	53.44% 1,180,814	44.69% 987,498
1972	46.01% 1,063,268	53.41% 1,234,307
1968	50.56% 1,181,316	41.11% 960,493
1964	63.18% 1,537,181	36.82% 895,718
1960	56.37% 1,378,343	43.33% 1,059,607

Daley helped turn out the vote for John F. Kennedy in the 1960 presidential election. Kennedy won Illinois by 9,000 votes, yet won Cook County by 450,000 votes, with some Chicago precincts going to Kennedy by over 10 to 1 margins. Illinois' 27 electoral votes helped give Kennedy the majority he needed. Chicago was selected to host the 1968 Democratic National Convention. Political commentator Len O'Connor described this period as Richard J. Daley's "High Water Mark" and described the Cook County Democratic Party at the time as one of the most powerful political machines in American history.

=== Under George Dunne and Edward Vrdolyak ===
The Shakman Decrees introduced judicial oversight of City and County hiring, reducing the number of voters who owed their livelihoods to the Democratic party. The 1968 convention had ended in disaster. The Walker Report concluded that a "police riot" had taken place at the 1968 Democratic National Convention in Chicago. NBC News had televised the event and switched back and forth between demonstrators being beaten by the police in front of the convention hall and the festivities over Humphrey's victory inside. Racial tension over issues such as urban renewal in Woodlawn and Lincoln Park, red lining, open housing and public school desegregation alienated African-Americans and Latinos voters. Though Daley himself never faced any criminal charges, a number of his associates did, including Thomas Keane and Arvey. After Daley's death in 1976, no mayor has served as chairman of the Cook County Democratic Party. Michael Bilandic, Daley's successor as mayor, lost in a 1979 mayoral primary to Jane Byrne. In Bilandic's obituary, The New York Times wrote that the operation of the Cook County Democratic Party as a political machine ended during Bilandic's mayoralty.

Byrne's base of support was on the Northwest side of Chicago, and to a lesser extent the Southeast and Southwest, and she also benefited from independent African-American electoral support. Originally a Richard J. Daley appointee, Byrne did not have the backing of the influential ward committeemen such as John Daley, Michael Madigan, or Thomas Hynes. For a short while after Byrne's election Richard J. Daley's successor as Democratic County Party Chairman George Dunne supported her. In 1979, Oak Park Democratic committeeman and State Senator since 1970, Philip J. Rock became the Illinois State Senate's top Democrat. He would serve as such for the next 14 years and he would retire as the longest serving President of the Senate and Majority Leader in state history.

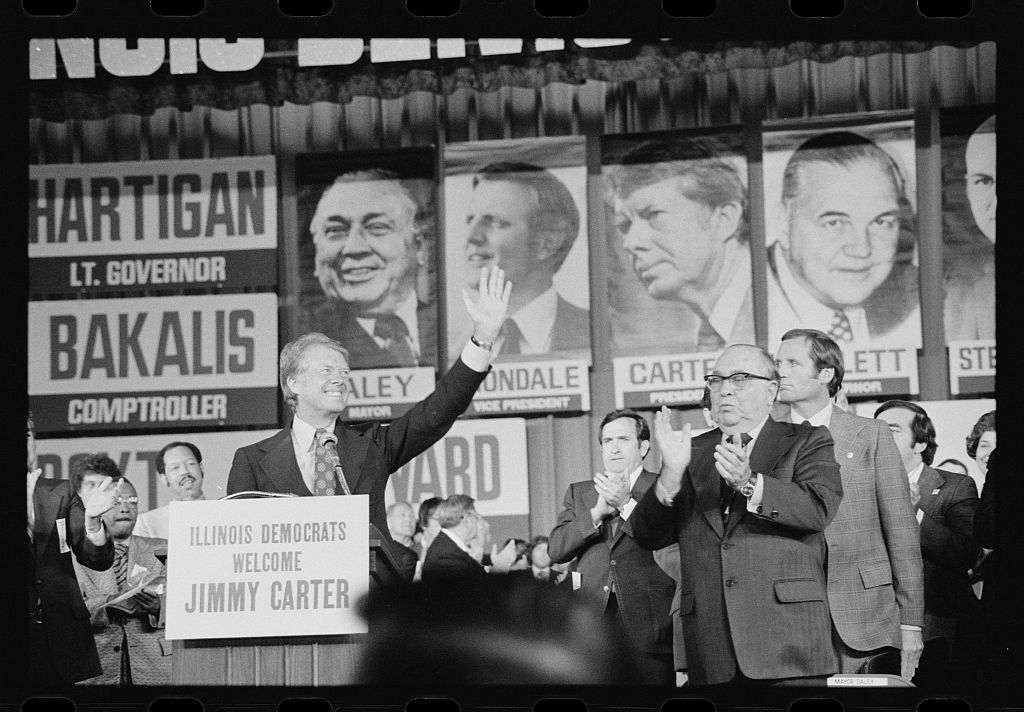
Jimmy Carter and Chairman Richard J. Daley at the 1976 Illinois State Democratic Convention, held in Cook County.

George Dunne had a falling out with the mayor and in 1982 he lost the party chairmanship to 10th Ward committeeman Edward Vrdolyak, an ally of Jane Byrne. When Richard J. Daley's son Richard M. Daley challenged Byrne for mayor in 1983, a coalition of African-American, Hispanic, and "good government" or "lakefront liberals" coalesced. Latinos who had been displaced for years from the downtown and lakefront neighborhoods joined the West Town Coalition and the Young Lords, and both groups backed Harold Washington. He won the three-way primary election with 80% of the Latino vote. The Young Lords leader Jose Cha Cha Jimenez introduced the new mayor in June 1983 in Humboldt Park before a crowd of 100,000 Puerto Ricans. For the next three years, the Cook County Democratic Party was divided by crippling Council Wars in the city of Chicago. This was essentially a racially polarized political conflict that blocked the agenda of Washington and his allies.

After Washington was elected – and in spite of the fact that African Americans and Latinos comprised 55 percent of the votes in the city's 49 wards – only 15 Blacks and one Latino served as alderperson. Gerrymandering had prevented the Black and Latino majorities from electing candidates from their own communities. Washington's supporters and allies waged an unprecedented and successful battle over redistricting. Their broad, multiracial coalition then used grassroots organizing techniques that resulted in electoral wins. Those victories brought an end to the Council Wars that had paralyzed Chicago's city council since Washington was elected. Several prominent Democrats, led by Party Chairman Edward Vrdolyak, defected to the Republican Party. George Dunne, who had aligned himself with Harold Washington during the Council Wars period, was re-elected to the party chairmanship after Vrydolyak resigned following his defeat by Washington in the 1987 Mayoral election. Washington's death in the fall of 1987, a half-year into his second term, fractured the Washington political coalition. No subsequent African-American candidate was able to unify the West and South Side African-American communities or mobilize the same degree of support among white liberals as well as Washington had.

In 2008, Vrdolyak, former Democratic Committeeman from Chicago's 10th Ward, Chicago alderperson, and former Cook County Democratic Party Chairman, pleaded guilty to conspiracy to commit mail and wire fraud related to the sale of property by the Chicago Medical School.

=== Under Tom Lyons ===
Dunne did not seek re-election to the party chairmanship in 1990, amidst a scandal in which he admitted having sex with female county employees who alleged they were pressured into providing sexual favors to him. Following Dunne's departure, Thomas G. Lyons was elected chairman of the party and would serve in that capacity for 17 years. He had also been the 45th Ward committeeman and was a lawmaker, lawyer and lobbyist. After the March, 2000 County elections, Pulitzer Prize-winning Chicago Tribune editorial page editor R. Bruce Dold wrote in an op-ed,

Nobody wants to be the chairman of the Cook County Democratic Party, the job once held by Richard J. Daley, the job that made George Dunne a powerful man. Nobody wants it because the Democratic Party of Cook County has become nothing more than a distraction for the one Democrat who counts, Mayor Richard M. Daley. ... The Democrats, though, they had a thing of beauty, a big, genuine, political machine. But then it became a victim of Jane Byrne. And then it became a victim of Harold Washington. And now it's a victim of indifference.

Richard M. Daley's political operation was largely separate from the county organization. His power bloc included the growing Hispanic community, through a "powerful and feared patronage army" known as the Hispanic Democratic Organization. Unlike his father, the younger Daley also reached out to those who initially opposed him, and primarily through negotiated apportionment of city funds for alderpersons' local projects, was able to gain control of the City Council to a degree that only the elder Daley ever enjoyed. In July 2005, the federal court-appointed Shakman monitor reported widespread abuses of a previous court decree against patronage hiring. On July 5, 2006, Robert Sorich, formally, Daley's director of the Mayor's Office of Intergovernmental Affairs and, informally, Daley's patronage chief, and Timothy McCarthy, Sorich's aide, were each convicted on two counts of mail fraud connected to rigging blue-collar city jobs and promotions.

In 1995, Mel Reynolds, Democratic congressman from Illinois's 2nd congressional district, which includes parts of the south side of Chicago and south suburbs in Cook County and parts of Will and Kankakee Counties, was convicted on 12 counts of sexual assault, obstruction of justice and solicitation of child pornography, and while serving his sentence, was convicted on 16 unrelated counts of bank fraud, misusing campaign funds for personal use and lying to FEC investigators.

Lyons died in 2007. Shortly after Lyons death, 13th Ward committeeman Michael Madigan said, "The party's been going through transition for a long time. This is a completely different Democratic Party than the one I joined in 1969." Richard M. Daley retired in 2011.

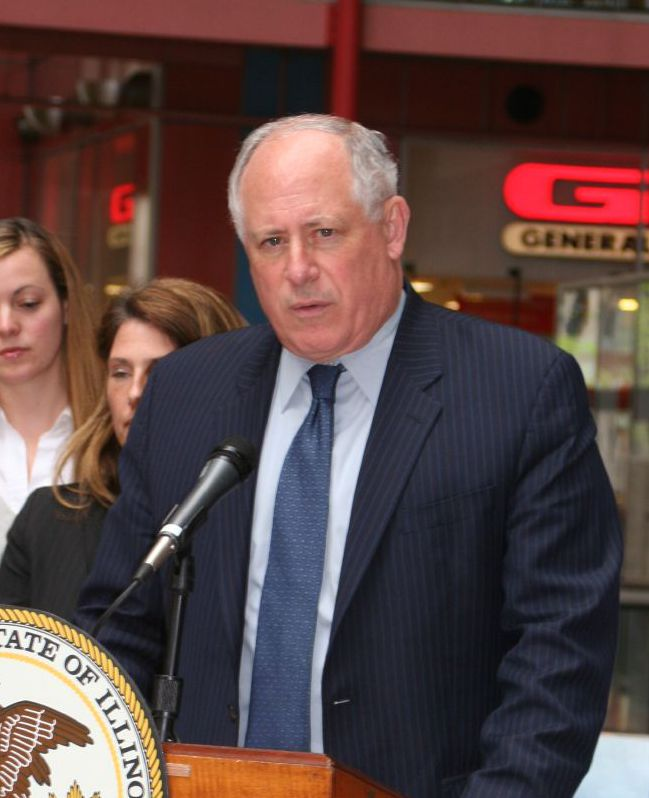
"It's really important to see that the Democratic Party made great inroads in suburban communities and I think that's healthy for our democracy in Illinois." – Illinois Governor Pat Quinn, November 2012

=== Under Joseph Berrios ===
On February 1, 2007, Joseph Berrios was unanimously elected Chairman of the Cook County Democratic Party and headed the organization until April 18, 2018. Berrios is the first Hispanic to serve as Party chairman. In 2010 Cook County Board President Toni Preckwinkle, a Berrios political ally, said, "When Joe came in, for the first time, African-Americans, Latinos, women had a real opportunity for leadership in the party and had a real opportunity to be slated by the party."

The party has recently won several notable elections in suburban Cook County. At the county level, the Democratic committeeman of Wheeling Township, Patrick Botterman, engineered Brendan Houlihan's successful campaign for Commissioner of Cook County Board of Review in 2006.

Berrios has been the subject of numerous investigations and legal proceedings involving ethical violations, corruption, fraud and nepotism. He has defended his right in the press and in courts to hire and promote family members and friends to taxpayer funded positions.

=== Under Toni Preckwinkle ===
On April 18, 2018, Toni Preckwinkle was unanimously elected Chair of the Cook County Democratic Party. She became the first woman and first African-American to hold the position.

== List of chairs ==
Name	Ward	Years served
John McGillen	21	(fl. 1893)
Thomas Gahan	29	(1895–1902)
Thomas Gallagher	19	(1902)
Thomas Carey	29	(fl. 1904)
William L. O'Connell	6	(fl. 1909)
John McCarthy	2	(fl. 1912)
Roger C. Sullivan	14	(1915–1920)
George E. Brennan	32	(1920–1928)
Anton Cermak	12	(1928–1931)
Patrick Nash	28	(1931–1943)
Edward Joseph Kelly	11	(1943–1946)
Jacob Arvey	24	(1946–1950)
Joseph L. Gill	46	(1950–1953)
Richard J. Daley	11	(1953–1976)
George Dunne	42	(1976–1982, 1987–1990)
Edward Vrdolyak	10	(1982–1987)
Thomas G. Lyons	45	(1990–2007)
Joseph Berrios	31	(2007–2018)
Toni Preckwinkle	4	(2018–present)

== Public corruption convictions ==
Examples of high-profile cases which have resulted in the conviction of members of the Cook County Democratic Party include Rod Blagojevich, Isaac Carothers, Arenda Troutman, and Jesse Jackson, Jr.

== See also ==
- Cook County Republican Party
- Political history of Chicago
- Shakman v. Democratic Organization of Cook County
