= Courtney Reum =

American entrepreneur

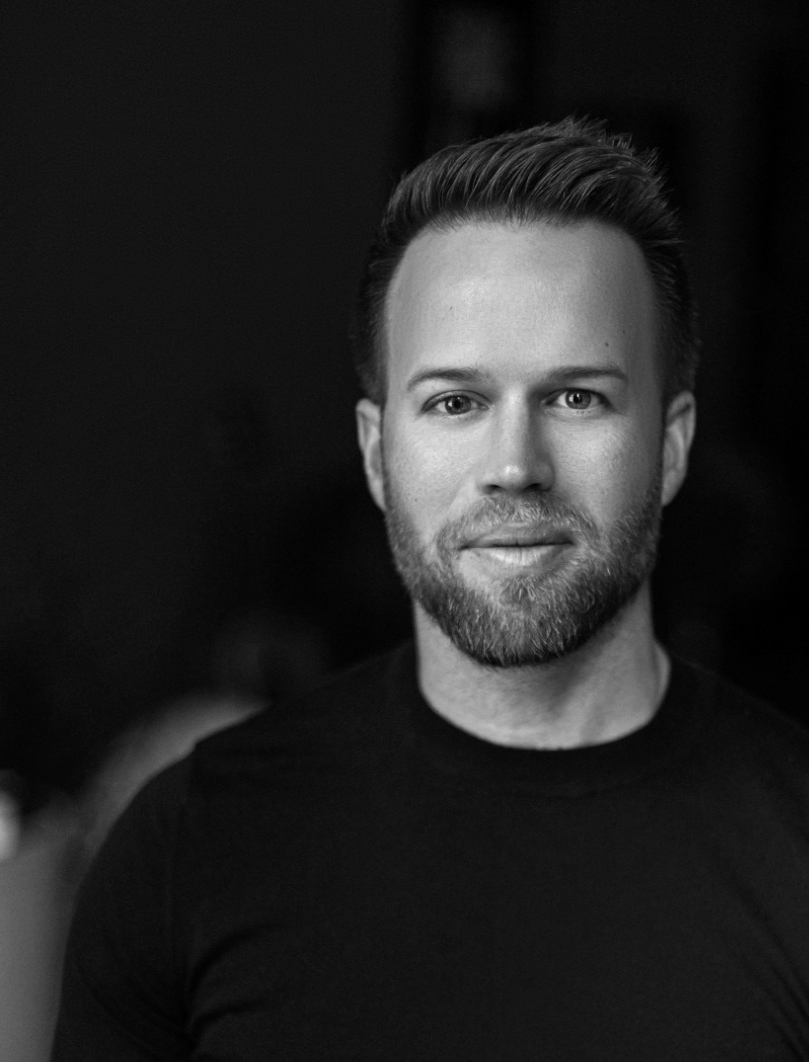
- Born: Courtney James Reum; July 8, 1978 (age 48); Wayne, Illinois, U.S.
- Education: Columbia University (BA); Harvard Business School (OPM)
- Occupations: Entrepreneur, investor
- Spouse: Maggie Sellers Reum (m. 2025)
- Relatives: Carter Reum (brother); Paris Hilton (sister-in-law)
Association football career
- Position: Forward
Youth career
- Chicago Sockers
College career
Years	Team	Apps	(Gls)
1998–2001	Columbia Lions		
Senior career*
Years	Team	Apps	(Gls)
2024	Länk Vilaverdense	1	(0)
- * Club domestic league appearances and goals
- Website: m13.co

Courtney James Reum (born July 8, 1978) is an American entrepreneur, product developer, and investment banker.

== Early life ==
Courtney Reum grew up in Wayne, Illinois, a rural suburb of Chicago, where he was raised by his parents, Sherry and Robert Reum, the former CEO of Amsted Industries. Reum studied economics and philosophy and graduated with distinction from Columbia University, where he was a member of the Varsity Men's Soccer Team. He is also an alumnus of Harvard Business School. His brother, Carter Reum is married to Paris Hilton. He also has a sister, Halle Reum, who is married to Oliver Hammond, a scion of the Annenberg family.

== Career ==
He is a former investment banker at Goldman Sachs who worked with companies including Under Armour, Vitaminwater and Procter & Gamble. At Goldman Sachs he worked on the merger of Allied Domecq and Pernod Ricard, an experience that led to the creation of his own alcohol company, VeeV, which he launched with his brother Carter. Together, they made the company a national brand available in bars, restaurants, national chains and retailers. The product also spawned the first line of certified organic RTD cocktails called VitaFrute. Reum and his brother sold the brand in 2016.

Reum was made an Inc "500 Fastest Growing Private Companies in America" and named one of Beverage Information's Rising Stars and recipient of the Technomic Fast 50 Award.

Reum launched the investment and brand development firm M13 with his brother and business partner in 2016. The investment firm focuses on start-up consumer product companies whose intention and brand messaging appeal to the trends that interest Millennials in health, environmental concerns and achievements. In April 2016 it was reported that M13 would be syndicating $100 million in investments into dozens of start up companies.

He has been featured on the Forbes "30 Under 30" list, the Inc "500 fastest growing private companies in America," Richard Branson's book Screw Business as Usual, and most recently the Goldman Sachs Builders + Innovators 100 Most Intriguing Entrepreneurs. He is a columnist for Inc Magazine, and an occasional media personality appearing on the television series Hatched which appears on a variety of networks including FOX and CBS. Reum was added to the board of directors of Los Angeles Opera in September 2015. He also serves as commissioner of the Los Angeles Convention Center & Tourism Authority.

=== Soccer ===
Reum played soccer throughout his youth, and played college soccer for the Columbia Lions. He later became involved with 49ers Enterprises, who, from 2018, were minority investors of Leeds United, before taking over in 2023.

In January 2024, Reum signed for Liga Portugal SABSEG club Länk Vilaverdense, even though he had not played professionally before. Described as having the energy of a 20 year old, the club were in the relegation zone at the time of his signing. On May 5, Reum made his debut for the club, coming on as a late substitute, but could not prevent their relegation as they lost 1–0 to Torreense.

=== Personal life ===
In March 2024, Reum started a relationship with entrepreneur and podcaster Maggie Sellers. In March of 2025, the couple purchased Will Arnett's home. Reum and Sellers were married in Beverly Hills, CA on August 28, 2025.
