= Elmer Gertz =

American jurist and activist (1906–2000)

Elmer Gertz (September 14, 1906 – April 27, 2000) was an American lawyer, writer, law professor, and civil rights activist. During his lengthy legal career he won some high-profile cases, most notably parole for notorious killer Nathan Leopold and the obscenity trial of Henry Miller's novel Tropic of Cancer, a book published in France but banned in the United States because of its "candid sexuality" in describing the author's life in Paris. In addition to accounts of his cases and career, he also reviewed books and edited a collection of works by Frank Harris, whom he represented as literary agent for a while.

He is best remembered in the legal world, however, for a case in which he was not an advocate but a plaintiff: Gertz v. Robert Welch, Inc., a libel action he brought against the John Birch Society in 1969 after it accused him of being part of a Communist conspiracy to discredit local police departments. He prevailed, but only after a 14-year battle that saw the case go before the Supreme Court, which ruled that as a private figure Gertz did not have to prove actual malice on the defendants' part. When the case finally went to trial, the jury found in favor of Elmer Gertz and awarded him compensatory damages of $100,000 and punitive damages of $300,000. The award was upheld on appeal.

== Early life ==
A Jew of Lithuanian descent, Gertz was born to Morris and Grace Gertz in Chicago's Maxwell Street neighborhood. He attended elementary school with future Supreme Court Justice Arthur Goldberg. At the age of ten, his mother dead and his father unable to care for his children, he spent the remainder of his childhood in orphanages in Chicago and Cleveland.

== Education ==
He graduated from Crane Technical High School, where he made the acquaintance of other young men who would become famous in their own right: authors Meyer Levin and Leo Rosten and newspaper magnate Leo Lerner. Afterwards, he attended the University of Chicago and its law school. He received his J.D. degree in 1930 and went to work in the firm of the well-connected Jacob Arvey. He would remain there for another 14 years.

He remained involved in education throughout his life, teaching a civil rights class at The John Marshall Law School until his death in 2000.

== Legal career ==
As a law student, Gertz had been inspired by Clarence Darrow's famous argument against the death penalty in the Leopold-Loeb trial. He himself achieved national fame when he won parole for Nathan Leopold, the surviving half of the infamous thrill-killing duo, in 1958. He made a point of walking out of the prison gates with his client.

He and Miller became good friends after he persuaded a court to lift the ban on Tropic of Cancer, a decision the Supreme Court upheld in 1964's Grove Press, Inc., v. Gerstein.

In the mid-1960s, Gertz emulated his legal inspiration, Clarence Darrow, when he argued against the death sentence handed down to Jack Ruby for killing Lee Harvey Oswald. It was overturned, and Ruby, who was terminally ill, served the remaining few years of his life in prison.

== Educator ==
In addition to his law practice, Elmer Gertz was an adjunct professor teaching Civil Rights Law at The John Marshall Law School in Chicago, where he taught classes in civil rights.

== Libel suit against John Birch Society ==
In 1969, Elmer Gertz represented the family of a young man killed by a Chicago police officer. This drew the ire of the John Birch Society, which alleged in an article about the case in its magazine, American Opinion, that he had a criminal record and was part of a Communist conspiracy to discredit local police departments in order to pave the way for Communist control by a national police force.

He sued the Society for defamation and won a $500,000 judgment. On appeal, the case went all the way to the Supreme Court, which was asked to settle the question of whether or not Gertz was a public figure, who would thus have to prove actual malice to win (which he probably could not have). In 1974, the Court ruled in a 5–4 decision that he was not a public figure and that states were free to set their own standards for libel when they were alleged by a private figure. Ironically, given his successes in fighting censorship, some of the dissenting justices and other commentators have viewed his victory as limiting First Amendment rights.

The case went back to a six-day trial where Gertz once again prevailed and was awarded $100,000 in compensatory damages and $300,000 in punitive damages. The U.S. Court of Appeals for the Seventh Circuit affirmed the award and the U.S. Supreme Court declined further review.

A few years later, Gertz and his wife went on a round-the-world, luxury cruise with the money he won and sent "wish you were here" postcards back to Welch and his organization every chance they got.

== Political and social activism ==
In the 1940s, he was active in the fair housing movement, serving on several public bodies devoted to the subject. He presciently warned against the creation of large housing projects, advocating a more scattered approach instead. He also campaigned for the admission of African Americans to the local bar association.

In 1969, he was elected to the Illinois Constitutional Convention, where he chaired the committee on its Bill of Rights, working closely with the committee's legal counsel, Dallin H. Oaks. It has been called the strongest bill of rights of any state constitution at that point in time. A decade later, he chaired the equivalent committees of the Illinois and Chicago bar associations. He also served as chairman of the Lawyers' Association. After his death, the Illinois State Bar Association created the Elmer Gertz Lawyer Award in 2000 to recognize lawyers for their exceptional dedication to protecting civil liberties.

Elmer Gertz received Israel's Prime Minister's Medal in 1972 for his service on that country's behalf, and considered that his finest accomplishment.

"Things do change for the better," he assured some students near the end of his life, "very, very slowly."

== Elmer Gertz Lawyer Award ==
The Illinois State Bar Association established the Elmer Gertz Lawyer Award in 2000 to recognize lawyers who have shown a continued commitment to preserve and advance human rights. For many years the award was jointly presented with the Blind Service Association, where Elmer Gertz was a board member. The award has been given to the following persons or entities:

- 2001 - Gregory A. Adamski
- 2002 - Prof. Ralph Ruebner, The John Marshall Law School (Chicago)
- 2003 - Prof. Victor J. Stone, University of Illinois College of Law
- 2004 - Fay Clayton, Chicago
- 2005 - Award not given
- 2006 - Prof. Michael P. Seng, The John Marshall Law School (Chicago)
- 2007 - R. Eugene Pincham, Retired Justice, Illinois Appellate Court
- 2008 - Prof. Doug Cassel, Notre Dame University School of Law
- 2009 - Award not given
- 2010 - Award not given
- 2011 - Award not given
- 2012 - Judge Martha A. Mills, Cook County Circuit Court
- 2013 - Jody Raphael, Schiller DuCanto & Fleck Family Law Center, DePaul University College of Law (Chicago)
- 2014 - Barbara Blaine

== Bibliography ==
- The Best is Yet To Be
- Carl Sandburg: Is He the Poet of The People? 1946
- Charter for a New Age: Inside the Sixth Illinois Constitutional Convention, 1980
- The Diary of a Public Man, 1945
- For the First Hours of Tomorrow: The New Illinois Bill of Rights, 1972
- Gertz v. Robert Welch: The Story of the Landmark Libel Case, 1992
- Frank Harris and Henry Miller: Two Lives Intertwined With Mine
- A Handful of Clients
- Moment of Madness: The People vs. Jack Ruby, 1968
- Reflections on Henry Miller's Centennial Celebration
- Odyssey of a Barbarian: The Biography of George Sylvester Viereck, 1979
- Quest for a Constitution: A Man Who Wouldn't Quit, 1984
- To Life: The Story of A Chicago Lawyer, 1990

See also

Ronald K.L. Collins & Sam Chaltain, We Must not be Afraid to be Free: Stories of Free Expression in America (Oxford U. Press, 2011)
