= Carter Reum =

American writer and entrepreneur (born 1981)

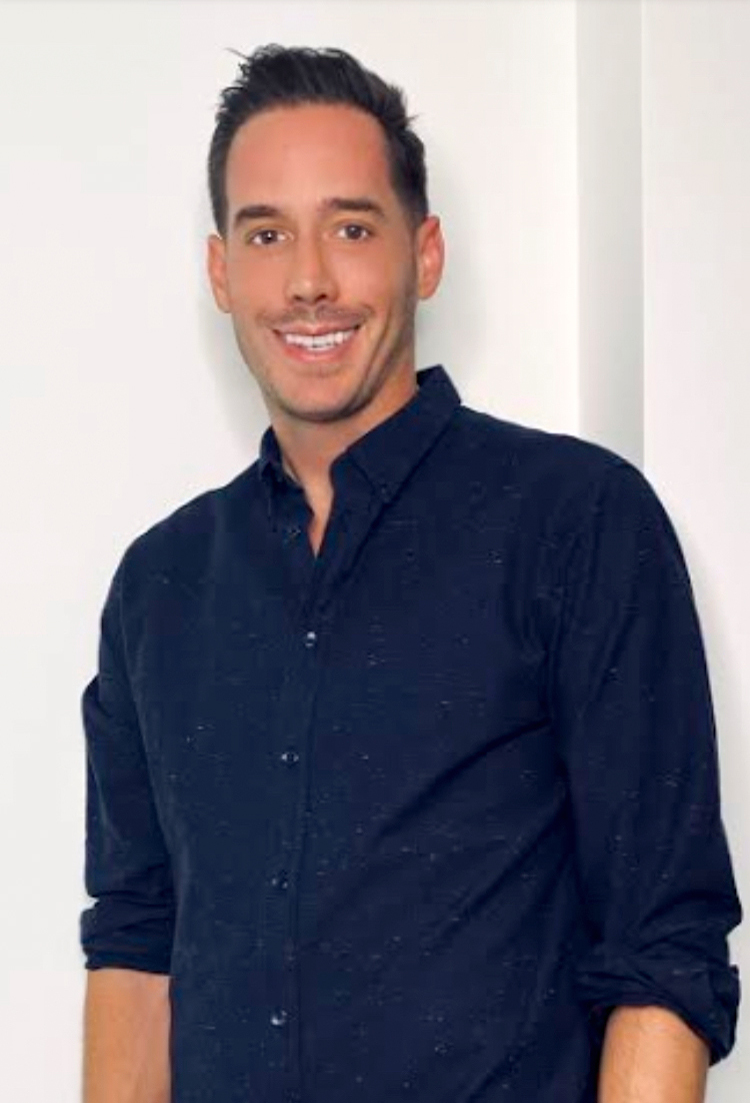
- Reum in February 2021
- Born: Carter Milliken Reum; February 5, 1981 (age 45)
- Education: Columbia University
- Occupations: entrepreneur; investor; writer
- Spouse: Paris Hilton (m. 2021)
- Children: 3
- Relatives: Courtney Reum (brother)
- Writing career
- Notable work: Shortcut Your Startup: Ten Ways to Speed Up Entrepreneurial Success (book)
- Website: m13.co (website of his company)

Carter Milliken Reum (born February 5, 1981) is an American entrepreneur, venture capitalist, and writer. He is the founder of M13 Ventures, an angel investment firm. He is married to Paris Hilton.

== Early life and education ==
Carter Milliken Reum was born on February 5, 1981, to Sherry and Robert Reum. His father was chairman, president and chief executive officer of Chicago-based Amsted Industries, which was ranked as one of the United States' largest private companies by Forbes magazine. He has two siblings, a brother named Courtney and a sister named Halle. The latter is married to Oliver Hammond, a scion of the Annenberg family.

Reum graduated from Columbia College of Columbia University in 2003. He is an alumnus of Zeta Beta Tau fraternity, initiated into its Delta Chapter at Columbia University.

== Career ==
Alongside his brother, Courtney, Reum co-founded the alcohol brand VEEV Spirits, a company listed in Inc. Magazine's 5,000 fastest-growing private companies in the United States in 2018.

Reum has been featured in episodes of the television series Hatched and has appeared as a guest and a commentator on a variety of networks including CBS and Fox. He is also a contributing writer for the Huffington Post and Inc. magazine. Additionally, he is the co-founder of the investment firm M13.

In 2016, Reum started the venture-capital firm M13 Investments. M13 was recognized as the fourteenth-top performer in the 2023 HEC-Dow Jones Venture Capital Performance Ranking, which evaluates the world's top global venture-capital firms. M13 was one of only eight U.S.-based firms to be included in the top-twenty rankings for that year.

== Publications ==
In 2018, Random House and Penguin Books released Shortcut Your Startup: Ten Ways to Speed Up Entrepreneurial Success. Reum co-wrote the book with his brother, Courtney. The book uses the Reums' experiences to teach entrepreneurs how to reach their goals. They pull from their experiences creating Veev and from the lessons learned through the years investing in companies including SpaceX, Lyft, Pinterest and Warby Parker.

== Personal life ==
Reum has a daughter, born in 2013, with former actress Laura Bellizzi.

Reum began dating media personality Paris Hilton in December 2019. After becoming engaged on February 13, 2021, Hilton and Reum were married in Los Angeles on November 11. They have a son and a daughter born via surrogacy in January and November 2023, respectively.
