= Patronage =

Support that one organization or individual bestows to another

Patronage is the support, encouragement, privilege, or financial aid that an organization or individual bestows on another. In the history of art, art patronage refers to the support that princes, popes, and other wealthy and influential people have provided to artists such as musicians, painters, and sculptors. It can also refer to the right of bestowing offices or church benefices, the business given to a store by a regular customer, and the guardianship of saints. The word patron derives from the Latin patronus ('patron'), one who gives benefits to his clients (see patronage in ancient Rome).

In some countries, the term is used to describe political patronage or patronal politics, which is the use of state resources to reward individuals for their electoral support. Some patronage systems are legal, as in the Canadian tradition of the prime minister appointing senators and the heads of a number of commissions and agencies; in many cases, these appointments go to people who have supported the political party of the prime minister. The term is also used to refer to a type of corruption or favoritism in which a party in power rewards groups, families, or ethnicities for their electoral support illegally using gifts, appointments to positions, or government contracts.

In many systems, corrupt patronage developed as a means of maintaining control over the populace, concentrating economic and political power in a small minority which held privileges that the majority of the population did not. In this system, the patron holds authority and influence over a less powerful person, whom he protects by granting favors in exchange for loyalty and allegiance. The system, with roots in feudalism, was designed to maintain an inexpensive, subservient labor force, which could be utilized to limit production costs and allow wealth and its privileges to be monopolized by a small elite. Long after slavery, and other forms of bondage such as the encomienda and repartimiento systems were abolished, patronage was used to maintain rigid class structures. With the rise of a labor class, traditional patronage changed in the 20th century to allow some participation in power structures, but many systems still favor a small powerful elite, who distribute economic and political favors in exchange for benefits to the lower classes.

== Arts ==
From the ancient world onward, patronage of the arts was important in art history. It is known in greatest detail in reference to medieval and Renaissance Europe, though patronage can also be traced in feudal Japan, the traditional Southeast Asian kingdoms, and elsewhere—art patronage tended to arise wherever a royal or imperial system and an aristocracy dominated a society and controlled a significant share of resources. Samuel Johnson defined a patron as "one who looks with unconcern on a man struggling for life in the water, and, when he has reached the ground, encumbers him with help".

Rulers, nobles, and very wealthy people used patronage of the arts to endorse their political ambitions, social positions, and prestige. That is, patrons operated as sponsors. Some Romance and Germanic languages have terms for patrons (such as the English "mecenate") that are derived from the name of Gaius Maecenas, generous friend and adviser to the Roman Emperor Augustus. Some patrons, such as the Medici family of Florence, used artistic patronage to "cleanse" wealth that was perceived as ill-gotten through usury. Art patronage was especially important in the creation of religious art. The Roman Catholic Church and later Protestant groups sponsored art and architecture, as seen in churches, cathedrals, painting, sculpture and handicrafts.

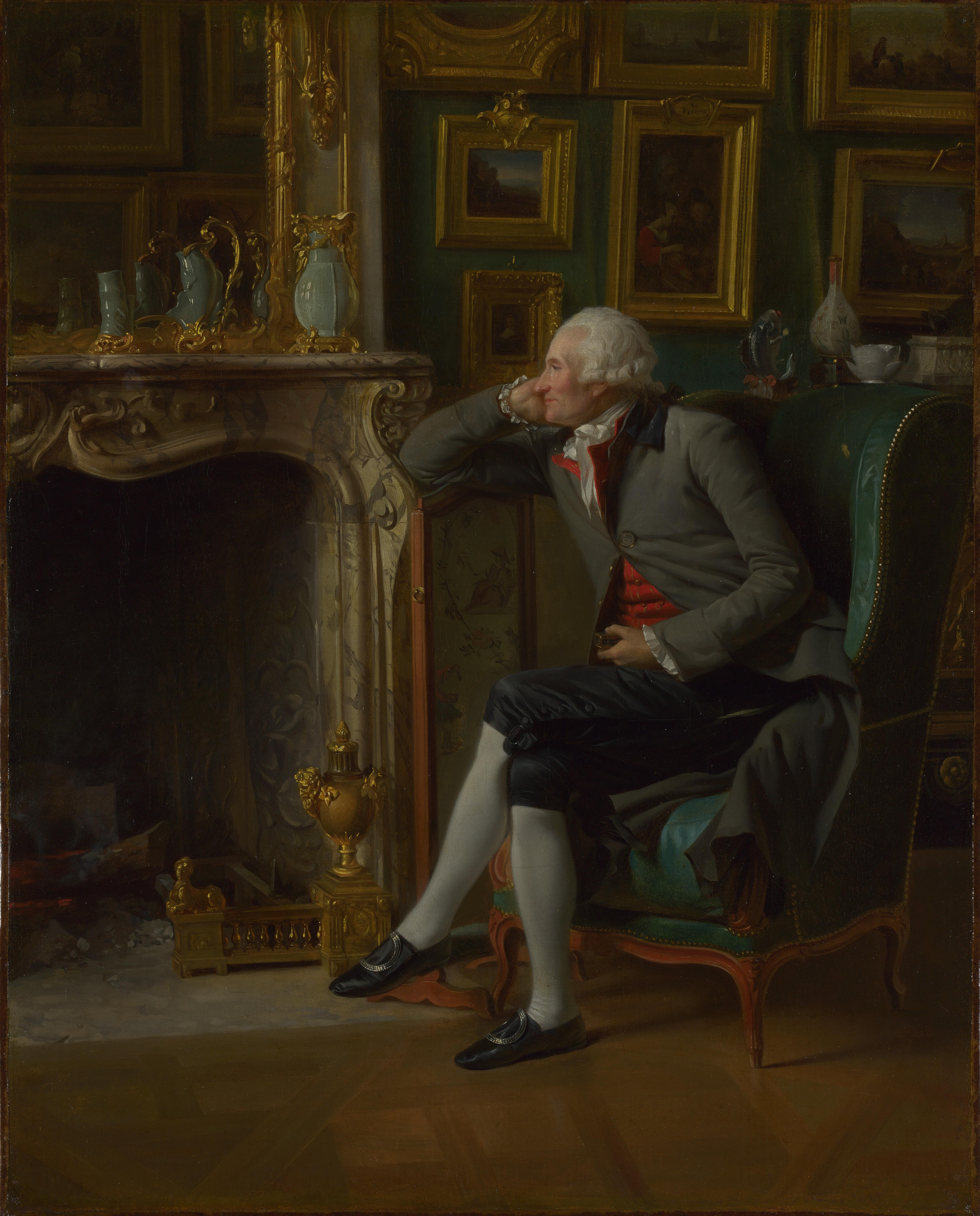
Le Baron de Besenval dans son salon de compagnie at the Hôtel de Besenval, by Henri-Pierre Danloux (1791). As in the field of the arts, the baron was also a patron in the field of botany. In 1782, Pierre-Joseph Buc'hoz named a plant after the baron to thank him for his support. This plant had already received its scientific name a few years earlier and is therefore not known today as Besenvalia senegalensis but as Oncoba spinosa.

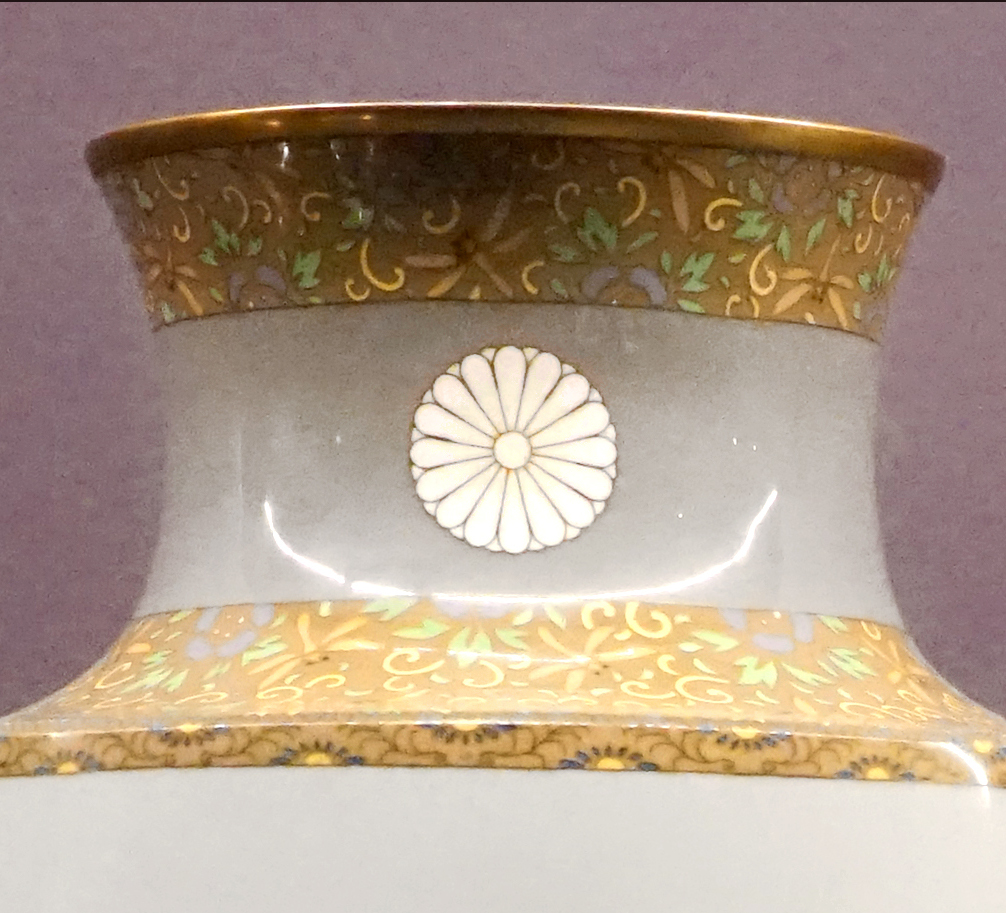
19th-century Japanese vase bearing the Imperial chrysanthemum, showing that it was commissioned by the Imperial family

While sponsorship of artists and the commissioning of artwork is the best-known aspect of the patronage system, other disciplines also benefited from patronage, including those who studied natural philosophy (pre-modern science), musicians, writers, philosophers, alchemists, astrologers, and other scholars. Artists as diverse and important as Chrétien de Troyes, Leonardo da Vinci and Michelangelo, William Shakespeare, and Ben Jonson all sought and enjoyed the support of noble or ecclesiastical patrons. Figures as late as Wolfgang Amadeus Mozart and Ludwig van Beethoven also participated in the system to some degree; it was only with the rise of bourgeois and capitalist social forms in the middle 19th century that European culture moved away from its patronage system to the more publicly supported system of museums, theaters, mass audiences and mass consumption that is familiar in the contemporary world.

This kind of system continues across many fields of the arts. Though the nature of the sponsors has changed—from churches to charitable foundations, and from aristocrats to plutocrats—the term patronage has a more neutral connotation than in politics. It may simply refer to direct support (often financial) of an artist, for example by grants. In the latter part of the 20th century, the academic sub-discipline of patronage studies began to evolve, in recognition of the important and often neglected role that the phenomenon of patronage had played in the cultural life of previous centuries.

== Charity ==
Charitable and other non-profit making organizations often seek one or more influential figureheads to act as patrons. The relationship often does not involve money. As well as conferring credibility, these people can use their contacts and charisma to assist the organization in raising funds or to affect government policy. The British royal family are especially prolific in this respect, devoting a large proportion of their time to a wide range of causes.

== Ecclesiastical ==
=== Anglican ===
See main articles Advowson and Parish

In the Church of England, patronage is the commonly used term for the right to present a candidate to a benefice.

=== Catholic ===
==== Patronage of Our Lady ====
The liturgical feast of the Patronage of Our Lady was first permitted by decree of the Sacred Congregation of Rites on 6 May 1679, for all the ecclesiastical provinces of Spain, in memory of the victories obtained over the Saracens, heretics and other enemies from the sixth century to the reign of Philip IV of Spain. Pope Benedict XIV ordered it to be kept in the Papal States on the third Sunday of November. To other places it is granted, on request, for some Sunday in November, to be designated by the ordinary. In many places, the feast of the Patronage is held with an additional Marian title of Queen of All Saints, of Mercy, Mother of Graces. The Office is taken entirely from the Common of the Blessed Virgin, and the Mass is the "Salve sancta parens".

=== Presbyterian ===
The Church Patronage (Scotland) Act 1711, (in force until 1874) resulted in multiple secessions from the Church of Scotland, including the secession of 1733, which led to the formation of the Associate Presbytery, the secession of 1761, which led to the formation of the Relief Church, and the Disruption of 1843, which led to the formation of the Free Church of Scotland.

== Journalism ==
While most news companies, particularly in North America are funded through advertising revenue, secondary funding sources include audience members and philanthropists who donate to for-profit and non-profit organizations.

== Politics ==
Political leaders have at their disposal a great deal of legally-recognised patronage, in the sense that they make decisions on the appointment of officials inside and outside government (for example on quangos in the UK). Patronage is therefore a recognized power of the executive branch.

In most countries, the executive has the right to make many appointments, some of which may be lucrative (see also sinecures). Often, these appointments have downstream effects that affect the broader robustness of the country, such as where the executive appointments members of boundary commissions whose decisions affect future elections, or judges. In some democracies, high-level appointments are reviewed or approved by the legislature (as in the advice and consent of the United States Senate); in other countries, such as those using the Westminster system, this is not the case, although scrutiny is sometimes conducted through indirect means. In other systems, certain kinds of sensitive positions, like judicial officers or senior civil servants are filled by, on the advice or, or after vetting by, independent commissions.

Other types of political patronage may violate the laws or ethics codes, such as when political leaders engage in nepotism (hiring family members) and cronyism such as fraudulently awarding non-competitive government contracts to friends or relatives or pressuring the public service to hire an unqualified family member or friend.

=== Philippines ===
Political patronage, also known as "padrino system", has been the source of many controversies and corruption. It has been regarded as an open secret that one cannot join the political arena of the Philippines without mastery of the padrino system. From the lowest barangay official to the President of the Republic, it is expected that one gains political debts and dispenses political favor to advance one's career or gain influence if not wealth.

=== Russia ===
After Soviet leader Vladimir Lenin retired from politics in March 1923 following a stroke, a power struggle began between Soviet Premier Alexei Rykov, Pravda editor Nikolai Bukharin, Profintern leader Mikhail Tomsky, Red Army founder Leon Trotsky, former Premier Lev Kamenev, Comintern leader Grigory Zinoviev, and General Secretary Joseph Stalin. Stalin used patronage to appoint many Stalinist delegates (such as Vyacheslav Molotov, Lazar Kaganovich, Grigory Ordzhonikidze, and Mikhail Kalinin) to the Party Politburo and Sovnarkom in order to sway the votes in his favour, making Stalin the effective leader of the country by 1929.

=== South Africa ===
In 2012, the African National Congress (ANC) mayor of Beaufort West in the Western Cape Province wrote a letter that openly and illegally solicited funds from the Construction Education and Training Authority for the ANC's 2016 election campaign. This episode, amongst many others including instances revolving around President Jacob Zuma, revealed how the African National Congress as ruling the political party utilized patronage to reward supporters and strengthen the leading faction of the party's control over governmental institutions.

=== Thailand ===
In Thai politics, baan yai (Thai: บ้านใหญ่, lit. 'big house(s)') refers to powerful local wealthy political clans and dynasties that control rural constituencies. Instead of running a campaign based on political ideology or a specific political party, these clans and dynasties use a system of patronage networks to secure loyalty and mobilize voters by offering jobs, financial assistance, or favors to constituents. The baan yai dominate local and sometimes even provincial politics in the country, and are seen as a part of the conservative establishment. Newer progressive and reformist forces, such as the People's Party, struggle to compete against baan yai networks, and the party's failure to do so has been described as one of the main reasons for their poor performance in the 2025 municipal and provincial administrative organization elections and the 2026 Thai general election, and inversely the success of the Bhumjaithai Party.

=== United States ===
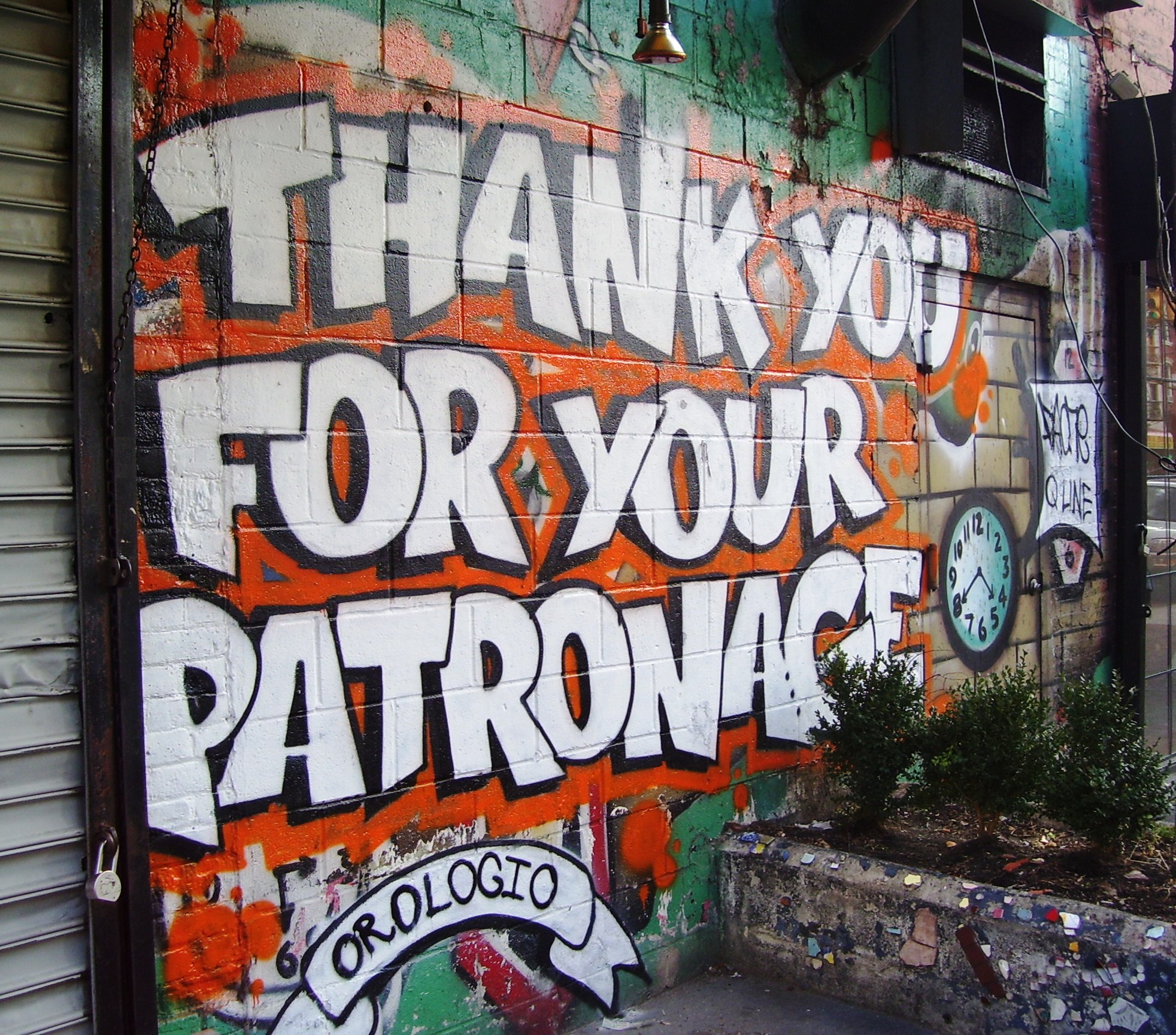
A "Thank you for your patronage" message (in the sense "Thank you for being our customer") from Orologio Restaurant in the Alphabet City area of the East Village neighborhood of Manhattan, New York City

In the United States during the Gilded Age, patronage became a controversial issue. Tammany boss William M. Tweed was an American politician who ran what is considered now to have been one of the most corrupt political machines in the country's history. Tweed and his corrupt associates ruled for a brief time with absolute power over the city and state of New York. At the height of his influence, Tweed was the third-largest landowner in New York City, a director of the Erie Railway, the Tenth National Bank, and the New York Printing Company, as well as proprietor of the Metropolitan Hotel. At times he was a member of the United States House of Representatives, the New York City Board of Advisors, and the New York State Senate. In 1873, Tweed was convicted for diverting between $40 million and $200 million of public monies.

Six months after James Garfield became president in 1881, Charles J. Guiteau, a disappointed office-seeker, assassinated him. To prevent further political violence and to assuage public outrage, Congress passed the Pendleton Act in 1883, which set up the Civil Service Commission. Henceforth, applicants for most federal government jobs would have to pass an examination. Federal politicians' influence over bureaucratic appointments waned, and patronage declined as a national political issue.

Beginning in 1969, a Supreme Court case in Chicago, Michael L. Shakman v. Democratic Organization of Cook County, occurred involving political patronage and its constitutionality. Shakman claimed that much of the patronage going on in Chicago politics was unlawful on the grounds of the First and Fourteenth Amendments. Through a series of legal battles and negotiations, the two parties agreed upon The Shakman Decrees. Under these decrees, it was declared that the employment status of most public employees could not be affected positively or negatively based on political allegiance, with exceptions for politically inclined positions. The case is still in negotiation today, as there are points yet to be decided.

Political patronage is not always considered corrupt. In the United States, the U.S. Constitution provides the president with the power to appoint individuals to government positions. The president also may appoint personal advisers without congressional approval. Not surprisingly, these individuals tend to be supporters of the president. Similarly, at the state and local levels, governors and mayors retain appointment powers. Some scholars have argued that patronage may be used for laudable purposes, such as the "recognition" of minority communities through the appointment of their members to a high-profile position. Bearfield has argued that patronage be used for four general purposes: to create or strengthen a political organization; achieve democratic or egalitarian goals; bridge political divisions and create coalitions, and alter the existing patronage system.

=== Venezuela ===
Boliburguesía is a term that was coined by journalist Juan Carlos Zapata in order to "define the oligarchy that has developed under the protection of the Chavez government". During Hugo Chávez's tenure, he seized thousands of properties and businesses while also reducing the footprint of foreign companies. Venezuela's economy was then largely state-run and was operated by military officers who had their business and government affairs connected. Senior fellow at the Brookings Institution, Harold Trinkunas, stated that involving the military in business was "a danger", with Trinkunas explaining that the Venezuelan military "has the greatest ability to coerce people, into business like they have". According to Bloomberg Business, "[b]y showering contracts on former military officials and pro-government business executives, Chavez put a new face on the system of patronage".

== Science ==
There are historical examples where the noble classes financed scientific pursuits.

Many Barmakids were patrons of the sciences, which greatly helped the propagation of Indian science and scholarship from the neighboring Academy of Gundishapur into the Arabic world. They patronized scholars such as Jabir ibn Hayyan and Jabril ibn Bukhtishu. They are also credited with the establishment of the first paper mill in Baghdad. The power of the Barmakids in those times is reflected in The Book of One Thousand and One Nights; the vizier Ja'far appears in several stories, as well as a tale that gave rise to the expression "Barmecide feast".

We know of Yahya b Khalid al Barmaki (805) as a patron of physicians and, specifically, of the translation of Hindu medical works into both Arabic and Persian. In all likelihood, however, his activity took place in the orbit of the caliphal court in Iraq, where at the behest of Harun al Rashid (786 -809), such books were translated into Arabic. Thus Khurasan and Transoxania were effectively bypassed in this transfer of learning from India to Islam, even though, undeniably the Barmakis cultural outlook owed something to their land of origin, northern Afghanistan, and Yahya al Barmaki's interest in medicine may have derived from no longer identifiable family tradition.

== Sports ==
In the same manner as commercial patronage, those who attend a sporting event may be referred to as patrons, though the usage in much of the world is now considered archaic—with some notable exceptions. Those who attend the Masters Tournament, one of the four major championships of professional golf, are still traditionally referred to as "patrons," largely at the insistence of the Augusta National Golf Club. This insistence is occasionally made fun of by sportswriters and other media. In polo, a "patron" is a person who puts together a team by hiring one or more professionals. The rest of the team may be amateurs, often including the patron themself.

Also, people who attend hurling or Gaelic football games organised by the Gaelic Athletic Association are referred to as patrons.

== See also ==
- Angel investor
- Benefactor (law)
- Civil service reform (disambiguation)
- Community-supported agriculture
- Corporate social responsibility
- Patreon
- Premiere
- Sinecure
