= Shakman Decrees =

Federal court orders regarding government employment in Chicago

The Shakman decrees are a series of federal court orders regarding government employment in Chicago, which were issued in 1972, 1979, and 1983, in response to a lawsuit filed by civic reformer Michael Shakman. The decrees bar the practice of political patronage, under which government jobs are given to supporters of a politician or party, and government employees may be fired for not supporting a favored candidate or party.

Shakman filed his initial lawsuit in 1969 and continued the legal battle through 1983. The decrees are compromises, but are considered a victory for Shakman, as political patronage was largely abolished in Chicago.

In 2022, after more than fifty years of litigation, the United States Court of Appeals for the Seventh Circuit vacated the consent decree as to one of the defendants, the governor of Illinois, citing significant progress towards the elimination of political patronage.

== Background ==
Politics in Chicago and in the government of surrounding Cook County had long been dominated by political patronage. Most city and county employees were expected to belong to the political party of the elected official who controlled that agency. (Police officers, firefighters, school teachers, librarians, and health care workers were generally exempted from patronage requirements.) Patronage employees had to support that official and the party organization by donating to campaign funds and performing campaign work: getting signatures on nominating petitions, passing out literature, and going door-to-door to find and cultivate favorable voters. An employee who refused to do this work, or even failed to do it well, could lose his job, whereas the most effective political workers kept their jobs or were promoted, even if they did little or nothing of their official duties. Patronage employees were also forbidden to support any candidate opposed by the political organization to which their patron belonged.

By the 1960s, patronage politics had secured control of Chicago for the Democrats. Democratic candidates for office in Chicago or Cook County-wide were all selected by a "slating committee" of party insiders. (Local Democratic candidates in suburban Cook County were not so chosen.) All Democratic officeholders and their patronage employees were expected to support the party slate. At the apex of this "Machine" was Chicago Mayor Richard J. Daley.

This led to the rise of a faction of "independent" or "reform" Democrats, opposed to the corruption of the Daley Machine, but also opposed to the policies of Republicans at the state and national levels. They ran for various offices (city, county, state legislature), sometimes as Democrats in the primary election and sometimes as independents in the general election, but they almost always lost to the candidates endorsed by the Cook County Democratic slating committee.

Shakman was a reform Democrat. He and the other plaintiffs objected to the support the incumbent Democratic candidates received from public employees which were mandatory for those desiring to keep their jobs. Shakman felt that it was a violation of employee rights and free elections, and an abuse of public funds.

== Shakman case ==
Shakman filed a class action suit against the Democratic Organization of Cook County, claiming that political patronage employment violated the First Amendment and the equal protection clause of the Fourteenth Amendment of the United States Constitution. Shakman asserted that the defendants, including a number of government employees and politicians, violated public employees' right of free speech by requiring them to support the slated candidates and by punishing them for supporting opposing candidates. He also asserted that the use of public employees to do political work instead of their official duties was an unnecessary burden on taxpayers. He sought declaratory and injunctive relief.

The case was dismissed in 1969, but reinstated in 1970, leading to a long deliberation. After the reinstatement of the case, the plaintiffs and many of the defendants entered into a consent decree on most of the issues in the complaint. The defendants agreed to most of the complaints and resolved to make amends. Stipulations of fact were next filed to resolve the remaining issues.

== Decrees ==
The series of decrees that followed from this case resulted in major changes to hiring and firing proceedings for public employees. The decrees effectively ended traditional political patronage in Chicago and Cook County.

=== 1972 decree ===
Following long deliberation and compromise, the two sides agreed that firing, demoting, transferring or punishing a government employee for political positions was unconstitutional and illegal. However, they agreed that the political position of a person in a policy-making job was relevant to the person's job, and therefore could be a legitimate reason to fire, demote, or transfer the employee. These jobs were exempted. The decree embodying this agreement was issued in 1972.

=== 1979 decree ===
After the 1972 decree, negotiations stalled for several years, and the defendants blocked further action. However, Shakman persuaded the court that refusal to hire an otherwise qualified individual for political reasons was unconstitutional, and also that the defendants had avoided negotiations on this point. The court therefore decreed in 1979 that both parties were required to proceed with negotiations on the subject.

=== 1983 decree ===
The final Shakman decree was issued in 1983. It declared that the defendant agencies could not refuse to hire a qualified individual for political reasons. As with the 1972 decree, policy-making jobs were exempted.

== Significance ==
The Shakman decrees largely eliminated patronage employment as a source of political funds and manpower. Since they could not be fired for refusing, the employees of the defendant agencies stopped donating money or doing political work. This resulted in a general loss of authority for the Cook County Democratic Organization (CCDO) and the mayor of Chicago. The CCDO continued to endorse candidates in each primary election, but the endorsement had far less influence than in the past. In many recent elections, the CCDO made no endorsements at all.

== Criticism ==
The Shakman decrees were criticized by those who felt a politician or faction should be able to reward supporters with jobs. The first black mayor of Chicago, Harold Washington (1983–1987), complained that he could not replace any of the generally hostile city workforce with supporters.
