= George B. McKibbin =

American lawyer & politician (1888–1960)

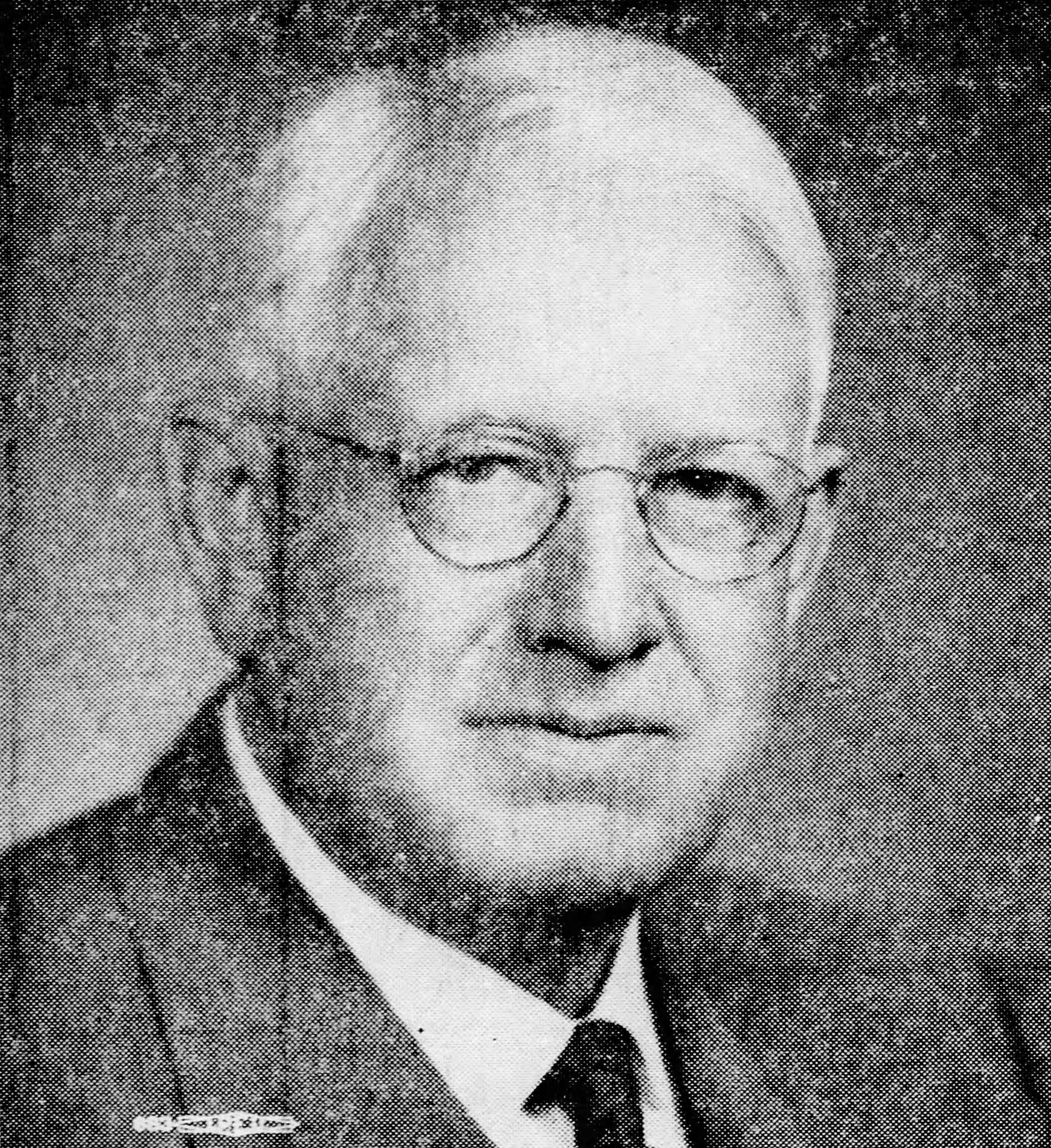
- Photographic portrait of McKibbin, circa 1956

Member of the Government Contract Committee representing the GSA
- In office 1953 – September 14, 1960
- Appointed by: Edmund F. Mansure

Chairman of the Illinois Public Aid Commission
- In office April 1953 – September 14, 1960
- Governor: William Stratton

Government affairs adviser to the military governor of the American occupation zone in Germany
- In office February 10, 1948 – July 1, 1948
- Governor: Lucius D. Clay

Director of the Internal Affairs and Communications Division of the Allied Control Council
- In office July 1, 1947 – July 1, 1948
- Appointed by: Harry S. Truman
- Preceded by: Dwight Griswold
- Succeeded by: division abolished

Chairman of the Illinois Board of Public Welfare Commissioners
- In office August 1, 1945 – October 3, 1949
- Appointed by: Dwight H. Green
- Preceded by: John Nuven Jr.
- Succeeded by: Hermon D. Smith

Director of the Illinois Post War Planning Commission
- In office 1945–~1947
- Governor: Dwight H. Green

Illinois Director of Finance
- In office April 13, 1943 – August 1, 1945
- Governor: Dwight H. Green
- Preceded by: Samuel L. Workman (acting)
- Succeeded by: Mark Saunders
- In office January 1941 – January 13, 1943
- Governor: Dwight H. Green
- Preceded by: A. M. Carter
- Succeeded by: Samuel L. Workman (acting)

Member of the Illinois Public Aid Commission
- In office July 15, 1941 – January 13, 1943
- Appointed by: Dwight H. Green
- Preceded by: commission established

Personal details
- Born: April 26, 1888 Keosauqua, Iowa
- Died: September 14, 1960 (age 72) Chicago, Illinois
- Party: Republican
- Spouse: Helen Sunny
- Children: 5
- Parents: George J. McKibbin (father); Julia Baldwin (mother)
- Education: Iowa Wesleyan University; University of Chicago Law School (J.D.)
- Occupation: Lawyer, politician, government administrator, government adviser, campaign manager

George Baldwin McKibbin (1888–September 14, 1960) was an American lawyer, government official, and politician who held various appointed roles in the state government of Illinois, federal government of the United States, and the military government of Allied-occupied Germany between the early 1940s until his death in 1960. A Republican, and regarded to be a prominent Chicagoan, he also unsuccessfully ran several times as a candidate for elected offices in Chicago. He first ran unsuccessfully in the Republican primary for the 1930 Sanitary District of Chicago election. He was the Republican nominee for mayor of Chicago in 1943 and for Illinois's 2nd congressional district in 1956. He also served as a delegate to the Republican National Conventions held in 1952 and 1960, having been selected by a vote of fellow Republicans in his district of Illinois.

McKibbin was involved in the management of Republican presidential nominee Thomas E. Dewey's campaigns in both 1944 and 1948. In 1944, McKibbin was an assistant manager of Dewey's campaign and was tasked with leading its outreach to African-American voters. He proved to be a poor choice for this role, as (separate from the campaign) he had simultaneously led an effort in Chicago supporting continued local enforcement of anti-Black racially-restrictive housing covenants. Newspaper reports during the 1944 campaign brought McKibbin's support of covenants to light, which was detrimental to the campaign's African American voter outreach. In the final months before the 1948 election (after returning to the United States following a year of working in Allied-occupied Germany), McKibbin headed the Dewey campaign's Midwestern operations.

From 1953 until his death, McKibbin served on the Government Contract Committee, which was tasked with making anti-discrimination clauses in government contracts more effective. This resulted in him earning positive regard among many African Americans, despite his previous support of housing discrimination in the 1940s. He also served on the executive board of numerous civic organizations and institutions, including spending decades on the board of trustees for his undergraduate alma mater, Iowa Wesleyan University.

== Early life and education ==
Was born on April 26, 1888, in Keosauqua, Iowa. He was the only child of George J. McKibbin and Julia Baldwin McKibbin. Shortly before, his seventh birthday, his father died. His mother was a writer and educator.

McKibbin attended and graduated from Iowa Wesleyan University, beginning his attendance in 1905 and graduating in 1909. While attending, he was the editor of the Wesleyan News student newspaper from 1907 to 1908. He was also the vice president of the State Oratorical Association and a member of the Beta Theta Pi fraternity. He attended the University of Iowa Law School, and completed his JD. degree at the University of Chicago Law School in 1913.

== Law career ==
McKibbin was admitted to the bar in 1913. He stayed in Chicago, Illinois, and practiced law there. He served on the board of managers of the Chicago Bar Association.

From 1920 to 1926, he was law partners with James W. Good. In 1926, McKibbin began a legal partnership with former state senator Thurlow Essington which would endure for decades.

== 1930 Chicago Sanitary District candidacy ==
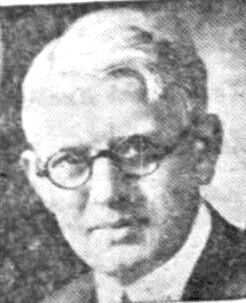
Portrait of McKibbin, circa 1930

Around the time he started his career as a lawyer, McKibbin became involved in Republican politics. In 1930, McKibbin ran for election to the Chicago Sanitary District Board, running in the Republican primary. He was included on a slate put forward by U.S. Senator Charles S. Deneen. A competing slate was put forward by Sanitary Board President H.W. Elmore. Hailing from the South Side of Chicago, McKibbin was the only individual supported for by Deneen for nomination who was not from a neighborhood or suburb to the north of the Chicago River. McKibbin was unsuccessful in the primary.

== 1940s politics and government ==
In 1940, McKibbin chaired the lawyer's committee for the Illinois gubernatorial campaign of Republican Dwight H. Green during both primary and general elections. McKibbin was close friends with Green. Green was elected, and McKibbin served in his gubernatorial administration.

=== First tenure as Illinois Director of Finance (1941–43) ===
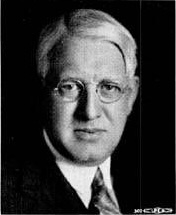
Official State of Illinois portrait, 1941

In early January 1941, McKibbin was appointed by Green to serve as the Illinois director of finance, and was soon after confirmed by the state senate. He was one of a few cabinet appointees of Green's to hail from Cook County, with the vast majority appointed by Green being from "downstate" of Cook County. Was appointed to succeed A. M. Carter.

On July 15, 1941 (early into his tenure as state finance director) Green additionally named McKibbin to serve a two-year term on the newly created Illinois Public Aid Commission (which served as a replacement to the former Illinois Emergency Relief commission).

On January 13, 1943, McKibbin resigned from state office in order to run for mayor of Chicago, and Samuel L. Workman (a political ally of his) served as acting director of finance thereafter. Before tendering his resignation and launching his mayoral candidacy, he had secured an assurance from the governor that he approved of McKibbin doing so.

=== 1943 Chicago mayoral candidacy ===
After a meeting with leaders of the Illinois Republican Party and the Cook County Republican Party, McKibbin announced on January 12, 1943, that he would run for mayor of Chicago. Originally, Roger Faherty (a conservative Republican) was seeking the nomination. The Cook County Republican Party had initially endorsed Faherty for the nomination. However, Faherty lost their confidence by demonstrating himself to be a poor campaigner. In January, leaders of the Illinois Republican Party and Cook County Republican Party persuaded McKibbin to run and persuaded Faherty to drop out of the race and support McKibbin. McKibbin's entry into the race, his support from the county party's leadership, and Faherty's intent to withdraw in support of McKibbin was all announced at the same time. McKibbin was, by the time of his mayoral candidacy, regarded to be a prominent Chicagoan.

In the last days before the primary, fellow candidate Arthur F. Albert and McKibbin's campaign exchanged heated criticisms. Albert regularly attacked McKibbin in radio attack advertisements which castigated McKibbin and Governor Green (who very actively campaigned in support of McKibbin's candidacy) as "bipartisan" (the term being used as a negative). The advertisements also made negative implications about McKibbin's positions on the city's traction issue. McKibbin ultimately secured the Republican nomination with a heavy victory in the primary, advancing to a general election against incumbent mayor Edward Joseph Kelly (a Democrat).

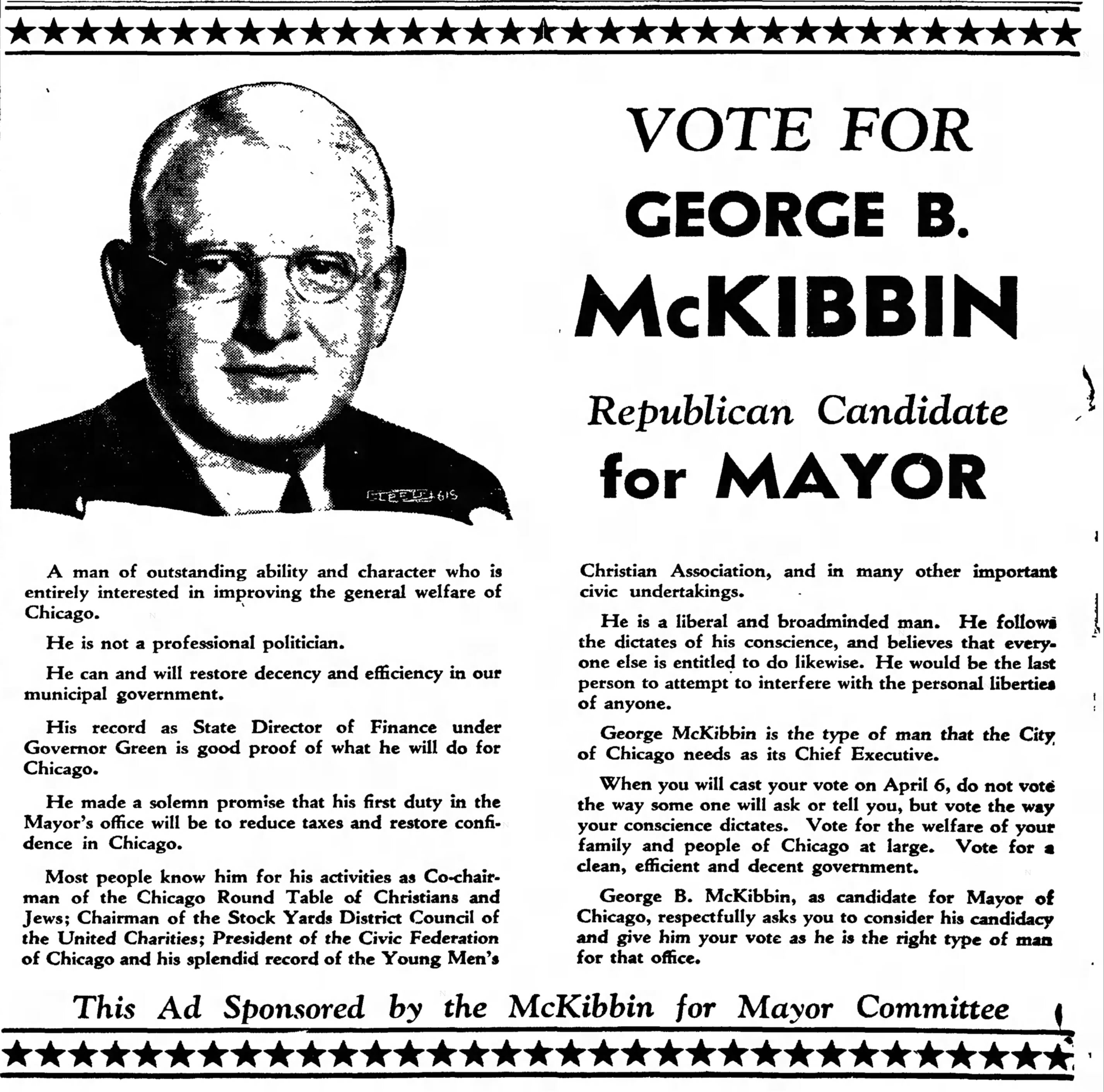
Newspaper advertisement for McKibbin's mayoral campaign

Like other Republicans that had run against Kelly, McKibbin framed his campaign as a crusade against machine politics. McKibbin declared,

Pendergast is out in K.C., Hague in Jersey, and Tammany in New York have been cleaned out. Now it is time to clean out the Kelly-Nash machine.

McKibbin and Governor Green accused Kelly's mayoral administration of having ties to criminal gangs and providing them protection from prosecution. After Republican city treasurer nominee Morgan L. Fitch was escorted into a police station by several Black men ("kidnapped" –as he put it– by men who he alleged might be city police officers), city Republicans including McKibbin accused Kelly and Democrats of electoral violence. Officials from the police station he was brought to recounted that several citizens had escorted Fitch and others into the office under citizen's arrest out of concern that they were distributing literature that could incite a race riot.

Democratic detractors alleged that McKibbin had signed his name to a covenant prohibiting Black tenants from occupying housing.

McKibbin was defeated by Kelly by a margin of more than 115,000 votes, with McKibbin winning 45% of the vote to Kelly's 55%.

While McKibbin lost by a sizable margin, his and other city elections were regarded by Chicago Tribune reporters as demonstrating an increase in Republican support and a significant loss of strength for the Kelly–Nash Machine (the Democratic political machine headed by Mayor Kelly and Patrick Nash). Due to Democratic strength in Chicago at the time, the 1941 result was considered relatively close. McKibbin outperformed Kelly in nineteen of the city's fifty wards. He performed strongly in former Republican strongholds on the city's south and north sides, but trailed Kelly on the city's west si de and other areas where the Cook County Democratic Party organization was most strongly organized. McKibbin outperformed Kelly in six of the city's north side wards. McKibbin was particularly strong in most of the lakefront-bordering wards (stretching from Lincoln Park up to the city's northern border with Evanston), winning most and narrowly trailing Kelly in the Uptown-area's 43rd and 48th wards. McKibbin also performed strongly in the South Side's Hyde Park, Englewood, and Beverly Hills neighborhoods. Among the South Side wards where McKibbin outperformed Kelly was the 4th ward, in which McKibbin resided. McKibbin also narrowly outperformed Kelly in the 18th ward, notably the home ward of Thomas J. Courtney (the Cook County state's attorney). McKibbin, however, only won eight of the nineteen total wards on the city's south side, due to Kelly's strong performance elsewhere on that side of the city. McKibbin trailed behind Kelly in the 1st ward (at the time considered the "richest ward in the world"), as well as the African-American heavy 2nd and 3rd wards. McKibbin also trailed Kelly in the Lake Calumet-area industrial region. While McKibbin trailed Kelly in much of the West side, he did manage to perform strongly in a few West Side wards. McKibbin outperformed Kelly in the 36th, 37th, 38th, 39th, and 41st ward, which were all wards that Governor Green had outperformed Kelly in when he ran for mayor four years earlier. The 37th ward included the Austin neighborhood. McKibbin additionally outperformed Kelly in the 47th ward, where he received his highest vote total. The West Side's 33rd ward (the home ward of Clayton F. Smith, the County Board president) saw McKibbin only narrowly trail Kelly's total in a near-tie.

In the coinciding runoff elections for Chicago City Council, Republican gains were made. While they were officially non-partisan races, each of the nine runoff elections had a Democratic-endorsed candidate and a Republican–endorsed candidate. Seven of the nine runoff candidates endorsed by the Republican Party were elected. This included three Republican challengers who unseated incumbent Democratic aldermen (including Oscar De Priest, who unseated Benjamin A. Grant in the 3rd ward; James B. Waller who unseated Paddy Bauler in the 43rd ward; and Theron W. Merryman, who unseated Edwin F. Meyer in the 45th ward). This result increased the number of Republican-affiliated aldermen on the City Council from five to nine. Two of the Republican-backed victors were previously Democrats who had lost the support of the Kelly–Nash Machine.

=== Second tenure as Illinois Director of Finance (1943–45) ===
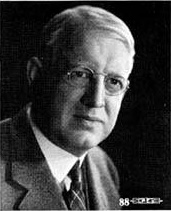
Official State of Illinois portrait, circa 1943

Having lost his campaign for mayor, after a three-month absence McKibbin was re-appointed to the post of Illinois director of finance by Governor Green. His appointment was announced by Governor Green on April 8, 1943. He re-assumed his position on April 13 after being confirmed by a vote of the Illinois Senate.

In August 1943, McKibbin was a main advocate for legislation that would remove from the role of administrating government aid specific to child dependents and old age pensioners from state welfare department and instead assign it to the Illinois Public Aid Commission. At the time, the Public Aid Commission's only purview was unemployment aid.

McKibbin also served as the "State Coal Conservator", a role that focused on efforts to conserve the resource of coal amid World War II. In this capacity, in early 1945 expressing concern over increased wartime demand for coal and "unusually" cold weather in Illinois, he urged state residents to lower the temperature to which they heated their homes in order to decrease consumption of coal. He additionally served as chairman of the public works committee, in which role he was involved in the planning of post-war public works projects.

McKibbin resigned as finance director on August 1, 1945, and Mark Saunders was appointed as his successor. In tendering his resignation, McKibbin cited his desire to spend more time in Chicago, and his belief that that would in incompatible with the demands of the office which he believed necessitated its administrator do their job from the agency headquarters in Springfield, Illinois.

=== Assistant campaign manager of the 1944 Dewey presidential campaign and controversial activism in support of anti-Black racially restrictive covenants ===
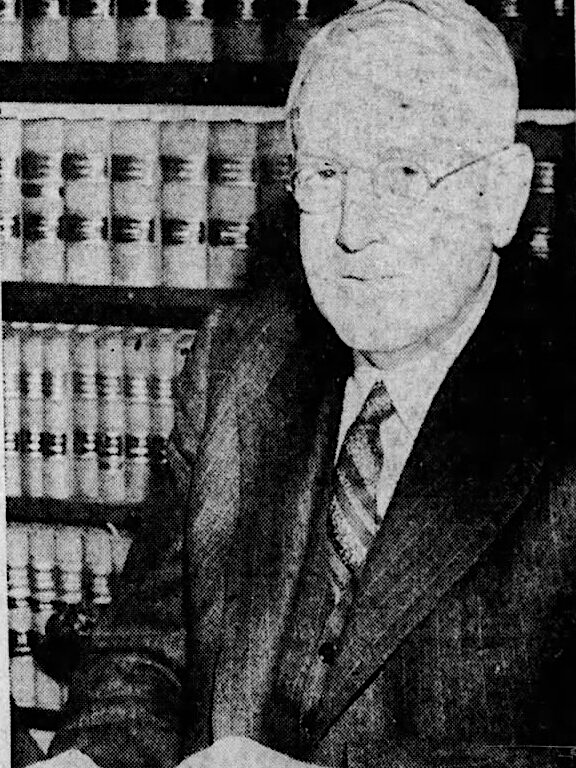
McKibbin, circa 1944

McKibbin served as assistant campaign manager for Thomas E. Dewey's campaign as the Republican nominee in the 1944 United States presidential election.

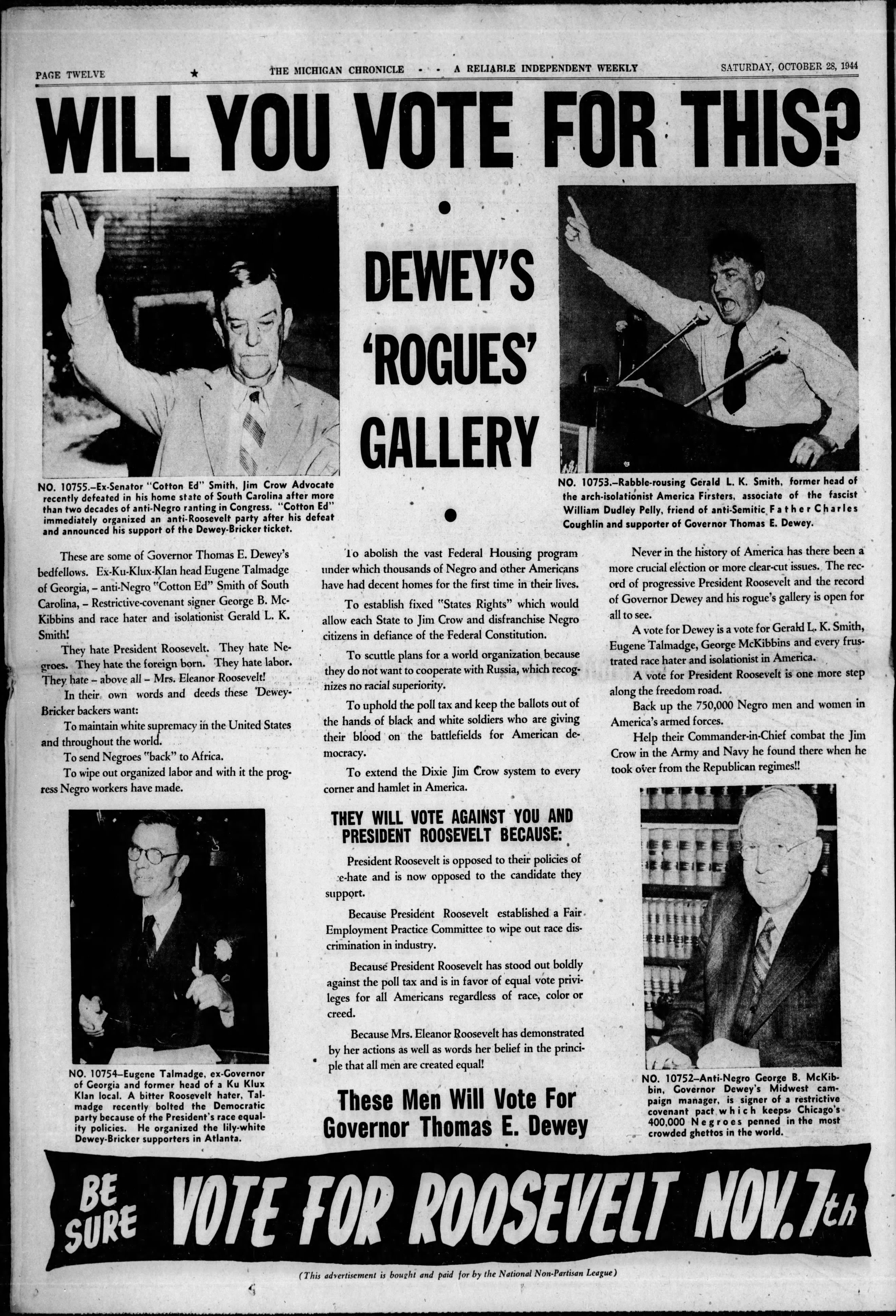
Full-page newspaper attack ad against Dewey run by the National Non-Partisan League, which names McKibbin as an "anti-[black]" Dewey supporter due to McKibbin's support of restrictive covenants

Despite existing allegations of McKibbin's involvement with racially restrictive covenants, he was tasked with overseeing the campaign's strategy for outreach to African American voters. He had been given this duty by campaign without any prior consultation with leading African American figures in the Republican Party as to his suitability for it. This worsened in early October when McKibbin attached his name to an effort funded by white Chicago realtors to rally the public in support of continued enforcement of anti-Black racially-restrictive covenants preventing Black people from moving into housing in South Side neighborhoods of Chicago such as Kenwood and Oakland. It was reported that McKibbin and Leonard Reed (incidentally, a cousin of Dewey) were leading organizers of this effort, which distributed racist circulars to residents. McKibbin's stance on covenants was damaging to Dewey's standing among African Americans, and was perhaps a contributing factor to Dewey's losses in numerous non-Jim Crow states in which African-Americans had voting power. The National Non-Partisan League mentioned it later that month in a full-page attack ad against Dewey that it published in newspapers such as The Michigan Chronicle arguing that voters should vote to re-elect Franklin D. Roosevelt because numerous racists and antisemites supported Dewey and opposed Roosevelt (citing McKibbin as an example alongside Ellison D. Smith, Gerald L. K. Smith, and Eugene Talmadge). Roosevelt narrowly won Michigan over Dewey, with Michigan being the only state that flipped from Republican in the 1940 presidential election to Democratic in the 1944 presidential election.

In addition to having erred by placing McKibbin in charge of its overall African American outreach, the campaign had also erred in its selected of C.B. Powell to head its East Coast outreach to African Americans, as Powell proved inept at his job (being damagingly quoted as exclaiming to reporters on his very first day in the role that the Republican Party had done nothing beneficial for African Americans). These miscalculations contributed to Republican Party's continuing its loss of Black voters 1944 (a trend that was already occurring with the ushering-in of the Fifth Party System in the United States), and may have been a key factor in enough states to contribute to Dewey's ultimate loss to Roosevelt.

=== Chairman of the Illinois Board of Public Welfare Commissioners (1945–49) ===
On August 1, 1945, upon his resignation as state finance director McKibbin was immediately appointed by Green to serve as chairman of the Illinois Board of Public Welfare Commissioners, a was non-salaried advisory board to the Illinois Department of Welfare. McKibbin held this position until 1949. McKibbin and other board members remained as holdovers in the early months of the governorship of Adlai E. Stevenson II (a Democrat who took office in January 1949), but were ultimately replaced by Stevenson on October 3, 1949.

McKibbin's appointment top the board came alongside the appointment of new occupants the board's five non-chairman seats, fill a full-board vacancy that had arisen after the previous board membership had resigned en masse in June. Immediately, Green tasked McKibbin and the board with the assignment of developing a "practical" program for welfare in the state of Illinois to be developed in two months time and presented to the state legislature. While on the board, McKibbin also became the chairman of the Chicago Welfare Commission, a position he would hold for many years even subsequent to his departure from the state board. He also served as state fuel conservation director.

The board conducted a study for which recommended merging the Illinois Public Aid Commission and Illinois Department of Public Welfare, though this was not acted upon during Green's governorship.

==== Director of the Illinois Postwar Planning Commission (1945–47) ====
McKibbin was appointed to serve as director of Illinois' postwar planning commission in 1945.

In 1946, McKibbin was a chief proponent of the $139 million postwar construction plan which the commission would controlled the funds for, calling it "well-rounded and a great benefit to all of Illinois". He testified before the state legislature in support of it. In October 1946, the commission spent $6 million to purchase the Burnham Building in Chicago. The state had previously allowed a conditional 30-day option to purchase it for $4.85 million lapse early the previous year. The price spent to purchase the building attracted some criticism, with the Commission not having had the building formally appraised prior to purchase. McKibbin defended this decision, stating that the commission lacked the $10,000 that would be needed for an appraisal, and that they had acted on pro bono advice provided by competent real estate brokers.

In approximately 1947, McKibbin left the position.

=== Positions in the military government of Allied–occupied Germany (1947–48) ===
In June 1947, it was announced that McKibbin would be appointed by President Harry S. Truman and Secretary of War Robert P. Patterson to succeed Dwight Griswold as a director of the internal affairs and communications division of the Allied Control Council in Allied-occupied Germany (a component of the Allied Military Government of Occupied Territories). He had been Griswold's personal recommendation for his successor. He worked in Germany from July 1, 1947, through July 1, 1948. On February 10, 1948, his role in Germany was changed from director of internal affairs and communications, with McKibbin being reassigned to serve as the governmental affairs advisor to Lucius D. Clay. This came alongside the announcement that the AMG's Internal Affairs and Communications Division would be folded and its functions would be transferred to the Civil Affairs Division.

McKibbin aided Clay in setting-up the independent West German government. Additionally, Clay's request he set up brother organizations in Germany similar to brotherhood cause he was involved in organizing in the United States for the National Conference of Christians and Jews (a group whose board he served on).

McKibbin took a year's absence from his Chicago law firm in order work in Germany. His wife accompanied him to Germany.

=== Head of Midwestern operations for the 1948 Dewey presidential campaign ===
After returning from Europe, McKibbin headed the Midwestern operations in the last months of Dewey's 1948 presidential campaign.

== 1950s politics and government ==
McKibbin was a delegate to the 1952 Republican National Convention. Ahead of the convention vote, he agreed (at Everett Dirksen's urging) to support Robert A. Taft on the first ballot, but gave no commitment on voting for Taft in any subsequent ballots. McKibbin disclosed ahead of the convention that was amenable to a prospective nomination of Taft or Dwight D. Eisenhower, but that he was against nominating Douglas MacArthur. In accordance with his pledge to Dirksen, McKibbin cast his vote for Taft on the fist ballot. After Eisenhower surprised many by capturing the nomination on the first ballot, McKibbin made an inquiry into whether he could have his vote officially shifted to Eisenhower. However, both Dirkson and William G. Stratton (chairman and vice chairman of the Illinois delegation to the convention, respectively) shot this down, arguing that the state delegation would appear undignified in asking to amend its vote tally. Eisenhower went on to win the general election.

=== Part-time consultant to the General Services Administration and representative on the Government Contract Committee (1953–60) ===
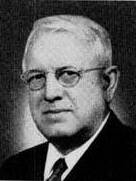
Official State of Illinois portrait, circa 1957

On October 1, 1953, McKibbin was appointed by GSA Administrator Edmund F. Mansure to represent the GSA on the Government Contract Committee. The committee (established by Executive Order 10479, and chaired by Vice President Richard Nixon) was tasked with increasing the effectiveness of anti-discrimination clauses included in government contracts. He would serve on this committee uninterrupted until his death in 1960. At the same time that Mansure appointed McKibbin to the committee, he also announced that McKibbin would serve as a part-time consultant to him at the GSA. Similarly, McKibbin also worked as a GSA consultant into the year 1960.

=== Chairman of the Illinois Public Aid Commission (1953–1960) ===
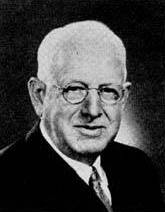
Official State of Illinois portrait, 1959

On April 1, 1953, Republican Illinois Governor William G. Stratton appointed McKibbin and Stuyvesant Peabody to serve on the Illinois Public Aid Commission, replacing Simeon P. Lelkand and Samuel J. Bradfield. He became the commission's chairman after being appointed to it, and held the chairmanship until his death in 1960. He was re-appointed by Stratton to the commission in January 1955.

=== 1956 congressional candidacy ===
In 1956, McKibbin was the Republican nominee in Illinois's 2nd congressional district: facing incumbent Democrat Barratt O'Hara. The congressional district was located on the south side of Chicago, including the University of Chicago's campus. It contained the entirety of the boundaries at the time of Chicago's 5th, 7th, and 8th wards, as well as the northern ten vote precincts in that era's borders of Chicago's 10th ward.

Honorary chairmen of McKibbin's campaign included Samuel B. Fuller, Golden B. Darby, and Maureen Williams. Newspaper columnist George W. Crane headed a citizen's committee organized in support of McKibbin's campaign. Other notable members included Maxwell Abbell, Charles F. Axelson, and Charles A. Bane. President Eisenhower gave his personal endorsement to McKibbin's candidacy in an open letter on August 15. McKibbin also received endorsements from affiliate unions of the Congress of Industrial Organizations as well as the ADA-Independent Voters of Illinois who provided funding and volunteers to aid his campaign.

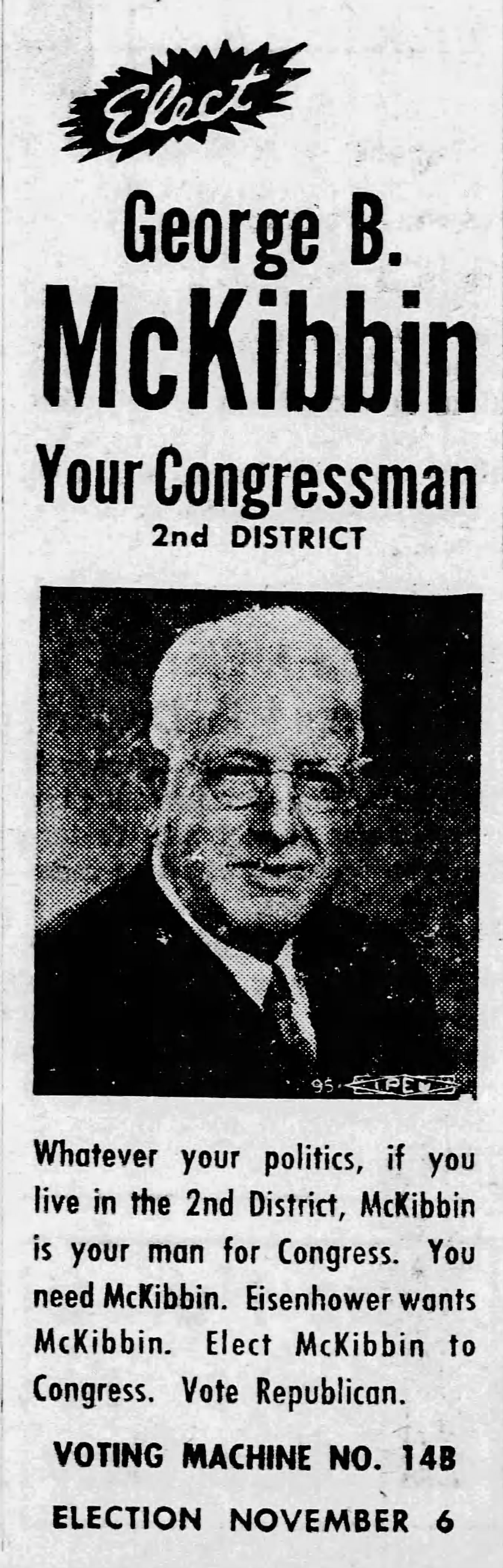
Newspaper advertisement for McKibbin's congressional campaign

Having been unopposed for his party's nomination, McKibbin's campaign for the general election was officially launched in mid-September with the opening of his campaign headquarters.

McKibbin enjoyed strong name recognition, with the Chicago Tribune referring to him as being, "one of the most prominent Chicagoans". McKibbin's work on the Government Contract Committee was regarded to have positioned him to receive strong support from Black voters appreciative of the work he had done. He was especially seen as poised to benefit from this because of the expectation that the district's Black voters would be disenchanted with the Democratic party, given that William L. Dawson of the adjacent 1st congressional district had joined with Southern Democrats' positions during debate on civil rights. McKibbin received endorsements from the Chicago Tribune, Chicago Sun-Times, Chicago Daily News, and the Chicago American.

Despite Eisenhower winning a strong re-election in the coinciding presidential election (both nationally and in Illinois), O'Hara won an easy victory and defeated McKibbin 55.3% to 44.7%.

== Leadership of civic organizations and institutions ==
McKibbin joined the Iowa Wesleyan board of trustees in 1919. He would be a member of the board for many decades. He served as board president in the late 1930s. He also later served for some time as the board vice president. As a trustee, McKibbin was involved in fundraising campaigns for Wesleyan. In 1951, as a board trustee was able to personally confer a diploma to his son James, who was graduating with a bachelor of art.

For more than two decades (before entering state government in 1941), McKibbin was a trustee of the Civic Federation of Chicago and the Bureau of Public Efficiency. He was the Civic Federation of Chicago's board president in 1936. In 1937 and 1938, he was president of the board of directors of the Cook County School of Nursing.

McKibbin was a member of national YMCA council, In 1932, he served as president of the Chicago YMCA organization. He subsequently served a director of the Chicago organization. He was also on the board of the Council of State Governments.

McKibbin was involved in the National Conference of Christians and Jews, and served on its board of governors.

In 1949, McKibbin traveled around Europe on a tour as a representative of the National Conference of Christians and Jews. His wife accompanied him on this and other travels for the organization. He met with President Eisenhower on behalf of the organization. He served as the chairman of National Brotherhood Week in 1959, a large event that was sponsored by the group.

McKibbin was also a member of the executive committee of World Brotherhood Inc. and the general assembly of the International World Brotherhood Organization.

McKibbin served as the chairman of the boards of trustees for Chicago's St. James Methodist Church, the Chicago chapter of the Urban League, and the Chicago Wesley Memorial Hospital. In the mid-1950s, he served as the recording secretary of the executive council on world service and finance of the Methodist Church.

== Personal life and death ==
On November 11, 1916, McKibbin married Helen Sunny in Chicago. Together, they had five children (three daughters and two sons).

In February 1946, while McKibbin and his wife were vacationing in Tucson, Arizona, their then-sixteen-year-old daughter Mary Ellen survived a violent crime against her. Mary Ellen was attacked in an alleyway on Chicago's south side and was then forced at gunpoint into a car by a man who then proceeded to rape her. Because Mary Ellen had been drinking with a friend earlier that evening at several bars, police not only investigated the sexual crime against her but also arrested several bar owners under charges of selling liquor to a minor. A United Press wire story on the crime was carried nationally.

McKibben died on September 14, 1960, at the age of 72 of an apparent heart attack while at his law office. McKibbin had arrived at his law office before any other employees that day, and his body found by others after he had already died. He was survived by his wife Helen, as well as their three daughters and two sons.

== Honors ==
In 1937, while he was serving as president of its board of trustees, Iowa Wesleyan University gave McKibbin an honorary doctor of law degree.

At a luncheon held on November 4, 1955, at Chicago's Conrad Hilton Hotel, McKibbin and former alderman Archibald Carey Jr. were made knights commander of the Liberian Humane Order of African Redemption, with this honor being presented to them by Ambassador from Liberia Clarence Lorenzo Simpson in recognition of their contributions towards fostering positive Liberia–United States relations.

Iowa Wesleyan University named a residence hall for McKibbin (George B. McKibbin Hall, a three-story 200 resident men's residence hall which was constructed in the fall of 1966). The building remained a men's residence into the university's later years of operation.

== Electoral history ==
=== Chicago Sanitary District ===
1930 Chicago Sanitary District Republican primary (for regular election of 3 trustees)
Party	Candidate	Votes	%
Republican	William G. Tegtmeir	250,537	19.51
Republican	Joshua D. D'Esposito	169,727	13.21
Republican	____ Sullivan	167,891	13.07
Republican	George McKibbin	124,647	9.70
Republican	Fletcher M. Durbin	114,273	8.90
Republican	Walter T. Quigley	108,654	8.46
Republican	Frank J. Bilek	99,978	7.78
Republican	____ Hensen	51,793	4.03
Republican	Frank Trautman	43,790	3.41
Republican	____ Healy	32,304	2.51
Republican	_____ Crammer Jr.	32,168	2.50
Republican	____ Sager	31,379	2.44
Republican	Michael J. Murphy	28,187	2.19
Republican	Charles H. Serum	15,130	1.18
Republican	____ Mongreig	13,998	1.09

=== Mayor of Chicago ===
1943 Chicago Republican mayoral primary
Party	Candidate	Votes	%
Republican	George B. McKibbin	318,166	76.27
Republican	Arthur F. Albert	80,868	19.39
Republican	John Homer Lyle	18,136	4.35
Total votes		417,170	100

1943 Chicago mayoral general election
Party	Candidate	Votes	%
Democratic	Edward J. Kelly (incumbent)	685,567	54.54
Republican	George B. McKibbin	571,547	45.47
Total votes		1,257,114	100

=== U.S. House of Representatives ===
1956 Republican primary for Illinois's 2nd congressional district
Party	Candidate	Votes	%
Republican	George B. McKibbin	11,991	100
Total votes		11,991	100

1956 election in Illinois's 2nd congressional district
Party	Candidate	Votes	%
Democratic	Barratt O'Hara (incumbent)	86,386	55.28
Republican	George B. McKibbin	69,892	44.72
Total votes		156,279	100

=== Republican National Convention delegate ===
Election of 2 Illinois delegates from the 2nd district of Cook County to the 1952 Republican National Convention
Party	Candidate	Votes	%
Republican	George B. McKibbin	32,295	42.05
Republican	Oliver H. Bovik	23,471	42.05
Republican	Fred D. Hawkins	13,150	17.12
Republican	Saul A. Epton	7,887	10.27

Election of 2 Illinois delegates from the 2nd district of Cook County to the 1960 Republican National Convention
Party	Candidate	Votes	%
Republican	Thomas J. Downs	11,219	50.21
Republican	George McKibbin	11,123	49.78

Preceded by	Member of the Government Contract Committee representing the General Services Administration; 1953 – September 14, 1960	Succeeded by
Preceded by	Chairman of the Illinois Public Aid Commission; April 1953 – September 14, 1960	Succeeded by
Preceded by	Government affairs advisor to the military governor of the American occupation zone in Germany; February 10, 1948 – July 1, 1948	Succeeded by
Preceded by Dwight Griswold	Director of the Internal Affairs and Communications Division of the Allied Control Council; July 1, 1947 – July 1, 1948	Succeeded by division abolished
Preceded by John Nuveen Jr.	Chairman of the Illinois Board of Public Welfare Commissioners; August 1, 1945 – October 3, 1949	Succeeded by Hermon D. Smith
Preceded by	Director of the Illinois Post War Planning Commission; 1945 – ~1947	Succeeded by
Preceded by Samuel L. Workman (acting)	Illinois Director of Finance; April 13, 1943 – August 1, 1945	Succeeded by Mark Saunders
Preceded by commission established	Member of the Illinois Public Aid Commission; July 15, 1941 – January 13, 1943	Succeeded by
Preceded by A. M. Carter	Illinois Director of Finance; January 1941 – January 13, 1943	Succeeded by Samuel L. Workman (acting)
Party political offices
Preceded by Richard B. Vail	Republican nominee for Illinois's 2nd congressional district 1956	Succeeded by Harold E. Marks
Preceded by Dwight H. Green	Republican nominee for mayor of Chicago; 1943	Succeeded by Russell Root
Preceded by	Delegate to the Republican National Convention from the 2nd district of Cook County, Illinois; 1952, 1960	Succeeded by
