= 1943 Chicago mayoral election =

- April 6, 1943
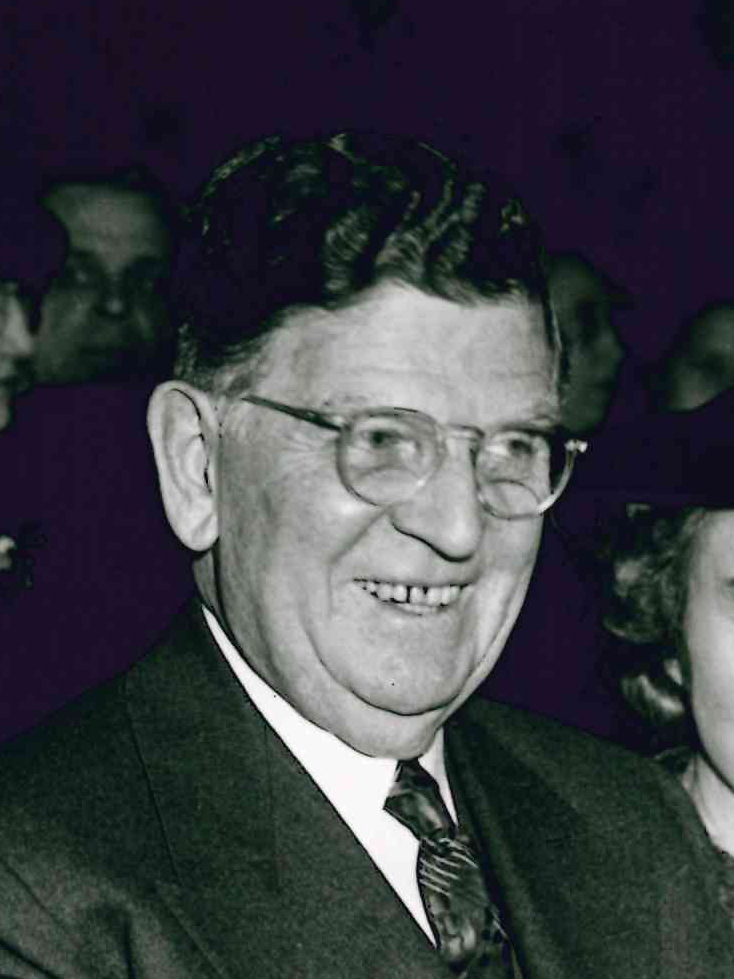

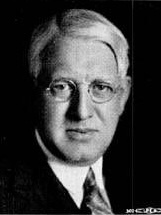
Nominee	Edward J. Kelly	George B. McKibbin
Party	Democratic	Republican
Popular vote	685,567	571,547
Percentage	54.54%	45.47%
Mayor before election
Edward J. Kelly
Democratic
Elected Mayor
Edward J. Kelly
Democratic

The Chicago mayoral election of 1943 was held on April 6, 1943. The election saw incumbent Edward J. Kelly being reelected to a third term, defeating Republican nominee George B. McKibbin with a 9% margin of victory. Both nominees had received landslide victories in their party's primary elections.

The election was preceded by primary elections held on February 23, 1943, to determine the nominees of both the Democratic Party and the Republican Party.

== Democratic primary ==
On January 13, incumbent mayor Edward J. Kelly officially confirmed that he would seek re-election. Kelly had served as mayor since 1933. Alongside Patrick Nash, Kelly headed the Kelly–Nash Machine, a political machine which The Associated Press contemporarily described as "one of the most efficient political organizations in the country."

Reform-oriented Democrats supported Kelly's challenger, John S. Boyle (a Democratic member of the Chicago City Council, regarded to be independent from Kelly's political machine). Kelly was additionally challenged by Billy Patts, a political noephyte.

Having strong organized support behind his candidacy (by virtue of his political machine), Kelly was widely anticipated win renomination over his two opponents.

Overall turnout in the Democratic and Republican primaries (both held on February 23) was regarded to be light (for the era). The city had 1,784,324 registered voters at the time of the primaries, with the 972,274 combined votes cast for mayor in the two primaries amounting to participation from 54.49% of the city registered electorate. For comparison, in the preceding (1939) election 962,139 voters had participated in the Democratic mayoral primary alone (with the 274,317 Republican primary votes in bringing cumulative mayoral primary votes to 1,236,456 that year).

After his victory in the primary, Kelly delivered remarks which emphasized the "leading role" he argued Chicago was playing in the United States' efforts in World War II. He touted wartime economic growth in the city, including job growth and the opening of new factories.

Chicago Democratic mayoral primary
Party	Candidate	Votes	%
Democratic	Edward J. Kelly (incumbent)	438,546	79.00
Democratic	John S. Boyle	82,836	14.92
Democratic	Billy Patts	33,722	6.08
Turnout		555,104	

== Republican primary ==
=== Candidates ===
Ran

- George B. McKibbin, former Illinois director of finance
- Arthur F. Albert, former alderman on the Chicago City Council
- John Homer Lyle, former judge on the Municipal Court of Chicago

Withdrew

- Roger Faherty

=== Campaigning ===
Originally, Roger Faherty (a conservative Republican) was seeking the nomination. The Cook County Republican Party had initially endorsed Faherty for the nomination. However, Faherty lost their confidence by demonstrating himself to be a poor campaigner. In January, leaders of the Illinois Republican Party and Cook County Republican Party persuaded McKibbin to run and Faherty to drop out of the race and support McKibbin. McKibbin's entry into the race and Faherty's intent to withdraw in support of McKibbin was announced on January 12. McKibbin was a political ally of Governor Dwight H. Green, who played an active role in McKibbin's campaign. While he had the backing of the "regular organization" of the county party, McKibbin still faced two opponents in the primary election.

In the last days before the primary, fellow candidate Arthur F. Albert and McKibbin's campaign exchanged heated criticisms. Albert regularly attacked McKibbin in radio attack advertisements which castigated McKibbin and Governor Green as being "bipartisan" (the term being used as a negative). The advertisements also made negative implications about McKibbin's position on the traction issue. The barrage of attack ads from Albert led Samuel L. Workman (acting state director of finance and a supporter of McKibbin) to criticize Albert and question who was providing the funds for Albert's radio airtime. Workman implied that Albert was perhaps "the one who is really playing the bipartisan game" and was campaigning at the behest of Mayor Kelly. Workman suggested that since Albert's x ray company did business with the Democratic-led county government, it was conceivable that he would be political bedfellows with Kelly as well and that the money for Albert's radio advertisements had come from Kelly. Workman also alleged that

McKibbin won the Republican nomination by a landslide margin.

=== Results ===
Chicago Republican mayoral primary (February 23, 1943)
Party	Candidate	Votes	%
Republican	George B. McKibbin	318,166	76.27
Republican	Arthur F. Albert	80,868	19.39
Republican	John Homer Lyle	18,136	4.35
Turnout		417,170	

== General election ==
=== Campaigning ===
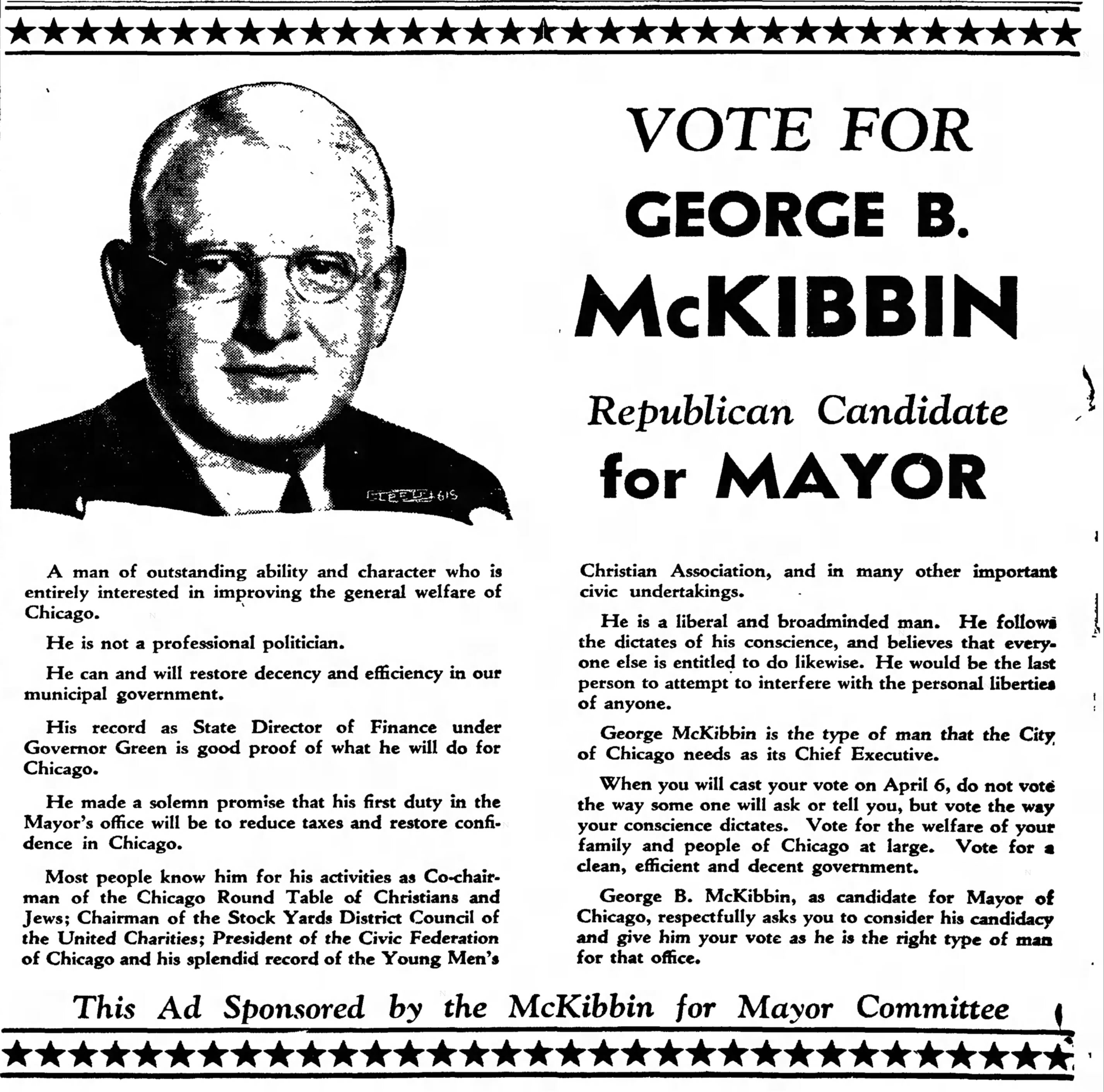
Newspaper advertisement for McKibbin's mayoral campaign

Kelly did not actively campaign. Confident in his chances of victory, Kelly flaunted heavy gravitas and balked at the thought of campaigning. McKibbin and his campaign accused the Kelly–Nash Machine of having links with criminal activity. Like other Republicans that had run against Kelly, McKibbin framed his campaign as a crusade against machine politics. declaring,

Pendergast is out in K.C., Hague in Jersey, and Tammany in New York have been cleaned out. Now it is time to clean out the Kelly–Nash Machine.

McKibbin and Governor Green (while campaigning for McKibbin) accused Kelly's mayoral administration of having ties to criminal gangs and of providing gangs protection from prosecution. After Republican city treasurer nominee Morgan L. Fitch was escorted into a police station by several Black men ("kidnapped" –as he put it– by men who he alleged might be city police officers), city Republicans including McKibbin accused Kelly and Democrats of electoral violence. Officials from the police station he was brought to recounted that several citizens had escorted Fitch and others into the office under citizen's arrest out of concern that they were distributing literature that could incite a race riot.

Democratic Party detractors alleged that McKibbin had signed his name to a covenant prohibiting Black tenants from occupying housing.

=== Results ===
Voter turnout was considered to be very light. Kelly won what was considered to be a very solid victory. However, despite Kelly winning by a sizable margin, the mayoral election coinciding aldermanic elections were regarded by Chicago Tribune reporters as demonstrating an increase in Republican support and a significant loss of strength for the Kelly–Nash Machine.

Kelly performed strongly on much of the city's West Side and in other areas where the Cook County Democratic Party organization was best-organized. However, while he led McKibbin on much of the West side, McKibbin did manage to outperform him in a few West Side wards. This included five wards which Governor Green had similarly outperformed Kelly in four years earlier: the 36th, 37th, 38th, 39th, and 41st wards. The 37th ward included the Austin neighborhood. Additionally, McKibbin outperformed Kelly in the 47th ward, where he received his highest vote total. Furthermore, while Kelly carried the West Side's 33rd ward (home ward of Clayton F. Smith, the County Board president), it was by a very narrow margin with the two candidates nearly tying in their vote totals there.

McKibbin outperformed Kelly in nineteen of the city's fifty wards. He performed strongly in former Republican strongholds on the city's South and North sides. In 1979, an academic journal article by Peter Colby and Paul Michael Green retrospectively observed, "The 1943 Kelly-George B. McKibbin race was a close contest...remaining Republican strength was still holding on the perimeter of Chicago." McKibbin outperformed Kelly in six of the city's north side wards. McKibbin saw particularly strong results in most of the lakefront-bordering wards (stretching from Lincoln Park up to the city's northern border with Evanston), winning most and narrowly trailing Kelly in the Uptown-area's 43rd and 48th wards. He also performed strongly against Kelly in the South Side's Hyde Park, Englewood, and Beverly Hills neighborhoods. Among the South Side wards where McKibbin outperformed Kelly was the 4th ward, in which McKibbin resided. McKibbin also narrowly outperformed Kelly in the 18th ward, notably the home ward of Thomas J. Courtney (the Cook County state's attorney). Still, however, Kelly outperformed McKibbin in eleven of the nineteen wards on the city's south side, with Kelly performing strongly elsewhere on that side of the city. On the South Side, Kelly outperformed McKibbin in the 1st ward (at the time considered the "richest ward in the world"), as well as the African-American heavy 2nd and 3rd ward wards. Kelly also outperformed McKibbin in the Lake Calumet-area industrial region.

In the coinciding runoff elections for Chicago City Council, the Republican Party saw gains. While the runoffs were officially non-partisan races. However, each of the nine runoffs had a Democratic-endorsed candidate and a Republican–endorsed candidate. Seven of the nine runoff candidates endorsed by the Republican Party were elected, with the Republican-backed candidates in the remaining two runoffs narrowly trailing their Democratic-backed opponents. Victorious Republican backed aldermanic candidates included three Republican challengers who unseated incumbent Democratic aldermen (including Oscar De Priest, who unseated Benjamin A. Grant in the 3rd ward; James B. Waller who unseated Paddy Bauler in the 43rd ward; and Theron W. Merryman, who unseated Edwin F. Meyer in the 45th ward). This result increased the number of Republican-affiliated aldermen on the City Council from five to nine. Two of the Republican-backed victors were former Democrats who had lost the support of the Kelly–Nash Machine.

Mayor of Chicago 1943 election (General Election)
Party	Candidate	Votes	%
Democratic	Edward J. Kelly (incumbent)	685,567	54.54
Republican	George B. McKibbin	571,547	45.47
Turnout		1,257,114	
