= Bauler =

Bauler may refer to:

== People ==
- Harry Bauler (1910–1962), American politician
- John Bauler, alderman of the 22nd ward of Chicago (1912–1920), brother of Paddy Bauler
- Paddy Bauler (1890–1977), corrupt Chicago politician

== Places ==
- Bauler, Ahrweiler
- Bauler, Bitburg-Prüm
