= Iowa Wesleyan University =

Private university in Mount Pleasant, Iowa, US

Coordinates: 40°58′21″N 91°33′08″W

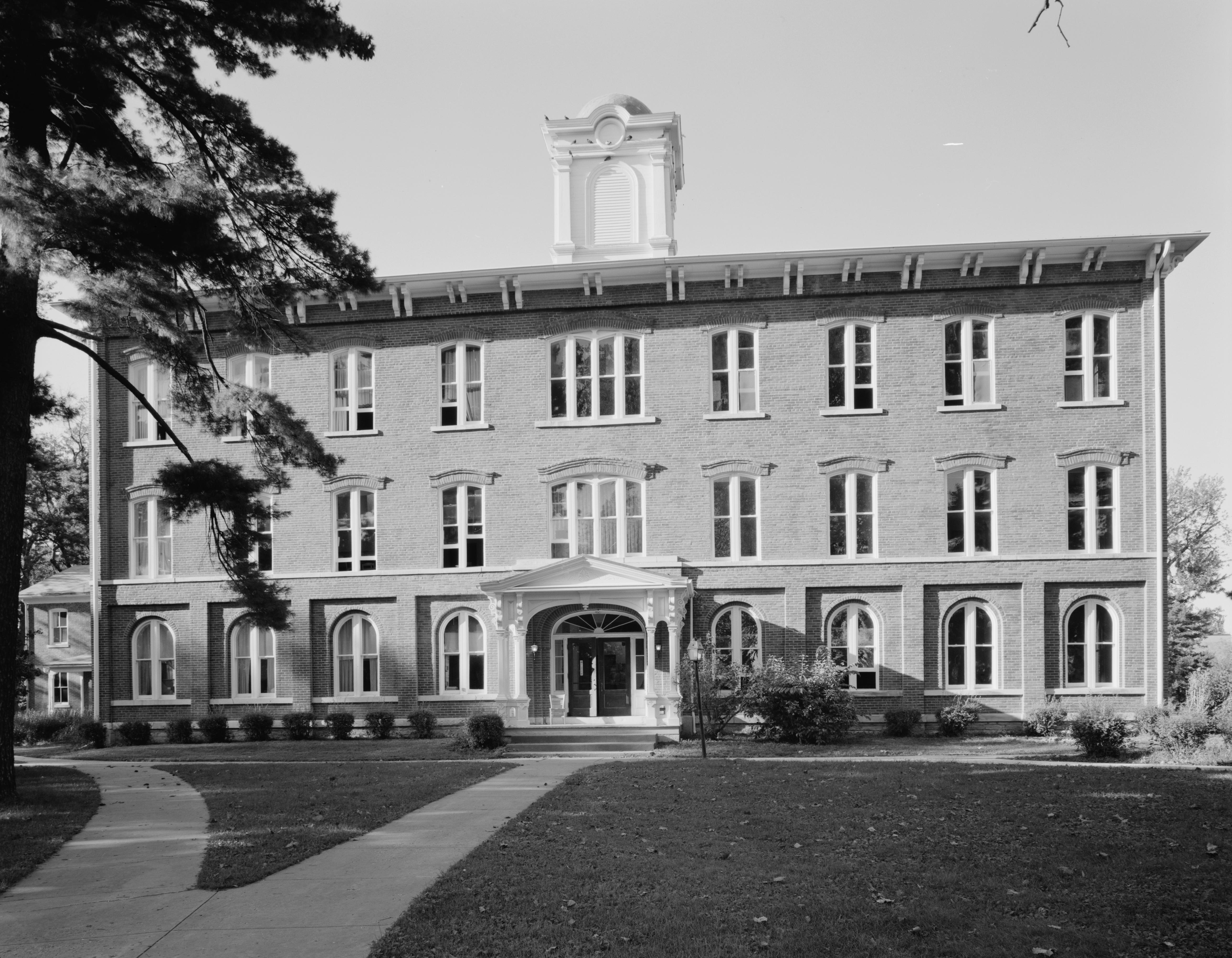
- "Old Main" on the Iowa Wesleyan campus
- Former names: Mount Pleasant Literary Institute (1842–1843); Mount Pleasant Collegiate Institute (1843–1855); Iowa Wesleyan College (1912–2015)
- Motto: Learning in Community: An Academic Vision
- Type: Private university
- Active: 1842–2023
- Religious affiliation: United Methodist Church
- Location: Mount Pleasant, Iowa, United States
- Campus: Rural
- Colors: Purple & White
- Nickname: Tigers
- Mascot: Wesley the Tiger

Iowa Wesleyan University was a private university in Mount Pleasant, Iowa, United States. It was Iowa's first coeducational institution of higher learning and the oldest of its type west of the Mississippi River. The institution was affiliated with the United Methodist Church. It closed at the end of the 2022–23 academic year due to financial challenges.

Two campus buildings, Old Main and the Harlan-Lincoln House, are listed on the National Register of Historic Places. The latter, the former summer home of Robert Todd Lincoln, is now a museum featuring artifacts from the Harlan and Lincoln families.

== History ==
In 1841 a group of Methodist settlers in Mount Pleasant, Iowa, met and began lobbying the Iowa territorial legislature to establish an institute of higher learning in their burgeoning community. On February 17, 1842, the legislature granted a charter for the Mount Pleasant Literary Institute, soon to be renamed as Mount Pleasant Collegiate Institute. Despite the charter, organization and fund raising were sluggish at first. Twenty acres of land was donated for the campus by four Mount Pleasant residents in March 1843. That same month, organizing officials hired Artistides J. Heustis as the institution's first president.

From February 1855, the school was known as Iowa Wesleyan University, honoring John Wesley, the founder of Methodism. The institution's name was modified to Iowa Wesleyan College in 1912, reflecting its contemporary status as a four-year baccalaureate degree institution. On August 10, 2015, Iowa Wesleyan College changed its name to Iowa Wesleyan University.

The university occupied a 60-acre (24 ha) central campus of historic red brick buildings and modern structures, including some listed on the National Register of Historic Places. The chapel, built in 1896, received a complete renovation and restoration in the early 21st century.

Iowa Wesleyan was accredited by the Higher Learning Commission.

=== Closure ===
Facing potential closure in 2018, the university was able to continue operating after receiving donations from alumni and a $26 million loan from the United States Department of Agriculture. In 2023, the university's board of trustees voted unanimously in favor of closure after Iowa Governor Kim Reynolds determined that a loan of $12 million would not be feasible. Once the university closed, the campus became the responsibility of the USDA. The Mount Pleasant Community School District later bought practice fields and the central part of the campus for about $1.2 million.

Undergraduate enrollment at the college was approximately 600 full-time students at the time of its closure. The final president of the university was Christine Plunkett, who was in office from 2019 to 2023.

== Student life ==
Beginning in late mid-1800s, Iowa Wesleyan maintained an active Military Department, in which students organized as a corps of cadets received training under the guidance of United States Army officers. Among Iowa Wesleyan's commandants were Ulysses G. McAlexander (1891 to 1895) and Charles L. Hodges (1895 to 1897).

== Greek life ==
Greek life was well established at Iowa Wesleyan. The Beta chapter of Alpha Xi Delta sorority was the oldest sorority on campus, being on campus since 1902. It was the oldest chapter of Alpha Xi Delta in the country. The P.E.O. Sisterhood was founded at Iowa Wesleyan University on January 21, 1869.

== Athletics ==
The Iowa Wesleyan athletic teams were nicknamed the Tigers. The university was a member of the National Association of Intercollegiate Athletics (NAIA), competing in the North Star Athletic Association (NSAA) for football, the Heart of America Athletic Conference (HAAC) for wrestling, and the Continental Athletic Conference as its primary home for all other sports as of the 2022–23 academic year.

Iowa Wesleyan competed in 16 intercollegiate varsity sports: Men's sports included baseball, basketball, cross country, football, golf, soccer, track & field and wrestling; while women's sports included basketball, cross country, golf, soccer, softball, track & field, volleyball and wrestling.

=== History ===
From 1989 to 1991, Hal Mumme was head football coach, with Mike Leach as his offensive coordinator. It was at Iowa Wesleyan that they developed the air raid offense.

In 2006, 2007, 2009, 2010, and 2011, the women's basketball teams qualified for the NAIA Division II national tournament.

In 2014, 2015 and 2016, the women's basketball teams qualified for the USCAA Division I national tournament. The 2016 team finished as the national runner-up.

In 2015 and 2017, the men's basketball teams qualified for the USCAA Division I national tournament.

In 2022 and 2023 the women's basketball team qualified for the NAIA single division national tournament.

In 2023, the men's basketball team qualified for the NAIA single division national tournament.

=== Conference affiliations ===
The Tigers were members of the following athletic organizations:

- 2021–2023 – Continental Athletic Conference (CAC) – North Star Athletic Association (NSAA) – NAIA
- 2017–2021 – St. Louis Intercollegiate Athletic Conference (SLIAC) – Upper Midwest Athletic Conference (UMAC) – NCAA Division III
- 2013–2017 – St. Louis Intercollegiate Athletic Conference (SLIAC) – National Collegiate Athletic Association (NCAA) Division III (provisional member while associated with the United States Collegiate Athletic Association (USCAA))
- 2012–2013 – Independent - NAIA
- 1995–2012 – Midwest Collegiate Conference (MCC) – NAIA
- 1993–1995 – American Midwest Conference – NAIA
- 1974–1993 – Independent – NAIA

== Notable alumni ==
- Warren Wallace Beckwith, baseball player
- Bill Bedenbaugh, college football coach
- William Andrews Clark, United States Senator and business magnate
- Clement Isong, second governor of the Central Bank of Nigeria
- George B. Corkhill, United States Attorney for the District of Columbia
- Dana Holgorsen, college football coach
- Davey Lopes, professional baseball player and manager
- Jessie Wilson Manning, author and lecturer
- Belle Babb "Arabella" Mansfield, first woman lawyer in the United States
- George B. McKibbin, lawyer, politician and government official; 1943 Republican nominee for mayor of Chicago
- Julia Baldwin McKibbin, author and educator (later served as university's dean of women)
- John H. Mickey, 17th governor of Nebraska (1903–1907)
- Ola Babcock Miller, Iowa Secretary of State
- Sandy Sandberg, professional football player
- Jeannette Throckmorton, physician, quilter
- James Van Allen, astrophysicist who discovered the Van Allen radiation belt circling the earth
- Peggy Whitson, NASA Chief Astronaut and first female commander of the International Space Station
