= 1931 Chicago mayoral election =

1931 Chicago Mayoral election
- Turnout: 82%
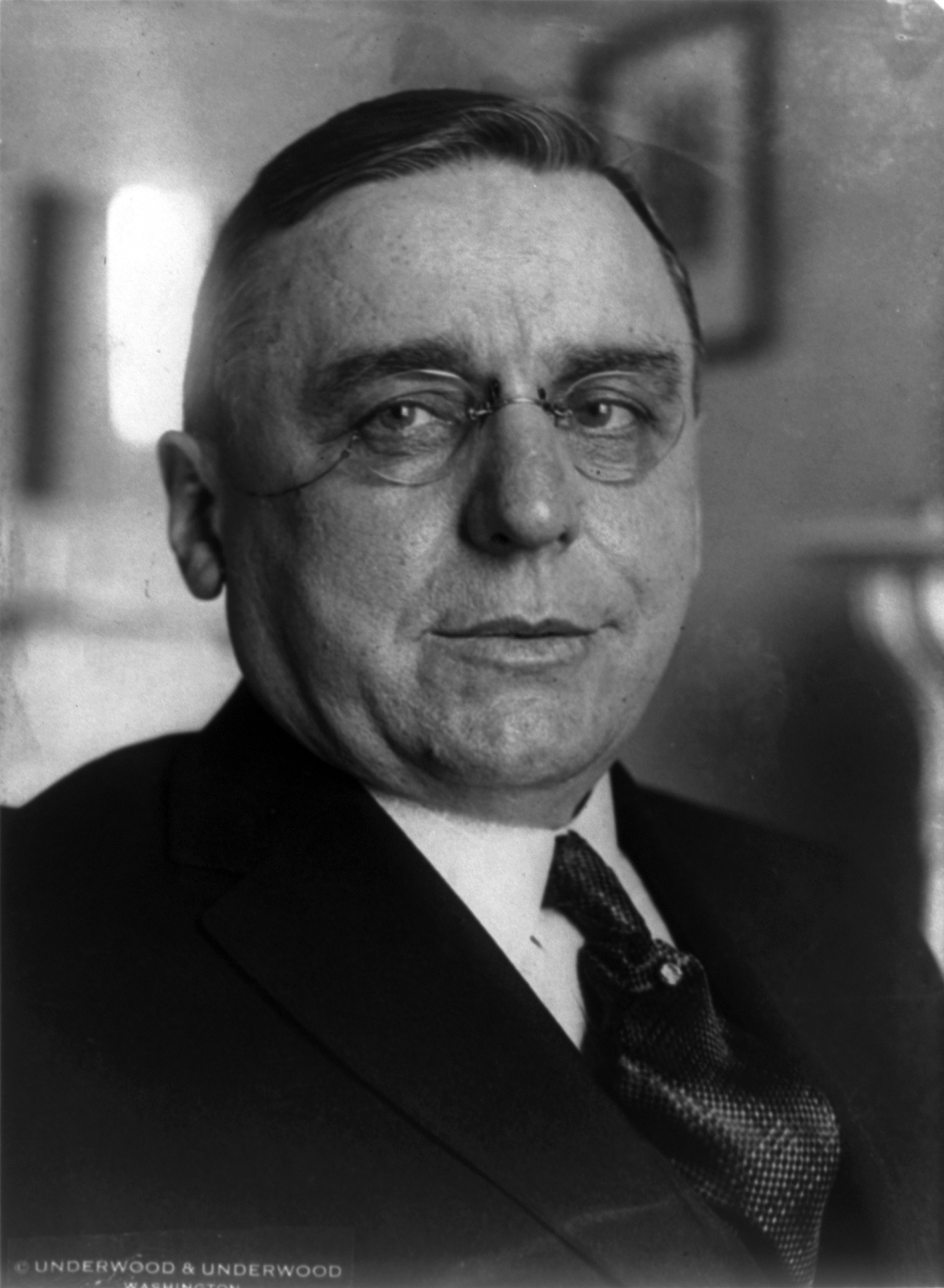

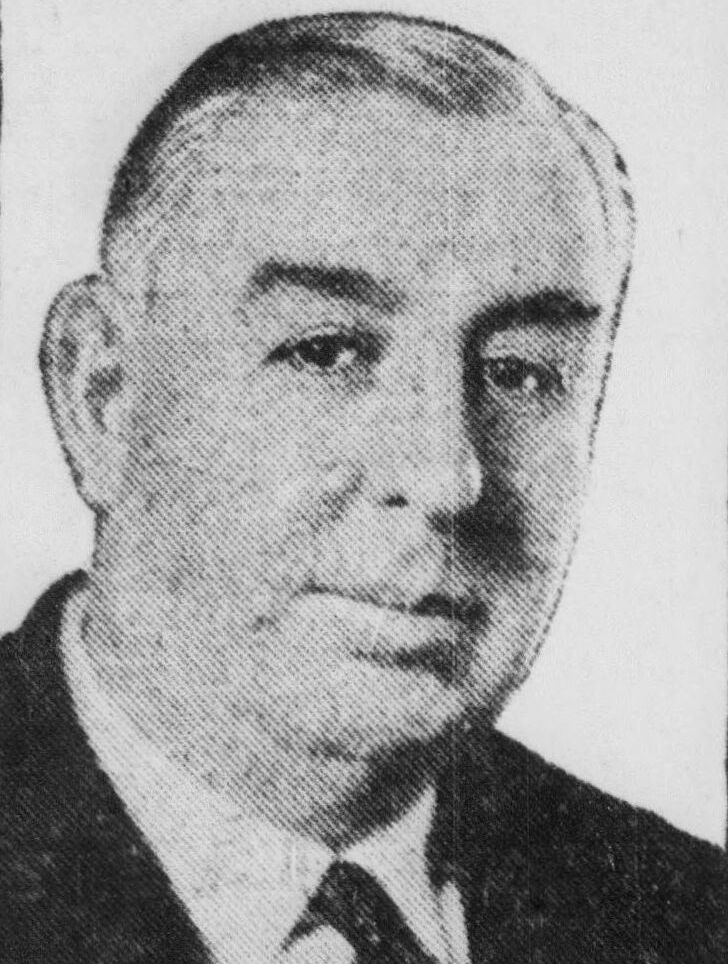
Nominee	Anton Cermak	William Hale Thompson
Party	Democratic	Republican
Popular vote	671,189	476,922
Percentage	58.4%	41.5%
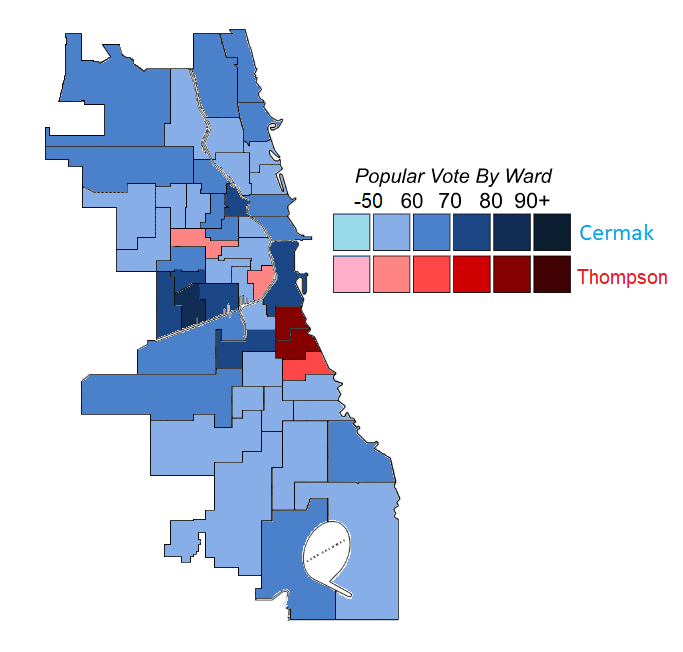
- Ward results
Mayor before election
William Hale Thompson
Republican
Elected mayor
Anton Cermak
Democratic

The 1931 Chicago mayoral election was held to elect the Mayor of Chicago. Former Cook County Board of Commissioners President Anton Cermak defeated incumbent mayor William Hale Thompson (who remains to date the last Republican mayor of Chicago) by a 17-point margin of victory.

Primary elections were held by both major parties to select their nominees. Mayor Thompson won renomination in the Republican Party primary over challenges from Municipal Court of Chicago Judge John Homer Lyle and 43rd Ward Chicago Alderman Arthur F. Albert. In the Democratic Party primary, Cermak only faced a weak opponent in perennial candidate John B. DeVoney.

== Nominations ==
Primaries were held on Feb 24, 1931.

=== Democratic primary ===
Anton Cermak won the Democratic nomination. Cermak was the incumbent President of the Cook County Board of Commissioners, having served in that position since 1923.

Cermak defeated perennial candidate John B. DeVoney, a weak opponent. Returns reported in the Chicago Tribune on the day after the election found Cermak winning 235,260 votes to DeVoney's 9,829 votes.

=== Republican primary ===
Incumbent mayor William Hale Thompson warded off challenges from Municipal Court of Chicago Judge John Homer Lyle, 43rd Ward alderman Arthur F. Albert, George K. Schmidt (the 1922 Republican nominee for the Cook County Board of Assessors), and Eugene McCaffrey.

John Homer Lyle was characterized by Time magazine as a "publicity-crazed Municipal Judge." Previously an obscure figure, his political stock had risen massively in September 1930 when he had some of Chicago's most prominent gangsters arrested under an obscure vagrancy law and attempted to keep them imprisoned by setting an extremely high bail, a tactic which failed to work. The majority of his campaign was based on attacking Thompson for his presumed closeness with organised crime, especially Al Capone. Lyle also claimed that Chicago's economic success under Thompson's mayoralty had not been due to the mayor, stating in a speech that "an Eskimo from the North Pole might as well have been mayor" when referring to Thompson taking credit for the construction of skyscrapers.

Ugly name-calling took place between Thompson and Lyle. Thompson derided Lyle as a "nutty judge". Lyle called Thompson "William Halitosis Thompson" and characterized him as having the "flabby jowls of a barnyard hog, two jackass ears, a cowboy hat and an empty space between." Other insults slung around between the two included dirty rat, hoodlum, lazy bloodsucking jobber, blustering loudmouth, irresponsible mountebank, blubbering jungle hippopotamus, shambling imbecile, skunk, and a "chambermaid in a ranch bunkhouse".

Republican primary results
Party	Candidate	Votes	%
Republican	William Hale Thompson (incumbent)	296,204	46.65
Republican	John Homer Lyle	227,986	35.90
Republican	Arthur F. Albert	99,137	15.61
Republican	George K. Schmidt	10,782	1.70
Republican	Eugene McCaffrey	907	0.14
Total votes		635,016	100.00

=== Independents ===
==== Write-in candidates ====
- John M. Collins
- Otto H. Wangerin
- Herman N. Bundesen
- Charles Cutteng
- Dallas Killiam
- R.J. Williamson
- Carter Harrison IV
- Louis J. Orr
- Winfield O. Williams
- Judge Lagle

== General election ==
=== Campaign ===
With the Century of Progress approaching, Chicago would be electing a mayor that (barring extraordinary circumstances) was going to represent the city in front of an international audience.

The campaign became uncivil at a relatively early stage. During the campaign Thompson made many appeals to nativism. One such example was his appeal to antisemitism by villainization of Jewish businessman Julius Rosenwald. In one speech delivered in March he said of Rosenwald, "Well, we got a great philanthropist in this town, and he's a Jew, and he's trying to edge his way out of hell by giving part of the money he steals."

Since Cermak was an immigrant from Bohemia, Thompson lodged ethnic attacks

I won't take a back seat to that Bohunk, Chairmock, Chermack or whatever his name is.
Tony, Tony, where's your pushcart at?
Can you picture a World's Fair mayor with a name like that?

Cermak was able to respond effectively to these attacks, "He doesn't like my name...It's true I didn't come over on the Mayflower, but I came over as soon as I could," which was a sentiment to which ethnic Chicagoans could relate, so Thompson's slurs largely backfired.

In the midst of the campaign, the Chicago Tribune ran articles outlining Al Capone's financial contributions to Republican politicians. The newspapers also covered allegations that Samuel Insull had contributed money to Thompson's campaign. The Tribune wrote, "When the traction case was settled during Thompson's third term Insull was given a perpetual franchise that could not be terminated even for misuse non use or mal use".

Gossip of Thompson's ties to Al Capone gained new strength after one of Thompson's top city officials, also a friend of Capone, was indicted for conspiring with merchants to use short weights to cheat $54 million.

Thompson accused Cermak of being in cahoots with bootleggers and gamblers, and accused Cermak of having profited from misconduct alleging that he had, "saved six million out of a $10,000 salary."

The election took place amid the Great Depression. The Depression (taking place under the administration of president Herbert Hoover, who was a member of the Republican Party) may have ultimately contributed to Thompson's defeat as a bearer of the Republican label.

Cermak received strong support from the city's teachers organizations. He was personally endorsed by Margaret Haley, president of the Chicago Teachers Federation.

Many liberal Republicans, in protest of Thompson, threw their support behind Cermak. Among them were Jane Addams, Louise DeKoven Bowen, Charles Edward Merriam, and Julius Rosenwald.

For the election, Cermak had managed to overhaul his public image. Long viewed as a political infighter, Cermak rebranded himself as a "master executive" who would be able to help the city of Chicago survive the Great Depression.

Cermak managed to unite the different factions of the local Democratic Party. He made use of both threats and incentives to garner the backing of political rivals such as Cook County Coroner Herman Bundesen and Cook County Recorder of Deeds Clayton F. Smith . Bundesen had been considered a potential independent candidate, but, in March 1931, he ruled out a run. Cermak's "ethnic credentials" and anti-Prohibition stance also managed to appeal to many working class and ethnic voters that the party had lost to Thompson in the previous election.

=== Results ===
Voter turnout was remarkably high, with 82% of registered voters participating.

Cermak carried 45 wards, while Thompson carried five. The five wards that Thompson carried all had sizable black populations.

Mayor of Chicago 1931 (General Election)
Party	Candidate	Votes	%
Democratic	Anton Cermak	671,189	58.44
Republican	William Hale Thompson (incumbent)	476,922	41.53
Unknown	John M. Collins	219	0.02
Unknown	Otto H. Wangerin	124	0.01
Unknown	Herman N. Bundesen	4	0.00
Unknown	Charles Cutteng	1	0.00
Unknown	Dallas Killiam	1	0.00
Unknown	R.J. Williamson	1	0.00
Unknown	Carter Harrison	1	0.00
Unknown	Louis J. Orr	1	0.00
Unknown	Winfield O. Williams	1	0.00
Unknown	Judge Lagle	1	0.00
Turnout		1,148,465	100.00

Thompson carried only five of the city's fifty wards.

Cermak received 76.80% of the Polish-American vote, while Thompson received 23.20%.
