= Archibald Carey =

Archibald Carey or Cary may refer to:

- Archibald Carey Jr. (1908–1981), African-American politician
- Archibald Cary (1721–1787), colonial-era Virginia politician

== See also ==
- Archibald Cary Coolidge (1866–1928), American educator
