= Municipal Courts Building =

Municipal Courts Building may refer to the following buildings:

- Municipal Courts Building (Chicago, Illinois), listed on the National Register of Historic Places
- Municipal Courts Building (St. Louis), listed on the National Register of Historic Places in St. Louis
