= Frank J. Corr =

American politician

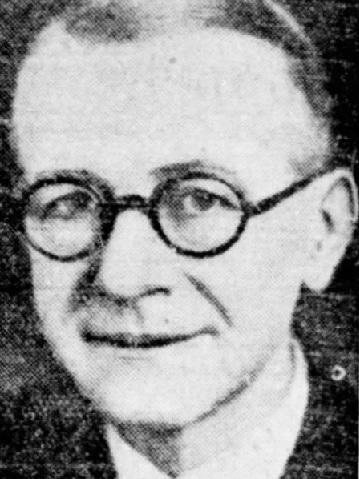
- Corr, circa 1933

Acting Mayor of Chicago
- In office March 15, 1933 – April 8, 1933
- Preceded by: Anton Cermak
- Succeeded by: Edward J. Kelly

Personal details
- Born: January 12, 1877 Brooklyn, New York, U.S.
- Died: June 3, 1934 (aged 57) Chicago, Illinois, U.S.
- Resting place: Holy Sepulchre Cemetery; Alsip, Illinois
- Party: Democratic
- Spouse: Mary Burke (m. 1902–1934)
- Education: Chicago-Kent College of Law

Frank J. Corr (January 12, 1877 – June 3, 1934) was an American politician. Corr served as the 45th mayor of Chicago, Illinois. Corr's term was as acting mayor from March 15, 1933, following the assassination of Anton Cermak until April 8, 1933. Corr was a member of the Democratic Party.

== Biography ==
Corr was born in Brooklyn, New York, and his family moved to Chicago in 1889. He graduated from Chicago-Kent College of Law in 1899. Corr was admitted to the bar, and practiced in Chicago.

In 1902, Corr was appointed assistant corporation counsel for Chicago. Although he briefly left that position to become a law partner to Judge Walter T. Stanton, he returned to the counsel's office during the administration of Mayor William Dever. During this time, he became active in ward politics and, in 1931, was elected alderman of Chicago's 17th Ward.

Corr was in his second term as alderman when Cermak was assassinated in March 1933. Though he was not interested in the position, probably because of ill health and the limits placed on the interim mayor's powers, Corr yielded to the entreaties of Democratic Party leader Patrick Nash, who wanted an interim appointee to serve until a permanent replacement could be selected. Nash promised Corr that he would not have to serve an extended term and the city council then elected Corr to serve as acting mayor until the Illinois General Assembly authorized the council to appoint a permanent replacement. The city council vote was won by Edward Kelly. During Corr's brief administration, his bodyguards killed a nineteen-year-old burglar when they heard a commotion at a hotel near Corr's house. As Acting Mayor, Corr lacked the ability to sign tax warrants, limiting salary payments for city and school employees. When five aldermen traveled to Hot Springs, Arkansas, Corr followed them to bring them back to Chicago to ensure that his replacement could be elected quickly.

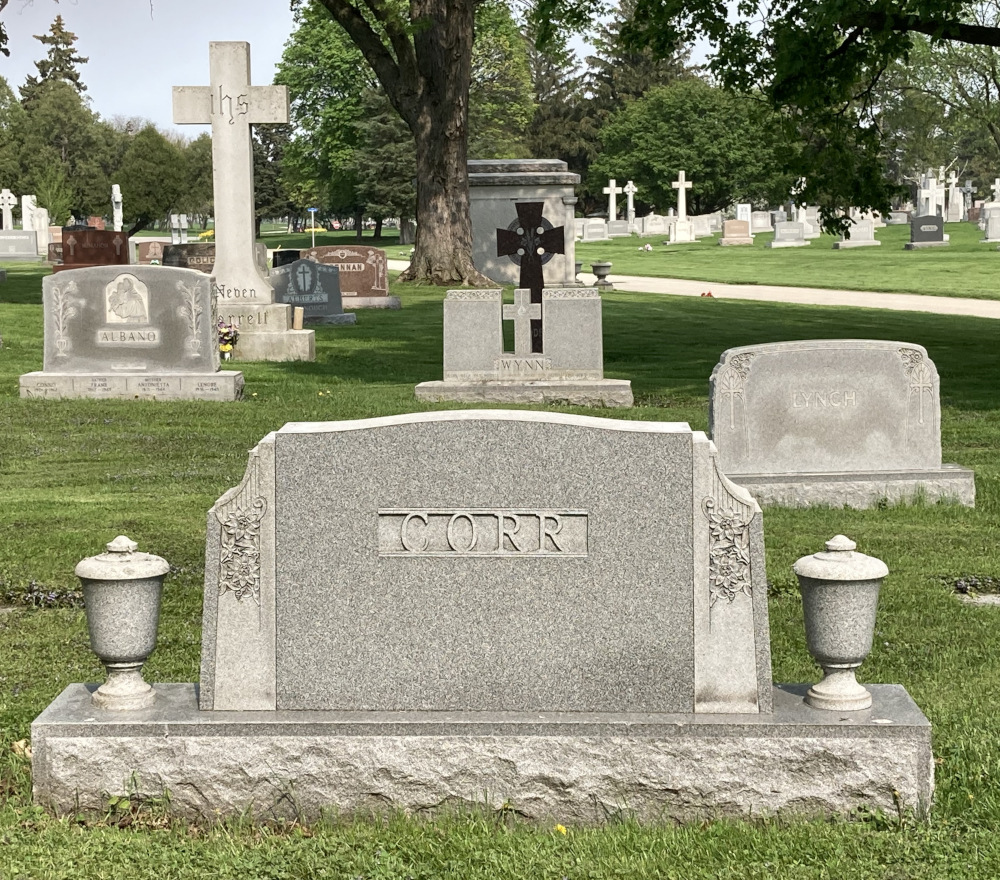
Corr's grave at Holy Sepulchre Cemetery

At the time of his death, Corr was serving as alderman and running uncontested for election as judge of the circuit court. With his death the night before the election, he was replaced on the ballot by Cornelius J. Harrington. He was buried in Holy Sepulchre Cemetery.

Corr's father, Frank V. Corr, died four weeks before Corr.

Political offices
Preceded by Anton Cermak	Mayor of Chicago; 1933	Succeeded by Edward J. Kelly
