= Arthur F. Albert =

American politician (1898–1970)

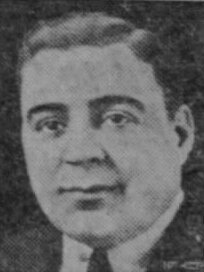
- Albert, circa 1930

Alderman of the Chicago City Council
- In office 1929–1931
- Preceded by: Titus Haffa
- Succeeded by: James B. Waller
- Constituency: 43rd ward
- In office April 16, 1923 – October 31, 1927
- Preceded by: Himself as alderman of the 22nd ward
- Succeeded by: Titus Haffa
- Constituency: 43rd ward
- In office 1921 – April 16, 1923 Serving with Leo C. Klein
- Preceded by: Math Hibbeler
- Succeeded by: Himself as alderman of the 43rd ward Joseph Cepak as alderman of the 22nd ward
- Constituency: 22nd ward

Personal details
- Born: October 4, 1898
- Died: October 27, 1970 (aged 70)

Arthur F. Albert (October 4, 1898 – October 26, 1970) was alderman of Chicago's 22nd ward from 1921 to 1923 and upon its redistricting into the 43rd ward from 1923 to 1927 and again from 1929 to 1931. He was born to German parents. A Republican who always had an independent streak, he broke with his party in 1931, unsuccessfully running for the Republican nomination in that year's mayoral election under the tutelage of Edward R. Litsinger and later becoming an independent.

In 1927, he had defended his seat from challenger Titus Haffa in a runoff, but the City Council voted that the judge who had awarded the runoff had erred in including spoiled ballots to deny Haffa the needed majority, vacating Albert in favor of Haffa on October 31. Albert had previously served as Haffa's chauffeur. Albert regained the seat in 1929, but retired for his mayoral bid in 1931.

Albert ran once again for the Republican mayoral nomination in 1943, but lost the primary to George B. McKibbin, who in turn lost to the Democrat Edward J. Kelly.

Albert died October 26, 1970, and is buried at Resurrection Catholic Cemetery in Justice, Illinois.
