= Julia Baldwin McKibbin =

American educator and author (1855–1939)

Julia Baldwin McKibbin (December 16, 1855– April 5, 1939) was an American educator, author, and philanthropist. She served as chair of the history department and dean of women at Iowa Wesleyan College, and authored the book "Meriam" (published in 1905).

== Early life, family, and education ==
Julia Baldwin was born December 16, 1855, the daughter of Keosauqua, Iowa She is the daughter of Charles Baldwin and Rachel Wright. Her maternal uncles were Joseph A. Wright (governor of Indiana) George G. Wright (justice of the Iowa Supreme Court).

McKibbin received preparatory education at Keosauqua High School and the State University of Georgia. She attended one year at Iowa State University and graduated from Iowa Wesleyan College with a Bachelor of Arts and a Master of Science. She began attending Iowa Wesleyan in 1882, and received the latter degree in 1886. She was one of the earliest members of the P.E.O. Sisterhood, joining it when it was a college sorority.

On July 20, 1886 she married Dr. George J. McKibbin. Together they had one son, George B. McKibbin, who was born April 26, 1888. She was widowed when her husband died in 1895.

== Career ==
McKibbin worked as an educator and writer, and was also a prominent philanthropist.

McKibbin worked as a teacher at Washington Academy from 1884 to 1886, and at a private school in Keosauqua, Iowa.

After the death of her husband, McKibbin became the chair of history at Iowa Wesleyan College. In 1899, McKibbin became a charter member of the Women's Guild of Iowa Wesleyan College. She worked as its field secretary. She taught history at the university for several years, but left in order to move to Keosauqua to care for her ailing parents. After her parents died, she returned to Iowa Wesleyan where she worked during the final two years that her own son attended there, working as the Dean of Women for Iowa Wesleyan University from 1907 to 1909.

McKibbin authored the book "Miriam". Published in 1905, the book sold many copies and received positive literary reviews. She also authored many published short stories, serials for magazines, and newspaper articles.

McKibbin later was a prominent philanthropist in Utah. She died April 5, 1939 in Glendale, California at the age of 84, and was buried in Bloomfield, Iowa.

== Personal life ==
McKibbin was a member of the Methodist Episcopal Church. She was a member of the Mount Pleasant Ladies Library Association, the second-oldest women's library club in the United States and the oldest in Iowa. She also extensively traveled across the United States and Europe.
