= Paddy Bauler =

American politician

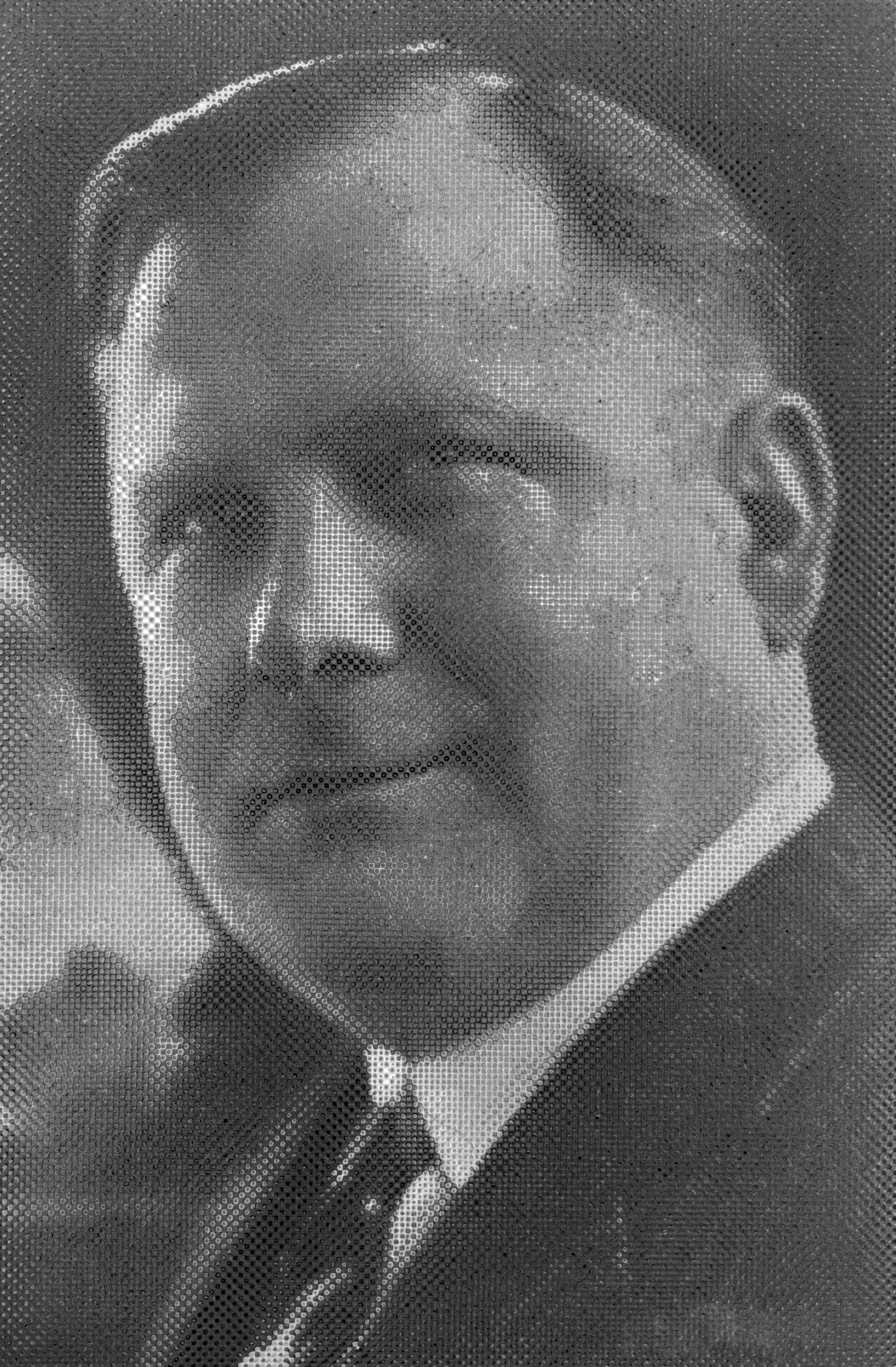
- Bauler circa 1926

Alderman of the Chicago City Council
- In office 1947–1967
- Preceded by: James B. Waller
- Succeeded by: George McCutcheon
- Constituency: 43rd ward
- In office 1933–1943
- Preceded by: James B. Waller
- Succeeded by: James B. Waller

Personal details
- Born: Mathias Bauler; January 27, 1890 Chicago, Illinois, U.S.
- Died: August 22, 1977 (aged 87) Chicago, Illinois, U.S.
- Party: Democratic
- Relations: John Bauler (brother)
- Children: Harry Bauler (son)

Mathias "Paddy" Bauler (January 27, 1890 – August 22, 1977) was an American saloonkeeper and alderman of the 43rd ward of Chicago from 1933 to 1943 and again from 1947 to 1967. He was known as a corrupt, controversial and charismatic Chicago political boss and is famous for the quote, "Chicago ain't ready for reform yet", or "Chicago ain't ready for a reform mayor" which he exclaimed many times over while dancing a jig in his saloon upon the news of Richard J. Daley's first election as mayor of Chicago in 1955. Mayor Daley banned Bauler from attending public functions for a time shortly after the quote was published. He was the brother of Herman and John Bauler, who had respectively been aldermen from 1909 to 1911 and 1912 to 1920 when the area was part of the 22nd ward.

== Early life ==
Mathias Bauler's father was born in Germany and his mother was born in Illinois of German descent. He weighed between 225 and 275 lbs. and claimed that he did not know that his real name was not 'Paddy' until he was six years old.

Bauler had an early career in boxing, and contrary to the claim made above it has been argued that he first acquired the nickname "Paddy" while in the ring as no one without an Irish name would be taken seriously. (Bauler would continue to pretend to be Irish well into his political career.)

His brother Herman was the first member of the family to get into local Democratic politics, moving out of the old family saloon and opening one of his own at the intersection of Clybourn Avenue and Blackhawk Street known as "Camp Kiowa." Herman was elected alderman of what was then the 22nd ward in 1909. Under Herman's aegis Paddy was first given a city job, which he would continue to receive throughout his career as late as 1957, and which continued under other brother John's aldermanic tenure from 1912 to 1920. Eventually the city jobs were lucrative enough to let Paddy quit his boxing career. Both of the elder Baulers were accused by police of allowing gambling in their establishments and would fight them on the matter.

Paddy first ran for 43rd ward alderman in 1925, at which time he was a timekeeper at the County Treasurer's Office, although he was defeated by Republican incumbent Arthur F. Albert, 6,936 votes to 4,193. Albert claimed that Bauler was given much money for his campaign by corrupt mob-linked Republican and erstwhile mayor "Big Bill" Thompson, while Bauler's supporters claimed that Albert was a supporter of Prohibition and a Klansman. At the time Bauler was better known for the entertainment he provided at what would later become the De Luxe Gardens.

He was a candidate for 43rd Ward Democratic Committeeman in 1928, along with Rudolph L. Schapp and James J. O'Toole. By 1932 he was a district leader for the 43rd ward.

== Saloonkeeping and politics ==
Bauler operated a speakeasy at Willow and Howe streets during prohibition and once prohibition was repealed became the first person to obtain a liquor license in Chicago His two-story political office on North Ave. and Sedgwick avenues was also a saloon called De Luxe Gardens.

Bauler was known as a corrupt politician and against reform. In addition to his infamous assertion of Chicago's unpreparedness for reform, has been quoted as saying that one reformer was "[...] so dumb he probably thinks the forest preserve is some kind of jelly." He had been accused of being a "political power that protects graft, gambling, vice and other lawlessness." In 1933 he shot two Chicago police officers (non-lethally) because, in his words "...they swore at me and called me a fat Dutch pig". Bauler was cleared from any wrongdoing. Mayor Kelly was quoted as saying that Bauler "Was a real straight-shooter". From an early age he was also friends with Charlie Weber, who played a prominent role in the politics of the area and would eventually serve as alderman for the nearby 45th ward from 1955 to his death in 1960.

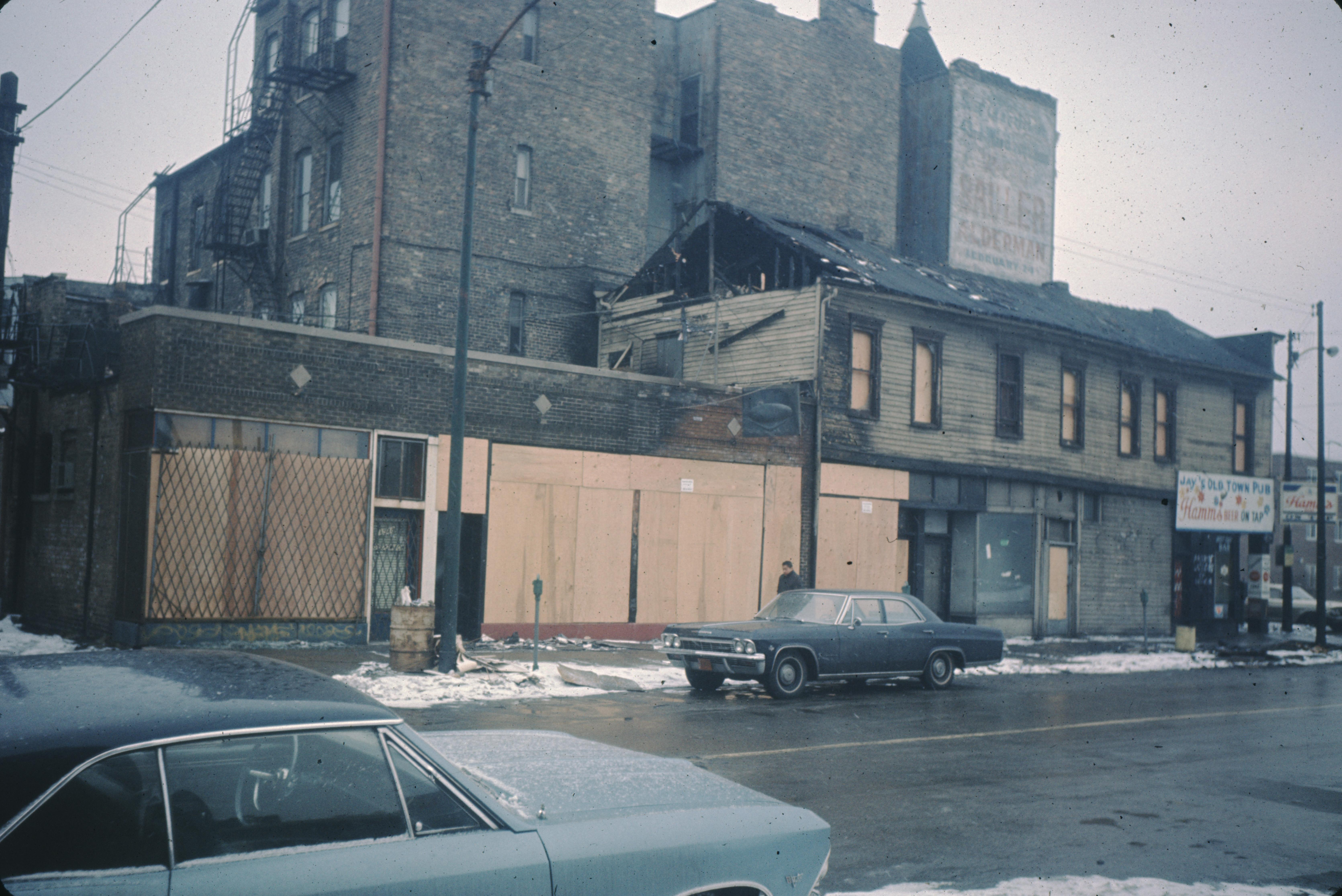
The former two story office and saloon on Sedgwick and North Avenues as photographed circa 1966 after a fire. A painted advertisement for Bauler can be seen in this photo on the wall above the building.

He was also known for his charisma. Despite being himself of German extraction, he would often play the role of a "Jolly Irishman" to further his political ambitions. On his retirement as an Alderman in 1966, he was asked how he stayed in office so long and replied "There ain't a thing they ask me that I don't try to do."

== Family ==
His son was Harry Bauler (1910–1962) who was elected to the Illinois House of Representatives; Harry Bauler died before he was able to take the oath of office.

== Legacy ==
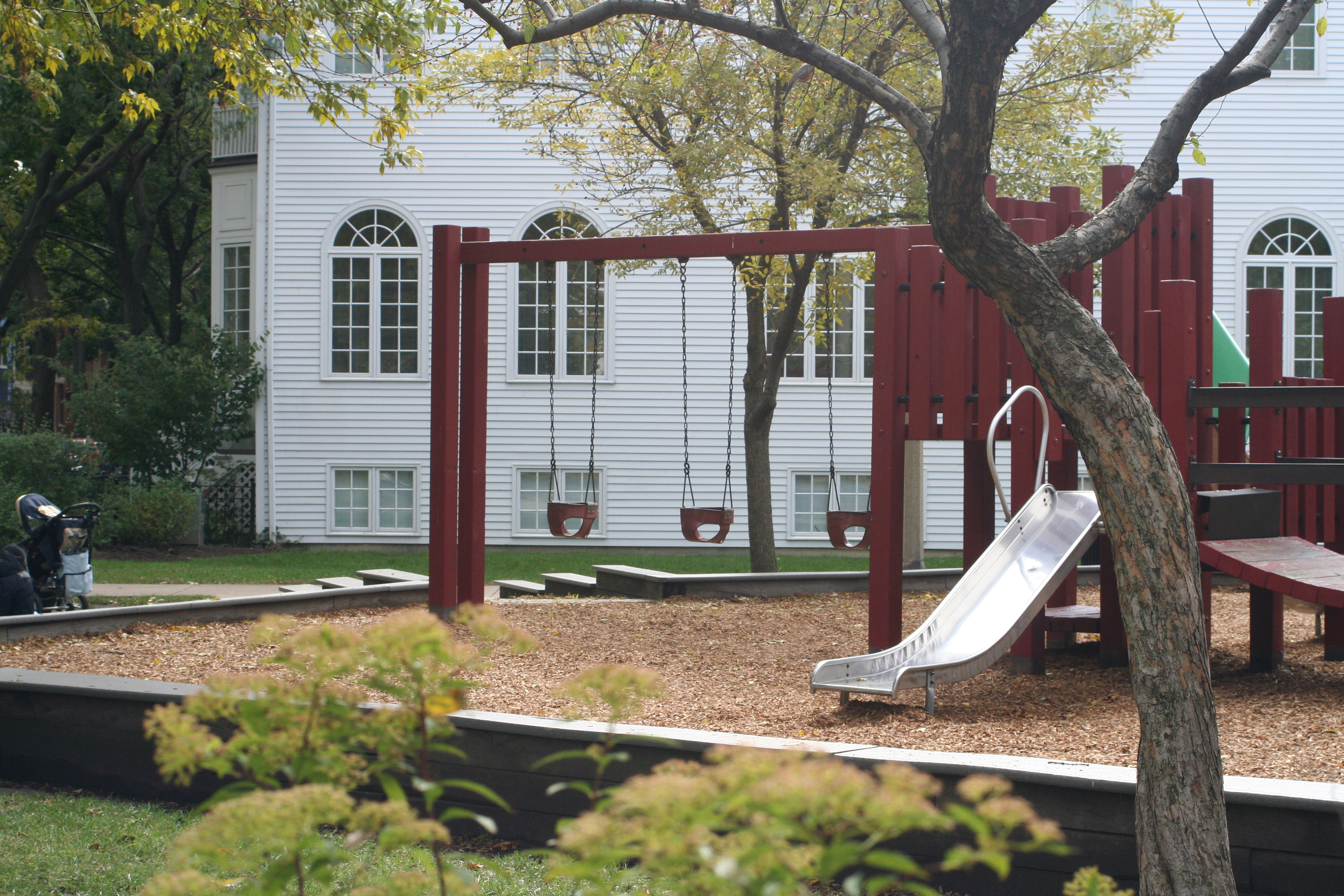
Bauler Park, Chicago

- The character of the corrupt alderman John O'Shea from the 1987 film, The Untouchables, was partly modeled after Bauler.
- Bauler Park in Old Town is named after him.

== See also ==
- Dorsey Crowe, similarly corrupt alderman representing neighboring 42nd ward during much of Bauler's term
- List of Chicago aldermen since 1923

| Preceded by James B. Waller | Member of the Chicago City Council; 43rd Ward; 1933 – 1943 | Succeeded by James B. Waller |
| Preceded by James B. Waller | Member of the Chicago City Council; 43rd Ward; 1947 – 1967 | Succeeded by George McCutcheon |
