= Executive Order 10479 =

U.S. directive; established the Government Contract Committee

- Establishing the Government Contract Committee
- Type: Executive order
- Number: 10479
- President: Dwight D. Eisenhower
- Signed: August 13, 1953

Federal Register details
- Publication date: August 18, 1953

Summary
- Forbade discrimination in awarding of government contracts based on applicants' race, creed, color, or national origin; Established the Government Contract Committee; Instructed the Committee to make recommendations on improving non-discrimination procedures at agencies; Required agencies to report to the Committee on complaints, including those passed to the agency by the Committee

Executive Order No. 10479 (18 FR 4899) is a directive by President Dwight Eisenhower that created the Government Contract Committee. Issued on August 13, 1953, the order sought to insure compliance with, and successful execution of, the equal employment opportunity program. Therefore, the United States Government enacted laws to guarantee equal employment opportunity to all employees, so that they receive fair and equitable treatment. The order directs that all qualified candidates seeking employment on government contracts or subcontracts will not be discriminated against due to their race, creed, color, or national origin.

There was some attempt to capitalize on the general administrative strategies of former Republican presidents while in office. According to Maranto, Republican politicians had long been known as non-bureaucratic. Therefore, in an effort to combat this image, President Eisenhower, and succeeding Presidents Nixon and Reagan, executed administrative decisions strategically.

Additional research on former United States President Dwight Eisenhower's economic policies and platforms detail the economic policies that Eisenhower pushed for, why he felt they were necessary, and how successful they were. In an historical analysis, Thurber questioned the effectiveness of the executive order and its ability to combat discrimination regarding government contract work due to its failure to fix systemic injustice and discrimination issues.

In 1961, President John F. Kennedy superseded the order with Executive Order 10925.
