= Municipal Courts Building (Chicago) =

Office skyscraper in Chicago, Illinois

- U.S. National Register of Historic Places
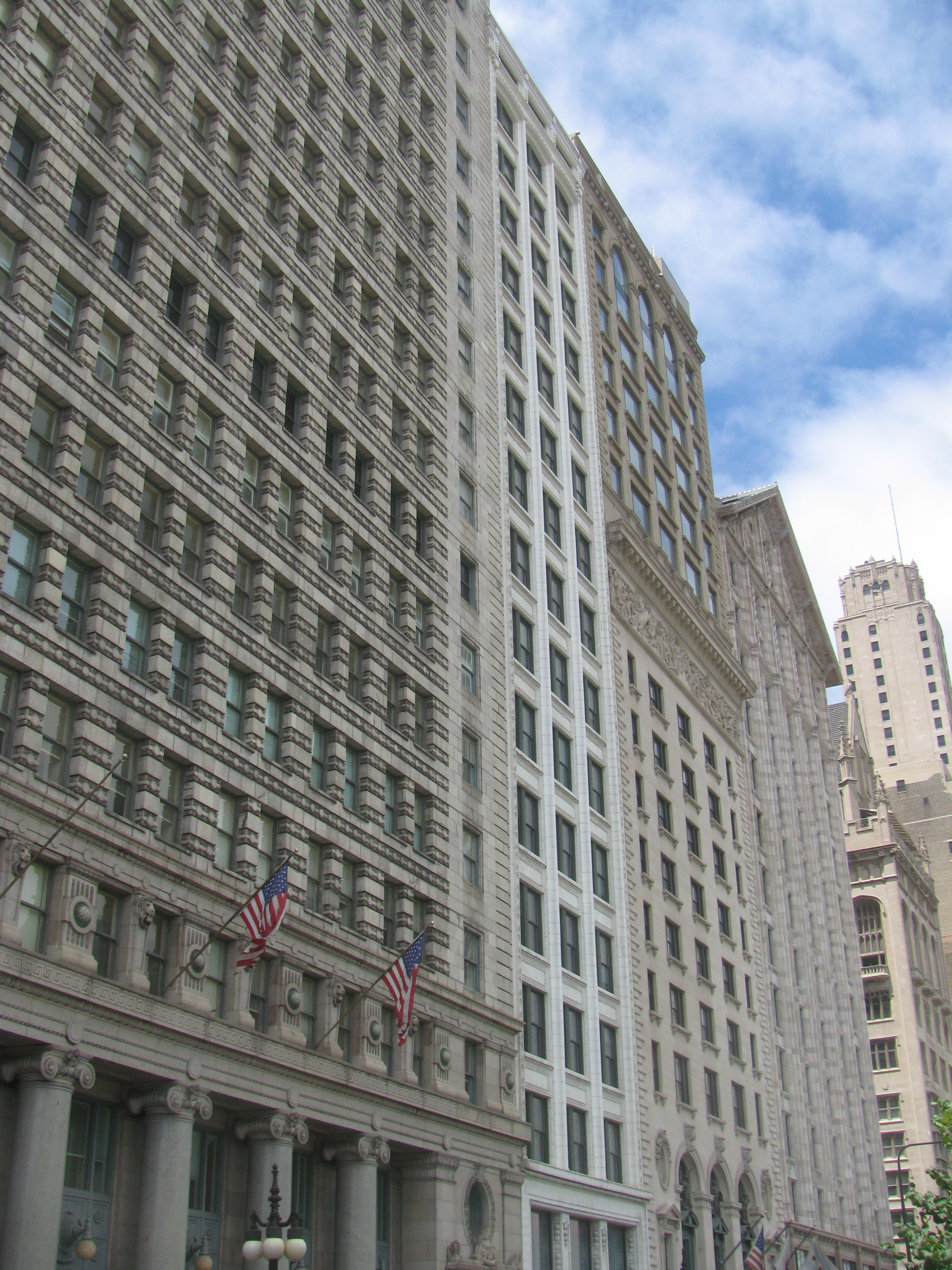
- The Municipal Courts Building in 2008, situated between its wider neighbors

- Location within Chicago metropolitan area Location within Illinois Location within the United States
- Location: 116 S. Michigan Ave., Chicago, Illinois
- Coordinates: 41°52′48″N 87°37′28″W
- Area: less than one acre
- Built: 1906–07
- Architects: Jenny, Mundie & Jensen
- Architectural style: Chicago
- NRHP reference No.: 85001912
- Added to NRHP: August 29, 1985

Original construction before more floors were added to the building.

The Municipal Courts Building, also known as the Lake View Building, is a skyscraper located at 116 S. Michigan Avenue in Chicago, Illinois. The building was built from 1906 to 1907 to serve as a temporary home for Chicago's Municipal Court. Jacob L. Kesner built the building, which was originally 12 stories tall, on a strip of land only 40 feet (12 m) wide; Kesner was one of the few property owners willing to grant the Municipal Court of Chicago a short-term lease. The building was completed later than planned, had less square footage than promised, and charged a higher rent than a competing offer from a warehouse, prompting Mayor Edward Dunne to conduct an ethics investigation into the approval of the building contract. The court only used the building until 1911; after it moved out, Kesner added another five stories to the building.

The building was added to the National Register of Historic Places on August 29, 1985.
