= John Bauler =

American politician

Member of the Chicago City Council from the 22nd ward
- In office 1912–1920
- Preceded by: Bernard F. Clettenberg
- Succeeded by: Leo C. Klein

Personal details
- Relatives: Paddy Bauler
- Occupation: Politician

John Bauler was an American politician. He was alderman of the 22nd ward of the Chicago City Council, consisting at the time of the western half of the Near North Side and the southwestern quadrant of Lincoln Park, from 1912 to 1920. He was the brother of Mathias 'Paddy' Bauler, who would serve as alderman of the same area from 1933 to 1967 when it was part of the 43rd ward.

Political offices
Preceded by Bernard F Clettenberg	Member of the Chicago City Council; 22nd Ward; 1912 – 1920; With: Victor J Schaeffer, 1912–1915; William P Elliston, 1915–1919; Math Hibbeler, 1919–1920	Succeeded by Leo C Klein
