= Harry Bauler =

American politician

- Born: November 30, 1910; Chicago, Illinois, US
- Died: December 6, 1962 (aged 52)
- Occupation: Superintendent of the Chicago Department of Sanitation
- Political party: Democratic
- Father: Paddy Bauler

Harry P. Bauler (November 30, 1910 – December 6, 1962) was an American politician.

== Background ==
Born in Chicago, Illinois, Bauler was the general superintendent of the Department of Sanitation with the City of Chicago and was involved with the Democratic Party. His father, Mathias Bauler, was a member of the Chicago City Council. In November 1962, Bauler was elected to the Illinois House of Representatives but died of a heart attack, in his office, in Chicago before he took the oath of office as a representative.
