= Archibald Carey Jr. =

American politician (1908–1981)

Judge of the Cook County Circuit Court
- In office 1966–1979

Member of the President's Committee on Government Employment Policy
- In office 1957–1961
- President: Dwight D. Eisenhower
- Preceded by: Maxwell Abbell

United States Alternate Delegate to the United Nations
- In office 1953–1956
- President: Dwight D. Eisenhower

Member of the Chicago City Council from the 3rd ward
- In office 1947–1955
- Preceded by: Oscar Stanton De Priest
- Succeeded by: Ralph Metcalfe

Personal details
- Born: February 29, 1908 Chicago, Illinois, U.S.
- Died: April 20, 1981 (aged 73) Chicago, Illinois, U.S.
- Party: Republican (until 1966)
- Other political affiliations: Democratic (after 1966)
- Spouse: Hazel Harper
- Children: Carolyn Eloise
- Education: Lewis Institute (BS); Northwestern University (BDiv); Chicago-Kent College of Law (LL.B.)

Archibald James Carey Jr. (February 29, 1908 – April 20, 1981) was an American lawyer, judge, politician, diplomat, and clergyman from the South Side of Chicago. He was elected as a city alderman and served for eight years under the patronage of the politician William L. Dawson. He served for several years as a pastor in the African Methodist Episcopal (AME) Church, when he became known as a civil rights activist. In 1957, he was appointed by President Dwight Eisenhower as chair of his committee on government employment policy, which worked to reduce racial discrimination.

Appointed to the Circuit Court of Cook County, Illinois, in 1966, Judge Carey became a major figure in Chicago's political life, serving until 1979. He won numerous awards for his oratorical skills and contributions to civic improvement.

== Early life and education ==
Archibald Carey Jr. was born on February 29, 1908, in Chicago, Illinois. The youngest of five children born to the Reverend Archibald J. Carey, a minister of the African Methodist Episcopal Church, and his wife, Elizabeth H. (Davis) Carey, Carey Jr. was a native of Chicago. He attended Wendell Phillips High School. He received a Bachelor of Science degree from Lewis Institute (now Illinois Institute of Technology) in 1928, as well as a degree from Northwestern University in 1932, and a Bachelor of Laws degree from Chicago-Kent College of Law in Chicago in 1935. Carey was a member of Alpha Phi Alpha.

After being accepted to the bar, Carey set up a legal practice in Chicago.

== Political and government career ==
Carey became politically active and allied with William L. Dawson, a leading African-American politician on the city's South Side.

=== Chicago City Council (1947–55) ===
Carey was twice elected to serve as an alderman from Chicago's Third Ward, serving from 1947 to 1955. During this time, he was chosen to give a speech to the 1952 Republican National Convention, which met that year in Chicago. His speech called for equal rights for all minorities. The speech was titled "Let Freedom Ring". Historian Drew Hansen has opined that Martin Luther King Jr. plagiarized from this speech in creating his own celebrated "I Have a Dream" speech, noting that many of the motifs and tropes were part of a common language.

In 1953, Carey was the headline speaker at the second annual rally of the Regional Council of Negro Leadership, a civil rights organization in Mound Bayou, Mississippi. The Council promoted a boycott of service stations which refused to provide restrooms for African Americans. When the founder and head of the Council, Dr. T.R.M. Howard moved to Chicago, Carey, a fellow Republican, supported his campaign for the U.S. House in 1958.

Carey was appointed by president Dwight D. Eisenhower as an alternate delegate from the United States to the United Nations, serving from 1953 to 1956.

=== President's Committee on Government Employment Policy (1955–61) ===
From 1955 to 1961, he served on the President's Committee on Government Employment Policy; on August 3, 1957, he was appointed by President Dwight D. Eisenhower as chair of the committee, succeeding Maxwell Abbell, who died. Carey was the first African American to hold this position. Already a confidante of Martin Luther King Jr. and active in the national civil rights movement, Carey worked to end employment discrimination in the government against blacks.

=== Cook County Circuit Court judge (1966–79) ===
Carey was appointed as a county Circuit Court judge in Chicago in 1966, by which time he had switched parties to become a Democrat. He served until 1978, when he was forced by law to retire from the bench at 70 years of age. Because of the court's large caseload, he was reappointed to serve another year.

== AME Church ==
In 1949, Carey was named as pastor of his father's church, Quinn Chapel AME Church in Chicago. He served through 1967, when he was named pastor emeritus.

In 1960 Carey addressed the World Methodist Council held in Oslo, Norway that year, discussing how AME activists in the United States drew from Wesleyan theology and praxis in their approach. He noted that they were inspired by the work of Richard Allen, the founder and first bishop of the AME Church. He was among numerous AME clergy and members who were active in the civil rights movement, but the institution as a whole at the time did not strongly embrace activism.

== Honors ==
At a luncheon held on November 4, 1955, at Chicago's Conrad Hilton Hotel, Carey and George B. McKibbin were both honored as knights commander of the Liberian Humane Order of African Redemption, with the honors being presented to them by Ambassador from Liberia Clarence Lorenzo Simpson in recognition of their contributions towards promoting positive Liberia–United States relations.

== Family ==
Archibald J. Carey Jr. was married to Hazel Harper. They had a daughter, Carolyn Eloise. Grandchildren: Renee, Jennifer, Nicole, William, Archibald James, Christopher.

He died on April 20, 1981, in Chicago.

== See also ==
- List of Chicago aldermen since 1923
