= Municipal Court of Chicago =

Court in Illinois, United States (1837–39, 1906-64)

- Established: 1837 (first court), 1906 (second court)
- Dissolved: 1839 (first court), 1964 (second court)
- Jurisdiction: Chicago, Illinois
- Location: Chicago, Illinois, United States
- Composition method: Non-partisan election
- Authorised by: Illinois General Assembly
- Appeals from: Justice of the peace courts (second court)
- Judge term length: 2, 4, and 6 years (second court)
- Number of positions: 1 chief justice and 27 associate justices (second court)

The Municipal Court of Chicago was the name of two municipal courts that existed at separate times in the history of the City of Chicago. These courts played crucial roles in the local judicial system, addressing both civil and criminal matters within the city.

== History ==
=== Municipal Court of Chicago (1837–1839) ===
The first Municipal Court of Chicago was formed in 1837 by the same act of the Government of Illinois that incorporated the City of Chicago. It was a court of general civil and criminal jurisdiction, operating concurrently with the Circuit Court in the city. The court was part of an effort to create a more organized and efficient judicial system for the rapidly growing city. However, it was abolished in 1839, just two years after its establishment, due to the reorganization of the judicial system.

=== Municipal Court of Chicago (1906–1964) ===
In 1904, an amendment to the Illinois Constitution empowered the Illinois General Assembly to "pass any law (local, special or general) providing a scheme or charter of local municipal government for the territory now or hereafter embraced within the limits of the city of Chicago," and stated that, "in case the General Assembly shall create municipal courts in the city of Chicago, it may abolish the offices of justices of the peace, police magistrates, and constables in and for the territory within said city.” Soon after, an association known as the Chicago Charter Convention elected a committee to draft and push the passage of an act establishing municipal courts in the City of Chicago. A Municipal Court Act was passed by the General Assembly and was signed by Governor Charles S. Deneen on May 18, 1905. It was ratified by voters of Chicago on November 7, 1905. The court had jurisdiction over civil claims for money or property, as well as non-felony criminal cases. Further legislation was passed in 1906 and 1907 to expand the court's capabilities and jurisdiction.

On November 6, 1906, an election was held to elect a chief justice and 27 associate justices. To provide for staggered future elections, the race saw separate elections divided by the duration of terms, with separate elections being held for sets of two-year, four-year, and six-year seats.

The court commenced operation on December 3, 1906. It was seen as the first of its kind in the United States, and a model for many other municipal courts. To accommodate the new court temporarily, the Municipal Courts Building was constructed on Michigan Avenue.

The creation of the court replaced the city's justice of the peace courts and removed the city from the jurisdiction of the remaining suburban justice of the peace courts in Cook County.

=== Significance and operations ===
The Municipal Court of Chicago was significant not only for its jurisdiction over various types of cases but also for its role in judicial reform. It aimed to provide a more efficient and organized system for handling legal matters in a rapidly growing urban area. The court handled a wide array of cases, including civil claims, misdemeanors, and small claims, providing a crucial service to the residents of Chicago.

=== Dissolution ===
A 1964 amendment to the Illinois Constitution reorganized the courts of Illinois, and the Municipal Court of Chicago ceased to exist, with it and Cook County's other 161 courts being folded into the Cook County Circuit Court.
