= Patrick Nash =

Political boss in Chicago (1863–1943)

Patrick Austin Nash
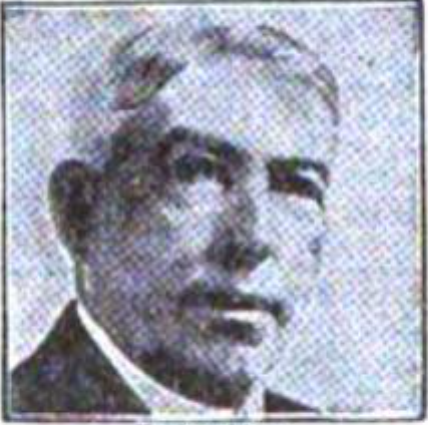

Chairman of the Cook County Democratic Party
- In office 1931–1943
- Preceded by: Anton Cermak
- Succeeded by: Edward J. Kelly

Member of the Cook County Board of Review
- In office 1918–1922 Serving with Edward R. Listinger and C. V. Barrett

Personal details
- Born: March 2, 1863 Chicago, Illinois, U.S.
- Died: October 6, 1943 (aged 80) Chicago, Illinois, U.S.
- Party: Democratic
- Spouse: Mary Kelley Nash
- Children: John, Thomas, Mary Ross

Patrick A. Nash (March 2, 1863 – October 6, 1943) was a political boss in the early and mid-twentieth century in Chicago and Cook County. He was in large part responsible for consolidating elements of the Cook County Democratic Party into a political machine. He evolved from a local sewage contractor to a political boss by carefully selecting his political allies. His prominence stems from the death of Anton Cermak and his political career is intertwined with that of Edward Joseph Kelly. The success of this machine was attributed to its decision to be more inclusive than its predecessors. This meant that Nash had success at dealing with a variety of politicians such as William L. Dawson.

== Early life ==
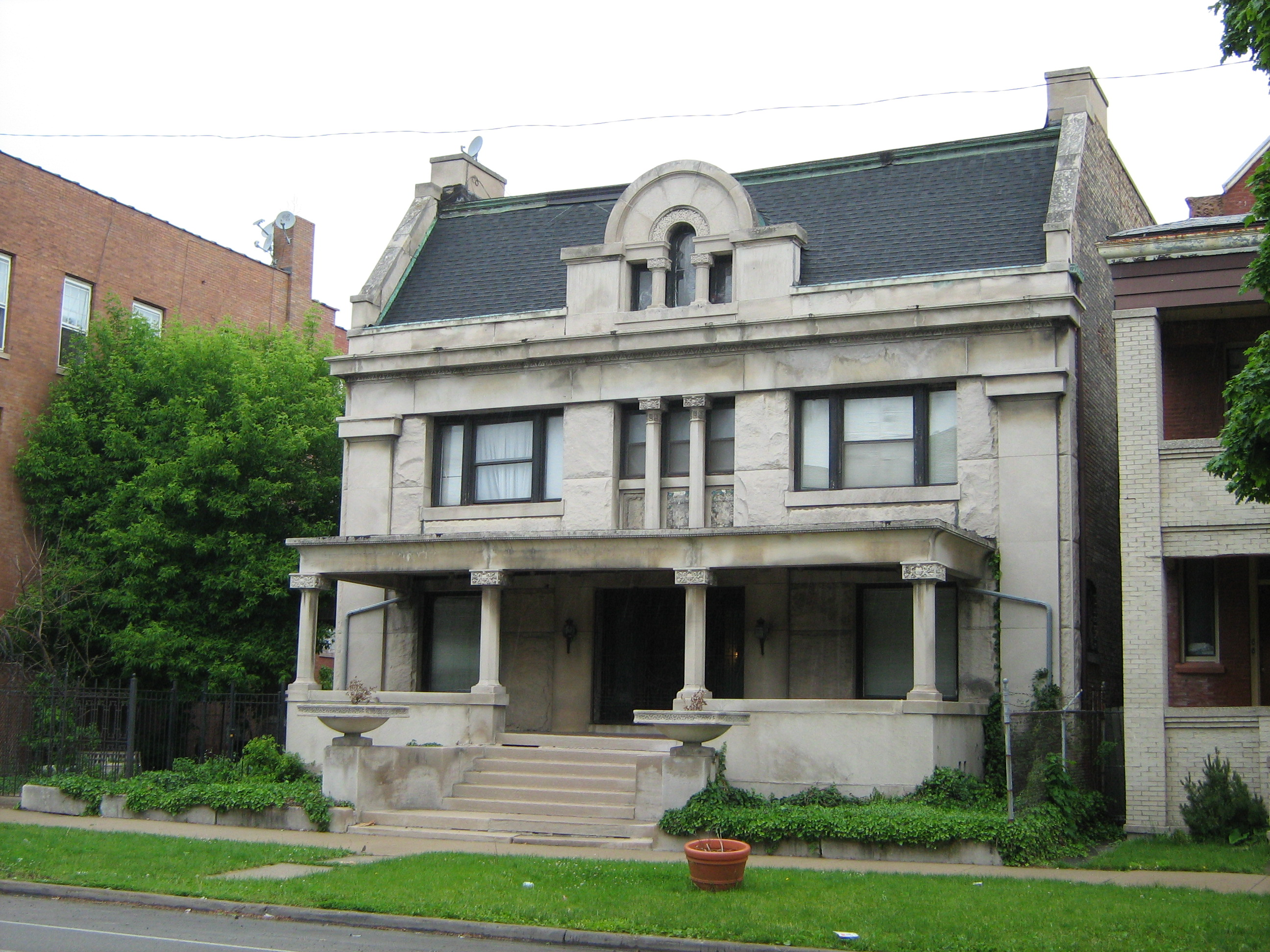
King-Nash House, residence of Patrick Nash from 1925 to 1943.

Nash was born on Chicago's Rush Street, near Delaware Place. When he was six, his family moved to the West Side of Chicago. However, it is his final residential address for the King-Nash House at 3234 West Washington Boulevard where he lived from 1925 until 1943 that became a Chicago Landmark.

He became a ward committeeman under Roger Sullivan, an earlier Chicago political boss. At the same time, Nash and his brother Richard formed Nash Brothers, a contractor company that specialized in sewer building. The company remained in place for more than 40 years and earned more than $14 million from work for the Chicago Sanitary district. Edward Joseph Kelly was the chief engineer of the Sanitary district in the 1920s under Nash's patronage. In 1925, city contracts for Nash Brothers resulted in Nash having one of the ten highest incomes in the city of Chicago.

== Political rise ==
Nash was active in Chicago politics from the early twentieth century. He was first appointed to political office in 1915, when he served on the Cook County Board of Assessors. Three years later, he was elected to the Cook County Board of Review, which set tax valuations. He ran for reelection in 1924, supported by the Chicago teachers' union, but lost in an election in which the Democrats were swept from office by the Republicans, and never ran for public office again. Nash did continue to run for Democratic party offices and served as a ward committeeman for the 14th Ward and later for the 28th Ward.

A close ally of Anton Cermak, when Cermak was elected Mayor of Chicago in 1931, he asked Nash to become Cook County Democratic Party Chairman. Nash was said to have represented the professional, and less narrowly ethnic, wing of the Irish contingent, which would help him to expand the party base. Nash held the position from 1931 until his death in 1943.

== Kelly-Nash Machine ==
Stretching back to its early beginnings, Chicago had had a long two-party political history that prevented either party from developing a political machine. Republicans usually won at the national level, while Democrats usually won the majority of local contests. However, both political parties experienced enough internal struggles to be thwarted from establishing dominance because factionalism abounded in the party. Chicago's first political machines rose under Chicago Mayor Anton Cermak in 1928 after the death of George Brennan.

Nash's period of domination in Chicago began with Cermak's assassination in 1933. When Cermak died, Nash helped promote Frank J. Corr to be the acting mayor of Chicago. Nash and other party leaders lobbied for a change in the city charter which called for a special election in the case of the death of an incumbent mayor. With an expensive special election looming during the Great Depression, they struck a deal with the Republican-led state legislature to grant the Chicago City Council the authority to appoint a permanent mayor. Subsequently, Nash turned down his own appointment and instead arranged to have Edward Joseph Kelly appointed mayor.

The political machine Nash built up with Kelly's help survived until four years after Nash's death. Nash was viewed by politicians as fair and scrupulously honest. Part of their success was that they handed out jobs to ethnic groups across the European spectrum, rather than just to Chicago's Irish population. Nash and Kelly began to integrate Blacks into Chicago's political process.

In 1942, William L. Dawson consolidated a black political organization that stayed loyal to the Democrats until his death in 1970. Nash provided financial resources and Kelly served as its front.

In 1934 Raymond S. McKeough began the first of four terms as the Democratic Congressman from Illinois' 2nd District. He gained the support of Nash and the Cook County Democratic Party for the original nomination.

In 1940, Nash offered his support to Louie Lewis, who was running for lieutenant governor in the Democratic primary. After Nash announced his support, a longtime friend of his, State Senator George M. Maypole, told Nash that he was planning on running against Lewis in the primary. Nash informed Maypole that as he had already given his word to Lewis, he would continue to support Lewis in the primary. Although Lewis defeated Maypole, he went on to lose in the general election and rumors persisted that Nash's support and efforts were not wholehearted. In an attempt to quell those rumors, Nash ordered that Maypole be "purged" when he was up for re-election in 1942 and Maypole lost to Norman Barry in that year's primary.

Following Nash's death in Chicago in 1943, he was succeeded as Cook County Democratic Chairman by Ed Kelly, who was succeeded by Jacob M. Arvey

== Personal life ==
Nash was a fan of horse racing, and owned a stables, Shannon Farm. In addition, he owned a horse farm in the Bluegrass region of Kentucky, where he raised horses to be raced.

== Further reading. ==
- Pacyga, Dominic A. Clout City: The Rise and Fall of the Chicago Political Machine (U of Chicago Press, 2025) online
