= Edward Joseph Kelly =

American politician

- Kelly, circa 1934

46th Mayor of Chicago
- In office April 17, 1933 – April 15, 1947
- Preceded by: Anton Cermak; Frank J. Corr (acting)
- Succeeded by: Martin H. Kennelly

Chairman of the Cook County Democratic Party
- In office 1943–1946
- Preceded by: Patrick Nash
- Succeeded by: Jacob Arvey

6th President of the United States Conference of Mayors
- In office 1945–1947
- Preceded by: Fiorello La Guardia
- Succeeded by: George W. Welsh

Personal details
- Born: Edward Joseph Kelly; May 1, 1876 Chicago, Illinois, United States.
- Died: October 20, 1950 (aged 74) Chicago, Illinois, U.S.
- Resting place: Calvary Cemetery
- Party: Democratic
- Spouse(s): Mary E. Roche (m. 1910; died 1918) Margaret E. Kirk (m. 1922–1950)
- Children: 4

Edward Joseph Kelly (May 1, 1876 – October 20, 1950) was an American politician who served as the 46th Mayor of Chicago from April 17, 1933, until April 15, 1947.

Prior to being mayor of Chicago, Kelly served as chief engineer of the Chicago Sanitary District during the 1920s.

A 1994 survey of experts on Chicago politics assessed Kelly as one of the ten best mayors in the city's history (up to that time). (Note: The others in the top-ten were Anton Cermak (mayor 1931–33); Richard J. Daley (mayor 1955–76); Richard M. Daley (then-incumbent mayor since 1989); Edward Fitzsimmons Dunne (mayor 1905–07); Carter Harrison III (mayor 1879–1887 and 1893); Carter Harrison IV (mayor 1897–1905 and 1911–15); William B. Ogden (mayor 1837–38); Harold Washington (mayor 1983–87); John Wentworth (mayor 1857–58 and 1860–61))

== Early life and career ==
Born to Stephen, a police officer and Helen (née Lang) Kelly, he was the first of five Chicago mayors from Bridgeport of Chicago's South Side. He did not complete grammar school but entered the labor force at age ten.

Kelly was the chief engineer of the Chicago Sanitary District in the 1920s. He was sponsored by Patrick Nash, the owner of a sewer-contracting company that did millions of dollars of business with the city.

== Political career ==
=== President of the South Park Commission ===
In March 1924, Kelly became president of the South Park Commission. Upon his election he declared the end to an era of "Deenen Republicans", a faction of South Side Republicans allied with Robert R. McCormick which had lost control of the South Park Commission in the March 1924 municipal elections.

He presided over the completion and opening of Soldier Field, which was built and operated by the South Park Commission.

Kelly organized many public ceremonies and events hosted by the venue. He made the venue the site of fundraisers and other events for charities and organizations which were supported by the Democratic Party.

=== Mayor of Chicago (1933–1947) ===
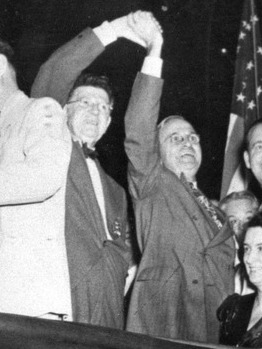
Kelly with Harry S. Truman after Truman was nominated for vice president at the 1944 Democratic National Convention in Chicago

Following the assassination of Mayor Anton Cermak, Kelly was hand-picked by his friend, Patrick Nash, Chairman of the Cook County Democratic Party, to be the Democratic-backed candidate in the City Council's vote on a successor for Cermak. Together, Kelly and Nash built one of the most powerful, and most corrupt, big-city political organizations, called the "Kelly-Nash Machine".

Kelly was mayor during the 1933–34 Chicago World's Fair (Century of Progress), which took place during the Great Depression and included the first official Major League Baseball All-Star Game; Kelly initiated the idea of holding a major sporting event for the fair to the Chicago Tribune. Kelly was famous for banning Nelson Algren's 1942 novel Never Come Morning from the Chicago Public Library; the ban remained in force for decades due to the outcry by Chicago Polonia upon its release.

From 1945 until 1947, Kelly served as president of the United States Conference of Mayors.

In 1937, the city received a grant and loan from the Works Progress Administration to begin construction on subways, with a groundbreaking being held December 17, 1938 for the city's first subway. The WPA funding would only partially cover the total cost of the subway (ultimately working out to 3/4 of the total cost). Kelly was also able to obtain WPA financing for projects such as a refurbishment of Midway Airport and roadway improvements.

In 1945, the National Education Association released a report on Chicago Public Schools that deeply condemned the politicization of its administration and of unethical practices by its leadership. In response to this, in March 1946, North Central Association of Colleges and Secondary Schools threatened to revoke its accreditation of the city's public high schools. On April 1, 1946, Mayor Kelly created an advisory committee to address the problems in the Chicago Public Schools. The committee was led by Henry Townley Heald, and Kelly pledged that he would follow the recommendations that the committee would issue. The committee approved a majority decision on June 18, 1946, which made recommendations to change the laws dictating the administration of Chicago Public School and called for the resignations superintendent of Chicago Public Schools William Johnson and the entirety of the Chicago Board of Education. Kelly accepted all of the recommendations of the committee except their recommendation that the entire school board resign. However, in the wake of this controversy, many school board members did resign. The individuals to fill the vacancies were selected through recommendations issued by the advisory committee led by Heald. Ultimately, board President James B. McCahey would retire from the board in May 1947. Kelly's successor, Martin H. Kennelly, would keep the practice of having a screening committee recommend individuals to be appointed to the Chicago Board of Education.

During Kelly's tenure, the city was finally able to unify public transit with the establishment of the Chicago Transit Authority.

A 1994 survey of experts on Chicago politics saw Kelly ranked as one of the ten best mayors in the city's history (up to that time).

==== End of tenure ====
In 1947, Kelly acquiesced to the Cook County Democratic Party's decision to slate a candidate with reform credentials for mayor of Chicago, and was succeeded by Martin H. Kennelly.

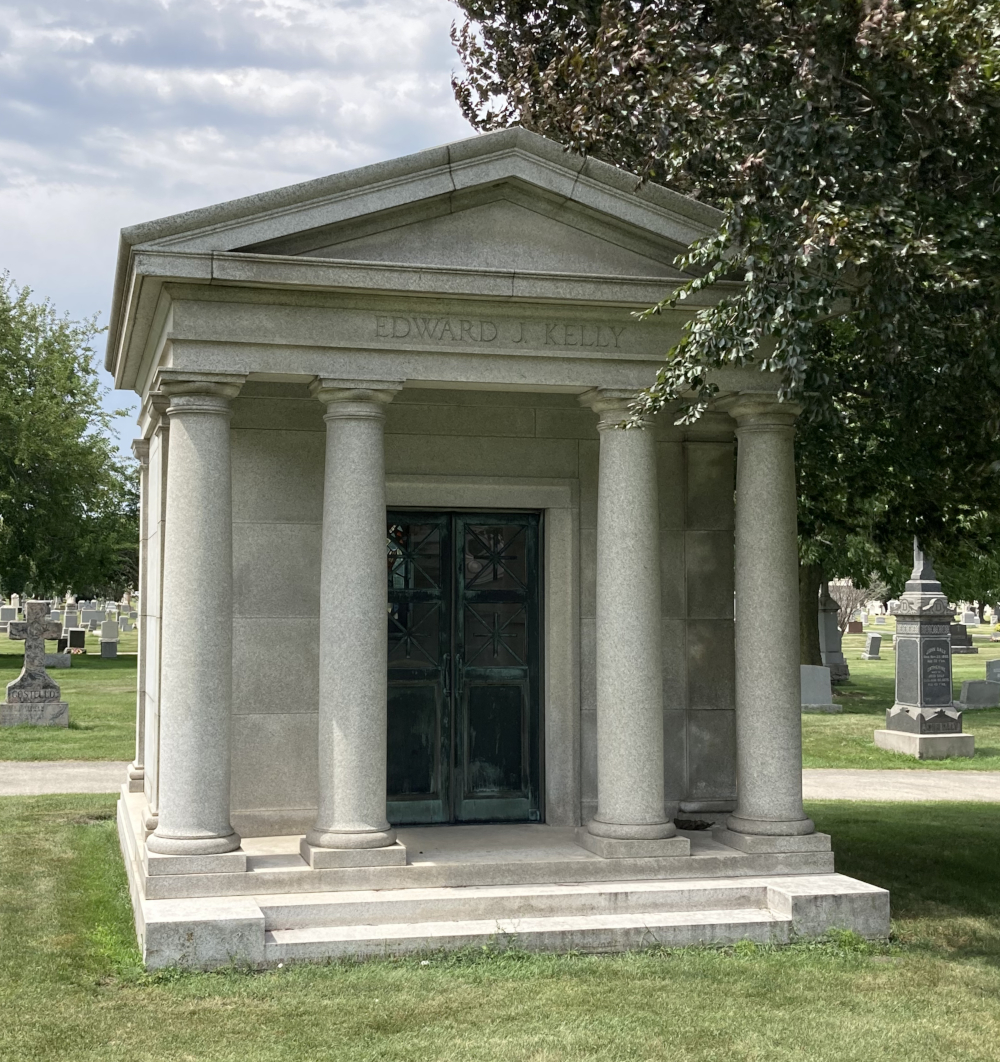
Kelly mausoleum at Calvary Cemetery

Kelly was serving as Democratic National Committeeman from Illinois at the time of his death.

== Death ==
Kelly died in 1950 at age 74 and was interred in Calvary Cemetery in Evanston, Illinois.

== See also ==
- Timeline of Chicago, 1930s-1940s

== Notes ==
Political offices
Preceded by Frank J. Corr	Mayor of Chicago; 1933–1947	Succeeded by Martin H. Kennelly
