= Daniel Ryan =

Dan, Daniel or Danny Ryan may refer to:

- Daniel Ryan (figure skater) (died 1961), American ice dancer who competed with partner Carol Ann Peters
- Daniel Ryan (actor) (born 1968), English actor and writer
- Daniel Ryan Sr., American politician
- Daniel L. Ryan (1930–2015), American prelate of the Roman Catholic Church
- Daniel J. Ryan (1855–1923), Republican politician in Ohio
- Dan Ryan Jr. (1894–1961), American politician
- Dan Ryan (electronic sports player) (born 1986), American electronic sports player
- Daniel Ryan (Tasmanian politician) (1870–1953), Australian politician
- Daniel Joseph Ryan, American politician in the Massachusetts House of Representatives
- Dan Ryan (netball) (born 1984), Australian netball player, coach, sports journalist and broadcaster
- Daniel Ryan (Queensland politician) (1865–1952), member of the Queensland Legislative Assembly
- Danny Ryan (1870–1966), Irish hurler
- Dan Ryan (Oregon politician) (born 1962/63), Portland, Oregon city councilor

== See also ==
- Dan Ryan branch, section of the Chicago L system
- Dan Ryan Expressway, a Chicago road named after Dan Ryan, Jr
- Dan Ryan Woods, a Chicago forest preserve in South Side, Chicago
- Daniel Bryan (born 1981), American wrestler
- Daniel Bryan (Virginia politician) (1789–1866), American politician
