= Pineapple Primary =

1928 election in Illinois, marked by violence

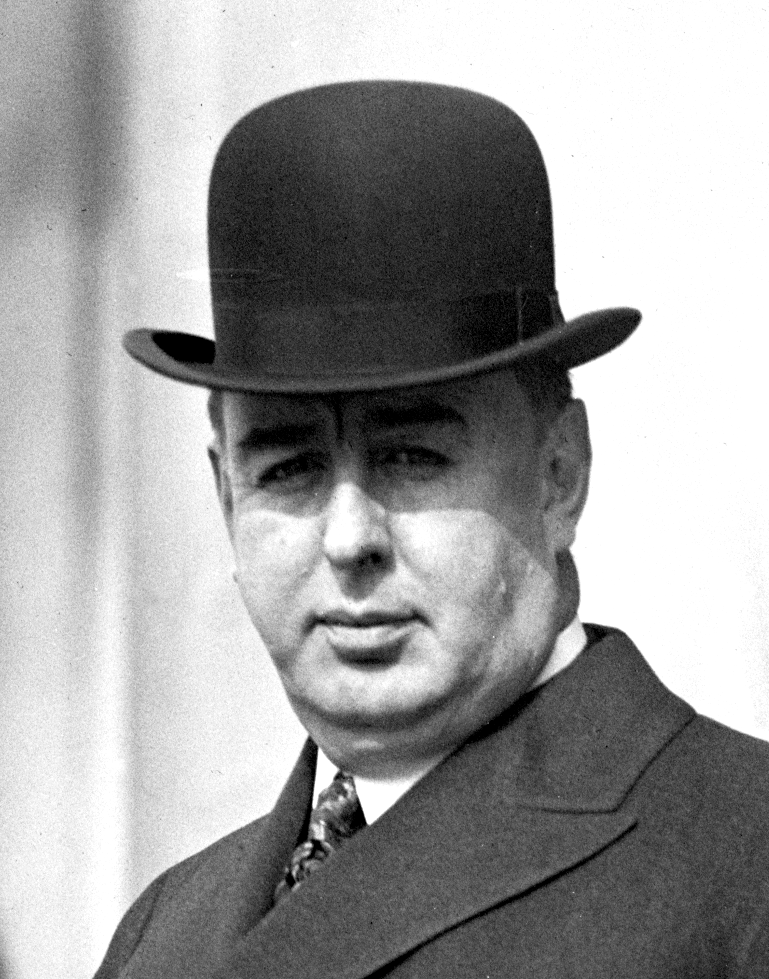
Chicago Mayor William Hale Thompson accepted campaign contributions from gangster Al Capone. Thompson led the faction that supported lax enforcement of Prohibition in the Illinois 1928 Republican campaign

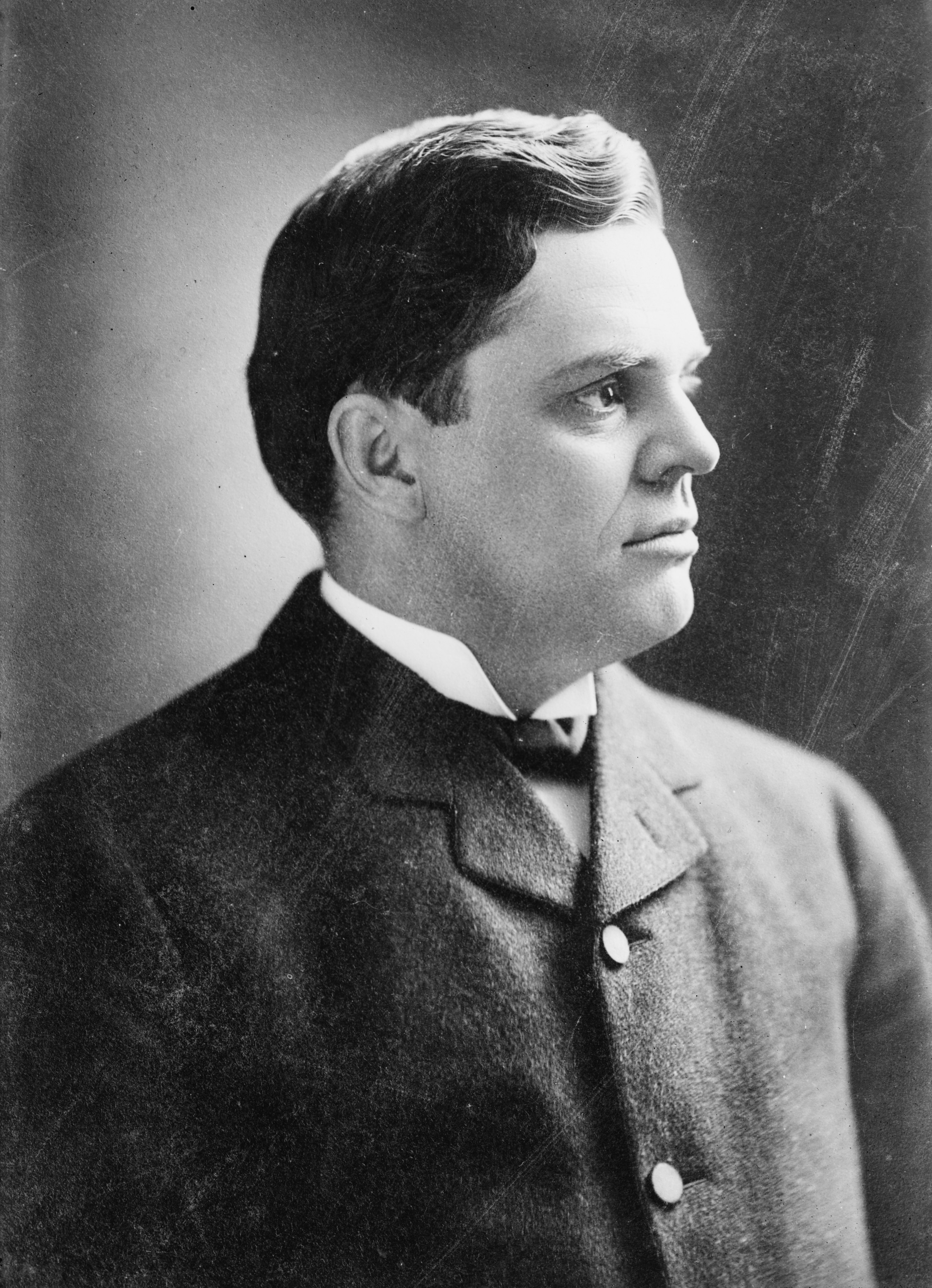
U.S. Senator Charles S. Deneen, a former state representative and governor, opposed Thompson's slate. Deneen led the reformist faction in the Illinois 1928 Republican campaign

The Pineapple Primary was the name given to the primary election held in Illinois on April 10, 1928. The campaign was marked by numerous acts of violence, mostly in Chicago and elsewhere in Cook County. In the six months prior to the primary election, 62 bombings took place in the city, and at least two politicians were killed. The term "Pineapple Primary" originates with the contemporary slang term "pineapple" to describe a hand grenade.

Underlying the violent campaign was the lucrative Prohibition-era bootlegging trade, a corrupt city government, politicians with ties to organized crime, and a deep-seated and bitter political rivalry between several of the Illinois Republican candidates. The threat of election day violence was so severe that Chicago's U.S. Marshal requested the U.S. Attorney General for authority to deputize 500 additional federal marshals to assure the electorate to cast their ballots in safety.

== Background ==
The Pineapple Primary took place in 1928, during the administration of the notoriously corrupt Chicago Mayor William Hale ("Big Bill") Thompson, a Republican. Thompson had served two corruption-marred terms as mayor in 1915 and 1919. Following exposure of several scandals tied to his political organization, Thompson sat out the 1923 contest, with the result that reformer William E. Dever, a Democrat, was elected mayor.

After four years away from City Hall, Thompson cast his hat into the ring for the 1927 mayoral campaign, capitalizing on public displeasure with the zealous enforcement of the Prohibition laws under Dever. The always-bombastic Thompson campaigned for a wide open town, at one time hinting that he'd reopen illegal saloons closed by Dever's police. Such a proclamation helped Thompson's campaign gain the support of mobster Al Capone. Thompson's campaign allegedly accepted a contribution of $250,000 ($4,514,847 in 2024) from the gangster. In the 1927 mayoral race, Thompson beat Dever by a relatively slim margin.

Once he returned to City Hall in the spring of 1927, Thompson turned the city's resources away from fighting the bootleggers, and toward fighting those who advocated reforming the city government.

== The competing factions ==
"Big Bill" Thompson was the leader of one faction of the state Republican Party. Leading the opposition to the Thompson camp was former Governor and incumbent U.S. Senator Charles Deneen. Thompson and Deneen had been rivals for control of the Illinois Republican Party, and the bad blood between the two politicians dated at least as far back as the 1904 state convention.

Republican candidates for key offices in the 1928 Illinois primary election
Office	Thompson candidate	Deneen candidate
United States Senate	Frank L. Smith, twice denied his seat by the Senate	Otis F. Glenn, downstate attorney
Governor	Len Small, two-term incumbent	Louis Emmerson, Secretary of State
State's Attorney for Cook County	Robert E. Crowe, incumbent	John A. Swanson, Cook County Circuit Court judge

Neither Thompson nor Deneen themselves were standing for election to their respective offices during the 1928 campaign. Deneen's faction was considered less corrupt than the Thompson faction, but Thompson's faction had the advantage of his Cook County political organization. At the time of the campaign, Thompson's political organization controlled every office in the city, county, and state governments except for one municipal clerkship and the office of Secretary of State, the latter seat held by Emmerson.

The State's Attorney for Cook County prosecutes public corruption cases in Cook County. Thompson threatened to resign if Crowe lost the state's attorney. "I don't have to stand this abuse," Thompson quipped. Most of Chicago's newspapers, however, urged for Crowe's defeat, one news account describing his office as "the overlordship of Chicago crime and vice."

The Deneen faction charged that Thompson and Crowe had done little to combat crime, observing that none of the bombings had led to a conviction, and none of the shotgun or machine gun murders during the months prior to the election had been solved. Deneen's forces proclaimed that, if elected, they would improve conditions in Chicago. Small, Thompson, and Crowe, accused the Deneen faction of exaggerating the amount of crime, and accused their opponents of setting bombs in their own homes, and for sending Federal prohibition agents to Chicago to discredit Thompson.

Most of Chicago's newspapers supported the reformers in the Deneen faction. Some out-of-town papers were less sanguine; The Washington Post lamented that the primary was fundamentally a choice between "which particular gang [was] going to harvest the $100 million a year of graft" flowing from liquor bootlegging and gambling.

The Democrats had few primary contests during the 1928 election, and contented themselves with a few jabs at the Republicans. They were generally considered to have little to lose, given the enmity and strife taking place in the Republican campaign.

== Esposito slaying ==
On March 21, Giuseppe "Diamond Joe" Esposito was shot and killed on the street near his home at 800 S. Oakley Blvd. Esposito was the Republican ward committeeman for the 25th Ward, a leader of his ward's Italian community, and was linked to organized crime. According to contemporary accounts, Esposito was reputed to provide protection for gamblers and was tied to bootlegging as well as shootings and bombings, but also Esposito had friends among the city and state governments.

Esposito had received repeated warnings that he was marked for death unless he fled Chicago. Esposito was struck down after a day of campaigning within sight of his home while in the company of his bodyguards. While passing the house at 806 S. Oakley Blvd., a volley of shots rang out from a passing automobile. The shots were heard by Esposito's wife, who ran the hundred feet from her home to the side of her dying husband. Two double-barrel shotguns and a revolver were found at the crime scene.

Neither of his bodyguards were struck – they dropped to the ground at the first sound of shots – and police suspected that Esposito may have been set up by his bodyguards. Shortly after Esposito's slaying, a witness to the murder was found shot to death. The bodyguards were interrogated and released, and no one was ever charged with Esposito's killing.

== Deneen and Swanson bombings ==
On the night of March 26, a bomb went off at Senator Deneen's residence at 457 W. 61st Place, damaging the front porch and breaking windows in the Deneen house and elsewhere in the vicinity. Deneen was not home at the time of the blast, having departed for Washington, D.C. by train earlier in the day after attending Esposito's funeral. Deneen and Esposito were political allies despite Deneen's reputation as a political reformer and Esposito's ties to organized crime. Almost at the same time as the Deneen house was bombed, a bomb was thrown at the residence of State's Attorney candidate Swanson, a Deneen ally, at 7217 Crandon Ave. The bomb caused severe damage but narrowly missed Swanson.

In the aftermath of the bombing, Senator Deneen stated from Washington that the bombings were "the work of organized and protected [criminals] ... in their desperate effort to retain political control." State's Attorney Crowe responded that he was satisfied that the "bombings were done by Deneen forces, and done mainly to discredit Mayor Thompson and myself."

== Response to the violence ==
As the violence heightened, the focus of the voters turned to crime and Prohibition. Chicago's violent campaign drew attention and scorn from out-of-town newspapers. In the days before the election, a Federal grand jury was sworn in with instructions that it would be called upon to protect the voters of Chicago under the federal statutes about intimidation or conspiracy to prevent a citizen from exercising his right to vote. Special federal Prohibition officers swarmed into the city after the Deneen and Swanson bombings, and a city court bailiff who was a Thompson supporter was shot and wounded by a federal agent during a raid on a saloon.

Under a finding by the Illinois Supreme Court, election judges were ruled as officers of the county court, and that any election judge who tampered with votes or intimidated voters could be jailed for contempt. Under the same court decision, some 3,000 persons drawn from the ranks of the local bar association and other civic organizations were deputized as pollwatchers, and were empowered to compel a policeman to arrest anyone involved in vote fraud. The same ruling deprived Governor Small from the power to pardon politicians arrested under this contempt ruling. This unprecedented ruling was estimated to have the potential to cut the stolen votes from about 75,000 to 25,000 within Cook County.

== Granady murder ==
On the day of the primary, Octavius C. Granady, a candidate for committeeman in the 20th ward, was chased in his car and killed. He was an Afro Caribbean attorney from St. Thomas, United States Virgin Islands who was running on a reform platform.

== Outcome ==
The voters sided with Deneen's slate, with all three of his candidates winning the Primary. Louis Emmerson defeated Len Small by 400,000 votes and went on to win the Governor's office. John Swanson defeated Crowe by 120,000. The Tribune attributed his win to Democrats crossing over to vote Republican following the earlier bombings. Otis Glenn defeated Small for the Senate seat. Glenn's victory spelled the end of Smith's convoluted attempts to be seated in the Senate following an earlier appointment that the Senate denied.

== See also ==
- 1928 United States Senate special election in Illinois
