= 1928 United States Senate special election in Illinois =

- November 6, 1928
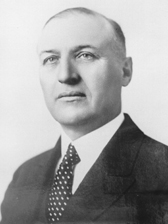

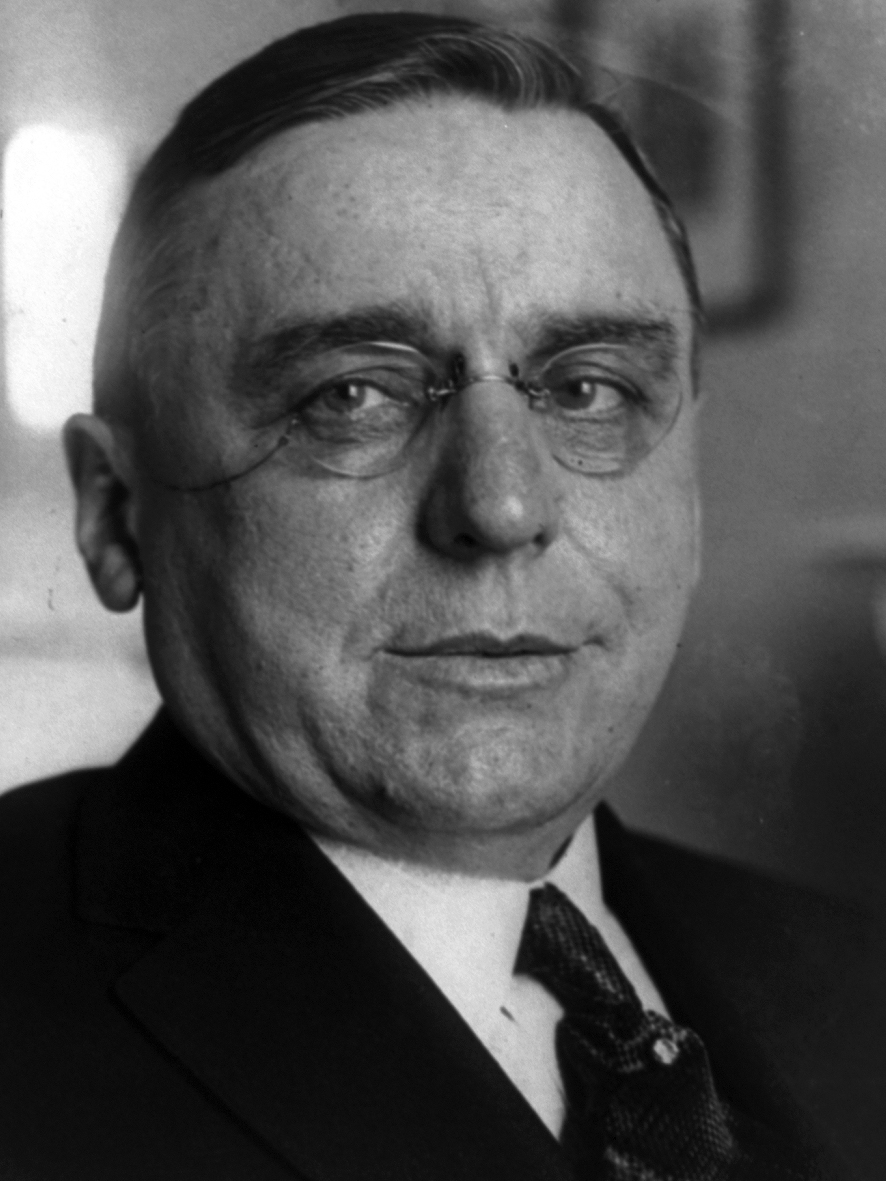
Nominee	Otis F. Glenn	Anton Cermak
Party	Republican	Democratic
Popular vote	1,594,031	1,315,338
Percentage	54.46%	44.94%
- County results Glenn: 40–50% 50–60% 60–70% 70–80% 80–90% Cermak: 50–60% 60–70%
U.S. senator before election
Vacant
Elected U.S. senator
Otis F. Glenn
Republican

The 1928 United States Senate special election in Illinois took place on November 6, 1928. The election was held due to the U.S. Senate's refusal to seat 1926 election winner, Republican Frank L. Smith, due to allegations of election fraud. The election saw the election of Republican Otis F. Glenn.

The primaries and general election coincided with those for federal elections (president and House) and those for state elections. Primaries were held April 10, 1928.

== Democratic primary ==
=== Candidates ===
- Anton Cermak, president of the Cook County Board of Commissioners
- James O. Monroe, attorney and perennial candidate

=== Results ===
Democratic primary
Party	Candidate	Votes	%
Democratic	A. J. Cermak	176,750	71.32
Democratic	James O. Monroe	71,068	28.68
Write-in	Others	3	0.00
Total votes		247,821	100

== Republican primary ==
=== Candidates ===
- Otis F. Glenn, former Illinois state senator
- Frank L. Smith, unseated winner of 1926 U.S. Senate election

=== Campaign ===
The Illinois Republican primaries of 1928 were plagued with electoral violence, and were dubbed the "Pineapple Primary".

Chicago mayor William Hale Thompson backed Smith for Senate, while Charles S. Deneen, who held Illinois' other U.S. Senate seat, backed Glenn. Thompson and Deneen controlled rival factions of the state's Republican Party. Thompson's faction was vastly dominant at the time.

=== Results ===
Republican primary
Party	Candidate	Votes	%
Republican	Otis F. Glenn	611,897	63.26
Republican	Frank L. Smith	355,356	36.74
Write-in	Others	3	0.00
Total votes		967,256	100

== General election ==
1928 United States Senate special election in Illinois
Party	Candidate	Votes	%
Republican	Otis F. Glenn	1,594,031	54.46
Democratic	A. J. Cermak	1,315,338	44.94
Socialist	George Ross Kirkpatrick	13,002	0.44
Workers	Max Bedacht	3,177	0.11
Socialist Labor	G. A. Jenning	1,463	0.05
Majority		278,693	9.52
Turnout		2,927,011	

== See also ==
- 1928 United States Senate elections
