= De La Salle Institute =

Catholic secondary school in Chicago

- Transforming Lives since 1680

Location
- 3434 South Michigan Avenue; Chicago, Illinois 60616; United States; 41.83144°N 87.624474°W

Information
- Type: Private, Parochial, Catholic, Co-educational Secondary education institution
- Motto: Latin: Signum Fidei; English: Sign of Faith
- Religious affiliations: Catholic Church (De La Salle Christian Brothers)
- Established: 1889; 137 years ago
- Founder: Brother Adjutor of Mary, FSC
- Status: Open
- Oversight: Archdiocese of Chicago
- President: Mike Zunica
- Chairman: Steven Burrows
- Principal: Thomas Schergen
- Grades: 9–12
- Enrollment: 751 (2024)
- Average class size: 25
- Student to teacher ratio: 25:1
- Campus size: 4 acres
- Campus type: Urban
- Colors: Royal blue and Gold
- Slogan: Enter to Learn, Leave to Serve
- Fight song: De La Salle Men
- Athletics conference: CCL GCAC; IHSA
- Mascot: Meteors
- Team name: Meteors
- Accreditation: North Central Association of Colleges and Schools
- Newspaper: The Victory
- Tuition: US$15,050
- Affiliation: Institute of the Brothers of the Christian Schools
- Website: http://www.dls.org/

De La Salle Institute is a private, Catholic, coeducational high school run by the Institute of the Brothers of the Christian Schools in the Bronzeville neighborhood on the South Side of Chicago, Illinois. It was founded by Brother Adjutor of the De La Salle Brothers in 1889.

The school is considered a historic institution on Chicago's South Side. It is located three blocks east of Rate Field, the home of MLB's Chicago White Sox. While located in the historic Bronzeville neighborhood, it has very strong ties to the nearby Bridgeport neighborhood. The school is separated from Bridgeport and Rate Field by the Dan Ryan Expressway.

While coming from a commemorative book published by the school, the authors of American Pharaoh:Mayor Richard J. Daley: His Battle for Chicago and the Nation note the following about the school's impact on the history of Chicago:

"The Battle of Waterloo was won on the playing fields of Eton" but "the business leaders of Chicago were trained in the Counting Rooms of De La Salle."

== History ==
De La Salle Institute was founded by Brother Adjutor, a former director of St. Patrick High School, in 1889, after being chartered by the State of Illinois the previous year. The laying of the cornerstone on May 19, 1889 was a major event which began with an hour-long parade through the streets of Chicago. The ceremony was presided over by Archbishop Patrick Feehan, the first archbishop of the Archdiocese of Chicago. Classes and graduation ceremonies were held elsewhere until the building was complete, opening for students on 7 September 1891.

The school started as a two-year commercial school. The area which the school catered to was a poor area of the city, and many of the students were children of recent immigrants. As Br. Adjutor was quoted to have said: I made up my mind to leave nothing undone in the direction of fitting the boys of the masses for the battle of life, morally as well as educationally. As times changed, the school grew to emphasize a college preparatory curriculum.

On 11 April 1925, the school was severely damaged by an early morning fire causing US$35,000 in damage ($642,552 in 2025). Two of the four floors were lost.

1926 saw plans for the addition of a new gymnasium behind the school at a cost of US$100,000 ($1.82 million in 2025). These plans were later adjusted with a larger gym built on Michigan Avenue for US$175,000 (unadjusted).

The 1953–54 school year saw the school purchase the remainder of the block on which the school is situated. In March, ground breaking occurred for an addition to the school. In October 1955, ground was broken on an addition to the brothers' residence attached to the school.

By 1960, more room was needed to handle the increase in student population. A new addition was built north of the extant building, adding a gymnasium and more classrooms. Groundbreaking occurred in late September 1960, with the cornerstone being laid in June 1961. The US$850,000 ($9.05 million in 2025) addition was dedicated in May, 1962.

After decades of not having an outdoor sports stadium of its own, plans were made in 1967 to construct a stadium and sports complex. In a rare move, the fundraising for the stadium, estimated at US$250,000 ($2.41 million in 2025) was not headed by an alum, with the honorary chair of the development committee being given to George Halas, owner of the Chicago Bears.

In June 1984, with no more space for expansion, and the need for new facilities, the original four story school building was demolished.

The school has a history of diversity, dating back to its first class of nine students which included two Jewish students. Today roughly 28% of the school is African–American, 32% is Latino, and nearly 25% are non–Catholic.

In 2002, the school opened the Lourdes Hall Campus, a collaboration with the Sisters of St. Joseph of the Third Order of St. Francis. The school claims to be unique in the United States in that it is a co-educational institution, while still offering single-gender campuses.

== Academics ==
Coursework is divided into three areas: Social Sciences (which includes religious studies), Language Arts (which includes foreign languages and fine arts), and Applied Sciences (which includes the natural sciences, mathematics, and physical education). Students are required to take a minimum of six credits of course work for their freshman and sophomore years, and at least 5.5 credits as upperclassmen.

There are three program levels: Honors, College Preparatory, and General Studies.

Community service is required as a component of the religious studies courses, with the number of required hours dependent on the course and year in school. The service is a component of the course grade.

The following seven Advanced Placement courses are offered: U.S. History, Government and Politics, Spanish Language, French Language, Studio Art, English Literature, and Calculus (AB). There is also a course entitled "Honors Calculus BC" which is a follow-up for students who have taken AP Calculus AB, but is not offered as an AP course.

There are also technical courses offered at various levels (including honors) in electronics and small engines. A course in Computer System Management requires students to aid in computer maintenance at the school.

=== Tablet PC program ===
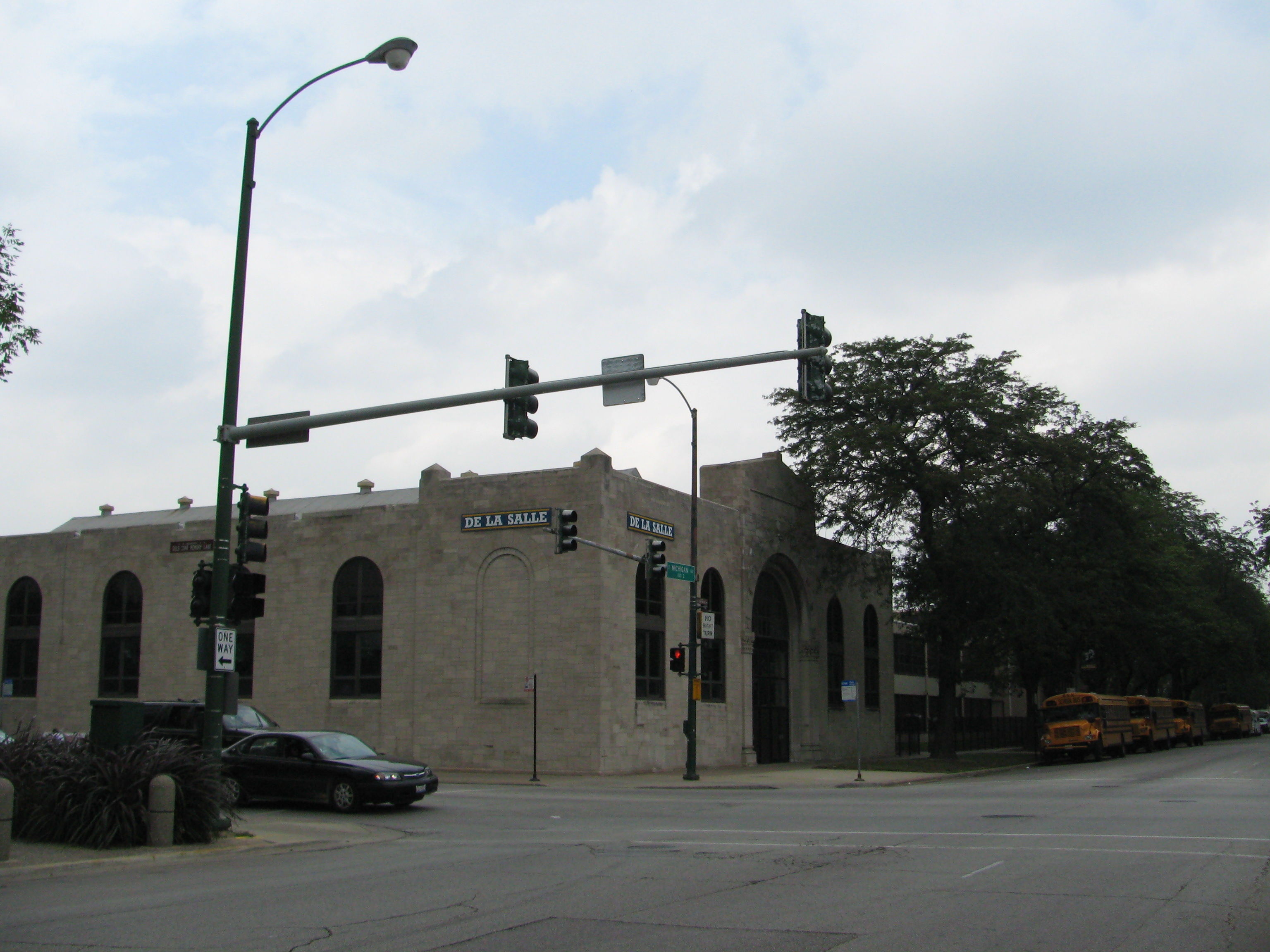
De La Salle Institute at the corner of 35th Street and Michigan Avenue

In 2006, De La Salle began requiring incoming freshmen to lease or purchase an IBM X41 Tablet PC. The Tablet PCs allow students to take notes electronically and make use of the included textbook in e-books. Both De La Salle campuses are equipped with a WiFi network, allowing teachers and students to wirelessly access the Internet and print to network printers. De La Salle also has a computer repair center at each campus to deal with any computer problems or malfunctions. This year (2024), they are using the Lenovo Thinkpad L13 Yoga.

=== The Tolton Center ===
The Tolton Center, is an adult education outreach program founded by De La Salle in 1991. Currently spread around to five locations, the Center provides classes for low-income adults on topics related to literacy and employment skills. Child services are also provided. While begun by the institute, the courses are non-religious in nature,[23]

== Extracurricular activities ==
=== Athletics ===
The De La Salle Meteors men's teams compete in the Chicago Catholic League (CCL), while the women's teams compete in the Girls Catholic Athletic Conference (GCAC). The school also competes in state championship tournaments sponsored by the Illinois High School Association (IHSA).

In 1961, De La Salle joined some schools in leaving the Chicago Catholic League in order to form a new conference (the Chicagoland Prep League) and participate in the IHSA. At the time, the Chicago Catholic League members were not IHSA members, and under IHSA guidelines, schools in the IHSA could not play schools outside the organization, nor could schools outside the organization compete for state championships.

The following teams have finished in the top four of their respective IHSA state tournaments:

- basketball (boys) •• 3rd place (1976–77)

In the era before De La Salle came under the auspices of the IHSA, De La Salle won a National Catholic Basketball Championship in 1928–1929, defeating St. Stanislaus High School of St. Louis, Missouri.

On October 24, 2008, De La Salle took part in Toyota Park's first ever American football game as opponents to Fenwick. De La Salle won the game, 17–10.

On February 22, 2014 the De La Salle basketball team won the first ever Inaugural Catholic League Tournament Championship against Mount Carmel High School with a score of 67–62.

=== Performing arts ===
The school offers an introductory course to learning a musical instrument, as a pathway for novice musicians to enter the concert band. The concert band is a full year course, with an honors option involving research in addition to performance.

In addition to courses in introductory and advanced Drama, students may participate in such activities as improvisation, stage combat, one act plays and slam poetry. During the second semester, students are in charge of directing their own plays, and in some cases, writing and producing them as well. Students who participate in the theater program for an extended amount of time may be inducted into the International Thespian Society.

=== Other non-athletic activities ===
De La Salle Institute offers 15 sports for boys and girls, as well as many clubs such as Mock Trial, Chess Club, Weight Lifting, Boxing, Guitar Club, Science Club, Spanish Club, French Club, Web Design, and Drama.

== Financial information ==
The tuition for the 2007–08 school year is US$9,125, however the school has an educational scholarship open to "most" domestic students, which is worth $1,825. The school also claims that about 55% of students receive additional financial aid through an application process.

Students must also have their own Tablet PC. There is the option to "lease-to-own" at $56–per–month for 46 months. There is also the option to purchase the computer outright at $2,200.

== Notable alumni ==
=== Government and politics ===
Five mayors of Chicago are among the alumni. For only ten years (1979–89) between 1947 and early 2011, has the Mayor of Chicago not been an alumnus of this school.

- Frank J. Corr (class of 1895) was the interim mayor for a few months in 1933 after the assassination of Mayor Anton Cermak by a bullet that was assumed to be intended for Franklin D. Roosevelt.
- Martin H. Kennelly (class of 1905) was mayor from 1947 to 1955. He was the first alum to be elected mayor. When he proved to be too "reform" oriented for the Democratic Party, Richard J. Daley was supported to run against him, defeating him in the primary election. Prior to being mayor, Kennelly briefly served as general chairman of the De La Salle Golden Jubilee fund campaign.
- Richard J. Daley (class of 1919) was mayor from 1955 to 1976, winning seven mayoral elections in total.
- Michael A. Bilandic (class of 1940) was mayor from 1976 to 1979. He was selected as interim mayor in the wake of Richard J. Daley's death, and subsequently won a special election to the office. In 1990, he was elected to a seat on the Illinois Supreme Court (serving 1990–2000, and as Chief Justice 1994–96)
- Richard M. Daley (class of 1960) was the mayor of Chicago from 1989 to 2011. He was the longest-serving mayor of Chicago, surpassing his father on December 26, 2010, and was succeeded by Rahm Emanuel the following year.

Others:

- Bernard Carey (class of 1952), politician who served as Cook County State's Attorney and a judge on the Circuit Court of Cook County
- George Dunne (class of 1931) was the longest-serving president of the Cook County Board (1969–90) after serving eight years in the Illinois House of Representatives.
- Morgan M. Finley served in the Illinois Senate from 1959 to 1967.
- Michael L. Igoe (class of 1903) was elected in 1934 to serve in the 74th United States Congress. He stepped down after less than six months to become the new U.S. Attorney for the Northern District of Illinois. After four years, he became a U.S. district judge.
- John W. Rainey (class of 1898) was a three-term Congressman (1918–23).
- Dan Ryan (class of 1912) served as President of Cook County Board from 1954 to 1961. The Dan Ryan Expressway a stretch of I-90/I-94 that runs through the south side of the city is named in his honor.

=== Sports and entertainment ===
- Curtis Blaydes, state champion wrestler; professional Mixed Martial Artist, current UFC Heavyweight Contender
- Brian Bogusevic (class of 2002), baseball player for Tulane University and was the No. 24 draft pick for Houston Astros in the 2005 MLB draft.
- Charles A. Comiskey II (class of 1944) was the only grandson of Charles Comiskey. From 1957 to 1959, he was president of the Chicago White Sox; the last member of the Comiskey family to preside over the organization.
- Jocko Conlan, Major League Baseball umpire 1941–65, umpired in five World Series, inducted to Baseball Hall of Fame, MLB player for (Chicago White Sox)
- George Connor (class of 1943) was the first winner of the Outland Trophy in 1946 as outstanding collegiate interior lineman (while playing for the University of Notre Dame). He spent most of his NFL career with the Chicago Bears, and was inducted into the Pro Football Hall of Fame as a member of the class of 1975.
- Bryant Gumbel (class of 1965) is a sports commentator and television news personality.
- Greg Gumbel (class of 1963) was a sports commentator and television news personality.
- Jamarco Jones (class of 2014) Ohio State left tackle and Seattle Seahawk's 2018 draft selection.
- Bob Kennedy (class of 1938) was a Major League Baseball player (1939–42, 46–57) and manager. He played for the 1948 World Series champion Cleveland Indians, was a member of the Chicago Cubs' College of Coaches (serving as "head coach" from 1963 to 1965); first manager for relocated Oakland Athletics, and general manager for Chicago Cubs (1977–81).
- Jack Kerris was a professional basketball player, in the NBA (1950–53). He was a first round draft pick in the 1949 Basketball Association of America draft.
- Ed "Moose" Krause (class of 1930) played basketball at Notre Dame, becoming the second three-time All–American in NCAA basketball history (the first being John Wooden). He returned to Notre Dame as coach and athletic director, and was elected to the Basketball Hall of Fame in 1976.
- LaRue Martin was a basketball player for Loyola University and the Portland Trail Blazers (1972–76). He was the first overall pick in the 1972 NBA draft.
- Derek Needham (Class of 2009) is a basketball player for Pallacanestro Reggiana in the Lega Basket Serie A and a member of the Montenegro national basketball team.
- Noname Gypsy (Class of 2010) is an American rapper and poet.
- Emmett T. "Red" Ormsby (class of 1912) was an American League umpire (1923–41). He umpired in the 1927, 1933, 1937, and 1940 World Series, as well as the 1935 Major League Baseball All-Star Game.
- Dennis O'Toole, MLB player for White Sox.
- Lou Pote (class of 1989) had a short career as a Major League Baseball pitcher (1999–2002, 04), mostly with the Anaheim Angels.
- Eddie Riska, National Basketball League player for the Oshkosh All-Stars and All-American at Notre Dame.
- Renaldo Wynn (class of 1992) played for Notre Dame, and had a long career as an NFL defensive lineman (1997–2009) mostly for the Jacksonville Jaguars and Washington Redskins.

== Notable staff members ==
- Chet Bulger was a teacher, coach and U.S. Navy Veteran (1949–82), and a volunteer in the school's development office (1989–93). From 1942 to 1949, he was an offensive tackle for the Chicago Cardinals, and was a part of their 1947 NFL Championship team. The main athletic field at De La Salle was renamed in his honor in 2007.
