= Jirka =

Jirka (feminine: Jirková) is a Czech surname. It is a pet form of the given name Jiří. Notable people with the surname include:

- David Jirka (born 1982), Czech rower
- Erik Jirka (born 1997), Slovak footballer
- Frank J. Jirka Jr. (1922–2000), American physician
- Jan Jirka (born 1993), Czech sprinter

== See also ==
- A character in The Devil and Kate by Antonín Dvořák
