= British Columbia Real Estate Association =

The British Columbia Real Estate Association (BCREA) is a Canadian provincial member-based organization which represents 11 member real estate boards and their approximately 23,000 real estate agents on provincial issues. Their office is located in Vancouver.

BCREA members are licensed by the Real Estate Council of British Columbia under the Real Estate Services Act. Effective January 1, 2007, licensees are required to complete continuing education for licence renewal. The continuing education courses are called the Applied Practice and Legal Update course.

== History ==
BCREA was established on March 31, 1976, as the voice of the province's real estate boards after the dissolution of the Realtor Division of the Real Estate Institute of BC. The organization was responsible for the administration of post-licensing real estate education as well as a government liaison. BCREA evolved its services to include administering applied practice courses beginning in 1988, producing Continuing professional education courses and developing the Professional Development Program (PDP) in 2006.

BCREA produced printed newsletters beginning in 1978, hosted the first Political Action Seminar in Victoria in 1988 (which became an annual event in 1998) and developed an online presence in 1995. BCREA adapted the Quality of Life program principles in 2004 to guide policy development and advocacy activities and in 2006 an Economics Department was created to provide statistical and informational services to its members. Over the past 34 years, BCREA has worked on the development of standard forms used in real estate transactions.

== See also ==
- Canadian Real Estate Association
- Association of Real Estate Taxpayers
