= James E. Bistor =

James Eugene Bistor (July 20, 1890 – March 3, 1945) was a tax resistance leader, and real estate operator and broker. Along with John M. Pratt, he led the probably the largest tax strike since the Era of the American Revolution.

== Early years ==
Bistor was born in Macomb, Illinois. His parents died during his childhood and he supported the surviving family members, six brothers, by lighting streetlights in Macomb. He moved to Chicago as a teenager and worked as bicycling collector for a local real estate firm. In 1917, he was a founder of the firm Hedberg and Bistor. The two enjoyed a booming business in the 1920s and acquired some prime property, including a fifteen-story skyscraper in the Loop and a massive apartment complex on Lake Shore Drive. They went heavily into debt to finance this expansion and found it difficult to adapt when real estate values dipped in the late 1920s.

== Career and strikes ==
In 1930, Bistor became the president of the Association of Real Estate Taxpayers (ARET), an organization of real-estate taxpayers in Chicago and Cook County. Between 1931 and 1933, it organized one of the largest tax strikes in American history. The chief demand of ARET was that local and state governments obey a long-ignored provision of the Illinois Constitution of 1870 requiring uniform taxation for all forms of property, Pratt charged that the failure to assess such personal property as furniture, cars, and stocks and bonds was not only illegal but left owners of real estate with excessive burdens. ARET's program also included support for sweeping rate reductions in the general property tax and retrenchment in local governmental spending.

ARET functioned primarily as a cooperative legal service. Each member paid annual dues of $15 to fund lawsuits challenging the constitutionality of real-estate assessments. The radical side of the movement became apparent by early 1931 when ARET called for taxpayers to withhold real-estate taxes (or "strike") pending a final ruling by the Illinois Supreme Court, and later the U.S. Supreme Court. Mayor Anton Cermak and other politicians desperately tried to break the strike by threatening criminal prosecution of Bistor and other ARET leaders and revocation of city services.

ARET's influence peaked in late 1932, with a membership approaching 30,000 (largely skilled workers and small-business owners.) By this time, it had a budget of over $600,000 and a radio show in Chicago.

== Strike collapse ==
But it suffered a demoralizing blow in October 1932 when the U.S. Supreme Court refused to hear a case it had brought. Buffeted by political coercion and legal defeats, and torn by internal factionalism, the strike collapsed in early 1933.

In the years after the collapse of ARET, Bistor continued to be heavily involved in Chicago real estate, and became the trustee of Honest Money Founders.

== Death ==
He died in Chicago on March 3, 1945.
