= 1936 United States presidential election in Illinois =

- November 3, 1936

All 29 Illinois votes to the Electoral College

Nominee	Franklin D. Roosevelt	Alf Landon
Party	Democratic	Republican
Home state	New York	Kansas
Running mate	John Nance Garner	Frank Knox
Electoral vote	29	0
Popular vote	2,282,999	1,570,393
Percentage	57.70%	39.69%
County results
Roosevelt
40–50%
50–60%
60–70%
Landon
40–50%
50–60%
60–70%
President before election
Franklin D. Roosevelt
Democratic
Elected President
Franklin D. Roosevelt
Democratic

The 1936 United States presidential election in Illinois took place on November 3, 1936, as part of the 1936 United States presidential election. State voters chose 29 representatives, or electors, to the Electoral College, who voted for president and vice president.

Illinois was won by incumbent President Franklin D. Roosevelt (D–New York), running with Vice President John Nance Garner, with 57.70% of the popular vote, against Governor Alf Landon (R–Kansas), running with Frank Knox, with 39.69% of the popular vote. In this election, Cook County became the first county in American history to give over a million votes to a presidential candidate. As of the 2024 presidential election, this is the last occasion when Iroquois County and Woodford County voted for a Democratic presidential candidate.

== Primaries ==
The primaries and general elections coincided with those for other federal offices (Senate and House), as well as those for state offices.

=== Turnout ===
The total vote in the state-run primary elections (Democratic and Republican) was 2,331,597.

The total vote in the general election was 3,956,522. Both major parties held non-binding state-run preferential primaries on April 14.

=== Democratic ===
1936 Illinois Democratic presidential primary
- April 14, 1936
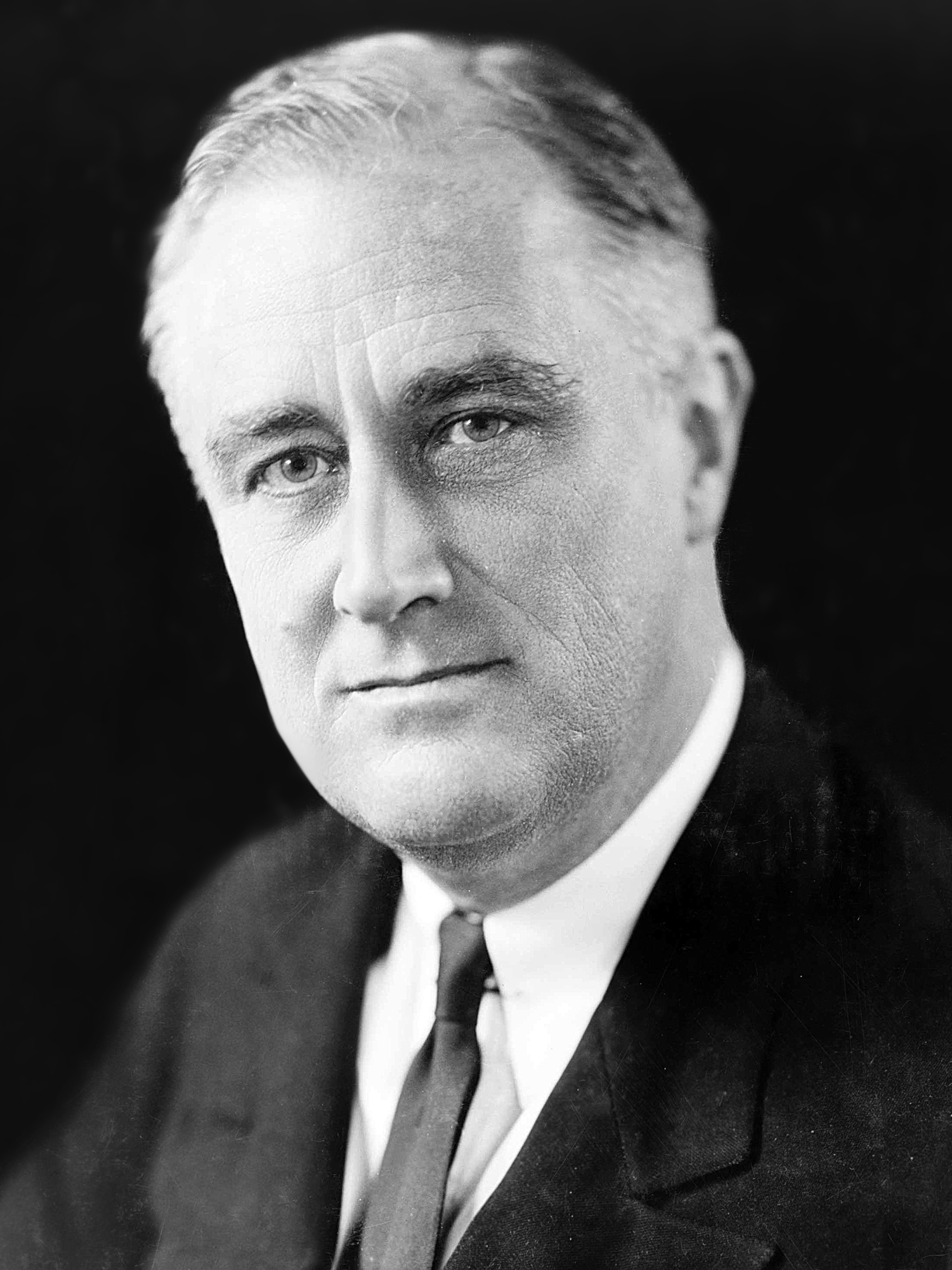
Candidate	Franklin D. Roosevelt
Home state	New York
Popular vote	1,416,411
Percentage	99.97%

The 1936 Illinois Democratic presidential primary was held on April 14, 1936, in the U.S. state of Illinois as one of the Democratic Party's state primaries ahead of the 1936 presidential election.

The popular vote was a non-binding "beauty contest". Delegates were instead elected by direct votes by congressional district on delegate candidates.

1936 Illinois Democratic presidential primary
Candidate	Votes	%
Franklin D. Roosevelt	1,416,411	99.97
Scattering	411	0.03
Total	1,416,822	100

=== Republican ===
1936 Illinois Republican presidential primary
- April 14, 1936
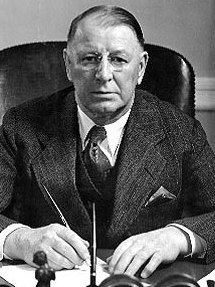

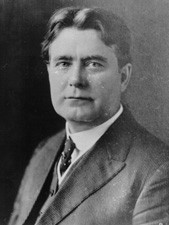
Candidate	Frank Knox	William Borah
Home state	Illinois	Idaho
Popular vote	491,575	419,220
Percentage	53.74%	45.83%

The 1936 Illinois Republican presidential primary was held on April 14, 1936, in the U.S. state of Illinois as one of the Republican Party's state primaries ahead of the 1936 presidential election.

The preference vote was a "beauty contest". Delegates were instead selected by direct-vote in each congressional districts on delegate candidates.

1936 Illinois Republican presidential primary
Candidate	Votes	%
Frank Knox	491,575	53.74
William E. Borah	419,220	45.83
Alf M. Landon (write-in)	3,775	0.41
Scattering	205	0.02
Total	914,775	100

== Results ==
1936 United States presidential election in Illinois
Party	Candidate	Votes	%
Democratic	Franklin D. Roosevelt (inc.)	2,282,999	57.70%
Republican	Alf Landon	1,570,393	39.69%
Union	William Lemke	89,439	2.26%
Socialist	Norman Thomas	7,530	0.19%
Prohibition	D. Leigh Colvin	3,439	0.09%
Socialist Labor	John W. Aiken	1,921	0.05%
n/a	Write-ins	801	0.02%
Total votes		3,956,522	100%

=== Results by county ===
County	Franklin Delano Roosevelt Democratic		Alfred Mossman Landon Republican		William Frederick Lemke Union		Norman Mattoon Thomas Socialist		David Leigh Colvin Prohibition		John W. Aiken Socialist Labor		Margin		Total votes cast
County	#	%	#	%	#	%	#	%	#	%	#	%	#	%	Total votes cast
Adams	18,857	56.33%	13,114	39.18%	1,406	4.20%	42	0.13%	38	0.11%	16	0.05%	5,743	17.16%	33,473
Alexander	6,972	55.10%	5,553	43.89%	62	0.49%	18	0.14%	26	0.21%	22	0.17%	1,419	11.21%	12,653
Bond	3,541	45.19%	4,046	51.63%	136	1.74%	23	0.29%	89	1.14%	1	0.01%	-505	-6.44%	7,836
Boone	2,383	29.71%	5,375	67.00%	241	3.00%	10	0.12%	7	0.09%	6	0.07%	-2,992	-37.30%	8,022
Brown	2,873	63.16%	1,591	34.97%	72	1.58%	13	0.29%	0	0.00%	0	0.00%	1,282	28.18%	4,549
Bureau	9,516	46.83%	10,462	51.48%	280	1.38%	19	0.09%	28	0.14%	17	0.08%	-946	-4.66%	20,322
Calhoun	2,058	50.17%	1,883	45.90%	153	3.73%	1	0.02%	3	0.07%	4	0.10%	175	4.27%	4,102
Carroll	4,368	46.83%	4,886	52.38%	50	0.54%	11	0.12%	12	0.13%	1	0.01%	-518	-5.55%	9,328
Cass	5,786	63.65%	3,209	35.30%	78	0.86%	8	0.09%	9	0.10%	0	0.00%	2,577	28.35%	9,090
Champaign	18,203	52.71%	15,808	45.77%	400	1.16%	77	0.22%	37	0.11%	10	0.03%	2,395	6.93%	34,535
Christian	11,400	55.55%	8,145	39.69%	870	4.24%	61	0.30%	32	0.16%	13	0.06%	3,255	15.86%	20,521
Clark	5,836	51.58%	5,426	47.96%	20	0.18%	4	0.04%	28	0.25%	0	0.00%	410	3.62%	11,314
Clay	4,752	50.64%	4,528	48.25%	65	0.69%	9	0.10%	28	0.30%	2	0.02%	224	2.39%	9,384
Clinton	5,355	48.05%	3,653	32.78%	2,082	18.68%	31	0.28%	17	0.15%	7	0.06%	1,702	15.27%	11,145
Coles	11,931	57.17%	8,800	42.17%	97	0.46%	13	0.06%	21	0.10%	6	0.03%	3,131	15.00%	20,868
Cook	1,253,164	62.36%	701,206	34.90%	48,995	2.44%	3,835	0.19%	630	0.03%	839	0.04%	551,958	27.47%	2,009,457 (Note: 788 write-in votes were recorded from this county.)
Crawford	6,164	50.95%	5,823	48.13%	67	0.55%	7	0.06%	35	0.29%	3	0.02%	341	2.82%	12,099
Cumberland	3,290	51.76%	3,016	47.45%	39	0.61%	2	0.03%	6	0.09%	3	0.05%	274	4.31%	6,356
DeKalb	7,899	43.22%	9,826	53.77%	490	2.68%	20	0.11%	33	0.18%	7	0.04%	-1,927	-10.54%	18,275
DeWitt	5,676	55.21%	4,544	44.20%	36	0.35%	7	0.07%	16	0.16%	1	0.01%	1,132	11.01%	10,280
Douglas	5,029	51.88%	4,606	47.51%	40	0.41%	2	0.02%	14	0.14%	3	0.03%	423	4.36%	9,694
DuPage	21,684	42.00%	28,380	54.97%	1,330	2.58%	177	0.34%	46	0.09%	15	0.03%	-6,696	-12.97%	51,632
Edgar	7,822	52.50%	6,929	46.51%	115	0.77%	6	0.04%	25	0.17%	1	0.01%	893	5.99%	14,898
Edwards	2,211	43.35%	2,813	55.16%	43	0.84%	3	0.06%	30	0.59%	0	0.00%	-602	-11.80%	5,100
Effingham	6,030	56.98%	4,293	40.57%	224	2.12%	7	0.07%	25	0.24%	4	0.04%	1,737	16.41%	10,583
Fayette	6,824	51.04%	6,419	48.01%	69	0.52%	11	0.08%	44	0.33%	4	0.03%	405	3.03%	13,371
Ford	3,715	44.17%	4,524	53.79%	159	1.89%	4	0.05%	6	0.07%	2	0.02%	-809	-9.62%	8,410
Franklin	15,254	57.29%	10,708	40.22%	483	1.81%	97	0.36%	33	0.12%	50	0.19%	4,546	17.07%	26,625
Fulton	12,864	54.92%	10,130	43.25%	239	1.02%	61	0.26%	64	0.27%	64	0.27%	2,734	11.67%	23,422
Gallatin	3,701	64.10%	2,004	34.71%	31	0.54%	11	0.19%	20	0.35%	7	0.12%	1,697	29.39%	5,774
Greene	6,510	61.74%	3,916	37.14%	95	0.90%	4	0.04%	10	0.09%	9	0.09%	2,594	24.60%	10,544
Grundy	4,481	44.00%	5,360	52.63%	330	3.24%	7	0.07%	5	0.05%	2	0.02%	-879	-8.63%	10,185
Hamilton	4,152	55.10%	3,321	44.07%	40	0.53%	6	0.08%	10	0.13%	6	0.08%	831	11.03%	7,535
Hancock	7,726	49.82%	7,383	47.61%	337	2.17%	11	0.07%	43	0.28%	7	0.05%	343	2.21%	15,507
Hardin	1,984	49.46%	2,008	50.06%	5	0.12%	4	0.10%	8	0.20%	2	0.05%	-24	-0.60%	4,011
Henderson	2,496	47.82%	2,663	51.02%	47	0.90%	3	0.06%	9	0.17%	2	0.04%	-167	-3.20%	5,220
Henry	11,490	47.69%	11,953	49.61%	497	2.06%	116	0.48%	26	0.11%	12	0.05%	-463	-1.92%	24,094
Iroquois	8,654	50.39%	7,908	46.05%	570	3.32%	16	0.09%	20	0.12%	5	0.03%	746	4.34%	17,173
Jackson	9,971	48.53%	10,363	50.44%	124	0.60%	36	0.18%	45	0.22%	7	0.03%	-392	-1.91%	20,546
Jasper	4,149	55.31%	3,221	42.94%	114	1.52%	2	0.03%	15	0.20%	1	0.01%	928	12.37%	7,502
Jefferson	10,240	57.96%	7,290	41.26%	65	0.37%	15	0.08%	54	0.31%	4	0.02%	2,950	16.70%	17,668
Jersey	3,955	56.01%	3,023	42.81%	57	0.81%	14	0.20%	7	0.10%	5	0.07%	932	13.20%	7,061
Jo Daviess	5,079	46.38%	5,619	51.32%	229	2.09%	9	0.08%	13	0.12%	1	0.01%	-540	-4.93%	10,950
Johnson	2,497	41.27%	3,537	58.46%	5	0.08%	4	0.07%	6	0.10%	1	0.02%	-1,040	-17.19%	6,050
Kane	28,187	44.23%	33,491	52.55%	1,884	2.96%	114	0.18%	34	0.05%	19	0.03%	-5,304	-8.32%	63,729
Kankakee	13,162	49.60%	10,935	41.21%	2,377	8.96%	12	0.05%	23	0.09%	29	0.11%	2,227	8.39%	26,538
Kendall	2,374	41.50%	3,138	54.86%	205	3.58%	1	0.02%	2	0.03%	0	0.00%	-764	-13.36%	5,720
Knox	13,697	47.03%	14,712	50.52%	644	2.21%	38	0.13%	26	0.09%	7	0.02%	-1,015	-3.49%	29,124
Lake	24,524	45.69%	27,548	51.32%	1,380	2.57%	167	0.31%	19	0.04%	34	0.06%	-3,024	-5.63%	53,675 (Note: Three write-in votes were recorded from this county.)
LaSalle	26,926	52.59%	22,240	43.44%	1,846	3.61%	141	0.28%	25	0.05%	23	0.04%	4,686	9.15%	51,201
Lawrence	6,168	54.11%	5,060	44.39%	87	0.76%	4	0.04%	76	0.67%	3	0.03%	1,108	9.72%	11,398
Lee	6,845	42.16%	8,914	54.91%	456	2.81%	9	0.06%	5	0.03%	6	0.04%	-2,069	-12.74%	16,235
Livingston	9,190	45.20%	10,801	53.12%	309	1.52%	12	0.06%	20	0.10%	2	0.01%	-1,611	-7.92%	20,334
Logan	7,886	52.27%	7,019	46.52%	149	0.99%	18	0.12%	10	0.07%	5	0.03%	867	5.75%	15,087
Macon	27,360	62.92%	15,585	35.84%	366	0.84%	77	0.18%	77	0.18%	20	0.05%	11,775	27.08%	43,486 (Note: One write-in vote was recorded from this county.)
Macoupin	14,896	57.62%	9,502	36.76%	950	3.67%	406	1.57%	61	0.24%	36	0.14%	5,394	20.87%	25,851
Madison	42,172	64.20%	22,073	33.60%	1,085	1.65%	242	0.37%	51	0.08%	63	0.10%	20,099	30.60%	65,686
Marion	10,820	55.64%	8,321	42.79%	186	0.96%	36	0.19%	67	0.34%	16	0.08%	2,499	12.85%	19,446
Marshall	4,149	53.47%	3,544	45.67%	63	0.81%	3	0.04%	1	0.01%	0	0.00%	605	7.80%	7,760
Mason	5,278	60.45%	3,395	38.88%	44	0.50%	1	0.01%	13	0.15%	0	0.00%	1,883	21.57%	8,731
Massac	3,039	43.52%	3,894	55.76%	30	0.43%	10	0.14%	7	0.10%	3	0.04%	-855	-12.24%	6,983
McDonough	7,138	44.58%	8,723	54.48%	106	0.66%	12	0.07%	29	0.18%	4	0.02%	-1,585	-9.90%	16,012
McHenry	6,893	34.70%	12,031	60.56%	898	4.52%	19	0.10%	6	0.03%	19	0.10%	-5,138	-25.86%	19,866
McLean	21,508	54.96%	16,826	43.00%	663	1.69%	58	0.15%	65	0.17%	12	0.03%	4,682	11.96%	39,132
Menard	3,152	50.22%	3,067	48.86%	38	0.61%	6	0.10%	11	0.18%	3	0.05%	85	1.35%	6,277
Mercer	4,751	48.07%	5,028	50.87%	84	0.85%	4	0.04%	16	0.16%	1	0.01%	-277	-2.80%	9,884
Monroe	3,477	50.76%	3,226	47.09%	140	2.04%	4	0.06%	1	0.01%	2	0.03%	251	3.66%	6,850
Montgomery	10,132	53.43%	8,140	42.92%	536	2.83%	72	0.38%	63	0.33%	12	0.06%	1,992	10.50%	18,964 (Note: 9 write-in votes were recorded from this county.)
Morgan	9,800	52.10%	8,844	47.02%	111	0.59%	32	0.17%	19	0.10%	5	0.03%	956	5.08%	18,811
Moultrie	4,110	56.70%	3,074	42.41%	40	0.55%	4	0.06%	20	0.28%	1	0.01%	1,036	14.29%	7,249
Ogle	5,776	37.15%	9,576	61.60%	158	1.02%	9	0.06%	21	0.14%	6	0.04%	-3,800	-24.44%	15,546
Peoria	48,063	64.20%	25,425	33.96%	1,223	1.63%	75	0.10%	34	0.05%	45	0.06%	22,638	30.24%	74,865
Perry	7,043	55.16%	5,482	42.94%	172	1.35%	40	0.31%	27	0.21%	4	0.03%	1,561	12.23%	12,768
Piatt	4,084	50.66%	3,931	48.77%	29	0.36%	6	0.07%	11	0.14%	0	0.00%	153	1.90%	8,061
Pike	8,187	58.59%	5,589	40.00%	140	1.00%	28	0.20%	23	0.16%	7	0.05%	2,598	18.59%	13,974
Pope	1,728	37.99%	2,787	61.28%	22	0.48%	5	0.11%	4	0.09%	2	0.04%	-1,059	-23.28%	4,548
Pulaski	3,804	49.76%	3,774	49.37%	38	0.50%	17	0.22%	12	0.16%	0	0.00%	30	0.39%	7,645
Putnam	1,437	49.53%	1,435	49.47%	24	0.83%	3	0.10%	2	0.07%	0	0.00%	2	0.07%	2,901
Randolph	8,247	52.53%	7,057	44.95%	355	2.26%	23	0.15%	17	0.11%	2	0.01%	1,190	7.58%	15,701
Richland	4,268	50.26%	4,040	47.58%	136	1.60%	3	0.04%	42	0.49%	2	0.02%	228	2.69%	8,491
Rock Island	32,741	61.74%	19,487	36.75%	680	1.28%	70	0.13%	32	0.06%	17	0.03%	13,254	24.99%	53,027
Saline	10,253	52.27%	9,055	46.16%	204	1.04%	42	0.21%	38	0.19%	24	0.12%	1,198	6.11%	19,616
Sangamon	32,281	50.70%	29,562	46.43%	1,630	2.56%	106	0.17%	56	0.09%	35	0.05%	2,719	4.27%	63,670
Schuyler	3,885	55.84%	3,029	43.54%	20	0.29%	1	0.01%	21	0.30%	1	0.01%	856	12.30%	6,957
Scott	2,945	57.32%	2,165	42.14%	23	0.45%	1	0.02%	3	0.06%	1	0.02%	780	15.18%	5,138
Shelby	8,186	57.64%	5,795	40.81%	135	0.95%	8	0.06%	74	0.52%	3	0.02%	2,391	16.84%	14,201
St. Clair	54,238	64.75%	26,684	31.86%	2,388	2.85%	251	0.30%	71	0.08%	130	0.16%	27,554	32.90%	83,762
Stark	2,220	44.78%	2,696	54.38%	41	0.83%	1	0.02%	0	0.00%	0	0.00%	-476	-9.60%	4,958
Stephenson	10,567	49.51%	9,943	46.59%	729	3.42%	43	0.20%	53	0.25%	7	0.03%	624	2.92%	21,342
Tazewell	16,487	66.55%	7,946	32.07%	297	1.20%	20	0.08%	20	0.08%	4	0.02%	8,541	34.48%	24,774
Union	6,260	59.84%	4,165	39.81%	15	0.14%	10	0.10%	7	0.07%	4	0.04%	2,095	20.03%	10,461
Vermilion	25,016	56.65%	18,350	41.56%	616	1.40%	53	0.12%	104	0.24%	17	0.04%	6,666	15.10%	44,156
Wabash	4,214	58.33%	2,860	39.59%	61	0.84%	4	0.06%	82	1.14%	3	0.04%	1,354	18.74%	7,224
Warren	5,409	43.39%	6,919	55.51%	98	0.79%	12	0.10%	22	0.18%	5	0.04%	-1,510	-12.11%	12,465
Washington	4,119	46.45%	4,540	51.20%	181	2.04%	13	0.15%	15	0.17%	0	0.00%	-421	-4.75%	8,868
Wayne	5,752	50.77%	5,528	48.79%	25	0.22%	4	0.04%	19	0.17%	2	0.02%	224	1.98%	11,330
White	6,511	59.68%	4,322	39.62%	48	0.44%	5	0.05%	17	0.16%	6	0.06%	2,189	20.07%	10,909
Whiteside	7,982	37.57%	12,666	59.62%	558	2.63%	12	0.06%	20	0.09%	5	0.02%	-4,684	-22.05%	21,243
Will	28,135	50.86%	25,028	45.25%	2,041	3.69%	71	0.13%	19	0.03%	20	0.04%	3,107	5.62%	55,314
Williamson	14,663	53.64%	12,319	45.07%	230	0.84%	52	0.19%	57	0.21%	13	0.05%	2,344	8.58%	27,334
Winnebago	27,200	50.38%	24,997	46.30%	1,468	2.72%	212	0.39%	57	0.11%	55	0.10%	2,203	4.08%	53,989
Woodford	5,122	50.75%	4,845	48.00%	93	0.92%	5	0.05%	25	0.25%	3	0.03%	277	2.74%	10,093
Totals	2,282,999	57.70%	1,570,393	39.69%	89,439	2.26%	7,530	0.19%	3,439	0.09%	1,921	0.05%	712,606	18.01%	3,956,522

==== Counties that flipped from Democratic to Republican ====
- Bond
- Bureau
- Ford
- Grundy
- Hardin
- Henderson
- Jackson
- Jo Daviess
- Knox
- Livingston
- McDonough
- Stark
- Warren
- Washington

==== Counties that flipped from Republican to Democratic ====
- Winnebago

== See also ==
- United States presidential elections in Illinois
