= 1936 United States Senate election in Illinois =

- November 3, 1936
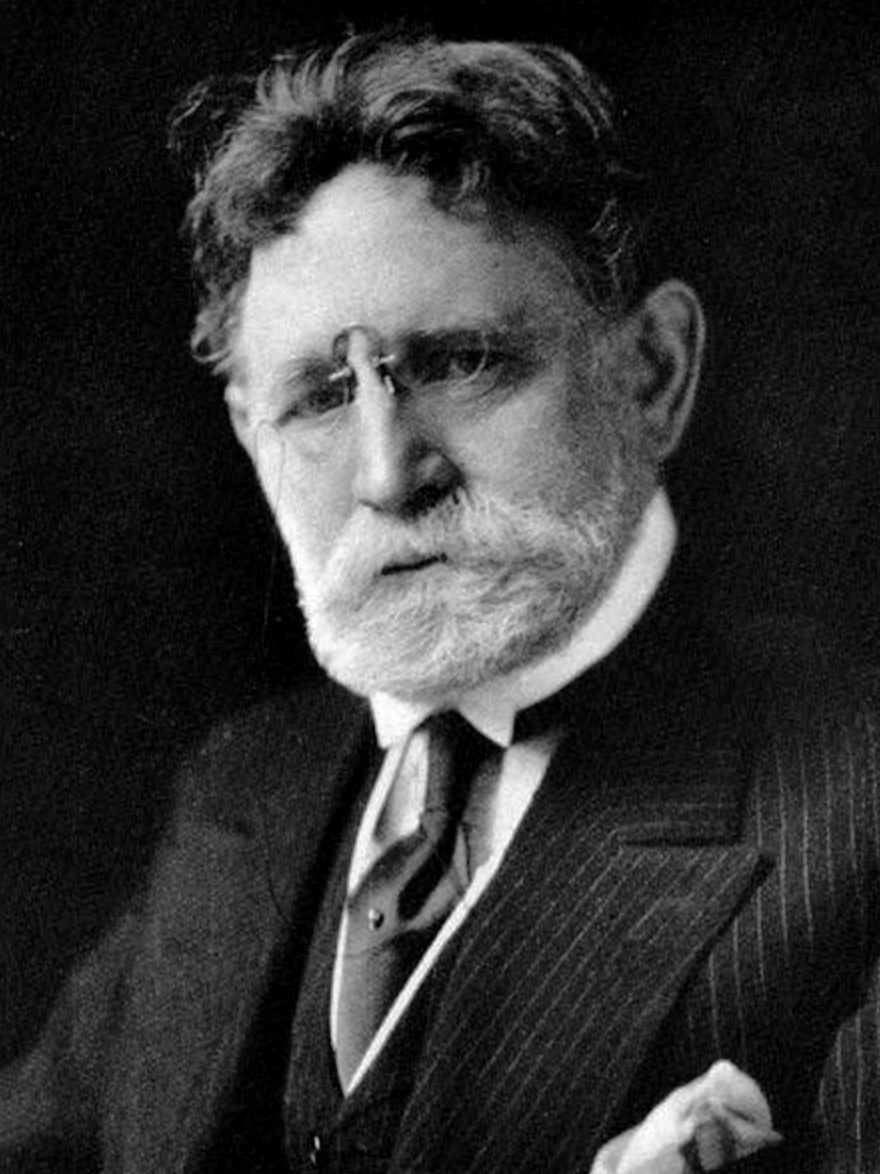

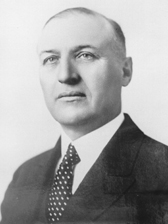
Nominee	J. Hamilton Lewis	Otis F. Glenn
Party	Democratic	Republican
Popular vote	2,142,887	1,545,170
Percentage	56.47%	40.72%
- County results Lewis: 40–50% 50–60% 60–70% Glenn: 40–50% 50–60% 60–70%
U.S. senator before election
J. Hamilton Lewis
Democratic
Elected U.S. senator
J. Hamilton Lewis
Democratic

The 1936 United States Senate election in Illinois took place on November 3, 1936. Incumbent Democrat J. Hamilton Lewis was elected to a second consecutive, and third overall, term as United States senator.

The primaries and general election coincided with those for other federal (president and House) and those for state elections. The primaries were held April 14, 1936.

== Democratic primary ==
=== Candidates ===
- C. H. Kavanagh
- J. Hamilton Lewis, incumbent U.S. Senator
- Ruth R. McNamara

=== Results ===
Democratic primary
Party	Candidate	Votes	%
Democratic	James Hamilton Lewis (incumbent)	1,144,096	88.48
Democratic	C. H. Kavanagh	92,524	7.16
Democratic	Ruth R. McNamara	56,449	4.37
Total votes		1,293,069	100

== Republican primary ==
=== Candidates ===
- William J. Baker
- Otis F. Glenn, former U.S. Senator
- William E. Hull, former U.S. congressman
- Willie A. Overholser
- Orville J. Taylor

=== Results ===
Republican primary
Party	Candidate	Votes	%
Republican	Otis F. Glenn	510,811	56.72
Republican	William E. Hull	231,863	25.75
Republican	Orville J. Taylor	78,511	8.72
Republican	William J. Baker	40,714	4.52
Republican	Willie A. Overholser	386,411	4.29
Total votes		9,005,401	100

== General election ==
1936 United States Senate election in Illinois
Party	Candidate	Votes	%
Democratic	J. Hamilton Lewis (incumbent)	2,142,887	56.47%
Republican	Otis F. Glenn	1,545,170	40.72%
Union Progressive	Newton Jenkins	93,696	2.47%
Socialist	Arthur McDowell	7,405	0.20%
Prohibition	Adah M. Hagler	3,298	0.09%
Socialist Labor	Frank Schnur	2,208	0.06%
Majority		597,717	15.75%
Turnout		3,794,664	
Democratic hold			

== See also ==
- 1936 United States Senate elections
