= Peter Reinberg =

American politician

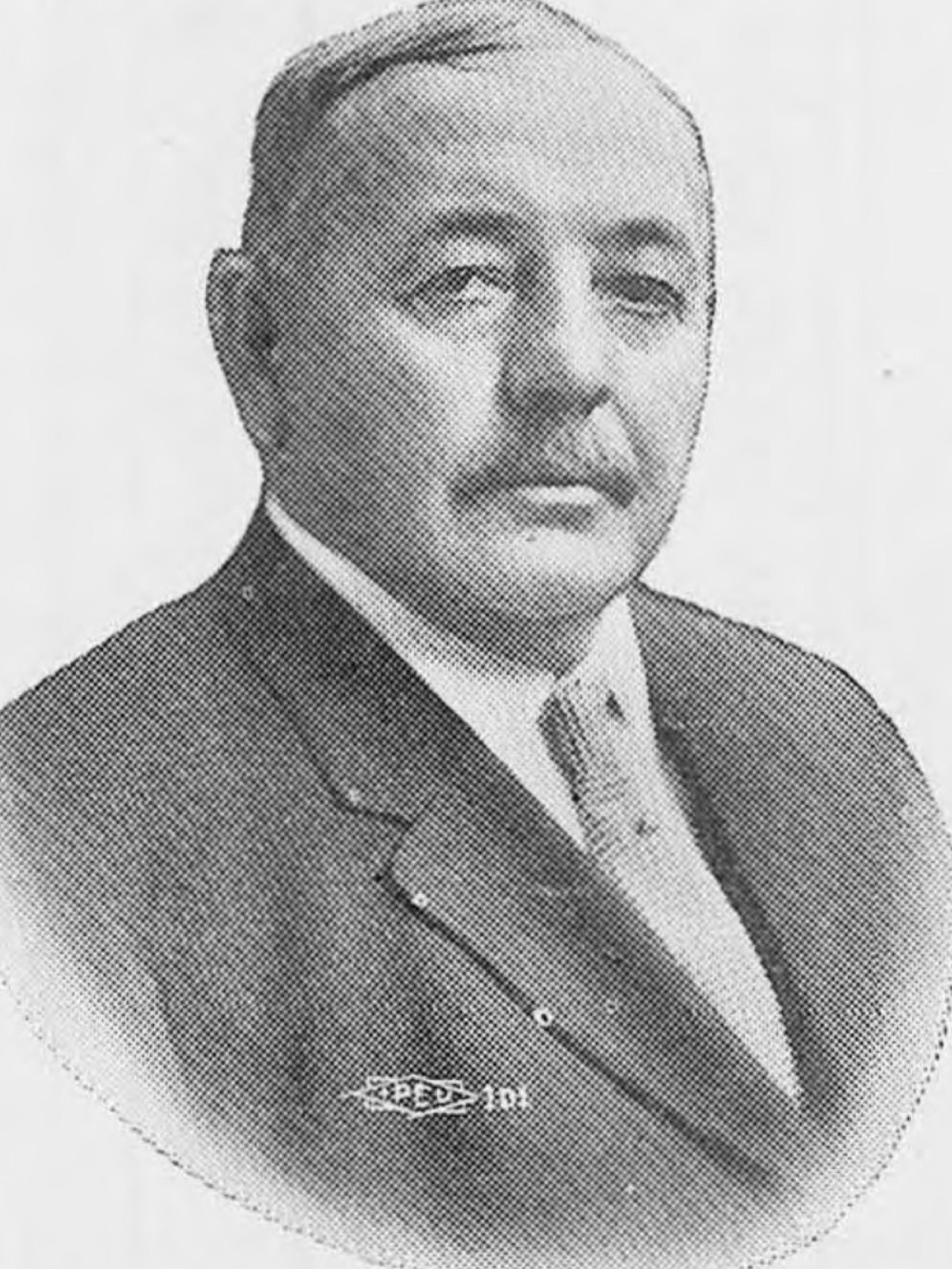

President of the Cook County Board of Commissioners
- In office 1914–1921
- Preceded by: Alexander A. McCormick
- Succeeded by: Daniel Ryan Sr.

President of the Chicago Board of Education
- In office 1912–1914
- Preceded by: J. B. McFatrich
- Succeeded by: Michael J. Collins

Chicago Alderman from the 26th ward
- In office 1904–1912 Serving with Freeman K. Blake (1904-1905); William F. Lipps (1905-1912)
- Preceded by: William C. Kuester
- Succeeded by: George Pretzel

Personal details
- Born: March 5, 1858 Chicago, Illinois
- Died: February 21, 1921 (age 68) Chicago, Illinois
- Party: Democratic
- Occupation: Florist

Peter A. Reinberg (March 5, 1858 – February 21, 1921) was an American businessman and politician who was a very successful florist, and who served in the offices of president of the Cook County Board of Commissioners, president of the Chicago Board of Education, and Chicago alderman.

== Early life ==
Reinberg was born on March 5, 1858, in Chicago, Illinois, where he was also raised. He born to Henry and Katherine Reinberg, immigrants who hailed from, Préizerdaul, Luxembourg. The family lived in the Edgewater neighborhood of Chicago, living near Rosehill Cemetery.

Reinberg was educated in Chicago Public Schools.

== Private sector career ==
Reinberg had a very successful career as a florist. He had begun by growing turnips and potatoes, before experimenting with roses and flowers in 1890. He was very successful at growing roses and carnations, and eventually owned greenhouses with 1,200,000 square feet (110,000 square meters) of glass. He was among the most famous greenhouse owners in Chicago. He was considered the "Rose King" of Chicago. His business made him a millionaire, and he was among the largest rose growers in the world. He was also considered to be the largest grower of carnations in the United States.

Reinberg would serve on the board of directors of Ravenswood Bank.

== Chicago City Council ==
In 1904, Reinberg made his political debut by successfully running as the Democratic nominee for Chicago City Council in the 26th district. In his campaign, he used the unique gimmick of providing each resident of his ward with carnations to wear.

Reinberg was reelected in 1906, 1908, and 1910. Reinberg was unseated in 1912 by Republican nominee George Pretzel.

In years such as 1908 and 1910, he had received election endorsements from the Municipal Voters League.

== President of the Chicago Board of Education ==
In the fall of 1912, Reinberg became president of the Chicago Board of Education. While Reinberg had originally indicated he would retire from the position, he made himself a candidate for another term in January 1914, as Mayor Carter Harrison IV had convinced him to stay aboard so that the board would continue to be led by an ally of superintendent Ella Flagg Young. Reelected, he served until resigning in December of that year, after becoming president of the Cook County Board of Commissioners.

== President of the Cook County Board of Commissioners ==
In 1914, he was elected president of the Cook County Board of Commissioners. Having been nominated by the Democratic Party, he defeated Progressive Parry incumbent Alexander A. McCormick. There was no Republican nominee (Republicans had been blocked by the Illinois Supreme Court from an electoral fusion joint nomination of McCormick). Reinberg led McCormick (the county's leading Progressive Party politician) by more than a 60,000 plurality in the November election. The Democratic Party swept the 1914 Cook County elections. However, unlike in Reinberg's race, for the other countywide offices, Democratic nominees had only won by mere hundreds of votes.

Reinberg was sworn in as president on December 7, 1914. He would hold the county board presidency until his death in office in 1921. He was reelected in November 1918, defeating Republican Charles N. Goodlow by a much narrower margin than his victory four years prior.

During Reinberg's tenure, the county was hit by the 1918 Spanish flu epidemic. Amid this, he ordered the Cook County Hospital closed to all visitors, except those visiting individuals dying from diseases other than the flu.

Reinberg was also, by virtue of this position as county board president, the first president of the newly created Forest Preserve District of Cook County. He oversaw its acquisition of more than 18,000 acres of land. He is sometimes considered the "father" of Cook County's forest preserve system.

== Death ==
Reinberg died on February 21, 1921, at his Chicago home of a cerebral hemorrhage.

== Legacy ==
After his death, the Forest Preserve District of Cook County would name a campground north of Palatine, Illinois "Camp Reinberg" after him.

Chicago Public Schools named its Peter A. Reinberrg Elementary School after Reinberg.
