= Frank J. Jirka Jr. =

American physician

Frank Joseph Jirka Jr., (July 27, 1922 – October 2, 2000) was an American physician. He was elected as the President of the American Medical Association in 1983, before which he served as the President of the Illinois State Medical Society, President of the Chicago Medical Society and of the Douglas Park Branch of the Chicago Medical Society.

== Military service ==
Born in Chicago as a grandson of Anton Cermak the Czech-born mayor of Chicago and nephew of Otto Kerner Jr.. In 1942, Jirka enlisted in the U.S. Navy and became part of the Underwater Demolition Teams (UDT), elite units tasked with reconnaissance and clearing obstacles ahead of amphibious landings. During his service as a lieutenant in the U.S. Navy during World War II. During a mission preceding the Battle of Iwo Jima in February 1945, Jirka sustained severe injuries from Japanese fire, resulting in the amputation of both legs below the knee. He was later awarded the Silver Star and Purple Heart.

== Career ==
He graduated from Knox College in 1944 where he was a member of the Delta chapter of the Tau Kappa Epsilon fraternity. Jirka earned his medical degree from the University of Illinois at Urbana–Champaign. He settled in Barrington Hills, Illinois for the last twenty years of his life.

== Death ==
He died in his home on October 2, 2000.
