= John M. Pratt =

American newspaper editor, publisher, and tax resistance leader (1886–1954)

- Born: John Morgan Bennett Pratt; March 23, 1886; Sharpsville, Tipton County, Indiana, U.S.
- Died: June 14, 1954; Chicago, Illinois, U.S.
- Education: Marion Normal College (now Indiana Wesleyan University)
- Occupations: Newspaper editor, publisher, civic leader
- Known for: Chairman of the Association of Real Estate Taxpayers; Founder of the North American Newspaper Alliance
- Spouses: Emma "Gertrude" Jones (m. 1909; div. before 1940); * Charlotte Hughes Pratt (née Royalty)
- Children: 3, including Davis Jackson Pratt and John T. Pratt

John M. Pratt (born John Morgan Bennett Pratt; March 23, 1886 – June 14, 1954) was an American newspaper editor, publisher, and civic activist. Over the course of his career, he served as editor of the Louisville Herald-Post, advertising manager for Hearst newspapers, and chairman of the Heritage Foundation, a Chicago publishing company. He was one of the founders of the North American Newspaper Alliance and later became known for his leadership in the Association of Real Estate Taxpayers, a major tax resistance movement in Chicago during the early 1930s.

== Early life and education ==
Pratt was born on March 23, 1886, in Sharpsville, Tipton County, Indiana, into a background of relative wealth. His father owned a tomato cannery and extensive farmland in the Sharpsville area. He attended Marion Normal College (also known as Marion College), where he studied to become a teacher.

During this period, the family lost much of its fortune when the cannery business failed. As a result, Pratt abandoned his plans for a teaching career and moved to northern Saskatchewan, Canada, where he homesteaded a large tract of land that eventually became one of the largest farms in the immediate area.

His full legal name, John Morgan Bennett Pratt, appears on his federal naturalization declaration filed in the U.S. District Court for the Northern District of Illinois between 1924 and 1925. On later records, including his World War II draft registration in 1942, he is listed simply as John M. Pratt.

== Career ==
In 1913, Pratt began a long political career when the counselors of Lost River, a rural municipality in Saskatchewan, elected him as their secretary treasurer. One of his duties was tax collection — an irony not lost on Pratt, who later joked about it during his tenure as a tax rebel in Chicago.

The life of a tax collector did not suit Pratt, and in 1917 he moved to Winnipeg to accept a position as municipal editor of The Grain Growers' Guide, a publication that represented the nascent cooperative movement in Canada. His editorials reflected an affinity for the theories of Henry George; like George, Pratt supported replacing the prevailing local tax on acreage with a system taxing the unimproved value of land.

In 1921, Pratt moved permanently to Chicago, where he joined the Universal Feature and Specialty Company, a national newspaper syndicate. He later became advertising manager for the Chicago Herald and Examiner, one of the city's two papers owned by William Randolph Hearst. In addition to his advertising and administrative duties, Pratt organized public relations for the Hearst-sponsored tour of Queen Marie of Romania.

In 1930, Pratt left Hearst's employ to become executive director of the Association of Real Estate Taxpayers (ARET), an organization representing Chicago and Cook County property owners. Between 1931 and 1933, the group organized one of the largest tax strikes in American history. ARET's primary demand was that local and state governments enforce a long-ignored provision of the Illinois Constitution of 1870 requiring uniform taxation across all forms of property. Pratt argued that the failure to assess personal property such as furniture, automobiles, and securities was not only illegal but placed an unfair burden on owners of real estate. The organization's program also called for major reductions in property tax rates and retrenchment in local government spending.

ARET functioned largely as a cooperative legal service, with members paying annual dues of $15 to fund lawsuits challenging real-estate assessments. The radical character of the movement became apparent in early 1931 when ARET urged members to withhold property tax payments (“strike”) pending final rulings by the Illinois and U.S. Supreme Courts. Mayor Anton Cermak and other Chicago officials sought to end the strike through threats of prosecution and service revocation. At its height in late 1932, ARET claimed nearly 30,000 members—mostly skilled workers and small-business owners—with a budget exceeding $600,000 and its own radio program. The movement suffered a setback in October 1932 when the U.S. Supreme Court declined to hear its case. Internal divisions and political pressure led to its collapse by early 1933.

In the two decades following ARET's dissolution, Pratt remained active in civic and political organizations associated with the Old Right. His participation reflected a persistent skepticism of government expansion and state paternalism. In 1940, he organized the National Physicians Committee for the Extension of Medical Service, a group funded by publisher Frank Gannett. The committee played a major role in opposing President Harry S. Truman’s proposal for government-subsidized national health insurance.

Later, Pratt established a publishing company known as the Heritage Foundation (unrelated to the modern Washington, D.C. think tank), which distributed works by conservative writers including Clarence Manion and radio commentator Paul Harvey. At the time of his death, he served as chairman of this organization, headquartered at 75 East Wacker Drive in Chicago.

== Personal life ==
Pratt married his first wife, Emma "Gertrude" Pratt (née Jones), on November 24, 1909, in Marion, Grant County, Indiana. The couple later divorced sometime before 1940. She was born in 1887 and died in 1953. They had two sons: John Thomas Pratt, the husband of dancer Katherine Dunham, and Davis Jackson Pratt (1917–1987).

By 1940, Pratt had married Charlotte Hughes Pratt (née Royalty), who appears with him in both the 1940 and 1950 U.S. Census records as his spouse. They had one daughter, Mary Hughes Pratt (born ca. September 1949).

Charlotte's obituary identifies her maiden name as Royalty and confirms her residence in Chicago during Pratt's later life.

== Death and legacy ==
Pratt died of a heart attack at his home in Chicago, Illinois, on June 14, 1954, at the age of 68. Funeral services were held in Chicago, and he was buried at Resthaven Cemetery in Louisville, Kentucky.

Pratt's work reflected the transformation of American journalism and civic activism in the early to mid-20th century. As a newspaperman, he contributed to national syndication and professionalization of reporting through the North American Newspaper Alliance. As a civic leader, his advocacy with the Association of Real Estate Taxpayers placed him at the intersection of Depression-era tax protest movements and the emerging libertarian "Old Right".
