= Anton Cermak =

American politician (1873–1933)

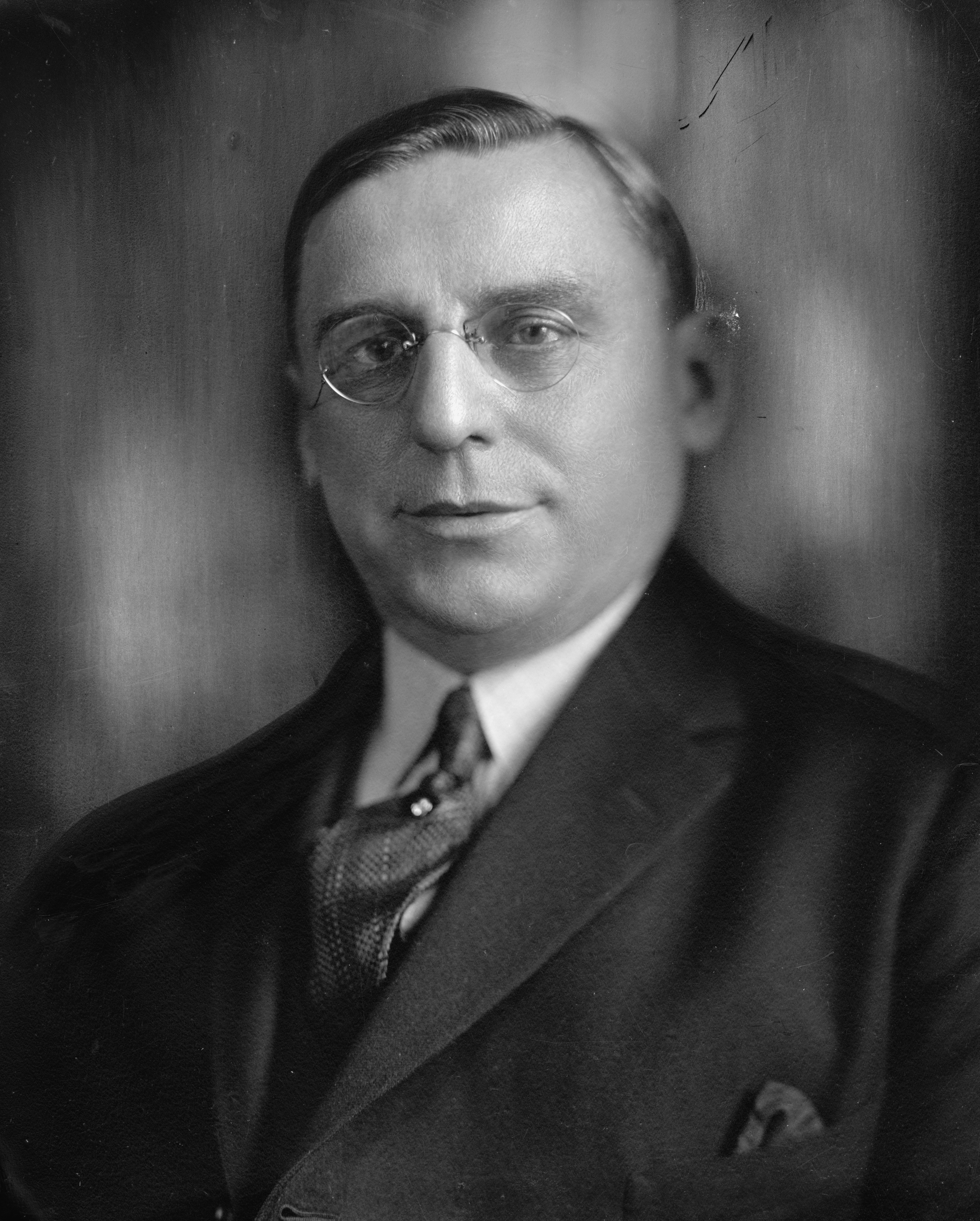
- Portrait by Harris & Ewing c. 1931–1933

44th Mayor of Chicago
- In office April 9, 1931 – March 6, 1933
- Preceded by: William Hale Thompson
- Succeeded by: Edward Joseph Kelly; Frank J. Corr (acting)

President of the Cook County Board of Commissioners
- In office December 4, 1922 – March 23, 1931
- Preceded by: Daniel Ryan Sr.
- Succeeded by: Emmett Whealan

Chair of the Cook County Democratic Party
- In office 1928–1931
- Preceded by: George E. Brennan
- Succeeded by: Patrick Nash

Member of the Chicago City Council from the 12th ward
- In office April 1919 – December 1922 Serving with Joseph I. Novak, Joseph Cepak
- Preceded by: Otto Kerner Sr.
- In office April 1909 – December 1912 Serving with Michael Zimmer, William F. Schulz
- Preceded by: Joseph Z. Uhlir
- Succeeded by: Joseph I. Novak

Member of the Illinois House of Representatives
- In office 1902–1909 Serving with Various (Multi-member district)
- Preceded by: David E. Shanahan, James J. O'Meara, John J. Morley
- Succeeded by: David E. Shanahan, Edward J. Murphy, Rudolph Stoklasa
- Constituency: 9th district

Personal details
- Born: Antonín Josef Čermák; May 9, 1873 Kladno, Bohemia, Austria-Hungary
- Died: March 6, 1933 (aged 59) Miami, Florida, U.S.
- Cause of death: Assassination by shooting
- Resting place: Bohemian National Cemetery
- Party: Democratic
- Spouse: Mary Horejs (m. 1894–1928)
- Children: 3
- Relatives: Otto Kerner Jr. (son-in-law); Richey V. Graham (son-in-law); Frank J. Jirka Jr. (grandson)

Anton Joseph Cermak (May 9, 1873 – March 6, 1933) was an American politician who served as the 44th Mayor of Chicago from 1931 until he was fatally wounded in 1933 by Giuseppe Zangara, who was trying to assassinate President-elect Franklin D. Roosevelt.

A 1994 survey of experts on Chicago politics assessed Cermak as one of the ten best mayors in the city's history. (Note: The others in the top-ten were Richard J. Daley (mayor 1955–76); Richard M. Daley (then-incumbent mayor since 1989); Edward Fitzsimmons Dunne (mayor 1905–07); Carter Harrison III (mayor 1879–1887 and 1893); Carter Harrison IV (mayor 1897–1905 and 1911–15); Edward Joseph Kelly (mayor 1933–47); William B. Ogden (mayor 1837–38); Harold Washington (mayor 1983–87); John Wentworth (mayor 1857–58 and 1860–61))

== Early life ==
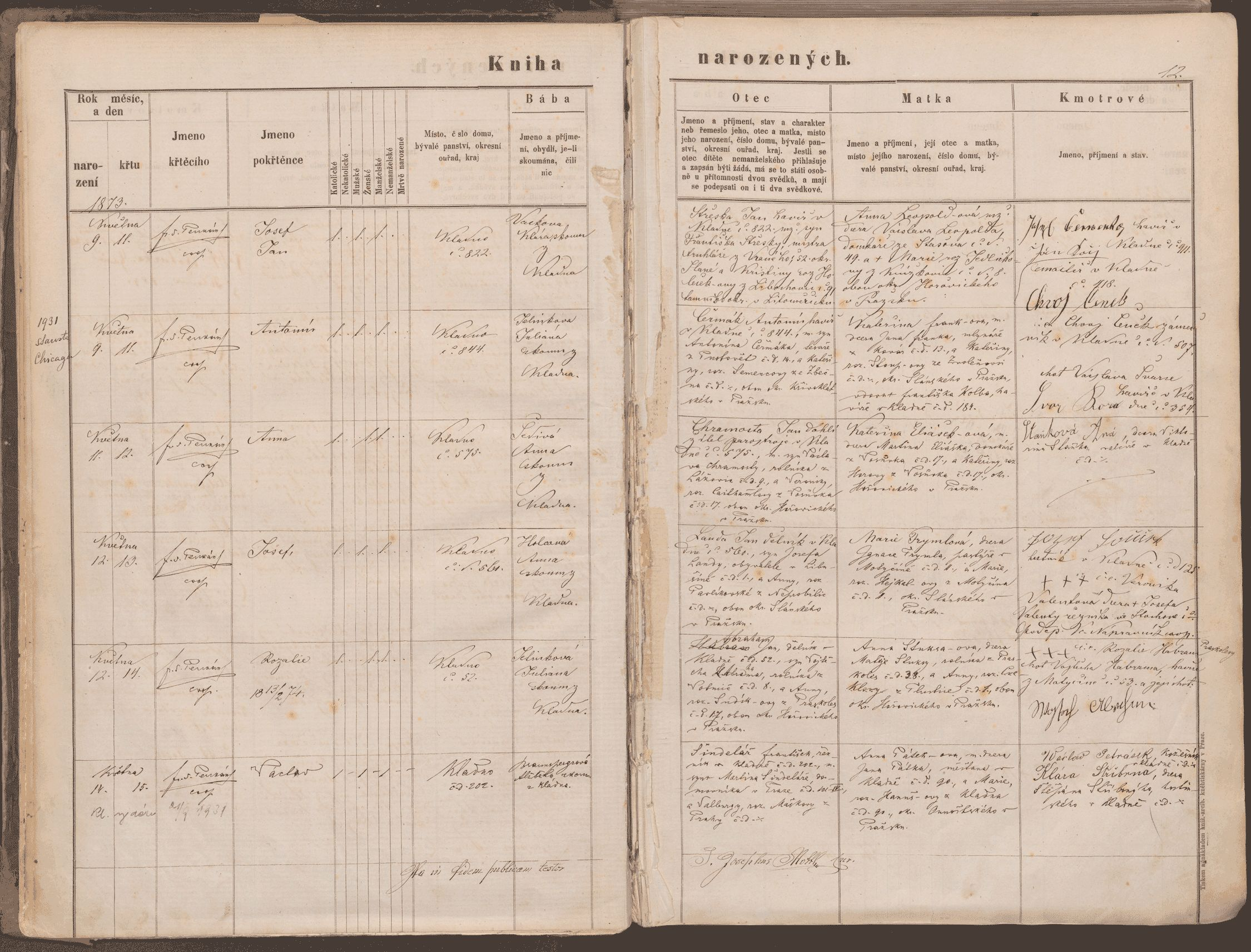
Antonín Čermák birth record 1873

Anton Joseph Cermak was born to a mining family in Kladno, Austria-Hungary (now in the Czech Republic), the son of Antonín Čermák and Kateřina née Frank(ová).

He immigrated with his parents to the United States in 1874, and grew up in the town of Braidwood, Illinois, where he was educated before beginning to work full time while still a teenager. He followed his father into coal mining, and labored at mines in Will and Grundy counties. After moving to Chicago at age 16, Cermak worked as a tow boy for the horse-drawn streetcar line, (Note: A tow boy was positioned with a horse at the bottom of a hill on a streetcar route. When a car began to ascend, the tow boy would hitch his horse to it and provide extra pulling power to the top, then return to the bottom to await the next car.) and then tended horses in the stables of Chicago's Pilsen neighborhood. During the early years of his working life, Cermak supplemented his education with evening high school and business college classes.

== Early career ==
After saving enough money to buy his own horse and cart, he went into business selling firewood, and subsequently expanded his venture into a haulage business. As he became more politically active, Cermak served in municipal government jobs, including as a clerk in the city police court, and as a bailiff for the Municipal Court of Chicago. As his political fortunes began to rise, Cermak was able to avail himself of other business opportunities, including interests in real estate, insurance, and banking.

Cermak began his political career as a Democratic Party precinct captain, and in 1902, he was elected to the Illinois House of Representatives. Seven years later, in 1909 he was elected to the Chicago City Council as an alderman of the 12th Ward. He was re-elected in 1911. In December 1912, he resigned from the city council in order to accept a position as bailiff of the Chicago Municipal Court. In 1918, Cermak unsuccessfully ran as the Democratic nominee for Cook County sheriff. He narrowly lost to Republican nominee Charles W. Peters.

Cermak was elected in 1919 to again represent the 12th ward on the city council, and was re-elected in 1921. He was elected president of the Cook County Board of Commissioners in 1922, and resigned from the city council in order to assume office as county president on December 4. He was elected the chairman of the Cook County Democratic Party in 1928. Also in 1928, he was the Democratic nominee for a seat in the United States Senate, but was defeated by Republican Otis F. Glenn, 54.46% to 44.94%.

== Mayor of Chicago (1931–1933) ==
Cermak won election as mayor of Chicago in 1931. His mayoral victory came during the Great Depression, the deep resentment many Chicagoans had of Prohibition, and the increasing violence resulting from organized crime's control of Chicago—typified by the St. Valentine's Day Massacre.

The many ethnic groups, such as Czechs, Poles, Ukrainians, Jews, Italians, and African Americans, who began to settle in Chicago in the early 1900s were mostly detached from the political system, due in part to a lack of organization, which led to underrepresentation in the City Council. As an immigrant himself, Cermak recognized Chicago's relatively new immigrants as a significant population of disenfranchised voters, which had the potential to be a large power base for him and his local Democratic organization.

Before Cermak, the Democratic Party in Cook County was run by Irish Americans. The Irish first became successful in politics since they spoke English, and because, coming from an island on the edge of Europe, they had few ancestral enemies. As the old saying went: "A Lithuanian won’t vote for a Pole, and a Pole won’t vote for a Lithuanian. A German won’t vote for either of them. But all three will vote for a turkey—an Irishman." As Cermak climbed the local political ladder, the resentment of the party leadership grew. When the bosses rejected his bid to become the mayoral candidate, Cermak swore revenge. He formed his political army from the non-Irish elements.

Cermak's political and organizational skills helped create one of the most influential political organizations of his day. With support from Franklin D. Roosevelt on the national level, Cermak gradually wooed members of Chicago's growing black community into the Democratic fold. Walter Wright, the superintendent of parks and aviation for the city of Chicago, aided Cermak in stepping into office.

When Cermak challenged the incumbent, William Hale "Big Bill" Thompson, in the 1931 mayor's race, Thompson, who represented Chicago's existing Irish-dominated power structure, responded with an ethnic slur–filled ditty that ridiculed his teamster past (pushing a pushcart):

I won't take a back seat to that Bohunk, Chairmock, Chermack, or whatever his name is.
Tony, Tony, where's your pushcart at?
Can you picture a World’s Fair mayor with a name like that?

Cermak replied, "He doesn’t like my name… it’s true I didn’t come over on the Mayflower, but I came over as soon as I could." It was a sentiment to which ethnic Chicagoans could relate, and Thompson's prejudicial insults largely backfired.

Thompson's reputation as a buffoon, many voters’ disgust with the corruption of his political machine, and his inability or unwillingness to clean up organized crime in Chicago were cited as major factors in Cermak capturing 58% of the vote in the mayoral election on April 6, 1931. Cermak's victory finished Thompson as a political power, and largely ended the Republican Party's influence in Chicago; indeed, all the mayors of Chicago since 1931 have been members of the Democratic Party. For nearly his entire administration, Cermak had to deal with a major tax revolt. From 1931 to 1933, the Association of Real Estate Taxpayers mounted a "tax strike."

At its height, the association, which was headed by John M. Pratt and James E. Bistor, had over 30,000 members. Much to Cermak's dismay, it successfully slowed down the collection of real estate taxes through litigation and the promotion of the refusal to pay. In the meantime, the city found it difficult to pay teachers and maintain services. Cermak had to meet President-elect Roosevelt to "mend fences," and to request money to fund essential city services.

A 1993 survey of historians, political scientists and urban experts conducted by Melvin G. Holli of the University of Illinois at Chicago ranked Cermak as the twenty-fifth-best American big-city mayor to have served between the years 1820 and 1993. A 1994 survey of experts on Chicago politics saw Cermak ranked as one of the ten best mayors in the city's history (up to that time).

== Murder ==
=== Attack ===
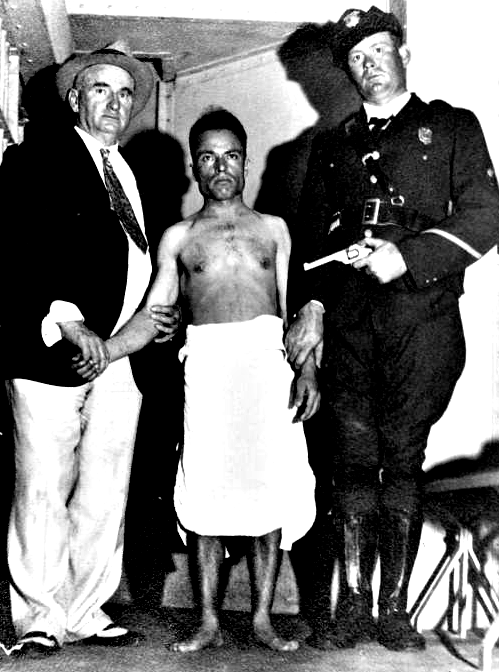
Zangara after his arrest in custody of Dade County Sheriff Dan Hardie (left) and Miami Police Officer Lestron G. "Red" Crews (right) holding the pistol used by Zangara

On February 15, 1933, while shaking hands with President-elect Franklin D. Roosevelt at Bayfront Park in Miami, Florida, Cermak was shot in the lung and mortally wounded by Giuseppe Zangara, who was attempting to assassinate Roosevelt. At the critical moment, Lillian Cross, a woman standing near Zangara, hit Zangara's arm with her purse, and spoiled his aim. In addition to Cermak, Zangara hit four other people: Margaret Kruis, 21, of Newark, NJ, shot through the hand; Russell Caldwell, 22, of Miami, hit squarely in the forehead by a spent bullet, which embedded itself under the skin; Mabel Gill of Miami, shot in the abdomen; and William Sinnott, a New York police detective, who received a glancing blow to the forehead and scalp. All four of those injuries were minor.

Once at the hospital, Cermak reportedly uttered the line that was engraved on his tomb, saying to Roosevelt, "I'm glad it was me, not you." The Chicago Tribune reported the quote without attributing it to a witness, and most scholars doubt that it was ever said.

Zangara told the police that he hated rich and powerful people, but not Roosevelt personally. Later, rumors circulated that Cermak, not Roosevelt, had been the intended target, as his promise to clean up Chicago's rampant lawlessness posed a threat to Al Capone and the Chicago organized crime syndicate. One of the first people to suggest the organized crime theory was reporter Walter Winchell, who happened to be in Miami the evening of the shooting. According to Roosevelt biographer Jean Edward Smith, there is no proof for this theory.

Long-time Chicago newsman Len O’Connor offers a different view of the events surrounding the mayor's assassination. He has written that aldermen Paddy Bauler and Charlie Weber informed him that relations between Cermak and Roosevelt were strained, because Cermak fought Roosevelt's nomination at the Democratic convention in Chicago.

=== Declared death ===
Author Ronald Humble provides yet another perspective as to why Cermak was killed. In his book Frank Nitti: The True Story of Chicago’s Notorious Enforcer, Humble contends that Cermak was as corrupt as Thompson, and that the Chicago Outfit hired Zangara to kill Cermak in retaliation for Cermak's attempt to murder Frank Nitti.

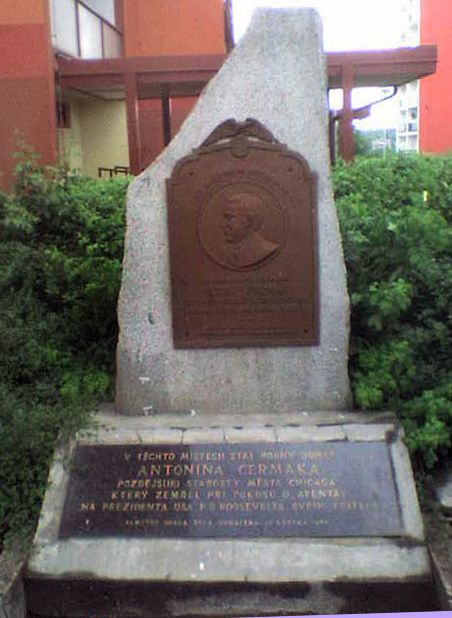
Monument to Anton Cermak in his birth town of Kladno.

Cermak died at Jackson Memorial Hospital in Miami on March 6, partly due to his wounds. On March 30, however, his personal physician, Dr. Karl A. Meyer, revealed that the primary cause of Cermak's death was ulcerative colitis, commenting, "The mayor would have recovered from the bullet wound had it not been for the complication of colitis. The autopsy disclosed the wound had healed ... the other complications were not directly due to the bullet wound." Doubts were raised at the time and later concerning whether the bullet wound directly contributed to his death. A theory raised decades later contended that the bullet had actually caused damage to his colon which led to perforation which was undiagnosed by his doctors. It alleged that "but for [the] physicians' blunders" Cermak might have survived. This theory was refuted by a later medical analysis of the event.

Zangara was convicted of murder after Cermak's death under the law of transferred intent, and was executed in Florida's electric chair on March 20, 1933.

=== Funeral and burial ===
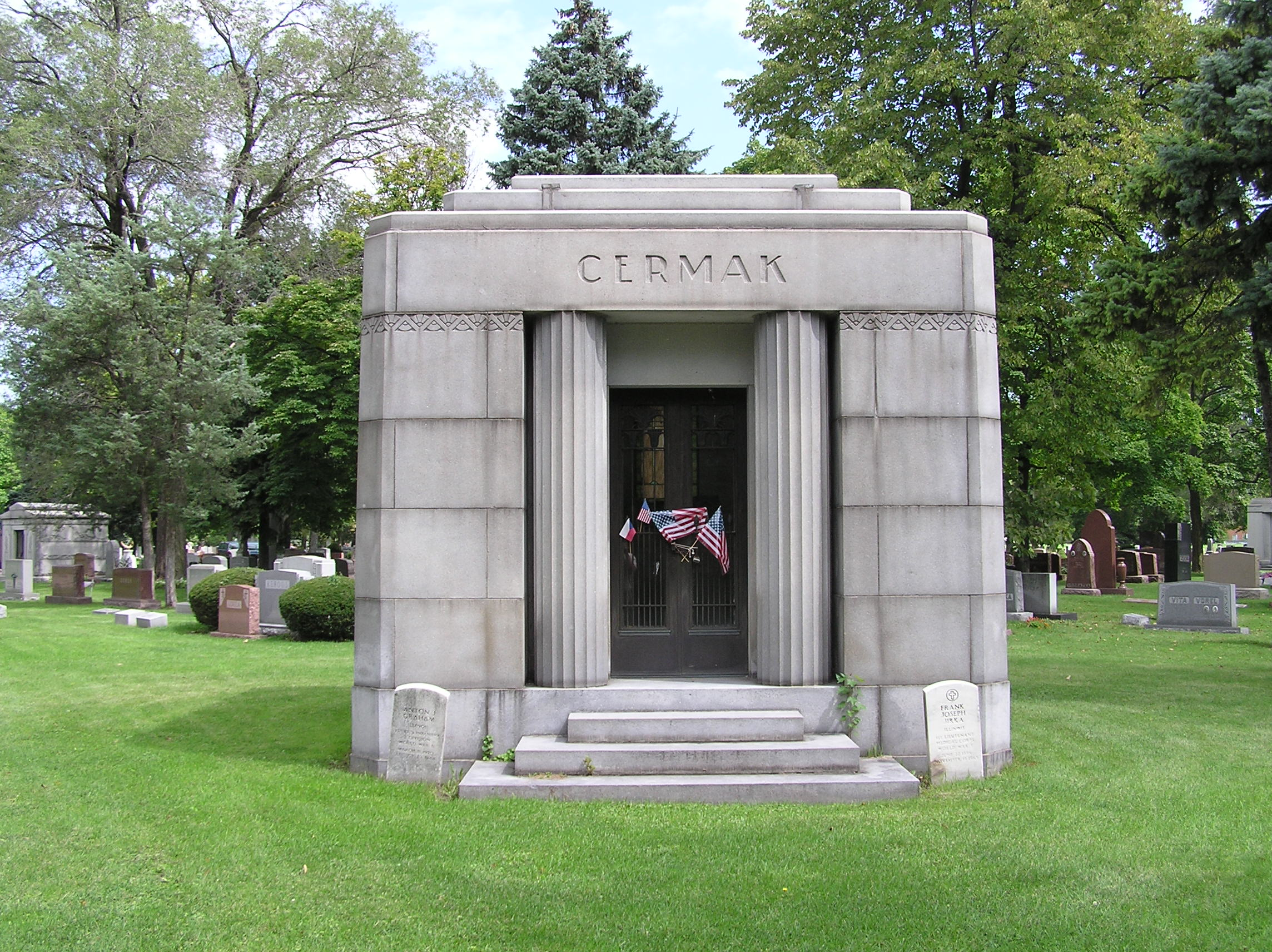
Anton Cermak's tomb at Bohemian National Cemetery in Chicago.

Cermak first lay in state in Miami. His remains were then transported to Chicago in a solid bronze casket placed in the baggage car of a funeral train operated by the Illinois Central. The casket was decorated with bunting and draped with an American flag. The train was transported to its destination by honorary escort.

Family members and associates of Cermak rode on the train. Sixteen members of the Chicago City Council served as pallbearers for the heavy casket, carrying it off the train, through a cordon of military members and American Legionnaires, and into an automobile hearse. The hearse was then followed by two fire trucks, carrying flowers that had been transported to Chicago aboard the funeral car. At least 50,000 people gathered on the streets near the Central Station in Chicago to greet the return of his remains to the city at 10 am local time on March 8. The United Press reported that along Michigan Avenue, crowds were "aligned 10 deep...and overflowed into Grant Park.

On March 10, Cermak's non-sectarian funeral service was held at the Chicago Stadium arena. Crowds were described as exceeding the venue's 25,000 spectator seating capacity. The services were short, and featured eulogies by Governor Henry Horner, Reverend John Thompson (First United Methodist Church of Chicago), Father Daniel Frawley (St. Jerome Croatian Catholic Church), and Rabbi Louis Mann (Chicago Sinai Congregation). The service was followed by a procession between the arena and Chicago's Bohemian National Cemetery along a route 12 miles (19 km) in length, with approximately 50,000 marchers forming a marching line that measured 5 miles (8.0 km). The procession was spectated by hundreds of thousands. Cermak was interred in a family mausoleum at Bohemian National Cemetery.

=== Aftermath ===
The mayor's death was followed by a struggle for succession both to his party chairmanship, and for the mayor's office.

A plaque honoring Cermak still lies at the site of the assassination in Miami's Bayfront Park. It is inscribed with Cermak's alleged words to Roosevelt after he was shot, "I'm glad it was me instead of you." Following Cermak's death, 22nd Street—a major east–west artery that traversed Chicago's West Side, and the close-in suburbs of Cicero and Berwyn, areas with significant Czech populations—was renamed Cermak Road. In 1943, a Liberty ship, the SS A. J. Cermak was named in Cermak's honor. It was scrapped in 1964.

== Descendants ==
Cermak's son-in-law, Otto Kerner Jr., served as the 33rd Governor of Illinois, and as a federal circuit judge.

His grandson, Frank J. Jirka, Jr., who was with him in Miami when he was assassinated, later became an Underwater Demolition Team officer in the United States Navy. Jirka was awarded a Silver Star and Purple Heart for his actions during the Battle of Iwo Jima; the wounds he suffered led to the amputation of both legs below the knee. After World War II, he became a physician, and in 1983, was elected president of the American Medical Association. Cermak's great niece, Kajon Cermak, is a radio broadcaster. His daughter, Lillian, was married to Richey V. Graham, who served in the Illinois General Assembly.

== In popular culture ==
- A hastily produced movie about Cermak, The Man Who Dared, was released within months of his death.
- There was a made-for-TV movie, The Gun of Zangara, about Cermak's assassination. It was originally a two-part episode of The Untouchables, where it had the title "The Unhired Assassin." Cermak had a major role in the story as an honest man, and was played by Robert Middleton.
- Cermak is mentioned in Stephen Sondheim’s musical Assassins during the song "How I Saved Roosevelt."
- Cermak and his rise to the mayoralty has also been mentioned in Jeffrey Archer’s novel Kane and Abel.
- Part of the episode "Objects in Motion" of the television series Babylon 5 is based on the circumstances of Cermak’s death.
- Cermak is referenced by Kelsey Grammer’s fictional Chicago mayor, Tom Kane, in several episodes of the Starz TV series Boss.
- In "Red Team III," the seventh episode in the second season of HBO's The Newsroom, Will McAvoy (Jeff Daniels) references Anton Cermak.
- The history-based crime novel True Detective, the first in Max Allan Collins' Nathan Heller series, includes a fictionalized account of the Cermak slaying.
- In the first episode of the second season of F Is for Family, an adult animated sitcom produced for Netflix, the fictional school of Anton Cermak Tech is mentioned during a broadcast.
- In The Untouchables TV series (1993–1994), Cermak is assassinated by Zangara—a crazy lone gunman targeting FDR—after Ness prevents the assassin they believe was sent by Capone. After the Untouchables return to Chicago, their further investigation reveals a probable third gunman, whose shot actually is responsible for Cermak's death, and was a Capone hitman. The first half of the next episode partly involves Ness' Untouchables identifying the actual gunman (a Capone hitman named Charlie Ross), who goes into hiding after a raid by the Untouchables. As the Untouchables arrange to bring him in for testimony, he is gunned down, thereby forever silencing the truth about the mob killing the mayor.

== See also ==
- List of assassinated American politicians

== General and cited sources ==
- Beito, David T. Taxpayers in Revolt: Tax Resistance During the Great Depression. Chapel Hill: University of North Carolina Press, 1989. ISBN 978-0807818367.
- Pacyga, Dominic A. (2025). Clout City: The Rise and Fall of the Chicago Political Machine. University of Chicago Press.

Political offices
Preceded by Daniel Ryan Sr.	President of the Cook County Board of Commissioners; 1922–1931	Succeeded by Emmett Whealan
Preceded by William Hale Thompson	Mayor of Chicago; 1931–1933	Succeeded by Frank J. Corr
Party political offices
Preceded by George E. Brennan	Democratic nominee for U.S. Senator from Illinois (Class 3); 1928	Succeeded by William H. Dieterich
