= Daniel Ryan Sr. =

American politician

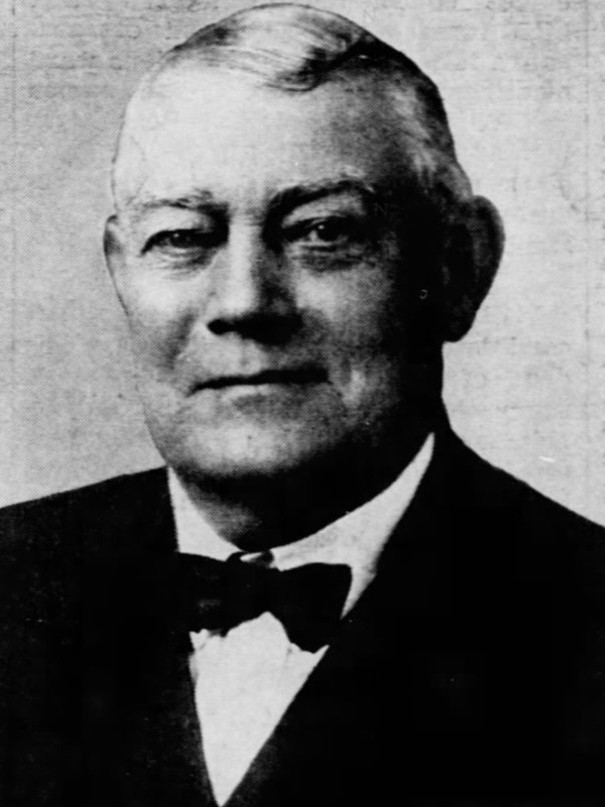

President of the Cook County Board of Commissioners
- In office February 26, 1921 – December 1922
- Preceded by: Peter Reinberg
- Succeeded by: Anton Cermak

Member of the Cook County Board of Commissioners
- In office December 1918 – June 13, 1923
- Succeeded by: Dan Ryan Jr.

Personal details
- Born: 1861 or 1862 County Tipperary, Ireland
- Died: June 13, 1923 (aged 61) Chicago, Illinois
- Party: Democratic
- Relatives: Dan Ryan Jr. (son)

Daniel Ryan Sr. (1861/1862–1923) was an Irish-American politician who served as a member and president of the Cook County Board of Commissioners.

== Biography ==
Ryan was born in County Tipperary, Ireland. In his early twenties, he moved to Chicago, settling in the Englewood neighborhood.

In his early career in Chicago, he worked at the Union Stock Yards. At the Union Stock Yards, he would quickly become a successful buyer. He would later become a cement contractor.

He would become a prominent Democratic politician, becoming the party's leader in Chicago's 32nd ward.

Ryan was a charter member of the Englewood Council of the Knights of Columbus. He also was a 4th degree member of the LaSalle Assembly, a member of the St. Bernard's Holy Name Society, and a member of the Catholic Order of Foresters.

In 1912, there was a split in the local Democratic Party, with those allied with Roger C. Sullivan and Edward Fitzsimmons Dunne being divided against those who were allied with Carter Harrison IV and William Randolph Hearst. Ryan allied himself with Harrison and Hearst.

=== Cook County Board of Commissioners ===
Ryan served on the Cook County Board of Commissioners for nine years. He was elected to the board as a member from the city of Chicago in 1914. He would be reelected as a commissioner in 1918 and 1922.

Ryan was a leading figure in the early development of the Forest Preserve District of Cook County.

After the 1921 death in office of board president Peter Reinberg, Ryan was selected to finish his term as board president. He formally assumed the office on February 26, 1921. He had been selected unanimously by the members of the board. He served until the end of Reinberg's term in December 1922. During his tenure of board president, the county led United States counties in road paving, and the county built a new juvenile home.

Anton J. Cermak was chosen for the 1922 Democratic nomination for county board president over Ryan when the Democratic Party of Cook County organization selected their slate, a move that Parke Brown of the Chicago Tribune attributed to Ryan's "alliance with Thompsonism".

=== Death ===
On May 26, 1923, Ryan was hospitalized after suffering a "stroke of apoplexy". Ryan died June 12, 1923, at the University of Chicago Medical Center. He was 61 years old. Ryan was survived by his wife, Alice, five sons, and a daughter. He was buried at Chicago's Mount Olivet Cemetery.

Dan Ryan Jr., Ryan's own son, was elected to fill his seat on the Cook County Board of Commissioners.

In 1924, the Beverly Hills preserve of the Forest Preserve District of Cook County was renamed "Daniel Ryan Woods" after him.
