= Dan Ryan Jr. =

American politician

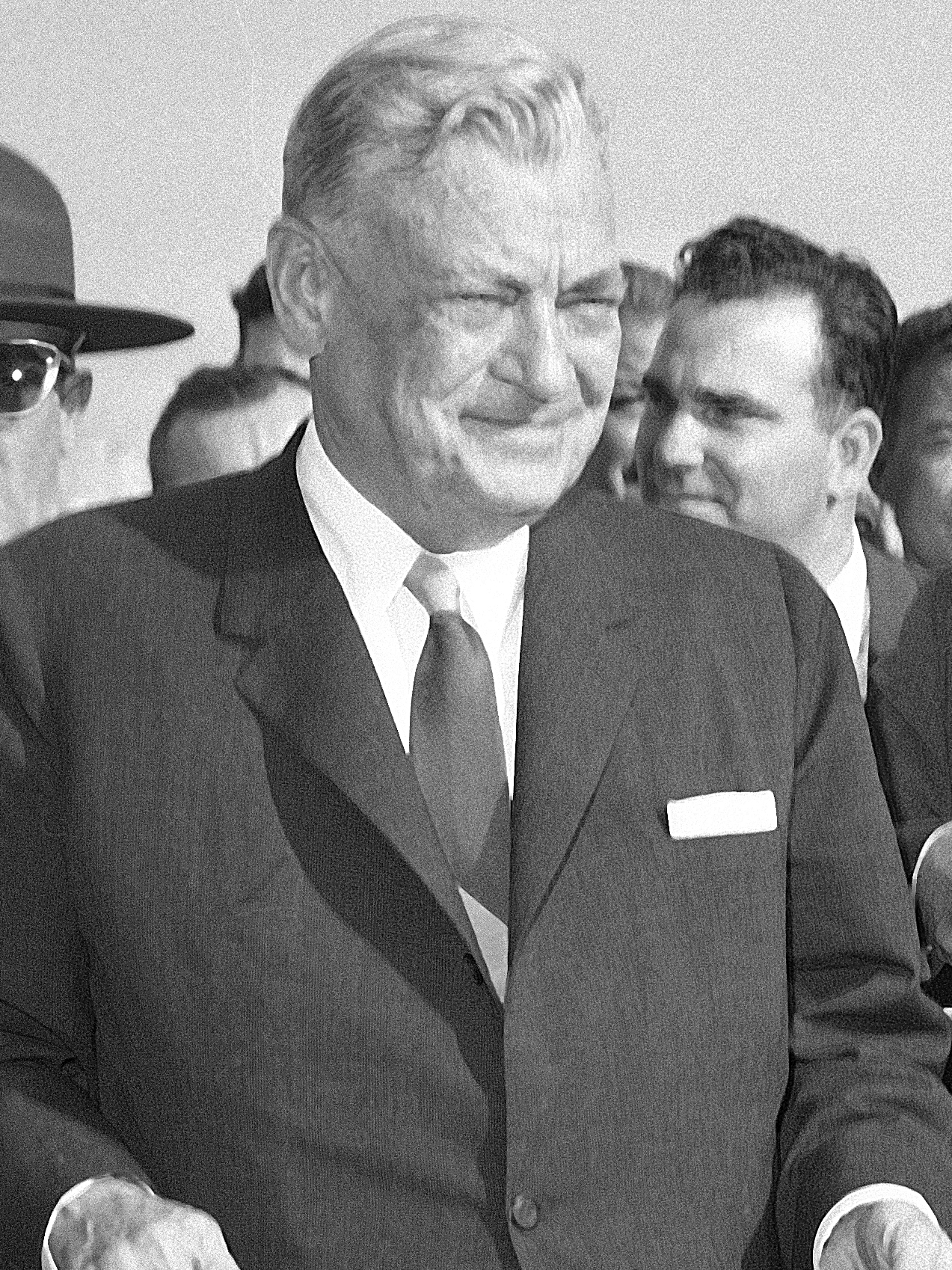
- Ryan in 1960

President of the Cook County Board of Commissioners
- In office 1954–1961
- Preceded by: William N. Erickson
- Succeeded by: John J. Duffy

Member of the Cook County Board of Commissioners
- In office 1930–1961
- Succeeded by: Ruby H. O'Connor Ryan
- In office 1923–1926
- Preceded by: Daniel Ryan Sr.

Personal details
- Born: Daniel B. Ryan Jr. 1894 Chicago, Illinois
- Died: April 8, 1961 (aged 66) Cook County, Illinois
- Party: Democratic
- Spouse: Ruby H. O'Connor Ryan
- Children: 1
- Education: Chicago-Kent College of Law (LLB)

Military service
- Branch/service: United States Navy
- Battles/wars: World War I

Daniel B. Ryan Jr. (1894 – April 8, 1961) was an American businessman, lawyer, and Democrat politician who twice served on the Cook County Board of Commissioners, first from 1923 to 1926 and again from 1930 to 1961, the year of his death. In the city of Chicago, Illinois, the Dan Ryan Expressway is named in his honor.

== Early life and education ==
Daniel B, Ryan Jr. was born in 1894. His father, Daniel Ryan Sr. (1861–1923) was a Chicago politician who became president of the Cook County Board of Commissioners. (1921–1922). Moreover, a forest preserve in the South Side of Chicago is named the Daniel Ryan Woods in honor of the politician Daniel Ryan Sr.

Ryan attended the De La Salle Institute and earned a law degree from Kent College of Law. Ryan also served in the United States Navy during World War I.

== Career ==
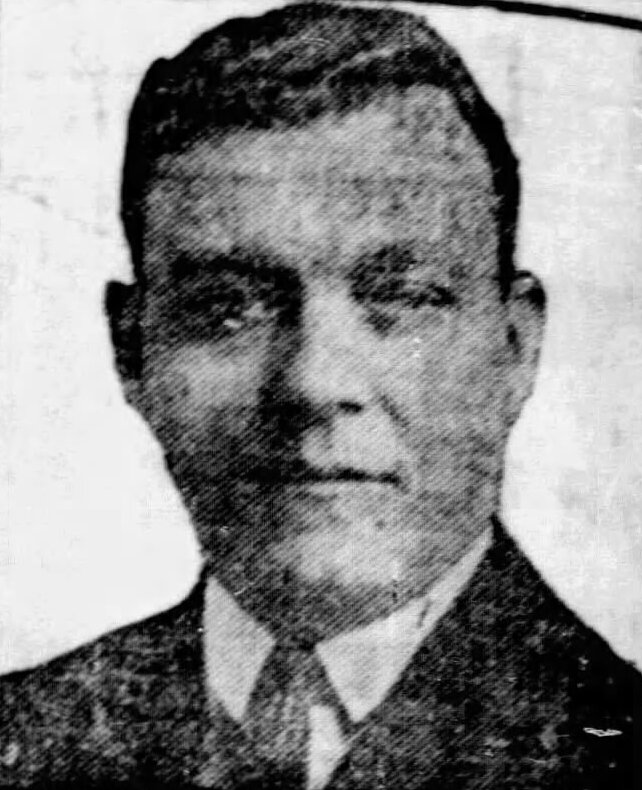
Ryan (circa 1923)

After Dan Ryan Sr. died in 1923 and the board elected Ryan Jr. to fulfill the remainder of his father's presidential term. From 1926 to 1930, Ryan operated an insurance business before running for election to the Cook County commission in 1930. Upon election, Ryan served on the Roads and Bridges Committee and on the Finance Committee. As chairman of the Roads and Bridges Committee Ryan proposed the construction of a superhighway that traversed the city of Chicago. Moreover, Ryan's success allowed aspirations to run for respective election as Mayor of Chicago and as Governor of Illinois; however, Ryan's political career did not include those offices of public service.

In 1954, as the president of the Cook County Board of Commissioners, Dan Ryan Jr. implemented a program to fund and finance the construction of the superhighways he had promoted and proposed for metropolitan Chicago and Cook County; however, obtaining sufficient funding (federal or state) for road construction projects was difficult before creation of the Interstate Highway System, in 1956; hence, in 1955, Ryan issued municipal bonds to fund and finance the start of construction of superhighways in Cook County.

He won re-election in 1958 and planned to run for another term at the time of his death.

== Personal life ==
He was married to Ruby H. O'Connor Ryan (1902–1998) and had one son, Daniel Ryan III. She succeeded him on the commission as board member and served until 1981. On April 8, 1961, Ryan died from a heart attack. Eighteen months after his death, in December 1962, the stretch of highway that he fought to build opened as the Dan Ryan Expressway. Ryan is buried in the family plot at Holy Sepulchre Cemetery alongside his father, mother and wife.

In 2018, Dan Ryan III criticized a proposal from Bill Daley, who was running for mayor, to rename the Dan Ryan Expressway after former President Barack Obama.

Preceded by William N. Erickson	Cook County Board President; 1954–1961	Succeeded by John J. Duffy
