= Otis F. Glenn =

American politician (1879–1959)

Otis Ferguson Glenn
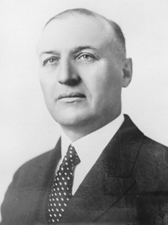

United States Senator from Illinois
- In office December 3, 1928 – March 3, 1933
- Preceded by: William B. McKinley
- Succeeded by: William H. Dieterich

Personal details
- Born: August 27, 1879 Mattoon, Illinois
- Died: March 11, 1959 (aged 79) Portage Point, Michigan
- Party: Republican
- Spouse: Anna Kennedy Martin (1892-1984)

Otis Ferguson Glenn (August 27, 1879 – March 11, 1959) was a Republican United States senator from the State of Illinois.

He was born in Mattoon, Illinois on August 27, 1879. After graduating from law school in 1900 from the University of Illinois at Urbana-Champaign, he began practicing law in Murphysboro. He served two terms as the State's Attorney for Jackson County, once from 1906 to 1908 and again from 1916 to 1920. He was elected as a member of State Senate in 1920, serving for one term, until 1924.

In 1928, when Frank L. Smith resigned the U.S. Senate seat he had won in 1926, after twice having his credentials refused by the Senate, Glenn defeated future Chicago mayor and Democrat Anton Cermak in a special election, 54.5 to 44.9 percent respectively, to serve out Smith's term. Glenn served as the U.S. senator for Illinois from December 3, 1928, to March 3, 1933. When Glenn ran for re-election in 1932, he was defeated by Democrat William H. Dieterich, 46.0 to 52.2 percent respectively. Glenn ran, unsuccessfully, in 1936 as well, being defeated by Democratic incumbent J. Hamilton Lewis, 40.7 to 56.5 percent respectively. Upon returning to Illinois, he established a law practice in Chicago.

Glenn died on March 11, 1959, at Portage Point in Onekama Township, Michigan. Glenn's body was interred at Onekama Cemetery in Onekama, Michigan.

Party political offices
Preceded by Frank L. Smith	Republican nominee for U.S. Senator from Illinois (Class 3); 1928, 1932	Succeeded by Richard J. Lyons
Preceded by Ruth Hanna McCormick	Republican nominee for U.S. Senator from Illinois (Class 2); 1936	Succeeded by Charles W. Brooks
U.S. Senate
Preceded by Frank L. Smith (not allowed to take a seat)	U.S. senator (Class 3) from Illinois; 1928–1933; Served alongside: Charles S. Deneen, J. Hamilton Lewis	Succeeded by William H. Dieterich
