= List of presidents of the Cook County Board of Commissioners =

Chief executive of county government in Cook County, Illinois

President of the Cook County Board of Commissioners
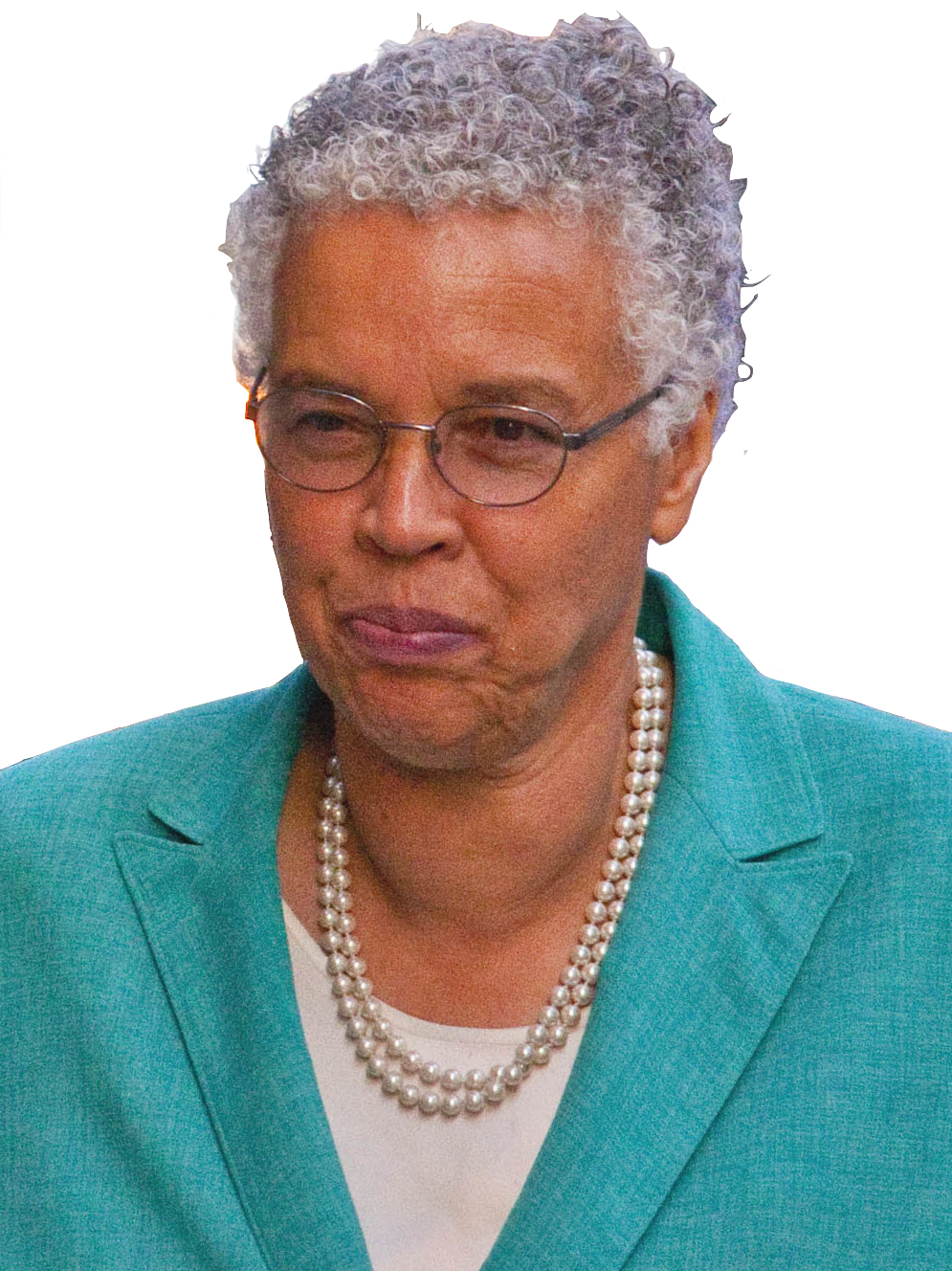
- Incumbent; Toni Preckwinkle since December 6, 2010
- Term length: 4 years

The president of the Cook County Board of Commissioners is the chief executive of county government in Cook County, Illinois. They are the head of the Cook County Board of Commissioners. The president is chosen in a county-wide general election for a four-year term, without term limits, at the same time that the county elects single-district board members.

== Office description ==
Duties of the president include presenting a balanced budget to the board for approval, as well as overseeing County Board meetings and the Bureaus of Offices Under the President. This grants them the ability to veto or approve ordinances and resolutions, as well as the ability to appoint certain employees to the Cook County administration, though they may need the consent of the board to do so.

Additionally, the president must present an annual report to the board on county affairs and its finances, which would require reports and an examination of Cook County administrative units, as well as their properties. The president is also able to enter into intergovernmental agreements as well as agreements with the private sector with the consent and advice of the board.

While the 1970 state constitution of Illinois permits all counties to directly elect their chief executive, Cook County is the only one that does so. Under the constitution, any county that directly elects its chief executive is a home rule county. Because Cook County already elected its county president, when the constitution went into effect, it was the only county that automatically became a home rule county (by virtue of having a directly-elected chief executive).

== Officeholders ==
President (Note: The History of Cook County (1884) and contemporaneous newspapers describe the position as "chairman" in the 1870s, and it was elected by the members of the county board (rather than by the voters of the county) until at least 1880. Around 1881, descriptions of the office as "president" began to be published. By (at latest) the county's November 1887 election, it became a county-wide popularly-elected office.)	Term start	Term end	Terms	Years	Party
Julius White	1871	1872	1	1	
Henry B. Miller	1872	1873	1	1	
Samuel Ashton	1873	1874	1	1	
William R. Burdick	1874	1875	1	1	
A. B. Johnson	1875	1876	1	1	
Charles C. P. Holden	1876	1877	1	1	Republican
Henry C. Senne	December 1877	December 1879	2	2	
John Wesley Stewart	December 1879	December 1880	1	1	Republican
D. B. Purington	1880	1881	1	1	
D. W. Clark	1881	1882	1	1	
Adam Ochs	1882	1883	1	1	Democratic
Joseph Donnersberger	1883	1884	1	1	Democratic
Henry C. Senne	1884	1885	1	1	Republican
George C. Klehm	1885	1887	2	2	Republican
J. Frank Aldrich	1887	1887			Republican
Henry C. Senne	1887	1889			Republican
George Edmanson	1889	1890	1	1	
Robert J. Smith	1890	1891	1	1	
John M. Green	1891	1892	1	1	
George Edmanson	1892	1893	1	1	
George Struckman	1893	1894	1	1	
Daniel D. Healy	1894	1898		4	
James C. Irwin	1898	1900		2	
John J. Hanberg	1900	1902		2	
Henry G. Foreman	1902	1904		2	Republican
Edward J. Brundage	1904	1907		3	Republican
William Busse	1907	1910		3	Republican
Peter Bartzen	1910	1912		2	Democratic
Alexander A. McCormick	1912	1914		2	Progressive
Peter Reinberg	1914	1921		7	Democratic
Daniel Ryan Sr.	1921	1922		1	Democratic
Anton Cermak	1922	1931		8¼	Democratic
Emmett Whealan	1931	1934		3	Democratic
Clayton F. Smith	1934	1946		12	Democratic
William N. Erickson	1946	1954		8	Republican
Dan Ryan Jr.	1954	1961		7¼	Democratic
John J. Duffy	1961	1962		¾	Democratic
Seymour Simon	1962	1966	1	4	Democratic
Richard B. Ogilvie	1966	January 1969	¾	3	Republican
George Dunne	January 1969	December 1990	5¼	21	Democratic
Richard Phelan	December 1990	December 1994	1	4	Democratic
John Stroger	December 5, 1994	August 1, 2006	2 7/8	11 1/2	Democratic
Bobbie L. Steele	August 1, 2006	December 4, 2006	1/8	1/2	Democratic
Todd Stroger	December 4, 2006	December 6, 2010	1	4	Democratic
Toni Preckwinkle	December 6, 2010		4*	16*	Democratic

== Recent election results ==
President of the Cook County Board of Commissioners general elections
Year	Winning candidate	Party	Vote (pct)	Opponent	Party	Vote (pct)	Opponent	Party	Vote (pct)	Opponent	Party	Vote (pct)
1986	George Dunne	Democratic	808,126 (60.61%)	Joseph D. Matthewson	Republican	525,288 (39.39%)						
1990	Richard J. Phelan	Democratic	714,638 (55.65%)	Aldo DeAngelis	Republican	405,771 (31.60%)	Barbara J. Norman	Harold Washington Party	163,817 (12.76%)			
1994	John H. Stroger, Jr.	Democratic		Joe Morris	Republican		Aloysius Majerczyk	Harold Washington Party		Jerome Carter	Populist	
1998	John H. Stroger, Jr.	Democratic	834,972 (63.49%)	Aurelia Marie Pucinski	Republican	480,191 (36.61%)						
2002	John H. Stroger, Jr.	Democratic	901,679 (68.73%)	Christopher A. Bullock	Republican	410,155 (31.27%)						
2006	Todd H. Stroger	Democratic	690,945 (53.68%)	Tony Peraica	Republican	596,212 (46.32%)						
2010	Toni Preckwinkle	Democratic	939,056 (69.54%)	Roger A. Keats	Republican	357,070 (26.44%)	Thomas Tresser	Green	54,273 (4.02%)			
2014	Toni Preckwinkle	Democratic	1,072,886 (100%)									
2018	Toni Preckwinkle	Democratic	1,355,407 (96.11%)	Others	Write-ins	54,917 (3.89%)						
2022	Toni Preckwinkle	Democratic	967,062 (68.54%)	Bob Fioretti	Republican	399,339 (28.30%)	Thea Tsatsos	Libertarian	44,615 (3.16%)			
