= Attorney General Hamlin =

Attorney General Hamlin may refer to:

- Hannibal E. Hamlin (1858–1938), Attorney General of Maine
- Howland J. Hamlin (1850–1909), Attorney General of Illinois
