= Elmer Jacob Schnackenberg =

American judge (1889–1968)

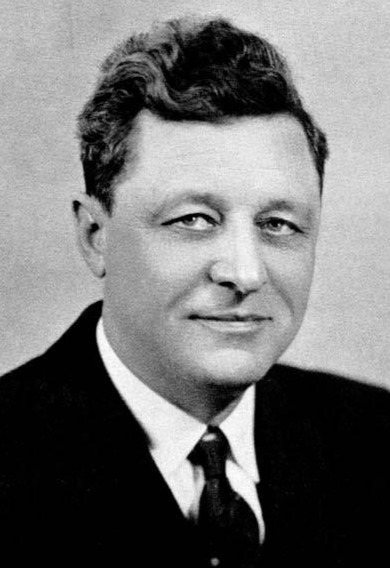
- Schnackenberg in 1941

Judge of the United States Court of Appeals for the Seventh Circuit
- In office November 17, 1953 – September 15, 1968 (died)
- Appointed by: Dwight D. Eisenhower
- Preceded by: Otto Kerner Sr.
- Succeeded by: John Paul Stevens

54th Speaker of the Illinois House of Representatives
- In office January 8, 1941 – January 3, 1945
- Preceded by: Hugh W. Cross
- Succeeded by: Hugh Green

Personal details
- Born: Elmer Jacob Schnackenberg; August 22, 1889 Indianapolis, Indiana, U.S.
- Died: September 15, 1968 (aged 79) Chicago Heights, Illinois, U.S.
- Resting place: Oak Woods Cemetery, Chicago
- Party: Republican; Progressive (1913–1915)
- Spouse: Hazel Elva Bard (m. 1916–1968)
- Children: 5
- Education: University of Chicago (LL.B.)
- Profession: Lawyer, politician, judge

Elmer Jacob Schnackenberg (August 22, 1889 – September 15, 1968) was an American lawyer, politician, and jurist from Chicago, Illinois. He served as a judge of the U.S. Seventh Circuit Court of Appeals for the last 15 years of his life, appointed by President Dwight D. Eisenhower in 1953.

Prior to his federal judicial service, he had a long career representing Cook County, Illinois, in the Illinois House of Representatives, and served as the 54th speaker of the Illinois House of Representatives (1941–1945). Between his legislative service and his federal judicial service, he also served eight years as an Illinois circuit court judge for Cook County.

== Education and legal career ==
Born in Indianapolis, Indiana, Schnackenberg received a Bachelor of Laws from the University of Chicago Law School in 1912. He was in private practice in Chicago, Illinois from 1912 to 1945. He was general attorney for the South Park Commissioners in Chicago from 1925 to 1930. He was a Judge on the Circuit Court of Cook County, Illinois from 1945 to 1954.

== Illinois House of Representatives ==
He was a member of the Illinois House of Representatives from 1913 to 1915 and again from 1923 to 1945. In 1912, Schnackenberg was elected to the Illinois House of Representatives as one of three representatives from the 13th district alongside Republican incumbent Benton Kleeman and Socialist candidate Seymour Stedman. He served a single term. He again ran for election to the Illinois House of Representatives again in 1922. He was successful in the election and took office in 1923. He was reelected ten times. He served as House Minority Leader in the 58th and 60th General Assemblies. He served as Speaker of the Illinois House of Representatives in the 62nd and 63rd General Assemblies (1941–1945).

== Federal judicial service ==
Schnackenberg received a recess appointment from President Dwight D. Eisenhower on November 17, 1953, to a seat on the United States Court of Appeals for the Seventh Circuit vacated by Judge Otto Kerner Sr. He was formally nominated to the same seat by President Eisenhower on January 11, 1954. He was confirmed by the United States Senate on February 9, 1954, and received his commission the same day. His service was terminated on September 15, 1968, due to his death.

== Sources ==
Illinois House of Representatives
| Preceded by Hugh W. Cross | Speaker of the Illinois House of Representatives; 1941–1945 | Succeeded by Hugh Green |
Legal offices
| Preceded by Otto Kerner Sr. | Judge of the United States Court of Appeals for the Seventh Circuit; 1953–1968 | Succeeded by John Paul Stevens |
