= Attorney General Bushnell =

Attorney General Bushnell may refer to:

- Robert T. Bushnell (1896–1949), Attorney General of Massachusetts
- Washington Bushnell (1825–1885), Attorney General of Illinois
