= George W. Prince =

American politician (1854–1939)

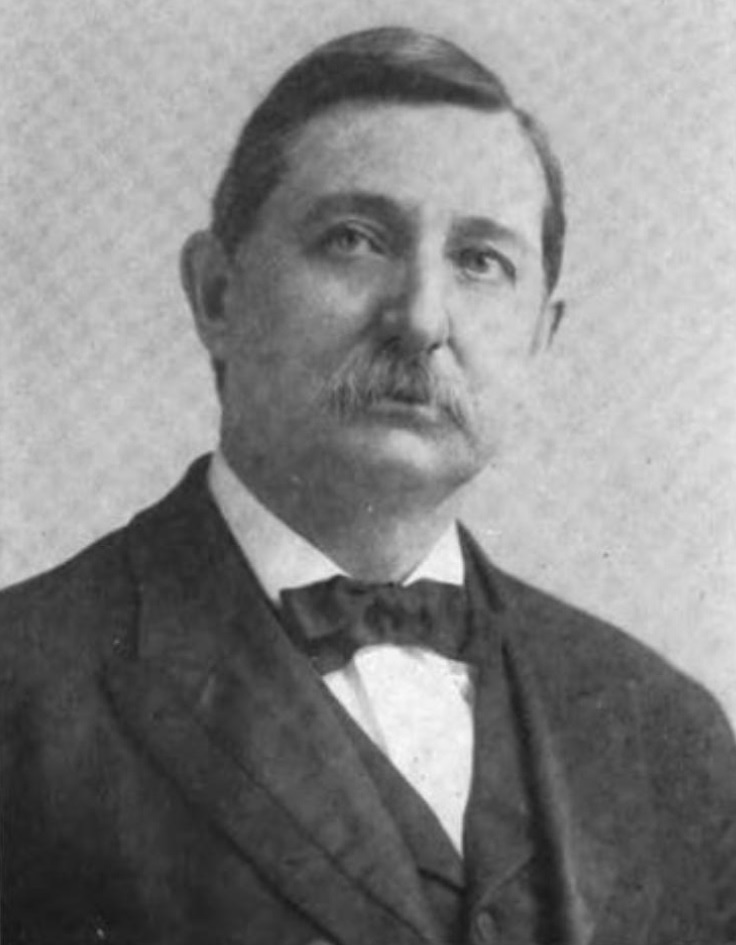
- From September 1909's The Scroll of Phi Delta Theta magazine

Member of the U.S. House of Representatives from Illinois
- In office December 2, 1895 – March 3, 1913
- Preceded by: Philip S. Post (10th); J. Ross Mickey (15th)
- Succeeded by: George E. Foss (10th); Stephen A. Hoxworth (15th)
- Constituency: 10th district (1895-1903); 15th district (1903-13)

Member of the Illinois House of Representatives
- In office 1888-1892

Personal details
- Born: George Washington Prince; March 4, 1854 Tazewell County, Illinois, U.S.
- Died: September 26, 1939 (aged 85) Los Angeles, California, U.S.
- Party: Republican

George Washington Prince (March 4, 1854 – September 26, 1939) was a U.S. representative from Illinois.

Born in Tazewell County, Illinois, Prince attended the public schools. He was graduated from Knox College, Galesburg, Illinois, in 1878. He studied law. He was admitted to the bar in 1880 and commenced practice in Galesburg, Illinois. City attorney of Galesburg 1881–1883. He served as chairman of the Republican county central committee of Knox County in 1884. He served as member of the Illinois House of Representatives in 1888. He was reelected in 1890. He was an unsuccessful candidate for attorney general of Illinois on the Republican ticket in 1892.

Prince was elected as a Republican to the Fifty-fourth Congress to fill the vacancy caused by the death of Philip Sidney Post. He was reelected to the Fifty-fifth and to the seven succeeding Congresses and served from December 2, 1895, to March 3, 1913. He served as chairman of the Committee on Ventilation and Acoustics (Fifty-sixth Congress), Committee on Levees and Improvements of the Mississippi River (Fifty-ninth and Sixtieth Congresses), Committee on Claims (Sixty-first Congress). He was an unsuccessful candidate for reelection in 1912 to the Sixty-third Congress. He moved to Los Angeles, California, in 1913 and continued the practice of law. He retired from active business pursuits in 1917 and resided in Los Angeles, California, until his death in that city on September 26, 1939. He was interred in Inglewood Park Cemetery, Inglewood, California.

Party political offices
Preceded by George Hunt	Republican nominee for Attorney General of Illinois; 1892	Succeeded by Edward C. Akin
U.S. House of Representatives
Preceded by Philip S. Post	Member of the U.S. House of Representatives from Illinois's 10th congressional district December 2, 1895 – March 4, 1903	Succeeded by George E. Foss
Preceded by J. Ross Mickey	Member of the U.S. House of Representatives from Illinois's 15th congressional district March 4, 1903 - March 3, 1913	Succeeded by Stephen A. Hoxworth
