= Otto Kerner =

Otto Kerner is the name of two political figures from Illinois:

- Otto Kerner Sr. (1884–1952), Attorney General of Illinois (1932–1938) & judge on U.S. Court of Appeals for Seventh Circuit (1938–1952)
- Otto Kerner Jr. (1908–1976), Governor of Illinois (1961–1968) & judge on U.S. Court of Appeals for Seventh Circuit (1968–1974)
