= 1948 Illinois elections =

- November 2, 1948

Elections were held in Illinois on Tuesday, November 2, 1948.

Primaries were held April 13, 1948.

== Election information ==
=== Turnout ===
In the primaries, 1,649,655 ballots were cast (745,645 Democratic and 904,010 Republican).

In the general election, 4,075,090 ballots were cast.

== Federal elections ==
=== United States President ===
Illinois voted for the Democratic ticket of Harry S. Truman and Alben W. Barkley.

=== United States Senate ===
Incumbent Republican Charles W. Brooks lost reelection to Democrat Paul Douglas.

=== United States House ===
All 26 Illinois seats in the United States House of Representatives were up for election in 1948.

Illinois had redistricted before this election, eliminating its at-large district.

== State elections ==
=== Governor ===
1948 Illinois gubernatorial election
- November 2, 1948
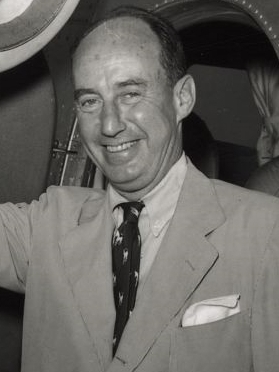

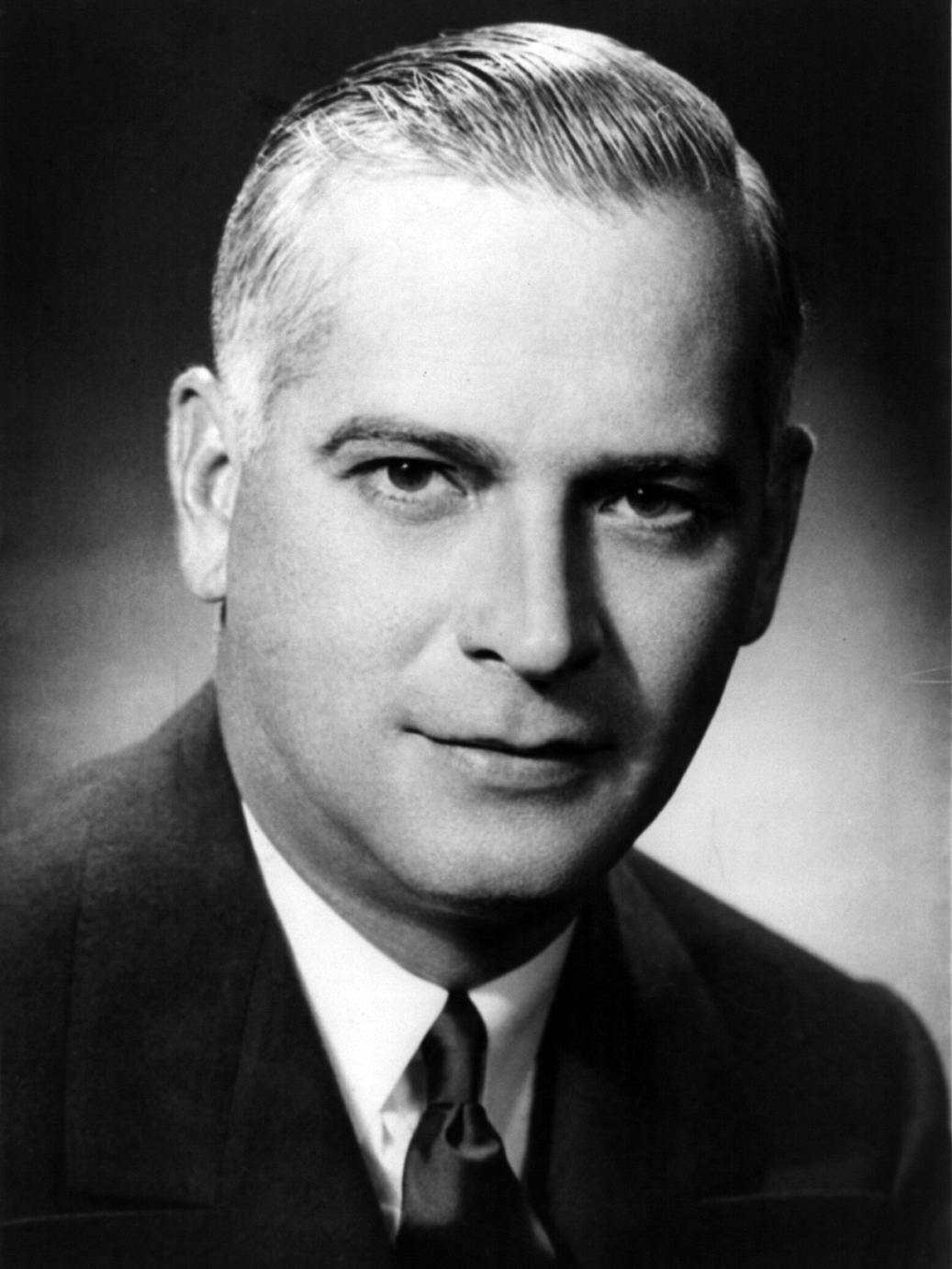
Nominee	Adlai Stevenson II	Dwight H. Green
Party	Democratic	Republican
Popular vote	2,250,074	1,678,007
Percentage	57.11%	42.59%
- County Results; Stevenson: 40–50% 50–60% 60–70% Green: 40–50% 50–60% 60–70%
Governor before election
Dwight H. Green
Republican
Elected Governor
Adlai Stevenson II
Democratic

Incumbent Governor Dwight H. Green, a Republican seeking a third term, lost reelection to Democrat Adlai Stevenson II.

Stevenson's victory was regarded as a surprise upset, and his margin of victory of 572,067 votes was, at the time, record breaking for an Illinois gubernatorial election.

==== General election ====
Gubernatorial election
Party	Candidate	Votes	%
Democratic	Adlai E. Stevenson	2,250,074	57.11
Republican	Dwight H. Green (incumbent)	1,678,007	42.59
Prohibition	Willis Ray Wilson	9,491	0.24
Socialist Labor	Louis Fisher	2,673	0.07
Write-in	Others	12	0.00
Total votes		3,940,257	100

=== Lieutenant governor ===
1948 Illinois lieutenant gubernatorial election
- November 2, 1948
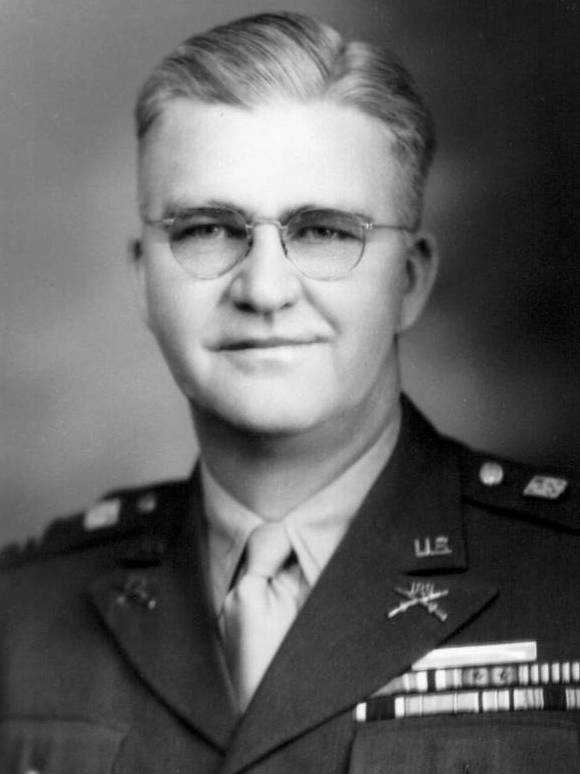

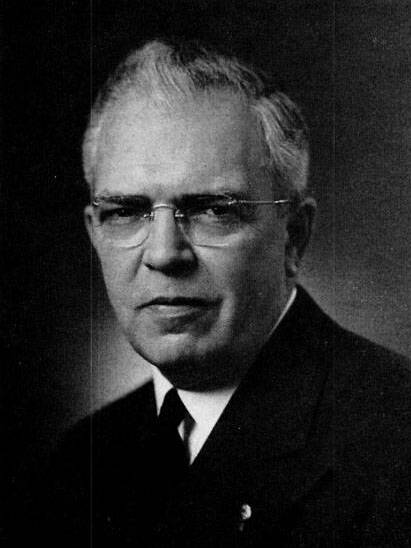
Nominee	Sherwood Dixon	Richard Yates Rowe
Party	Democratic	Republican
Popular vote	1,998,555	1,815,907
Percentage	52.22%	47.45%
Lieutenant Governor before election
Hugh W. Cross
Republican
Elected Lieutenant Governor
Sherwood Dixon
Democratic

Incumbent lieutenant governor Hugh W. Cross, a Republican, did not seek reelection to a third term. Democrat Sherwood Dixon was elected to succeed him in office.

==== Democratic primary ====
Lieutenant gubernatorial Democratic primary
Party	Candidate	Votes	%
Democratic	Sherwood Dixon	578,390	100
Total votes		578,390	100

==== Republican primary ====
Lieutenant gubernatorial Republican primary
Party	Candidate	Votes	%
Republican	Richard Yates Rowe	684,452	100
Write-in	Others	4	0.00
Total votes		684,464	100

==== General election ====
Lieutenant gubernatorial election
Party	Candidate	Votes	%
Democratic	Sherwood Dixon	1,998,555	52.22
Republican	Richard Yates Rowe	1,815,907	47.45
Prohibition	R. B. Campbell	9,949	0.26
Socialist Labor	O. Alfred Olson	2,897	0.08
Write-in	Others	3	0.00
Total votes		3,827,311	100

=== Attorney general ===
1948 Illinois Attorney General election
- November 2, 1948
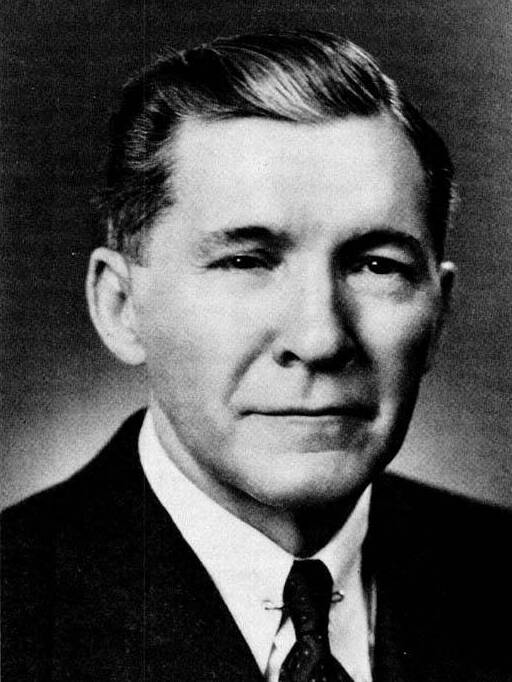

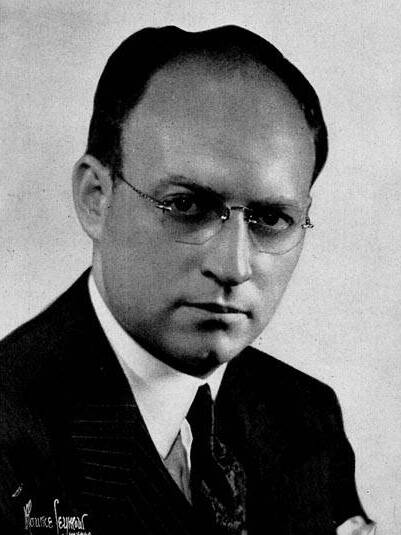
Nominee	Ivan A. Elliott	George F. Barrett
Party	Democratic	Republican
Popular vote	2,019,401	1,806,137
Percentage	52.61%	47.06%
Attorney General before election
George F. Barrett
Republican
Elected Attorney General
Ivan A. Elliott
Democratic

Incumbent attorney general George F. Barrett, a Republican running for a third term, lost to Democrat Ivan A. Elliott

==== Democratic primary ====
Attorney General Democratic primary
Party	Candidate	Votes	%
Democratic	Ivan A. Elliott	283,831	51.85
Democratic	Joseph P. Burke	263,586	48.15
Total votes		547,417	100

==== Republican primary ====
Attorney General Republican primary
Party	Candidate	Votes	%
Republican	George F. Barrett (incumbent)	694,186	100
Write-in	Others	1	0.00
Total votes		694,187	

==== General election ====
Attorney General election
Party	Candidate	Votes	%
Democratic	Ivan A. Elliott	2,019,401	52.61
Republican	George F. Barrett (incumbent)	1,806,137	47.06
Prohibition	Frederick Juchhoff	9,613	0.25
Socialist Labor	Edward C. Gross	3,118	0.08
Write-in	Others	4	0.00
Total votes		3,838,273	100

=== Secretary of State ===
1948 Illinois Secretary of State election
- November 2, 1948
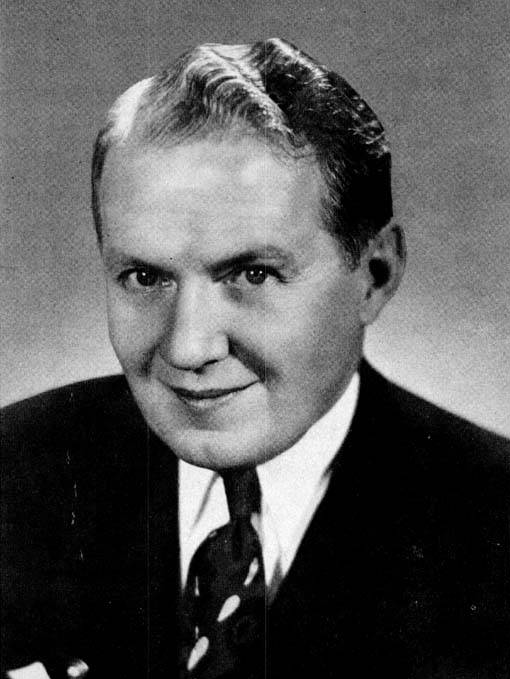

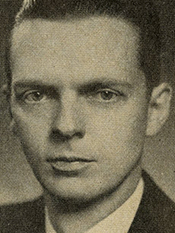
Nominee	Edward J. Barrett	William Stratton
Party	Democratic	Republican
Popular vote	2,120,832	1,759,083
Percentage	54.49%	45.19%
- County results Barrett: 50–60% 60–70% Stratton: 40–50% 50–60% 60–70%
Secretary of State before election
Edward J. Barrett
Democratic
Elected Secretary of State
Edward J. Barrett
Democratic

The Secretary of State Edward J. Barrett, a Democrat, was reelected to a second term.

==== Democratic primary ====
Secretary of State Democratic primary
Party	Candidate	Votes	%
Democratic	Edward J. Barrett (incumbent)	591,821	100
Total votes		591,821	100

==== Republican primary ====
Former Illinois Treasurer and incumbent congressman William Stratton won the Republican primary, running unopposed.

Secretary of State Republican primary
Party	Candidate	Votes	%
Republican	William G. Stratton	713,430	100
Write-in	Others	2	0.00
Total votes		713,432	

==== General election ====
Secretary of State election
Party	Candidate	Votes	%
Democratic	Edward J. Barrett (incumbent)	2,120,832	54.49
Republican	William G. Stratton	1,759,083	45.19
Prohibition	Maude Swits Stowell	9,636	0.25
Socialist Labor	Gregory P. Lyngas	2,896	0.07
Write-in	Others	6	0.07
Total votes		3,892,453	100

=== Auditor of Public Accounts ===
1948 Illinois Auditor of Public Accounts election
- November 2, 1948
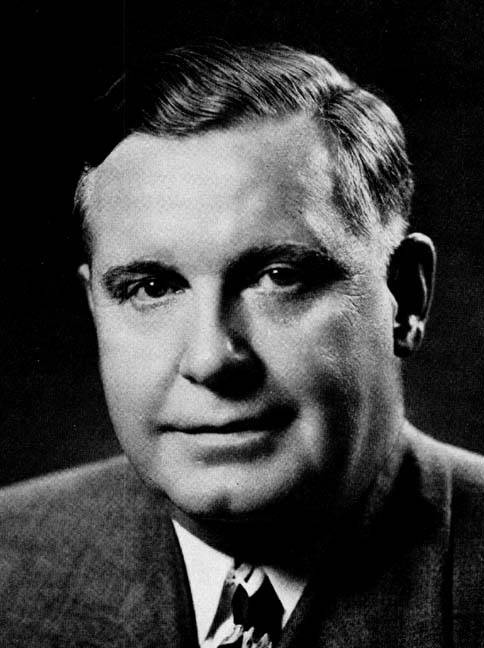

Nominee	Benjamin O. Cooper	Sinon A. Murray
Party	Democratic	Republican
Popular vote	2,030,222	1,776,396
Percentage	53.15%	46.51%
Auditor of Public Accounts before election
Arthur C. Lueder
Republican
Elected Auditor of Public Accounts
Benjamin O. Cooper
Democratic

Incumbent Auditor of Public Accounts Arthur C. Lueder, a Republican, did not seek reelection to a third term. Democrat Benjamin O. Cooper was elected to succeed him in office.

==== Democratic primary ====
Auditor of Public Accounts Democratic primary
Party	Candidate	Votes	%
Democratic	Benjamin O. Cooper	543,319	100
Total votes		543,319	100

==== Republican primary ====
Auditor of Public Accounts Republican primary
Party	Candidate	Votes	%
Republican	Sinon A. Murray	648,460	100
Write-in	Others	2	0.00
Total votes		648,462	100

==== General election ====
Auditor of Public Accounts election
Party	Candidate	Votes	%
Democratic	Benjamin O. Cooper	2,030,222	53.15
Republican	Sinon A. Murray	1,776,396	46.51
Prohibition	Irving B. Gilbert	10,156	0.27
Socialist Labor	Nick Mays	2,960	0.08
Write-in	Others	2	0.0
Total votes		3,819,736	100

=== Treasurer ===
1948 Illinois State Treasurer election
- November 2, 1948
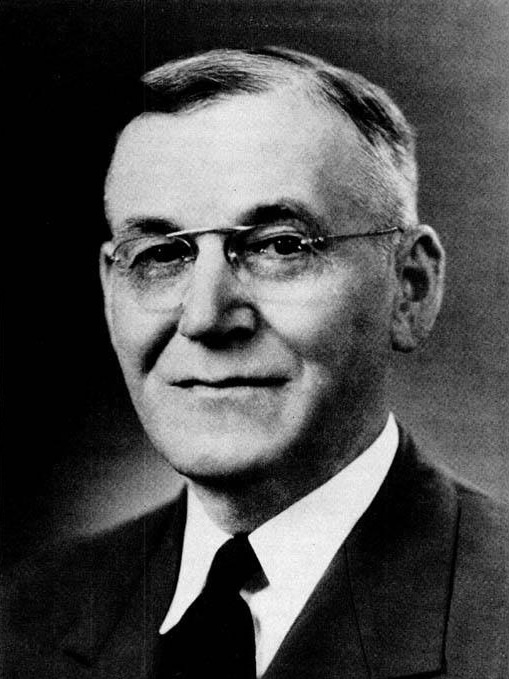

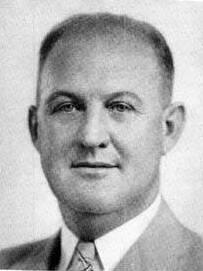
Nominee	Ora Smith	Elmer Droste
Party	Democratic	Republican
Popular vote	2,026,268	1,769,775
Percentage	53.20%	46.46%
- County results Smith: 40–50% 50–60% 60–70% Droste: 40–50% 50–60% 60–70% 70–80%
Treasurer before election
Richard Yates Rowe
Republican
Elected Treasurer
Ora Smith
Democratic

Incumbent first-term Treasurer Richard Yates Rowe, a Republican, did not seek reelection, instead opting to run for lieutenant governor. Democrat Ora Smith was elected to succeed him in office.

==== Democratic primary ====
Treasurer Democratic primary
Party	Candidate	Votes	%
Democratic	Ora Smith	541,808	100
Total votes		541,808	100

==== Republican primary ====
Treasurer Republican primary
Party	Candidate	Votes	%
Republican	Elmer H. Droste	644,417	100
Total votes		644,417	

==== General election ====
Treasurer election
Party	Candidate	Votes	%
Democratic	Ora Smith	2,026,268	53.20
Republican	Elmer H. Droste	1,769,775	46.46
Prohibition	Rupert J. Jordan	10,043	0.26
Socialist Labor	Rudolph Kosie	3,024	0.08
Write-in	Others	3	0.0
Total votes		3,809,113	100

=== State Senate ===
Seats of the Illinois Senate were up for election in 1948. Republicans retained control of the chamber.

=== State House of Representatives ===
Seats in the Illinois House of Representatives were up for election in 1948. Democrats flipped control of the chamber.

=== Trustees of University of Illinois ===
1948 Trustees of University of Illinois election
- November 2, 1948

An election was held for three of the nine seats for Trustees of University of Illinois. All three Democratic nominees won. The election was for six-year terms.

4,078,146 ballots were cast in the election.

All three who were elected had never before held office as Trustees of the University of Illinois. Incumbent Republican Chester R. Davis lost reelection. Fellow Republican incumbents Martin Gerard Luken Sr. and Frank Hotchkiss McKelvey were not nominated for what would have been a second term.

Trustees of the University of Illinois election
Party	Candidate	Votes	%
Democratic	Robert Z. Hickman	1,952,705½	17.25
Democratic	Frances Best Watkins	1,933,764½	16.95
Democratic	George Wirt Herrick	1,918,521	16.95
Republican	Chester R. Davis (incumbent)	1,860,339	16.43
Republican	Dr. W. L. Crawford	1,837,011	16.23
Republican	Charles L. Engstrom	1,781,733½	15.74
Prohibition	E.N. Himmel	11,417½	0.10
Prohibition	Regina Ethel Ruyle	10,988	0.10
Prohibition	Ross E. Price	10,890½	0.10
Socialist Labor	Loren M. Johnson	3,332	0.03
Socialist Labor	Bernard Campbell	3,222	0.03
Socialist Labor	Henry Cortez	3,139	0.03
Write-in	Others	2	0.00
Total votes		11,321,024½	100

=== Judicial elections ===
1948 Illinois judicial elections

Special judicial elections were held to fill vacancies.

==== Circuit Courts ====
===== Tenth Judicial Circuit (vacancy caused by resignation of Joseph E. Daily) =====
Tenth Judicial Circuit (vacancy caused by resignation of Joseph E. Daily)
Party	Candidate	Votes	%
Republican	Howard White	52,182	52.06
Democratic	Baird V. Helfrich	48,062	47.95
Total votes		100,244	100

===== Thirteenth Judicial Circuit (vacancy caused by death of Frank H. Hayes) =====
This election was held on November 2, 1948.

Thirteenth Judicial Circuit (vacancy caused by death of Frank H. Hayes)
Party	Candidate	Votes	%
Democratic	Robert E. Larkin	37,341	53.76
Republican	S J Holderman	32,118	46.24
Total votes		69,459	100

== Local elections ==
Local elections were held.
