= Elmer Droste =

American lawyer, politician, and Army officer

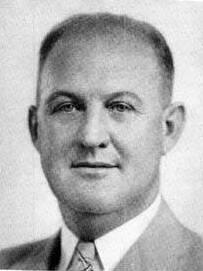
Official portrait, 1941

Elmer Herman Droste (June 16, 1895 – April 23, 1972) was an American lawyer, politician, and Army officer.

Elmer H. Droste was born in 1895 in Mount Olive, Illinois, one of thirteen children of Herman and Louise (Niemann) Droste. He graduated from Mount Olive High School, and in 1922 he graduated from St. Louis University. In 1925 he married Beatrice Brown and had two sons, John and Robert. Droste was admitted to the Illinois and Missouri bars. He was a lawyer practicing in Mt. Olive, with his son Robert L. Droste.

Droste served in the United States Army during both World War I and World War II. He was commissioned a full colonel and was the recipient of the silver star and the bronze star for his military service in command of Division Trains for the 6th Armored Division under General George Patton. He was elected as a member of the Illinois State Senate in 1940 and served until 1942, when he resigned his seat to rejoin the United States Army upon America's entry in World War II.

Droste served on the Mount Olive School Board. He died in 1972 at St. Mary's Hospital in Clayton, Missouri.

== Notes ==
Party political offices
Preceded by Richard Yates Rowe	Republican nominee for Illinois Treasurer; 1948	Succeeded by William Stratton
