= Thomas Giarrante =

American politician

Mayor of Joliet, Illinois
- In office 2011–2015
- Preceded by: Arthur Schultz
- Succeeded by: Bob O'Dekirk

Personal details
- Born: Joliet, Illinois
- Spouse: Rosemary
- Children: 3
- Education: Joliet Junior College
- Occupation: Barber, retired firefighter

Thomas Giarrante is a former mayor of Joliet, Illinois. Giarrante won the April 2011 election by receiving 26% of the mayoral votes in a field of nine candidates. He replaced outgoing Mayor Arthur Schultz. Giarrante was defeated for re-election as mayor by Bob O'Dekirk on April 7, 2015.

Giarrante is a lifelong Joliet resident who attended Sacred Heart Grade School, Joliet Catholic High School, and Joliet Junior College. He spent 22 years as a firefighter, serving as president of the Joliet Firefighters Local 44 for 16 years. Giarrante has served on the Joliet Park Board and the Joliet Public Service Committee. Prior to becoming mayor, Giarrante served for 15 years on the Joliet City Council. He has chaired the Joliet City Council Public Safety Committee, Water Park Committee and the Baseball Committee.

Giarrante has a wife, Rosemary, and three children, six grandchildren and one great-grandchild.

== See also ==
- List of mayors of Joliet, Illinois
