= John Edward Cassidy =

American lawyer

John E. Cassidy
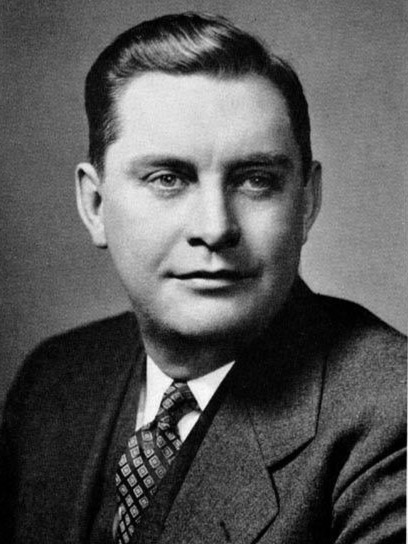

Attorney General of Illinois
- In office 1938–1941
- Governor: Henry Horner; John Henry Stelle
- Preceded by: Otto Kerner Sr.
- Succeeded by: George F. Barrett

Personal details
- Born: January 31, 1896 Ottawa, Illinois
- Died: March 25, 1984 (aged 88) Peoria, Illinois
- Party: Democratic
- Children: John E. Cassidy Jr

John Edward Cassidy, Sr. (January 31, 1896 – March 25, 1984) was an American lawyer.

Born in Ottawa, Illinois, Cassidy received his law degree from the University of Notre Dame in 1917 and was admitted to the Illinois bar the same year. Cassidy served in the United States Army in Europe during World War I. In 1920, Cassidy moved to Peoria, Illinois to head the legal department of Aetna Life Insurance Company. In 1921, he set up his own law firm in Peoria. Cassidy was involved with the Democratic Party. In 1936, he ran unsuccessfully for the party's nomination for lieutenant governor of Illinois. Cassidy was appointed Illinois Attorney General in 1938 and served until 1941. In 1947, Illinois Governor Dwight Green appointed Cassidy to be chairman of a citizens committee to investigate the March 25, 1947 mine disaster in Centralia, Illinois. Cassidy died in a hospital in Peoria, Illinois.

== Notes ==
Legal offices
Preceded by Otto Kerner, Sr.	Attorney General of Illinois; 1938 – 1941	Succeeded by George F. Barrett
