= Arthur Schultz =

American politician (1933–2011)

Mayor of Joliet, Illinois
- In office 1991–2011
- Preceded by: Charles Connor
- Succeeded by: Thomas Giarrante

Personal details
- Born: July 4, 1933 Joliet, Illinois
- Died: November 26, 2011 (aged 78) Joliet, Illinois
- Party: Republican
- Spouse: Frances Jacksa
- Children: 5
- Education: Joliet Catholic High School
- Occupation: Police officer, politician

Military service
- Branch/service: United States Navy
- Years of service: 1950–1954
- Unit: Submarine

Arthur Schultz (July 4, 1933 – November 26, 2011) was an American Republican politician. He was a five-term mayor of Joliet, Illinois, the then fourth largest (now 3rd largest) municipality in the state after Chicago, Aurora, and Rockford. He was last elected in April 2007. Prior to his first election, he served in the United States Navy and in the Joliet Police Department.

He finished as the first runner-up in the Joliet City Council election of 1989, but when a sitting councilwoman died a few months after the election he was passed over several times for the nomination. This was controversial as the nomination is customarily given to the runner-up in the most recent election. He returned to elective politics to defeat the mayor, who did not nominate him in the subsequent election in 1991.

In his time in office, Joliet changed from an economy of a prison town with declining population to a fast-growing entertainment and tourism economy, focused on riverboat casinos. Residential and commercial construction increased and racing tracks, a baseball stadium, and several civic works developed as a result of the booming economy.

== Personal life ==
Schultz was born on July 4, 1933 and raised in Joliet. He attended parochial schools in the city, and was an altar boy. Schultz was a graduate of Joliet Catholic High School. After high school, he served four years in the United States Navy during the Korean War. He then worked for the Joliet Police Department for 29 years before being elected mayor in 1991.

Schultz and his wife were married on November 6, 1954, at the Cathedral of St. Raymond in Joliet. As of his 50th wedding anniversary in 2004, Schultz had five children and eight grandchildren.

On November 16, 1993, Schultz had a laryngectomy after having had vocal cord tumors removed the previous May. He lost his voice for a period before regaining it after several months of home recuperation with the aid of a voice prosthesis that was inserted into a neck valve. Schultz suffered congestive heart failure on November 14, 2011, which required hospital care. He died on November 26, 2011, aged 78.

== Political career ==
=== Election history ===
==== City Council ====
Schultz ran for the election to the Joliet City Council in the spring 1989 municipal elections. He advanced from the February 28, 1989 primary election to the general election in what the Chicago Tribune described as a surprisingly strong showing, but finished fourth in the six-way April 4 general election for three seats.

In August 1989, Joliet Councilwoman Margaret Short died with two years remaining in her term and Joliet Mayor Charles Connor had the responsibility of nominating a replacement for consideration by the remaining councilmen. Rather than following the custom of nominating the first runner-up in the most recent council election (Schultz in this case), Connor nominated a political ally. The council did not support the nomination and after some delay she withdrew on September 19. When Connor's second nomination was again not one of the runners-up, it was again defeated, which led to the council enacting legislation to strip the mayor of his power to nominate councilmen. On October 17, Connor became the first Joliet mayor since the mid-1970s to refuse to sign legislation passed by the Joliet City Council. On November 21, there was unanimous agreement on a compromise candidate who was also not one of the runners-up.

==== Mayor ====
At the time of the non-partisan February 26, 1991, mayoral primary election, the Chicago Tribune described Joliet as suffering from a stagnant economy and sagging population. Between 1980 and 1990 the population had declined to 76,836 from 77,956, according to the United States Census Bureau. Connor was challenged by three candidates, including Schultz. Schultz narrowly won the primary election by a 2,709–2,545 (38%–36%) margin over Connor, but both candidates advanced to the April general election since they finished first and second in the primary. On April 2, Schultz defeated Connor by a 6,081–5,534 margin.

Schultz was approved in his re-election bids. In 1995, he earned 67 percent of the vote in the primary election and 68 percent in the general election. He was unopposed in 1999. In 2003, he became the first four-term mayor for Joliet, which was incorporated in 1852, by taking 83% of the vote in a four-way contest. In 2007, he earned 73% of the vote in a three-way contest. He did not run in the 2011 election, and was succeeded by Thomas Giarrante.

=== Service ===
In January 1990, the Illinois legislature passed two bills that permitted gambling along the Mississippi, Illinois, and Des Plaines Rivers. but gambling did not commence in Joliet until June 17, 1992. In January 1993 Schultz described Joliet as "the riverboat-gambling capital of the world". In 1995 Joliet officials expected the town to be debt free by 2001 with Schultz described the sizable gambling industry revenues as "manna from Heaven" and encouraged other cities to try legalized gambling. Between 1993 and 1997 Schultz received US$1,500 in gambling-related political contributions.

During the 1990s, Joliet was one of the fastest-growing cities in the state, and in 2000 its residential and commercial construction were at record-setting levels, according to Schultz. Schultz also credited gambling revenues with having enabled the city to halt tax increases for a decade and to build a new police station and three new firehouses. In 1999, the Joliet City Council approved the construction of the Chicagoland Speedway on 930 acres (3.76 km^{2}) of land next to the Route 66 Raceway. Between 2000 and 2002 Joliet was the tenth fastest-growing city in the United States. Under Schultz, the city ended nearly 150 years as a prison town with the closure of the Joliet Correctional Center and focused its economy on entertainment and tourism.

In the early 1990s the city annexed 55 acres (0.22 km^{2}) for the construction of the Empress Riverboat Casino complex. In 1999, the city annexed 923 acres (3.74 km^{2}) for the construction of the Chicagoland Speedway, which when combined with the Route 66 Raceway made Joliet the only racing facility host in the United States capable of hosting races from each major category in professional auto racing. In 2001, the city acquired 12 parcels totaling 8 acres (32,000 m^{2}) through expedited condemnations to build Silver Cross Field. In 2005, the city annexed 988 acres (4.00 km^{2}) to provide a corridor for commercial and residential growth. As of the July 1, 2007 United States Census Bureau population estimates, Joliet had a population of 144,316. Thus, Schultz served as mayor for a city that ranked as the 162nd largest incorporated municipality in the United States and the fourth largest in the state of Illinois.

Silver Cross Field, which was built in 2002 to host the Joliet Jackhammers of the Northern League is located at 1 Mayor Art Schultz Drive. By 2007, prospects of continued growth necessitated that Joliet agree on borders with the neighboring municipality of Oswego and that it consider future borders with others.

== See also ==
- List of mayors of Joliet, Illinois
