= Stanley C. Armstrong =

American politician and lawyer (1888–1950)

Stanley C. Armstrong (February 22, 1888 – July 12, 1950) was an American politician and lawyer.

Armstrong was born in Steuben County, New York. He graduated from Savona High School in Savona, New York, and from Cook Academy in Montour Falls, New York. In 1907, Armstrong moved to Chicago, Illinois. He graduated from Chicago–Kent College of Law in 1911 and was admitted to the Illinois bar. Armstrong lived and practiced law in Chicago. He was a Republican and was the nephew of Edward J. Brundage who served as Illinois Attorney General. Armstrong served in the Illinois House of Representatives from 1943 until his death in 1950. Armstrong died from a heart attack while eating at a restaurant in Chicago, Illinois.
