= Ivan A. Elliott =

American lawyer and politician

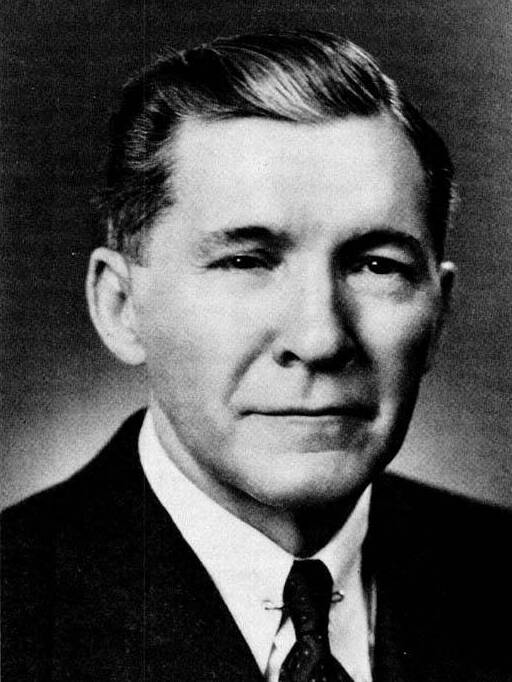
official portrait, 1949

Ivan Arvel Elliott, Sr. (November 18, 1889 – April 13, 1990) was an American lawyer. Born in White County, Illinois, Elliott received his bachelor's degree from University of Illinois and his law degree from Illinois Wesleyan University. He served in the United States Army during World War I and World War II. Elliott was a Democrat. He practiced law in Carmi, Illinois, served as the Carmi City Attorney and served as President of the Carmi School Board. From 1937 to 1942, Elliott served as State's Attorney of White County, Illinois. From 1949 to 1953, Elliott served as Illinois Attorney General. In 1952, he was defeated for re-election.

== Notes ==
Party political offices
Preceded by Sveinbjorn Johnson	Democratic nominee for Attorney General of Illinois; 1948, 1952	Succeeded by James L. O'Keefe
Legal offices
Preceded by George F. Barrett	Attorney General of Illinois; 1949–1953	Succeeded by Latham Castle
