= James K. Edsall =

American politician (1831–1892)

- Born: May 10, 1831; Windham (town), New York
- Died: June 19, 1892 (aged 61); Chicago, Illinois
- Occupations: Lawyer and politician

James Kirtland Edsall (May 10, 1831 – June 19, 1892) was an American lawyer and politician.

Born in Windham, Greene County, New York, Edsall studied law and was admitted to the New York bar in 1852. He practiced law in Plattsburgh, New York, Milwaukee, Wisconsin, and St. Paul, Minnesota. In 1854, Edsall moved to Leavenworth, Kansas Territory and practiced law; he served in the Kansas Constitutional Convention during the Bleeding Kansas conflict and was part of the Topeka Free Soil group. In 1857, Edsall moved to Dixon, Illinois and continued to practice law. In 1864, he was elected mayor of Dixon. In 1871, Edsall served in the Illinois State Senate and was a Republican. From 1873 to 1881, Edsall served as Illinois Attorney General. In 1878, he moved to Chicago, Illinois and continue to practice law after he left office in 1881. Edsall died of heart failure at his home in Chicago, Illinois. His son was Samuel Cook Edsall who served as bishop of the Episcopal Diocese of Minnesota.

== Notes ==
Party political offices
Preceded by Washington Bushnell	Republican nominee for Attorney General of Illinois; 1872, 1876	Succeeded by James A. McCartney
Legal offices
Preceded by Washington Bushnell	Attorney General of Illinois; 1873 – 1881	Succeeded by James A. McCartney
