= Maurice T. Moloney =

American politician (1849–1917)

21st Attorney General of Illinois
- In office 1893–1897
- Preceded by: George Hunt
- Succeeded by: Edward C. Akin

Personal details
- Born: July 26, 1849 County Kerry, Ireland
- Died: March 9, 1917 (aged 67) Ottawa, Illinois, U.S.
- Party: Democratic
- Education: University of Virginia
- Occupation: Politician, lawyer

Maurice T. Moloney (July 26, 1849 – March 9, 1917) was an American lawyer.

Born in County Kerry, Ireland, Moloney emigrated to the United States in 1867. He studied at the Roman Catholic Seminary of Our Lady of Angels at Niagara Falls, New York and then studied theology in Latrobe, Pennsylvania and Wheeling, West Virginia. Moloney then studied law at the University of Virginia School of Law and graduated in 1871. He then moved to Ottawa, Illinois, and was admitted to the Illinois bar. Moloney practiced law in Ottawa, Illinois and served as city attorney. From 1884 to 1888, Moloney served as state's attorney for LaSalle County, Illinois and was a Democrat. Moloney served as Illinois Attorney General from 1893 to 1897. In 1899, Moloney was elected mayor of Ottawa, Illinois. Moloney died suddenly at his home in Ottawa, Illinois.

== Notes ==
Party political offices
Preceded by Jacob R. Creighton	Democratic nominee for Attorney General of Illinois; 1892	Succeeded by George Arthur Trude
Legal offices
Preceded by George Hunt	Attorney General of Illinois; 1893 – 1897	Succeeded by Edward C. Akin
