= James A. McCartney =

US politician

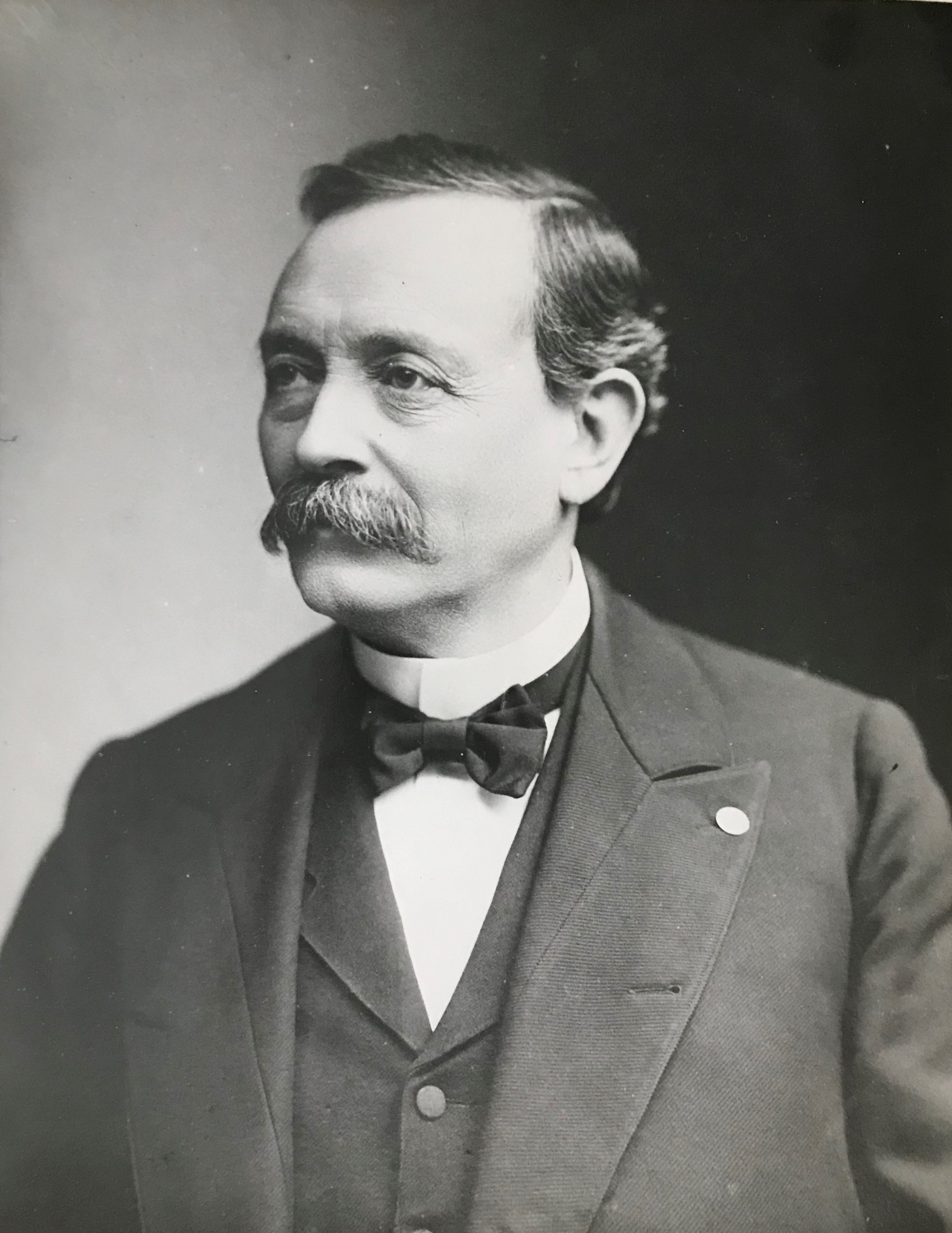

19th Attorney General of Illinois
- In office 1881–1885
- Governor: Shelby Moore Cullom, John Marshall Hamilton
- Preceded by: James K. Edsall
- Succeeded by: George Hunt

Personal details
- Born: February 14, 1835 Ireland
- Died: May 13, 1911 (aged 76) Sherman, Texas, U.S.
- Resting place: Forest Home Cemetery
- Party: Republican
- Spouse: Eunice Lindsley
- Children: 3

Military service
- Branch/service: Union Army
- Years of service: 1861-1862 1862-1865
- Rank: Captain
- Unit: 17th Illinois Infantry Regiment 112th Illinois Infantry Regiment
- Battles/wars: American Civil War: Battle of Fort Donelson

James A. McCartney (1835–1911) was an American lawyer and politician who served as the 19th Attorney General of Illinois from 1881 to 1885.

== Early life ==
He was born on February 14, 1835, in Ireland. His family emigrated to the United States when he was two years old and lived in Lawrence County, Pennsylvania until 1845. His parents then moved to Trumbull County, Ohio, where he and his father engaged in farming. In the winter months he went to school and advanced rapidly in his studies. He became a student at the Western Reserve Seminary in Farmington, Ohio.

== Legal practice ==
In 1856, McCartney began to study law in Warren, Ohio in the office of Hon. Matthew Birchard. In 1857 he went into the office of Harding & Reed in Monmouth, Illinois, where he finished reading and was admitted to the bar in 1858. McCartney moved to Galva, Illinois in 1859 and practiced law there until the Civil War broke out.

== Military service ==
McCartney served in the American Civil War from 1861-1865. In April 1861 he enlisted in a company raised at Galva as a First Lieutenant. The company was mustered into service as Company D, 17th Illinois Infantry. He served with the 17th until after the Battle of Fort Donelson in February 1862. He was compelled to resign his commission in March due to health failing from exposure.

After recovering his health with a visit to Lake Superior, he again entered the service in October 1862 as First Lieutenant in Company G, 112th Illinois Infantry, commanded by Col. Thomas J. Henderson. He was promoted to Captain in April 1863, and served throughout the war, mostly in Kentucky and Tennessee. McCartney mustered out with the regiment at Camp Douglas in July 1865.

Throughout the war, McCartney wrote many letters to his wife Eunice, detailing his experiences in battle. They are housed in the Wayne County Historical Society in Fairfield, Illinois. A series of twenty-two columns about his life gleaned from those letters was written by Wasson Lawrence and appeared in the Wayne County Press in the 1960s.

== After the war ==
After the war, McCartney returned to the practice of law, this time in Fairfield, Illinois. He became prominent in Southern Illinois for his legal work. It is in Fairfield that he began to get involved in local and state politics.

== Attorney General of Illinois ==
McCartney was elected to the post of Attorney General as a Republican in 1880, and served from 1881-1885. During his term as the Attorney General, he worked to institute the Chicago Lake Front suits, culminating in the court case Illinois Central Railroad Co. v. Illinois. This case helped preserve the Chicago lakefront at Grant Park in public trust.

== Later life ==
After serving as Attorney General, McCartney continued to practice law in Springfield, Illinois. In 1890, he moved to Chicago where he continued to practice law. He was elected to the Congress of Chicago district and served as attorney for the Lincoln Park board.

== Death ==
James A. McCartney died on May 13, 1911, in a sanitarium in Sherman, Texas. He was buried at Forest Home Cemetery in Chicago.

Party political offices
Preceded by James K. Edsall	Republican nominee for Attorney General of Illinois; 1880	Succeeded by George Hunt
Legal offices
Preceded by James K. Edsall	Attorney General of Illinois; 1881 – 1885	Succeeded by George Hunt
