= Benjamin F. Marsh =

American politician (1835–1905)

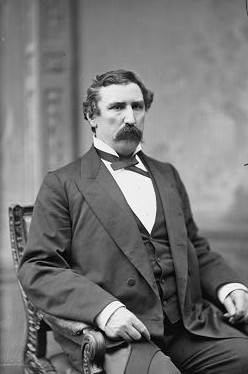
- Marsh, 1865–1880

Member of the U.S. House of Representatives from Illinois
- In office March 4, 1877 – March 3, 1883
- Preceded by: John C. Bagby
- Succeeded by: Nicholas E. Worthington
- Constituency: 10th district
- In office March 4, 1893 – March 3, 1901
- Preceded by: Benjamin T. Cable (11th); Joseph G. Cannon (15th)
- Succeeded by: Walter Reeves (11th); J. Ross Mickey (15th)
- Constituency: 11th district (1893-95); 15th district (1895-1901)
- In office March 4, 1903 – June 2, 1905
- Preceded by: Joseph V. Graff
- Succeeded by: James McKinney
- Constituency: 14th district

Personal details
- Born: Benjamin Franklin Marsh; November 19, 1835 Warsaw, Illinois, U.S.
- Died: June 2, 1905 (aged 69) Warsaw, Illinois, U.S.
- Party: Republican

Benjamin Franklin Marsh (November 19, 1835 – June 2, 1905) was a U.S. representative from Illinois in the late 19th century to early 20th century. He was also a lawyer, soldier, agriculture manager, stock raiser, and Illinois state railroad and warehouse commissioner.

== Early life ==
Benjamin Marsh was born in 1835 in Warsaw, Illinois (Hancock County). He first studied law in Warsaw, and after attending law school was admitted to the bar in 1860. He continued to study law after the American Civil War until 1877, when he was elected Illinois State Representative.

== Civil War ==
Benjamin enlisted into the 16th Illinois Infantry Regiment as a private. He was later commissioned as a colonel. Benjamin received the Purple Heart when he received a piece of shrapnel in the foot. He participated in battles such as Shiloh and Antietam. Marsh "served continuously until January, 1866, having campaigned in every seceding state except Virginia and the two Carolinas; he received four gunshot wounds and carries in his body rebel lead". After the war ended he continued his law practices until 1877.

== Government office ==
Benjamin Marsh first started his way into the Illinois Government office by becoming the Republican candidate for membership of the Illinois State Constitutional Convention.

In 1876 he was elected as a Republican to the 45th United States Congress, and served through the 46th and 47th Congresses. (March 4, 1877 – March 3, 1883)

In the 47th Congress, Marsh served as chairman of the Committee on Pensions. He failed to get reelected in 1882 to the 48th Congress.

IN 1888 Marsh was delegate to the Republican National Convention. In 1892 he was elected to the 53rd United States Congress. He served through the 54th, 55th, and 56th Congresses, serving from March 4, 1893 to March 3, 1901. Starting with the 54th Congress in 1894, he became chairman on the Committee of the Militia, on which he served through the 56th Congress.

Marsh then ran unsuccessfully for re-election to the 57th Congress, but was successful when he ran for election to the 58th and 59th, in which he served until his death.

== Jobs ==
- U.S. Representative (1877–1883) (1893–1901) (1903–1905)
- Lawyer
- Agricultural Manager
- 1889 State Railroad and Warehouse Commissioner
- Delegate to the Republican National Convention

== Death ==
Marsh died in office in 1905. He is buried at Oakland Cemetery in Warsaw, Illinois.

== See also ==
- List of members of the United States Congress who died in office (1900–1949)

U.S. House of Representatives
Preceded by John C. Bagby	Member of the U.S. House of Representatives from Illinois's 10th congressional district 1877–1883	Succeeded by Nicholas E. Worthington
Preceded by Benjamin Cable	Member of the U.S. House of Representatives from Illinois's 11th congressional district 1893–1895	Succeeded by Walter Reeves
Preceded by Joseph G. Cannon	Member of the U.S. House of Representatives from Illinois's 15th congressional district 1895–1901	Succeeded by J. Ross Mickey
Preceded by Joseph V. Graff	Member of the U.S. House of Representatives from Illinois's 14th congressional district 1903–1905	Succeeded by James McKinney
