= J. Ross Mickey =

American politician

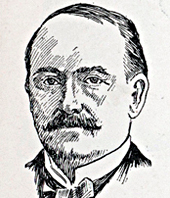

Member of the U.S. House of Representatives from Illinois's 15th district
- In office March 4, 1901 – March 3, 1903
- Preceded by: Benjamin F. Marsh
- Succeeded by: George W. Prince

Personal details
- Born: January 5, 1856 Eldorado Township, Illinois, U.S.
- Died: March 20, 1928 (aged 72) Excelsior Springs, Missouri, U.S.
- Party: Democratic

J. Ross Mickey (January 5, 1856 – March 20, 1928) was a U.S. Representative from Illinois.

Born on a farm in Eldorado Township, McDonough County, Illinois, Mickey attended the public schools and Lincoln (Illinois) College. He taught in the public schools of Macomb, McDonough County, Illinois, for a number of years. He studied law. He was admitted to the bar in 1889 and practiced in Macomb, Illinois, until 1898.

Mickey was elected judge of McDonough County in 1898 for a term of four years, but resigned February 22, 1901, having been elected to Congress.

Mickey was elected as a Democrat to the Fifty-seventh Congress (March 4, 1901 – March 3, 1903). He declined to be a candidate for renomination in 1902. He resumed the practice of law in Macomb, Illinois. He served as president of the Mystic Workers of the World 1908-1918 and as a director from 1918 until his death. He died in Excelsior Springs, Missouri, on March 20, 1928. He was interred in Oakwood Cemetery, Macomb, Illinois.

U.S. House of Representatives
Preceded by Benjamin F. Marsh	Member of the U.S. House of Representatives from Illinois's 15th congressional district 1901-1903	Succeeded by George W. Prince
