= Oscar E. Carlstrom =

American lawyer (1878–1948)

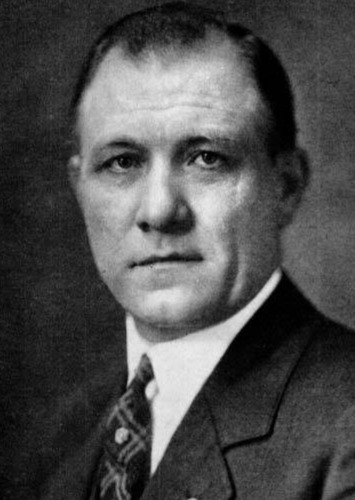
- Carlstrom in 1925

27th Attorney General of Illinois
- In office 1925–1933
- Preceded by: Edward J. Brundage
- Succeeded by: Otto Kerner Sr.

Personal details
- Born: July 16, 1878; Aledo, Illinois, U.S.
- Died: March 6, 1948 (aged 69); Aledo, Illinois, U.S.
- Occupation: Lawyer

Oscar E. Carlstrom (July 16, 1878 – March 6, 1948) was an American lawyer.

== Early life ==
Carlstrom was born on a farm near Aledo, Illinois and graduated from New Boston High School. He attended a law course at Northern Illinois College of Law in Dixon, Illinois.

== Military career ==
As a member of the United States Volunteers, he joined the 39th Volunteer Infantry from August 26, 1899, to May 6, 1901, and was stationed in the Philippines for 16 months. He also served in Illinois Army National Guard with the 6th Illinois Infantry and the 123rd Field Artillery Regiment from November 26, 1916, to June 7, 1919, during World War I and was stationed in France for one year. He became a captain.

== Political and legal career ==
Carlstrom was admitted to the Illinois Bar in 1903. He served as Aledo City Attorney and as state's attorney for Mercer County, Illinois. Carlstrom served as a delegate to the Illinois Constitutional Convention of 1920 and was a member of the Illinois State Tax Commission from 1921 to 1925. Carlstrom was a Republican. From 1925 to 1933, Carlstrom served as Illinois Attorney General. In 1936, he ran unsuccessfully for the Republican nomination for governor.

== Death ==
Carlstrom died at his home in Aledo, Illinois.

Party political offices
Preceded by Edward J. Brundage	Republican nominee for Attorney General of Illinois; 1924, 1928	Succeeded by John E. Northup
Legal offices
Preceded by Edward J. Brundage	Attorney General of Illinois; 1925 – 1933	Succeeded by Otto Kerner, Sr.
