= Nicholas E. Worthington =

American politician (1836–1916)

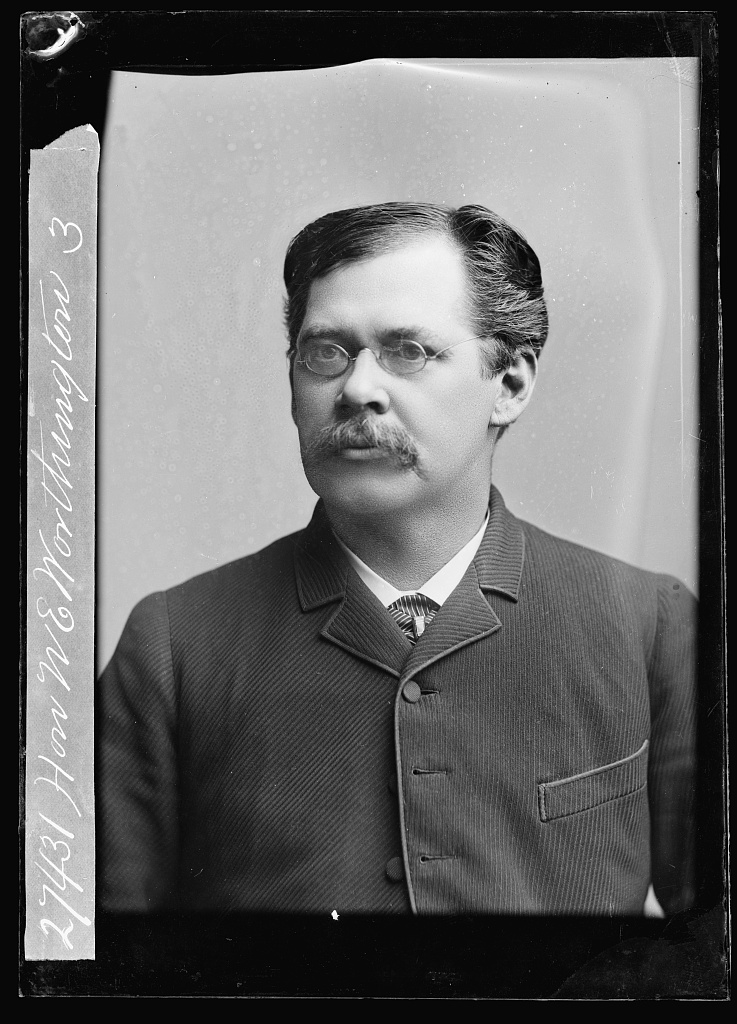
- Worthington, 1873–1890

Member of the U.S. House of Representatives from Illinois's 10th district
- In office March 4, 1883 – March 3, 1887
- Preceded by: Benjamin F. Marsh
- Succeeded by: Philip S. Post

Personal details
- Born: Nicholas Ellsworth Worthington; March 30, 1836 Brooke County, Virginia (now West Virginia), U.S.
- Died: March 4, 1916 (aged 79) Peoria, Illinois, U.S.
- Party: Democratic

Nicholas Ellsworth Worthington (March 30, 1836 – March 4, 1916) was a U.S. representative from Illinois.

Born in Brooke County, Virginia (now West Virginia), Worthington graduated from Allegheny College, Meadville, Pennsylvania. He studied law. He was admitted to the bar in 1860 and commenced practice in Peoria, Illinois. Superintendent of schools of Peoria County 1865-1872. He served as a member of the state board of education 1869-1872.

Worthington was elected as a Democrat to the Forty-eighth and Forty-ninth Congresses (March 4, 1883 – March 3, 1887). He was an unsuccessful candidate for reelection in 1886 to the Fiftieth Congress and for election in 1888 to the Fifty-first Congress. He resumed the practice of law.

Worthington was elected circuit judge of the tenth judicial district of Illinois in 1891. He was reelected in 1897, and served until his retirement on June 15, 1915. He was appointed by President Cleveland a member of the commission to investigate labor strikes in 1894. He died in Peoria, Illinois, March 4, 1916. He was interred in Springdale Cemetery.

U.S. House of Representatives
Preceded by Benjamin F. Marsh	Member of the U.S. House of Representatives from Illinois's 10th congressional district 1883–1887	Succeeded by Philip S. Post
