= Edward J. Brundage =

American politician (1869–1934)

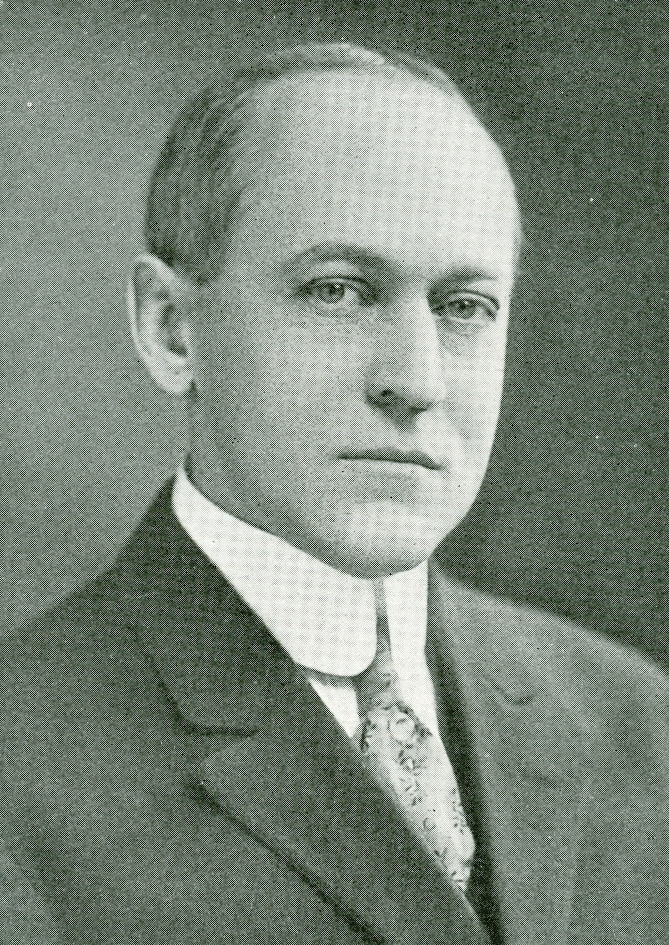
Brundage (1919 or earlier)

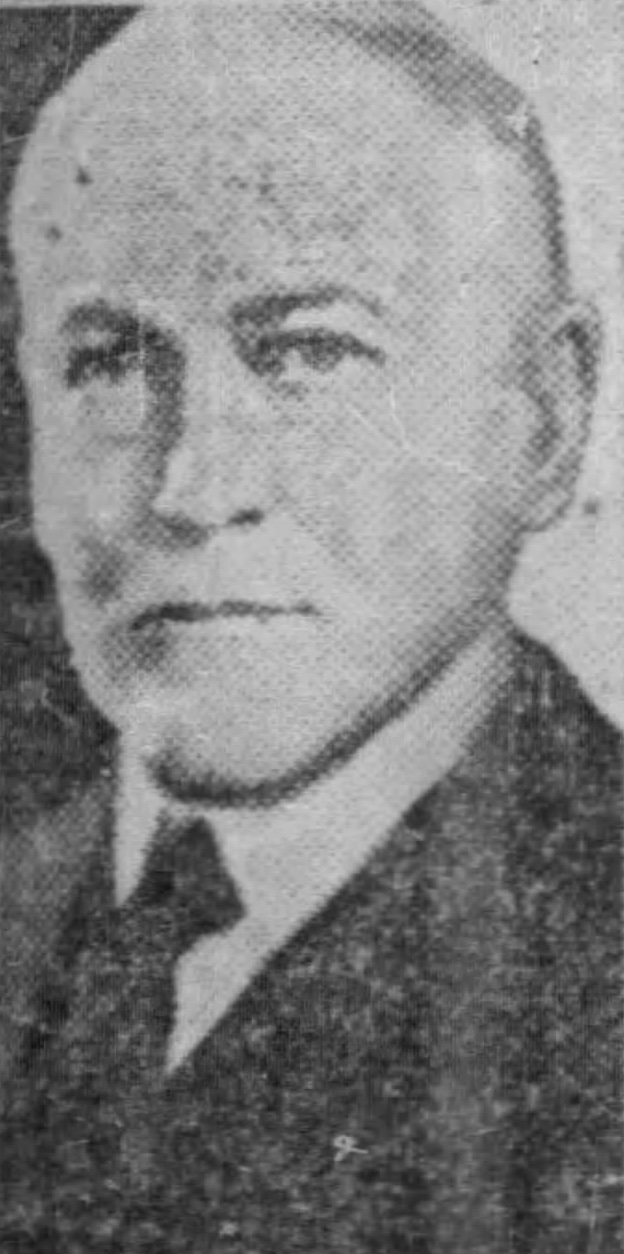
Brundage circa 1927

Edward Jackson Brundage (May 13, 1869 – January 20, 1934) was an American lawyer and politician. Born in Campbell, New York, Brundage moved with his parents to Detroit, Michigan. He worked in a railroad office in Detroit, Michigan, and then moved to Chicago, Illinois, when the general office moved there. Brundage became chief clerk in 1888. He studied law and received his law degree from Chicago-Kent College of Law in 1893.

Brundage served in the Illinois House of Representatives and was a Republican. In November 1904, Brundage was elected President of the Cook County Board of Commissioners and was reelected in 1906. In 1907, Brundage served as corporation counsel for the City of Chicago. From 1917 to 1925, Brundage served as Illinois Attorney General.

Brundage committed suicide at his home in Lake Forest, Illinois, by a self-inflicted gunshot to his heart, motivated to do so by his financial problems. He was buried at Rosehill Cemetery in Chicago.

== Family ==
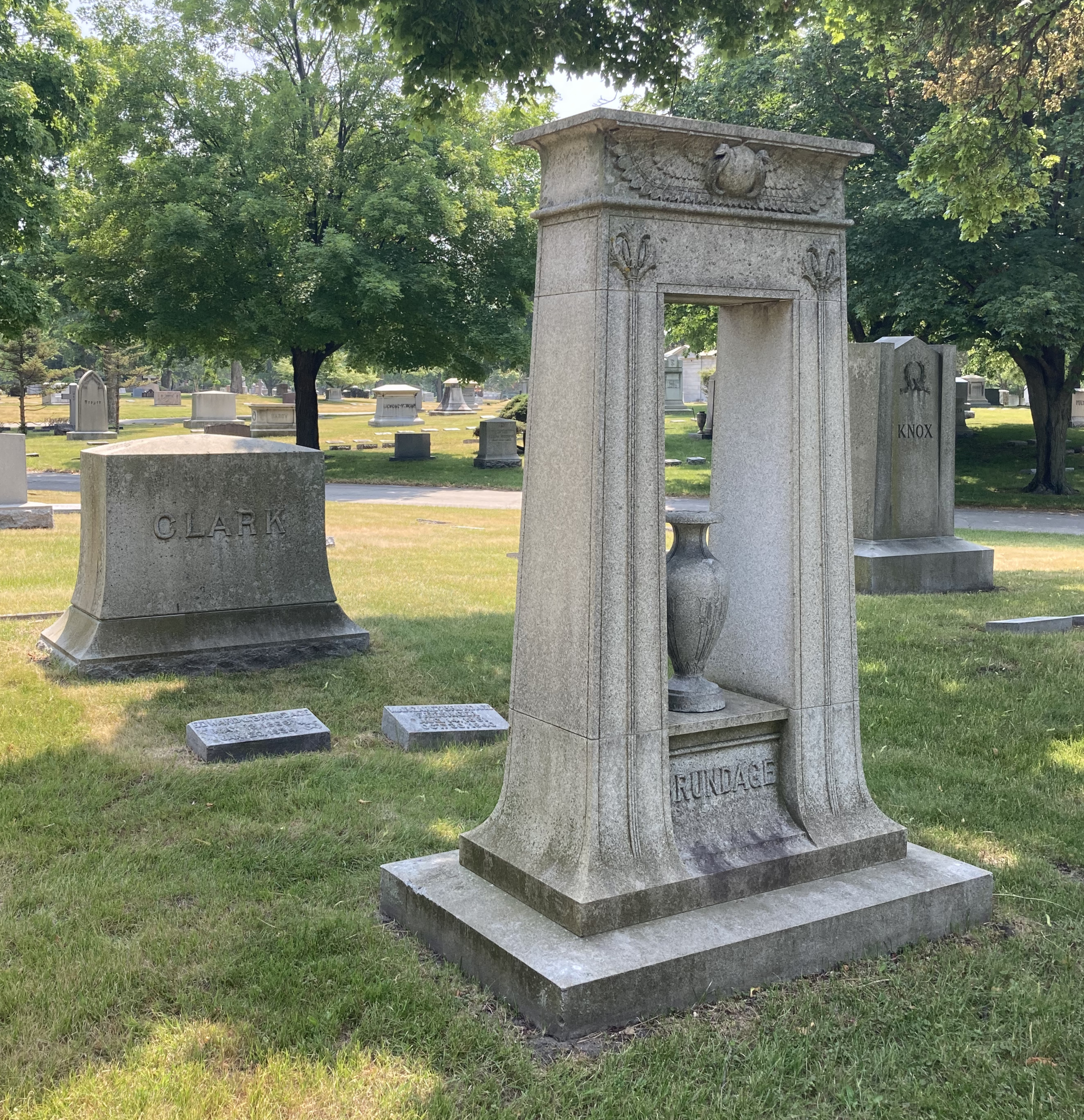
Brundage's grave at Rosehill Cemetery

Edward Brundage was the uncle of Olympic President Avery Brundage. Brundage was also the uncle of Stanley C. Armstrong who also served in the Illinois General Assembly.

== Notes ==
Party political offices
Preceded by William H. Stead	Republican nominee for Attorney General of Illinois; 1916, 1920	Succeeded by Oscar E. Carlstrom
Legal offices
Preceded by Patrick J. Lucey	Attorney General of Illinois; 1917 – 1925	Succeeded by Oscar E. Carlstrom
