= Philip S. Post =

American politician (1833–1895)

Philip Sidney Post
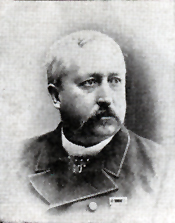
- Born: March 19, 1833; Florida, New York, U.S.
- Died: January 6, 1895 (aged 61); Washington, D.C., U.S.
- Burial place: Hope Cemetery, Galesburg, Illinois
- Military career
- Allegiance: United States of America; Union
- Branch: Union Army
- Service years: 1861–1866
- Rank: Colonel; Brevet Brigadier General
- Commands: 59th Illinois Infantry Regiment; 1st Brigade, 1st Division, XX Corps; 2nd Brigade, 3rd Division, IV Corps
- Conflicts: American Civil War
- Awards: Medal of Honor
- Other work: Lawyer; diplomat; politician

Member of the U.S. House of Representatives from Illinois's 10th district
- In office March 4, 1887 – January 6, 1895
- Preceded by: Nicholas E. Worthington
- Succeeded by: George W. Prince

Philip Sidney Post (March 19, 1833 – January 6, 1895) was an American diplomat, politician, and decorated Army officer. He served as a United States representative from Illinois for eight years, from 1887 to 1895. During the American Civil War, he was a Union Army officer and many years later, Post received the Medal of Honor on March 8, 1893, for his actions at the Battle of Nashville.

== Biography ==
=== Early life ===
Born in Florida, New York, P. Sidney Post pursued classical studies and graduated from Union College, Schenectady, New York, in 1855. He studied at the Poughkeepsie Law School and was admitted to the bar in Illinois in 1856. He then traveled through the northwest and took up his abode in Kansas, where he practiced law and also established and edited a newspaper.

=== Civil War service ===
At the beginning of the American Civil War, he entered the Union Army and served with the 59th Illinois Volunteer Infantry Regiment as a 2nd lieutenant. He was promoted through the ranks to colonel in 1862. He was severely wounded at the Battle of Pea Ridge, and made his way with much suffering, and under many difficulties, to St. Louis, Missouri. Before fully recovering, he joined his regiment in front of Corinth, Mississippi, and was assigned to the command of a brigade.

From May 1862 until the close of the war, he was constantly at the front. In the Army of the Cumberland, as first organized, he commanded the 1st Brigade, 1st Division, of the 20th Army Corps from its formation to its dissolution. He began the Battle of Stones River, drove back the enemy several miles, and captured Leetown. During the Atlanta campaign, he was transferred to Thomas J. Wood's division of the 4th Army Corps, and when that general was wounded at the Battle of Lovejoy's Station, Post took charge of the division, and with it opposed the progress of the Confederates toward the north. On December 16, 1864, in a charge on Overton Hill, during the Battle of Nashville, a grapeshot crushed through his hip, making what was for some days thought to be a mortal wound. (Note: Appleton's Universal Cyclopaedia has the date as November 16, 1864, which is clearly wrong. The Battle of Nashville took place December 15–16, 1864 and Post's charge on Overton Hill and wounding was on December 16. Appleton's also has the date of rank of Post's brevet wrong, although this may be a typographical error that shows December 10 rather than December 16.) On March 11, 1865, President Abraham Lincoln nominated, and the U.S. Senate confirmed, Post for appointment to the brevet grade of brigadier general of volunteers, to rank from December 16, 1864.

After the surrender at Appomattox Court House, he was appointed to the command of the western district of Texas, where there was then a concentration of troops on the Mexican border. He remained there until near the start of 1866 when the withdrawal of the French from Mexico removed all danger of military complications. He was then earnestly recommended by Gen. George H. Thomas and others, under whom he had served, for the appointment of colonel in the regular army. But he did not wish to remain in the army, and he resigned and returned to Illinois. He was mustered out of the volunteers on December 8, 1865.

=== Post war ===
After the war, he was appointed consul to Vienna in 1866, and promoted to consul general to Austria-Hungary in 1874, where he served until his resignation in 1879. He was the commander of the Grand Army of the Republic's Department of Illinois in 1886. He was also a Companion of the Illinois Commandery of the Military Order of the Loyal Legion of the United States.

Post was elected as a Republican to the Fiftieth and to the four succeeding Congresses and served from March 4, 1887, until his death before the close of the Fifty-third Congress, in Washington, D.C., on January 6, 1895. He was an early member of the Sons of the American Revolution.

He was interred in Hope Cemetery, Galesburg, Illinois.

== See also ==
- List of American Civil War brevet generals (Union)
- List of members of the United States Congress who died in office (1790–1899)

== Notes ==
U.S. House of Representatives
Preceded by Nicholas E. Worthington	Member of the U.S. House of Representatives from Illinois's 10th congressional district March 4, 1887 – January 6, 1895	Succeeded by George W. Prince
