= 59th Illinois Infantry Regiment =

- Illinois state flag
- Active: September 18, 1861, to December 8, 1865
- Country: United States
- Allegiance: Union
- Branch: Infantry
- Engagements: Battle of Pea Ridge; Battle of Perryville; Battle of Stone's River; Battle of Lookout Mountain; Battle of Resaca; Battle of Kennesaw Mountain; Siege of Atlanta; Battle of Jonesboro; Battle of Franklin; Battle of Nashville

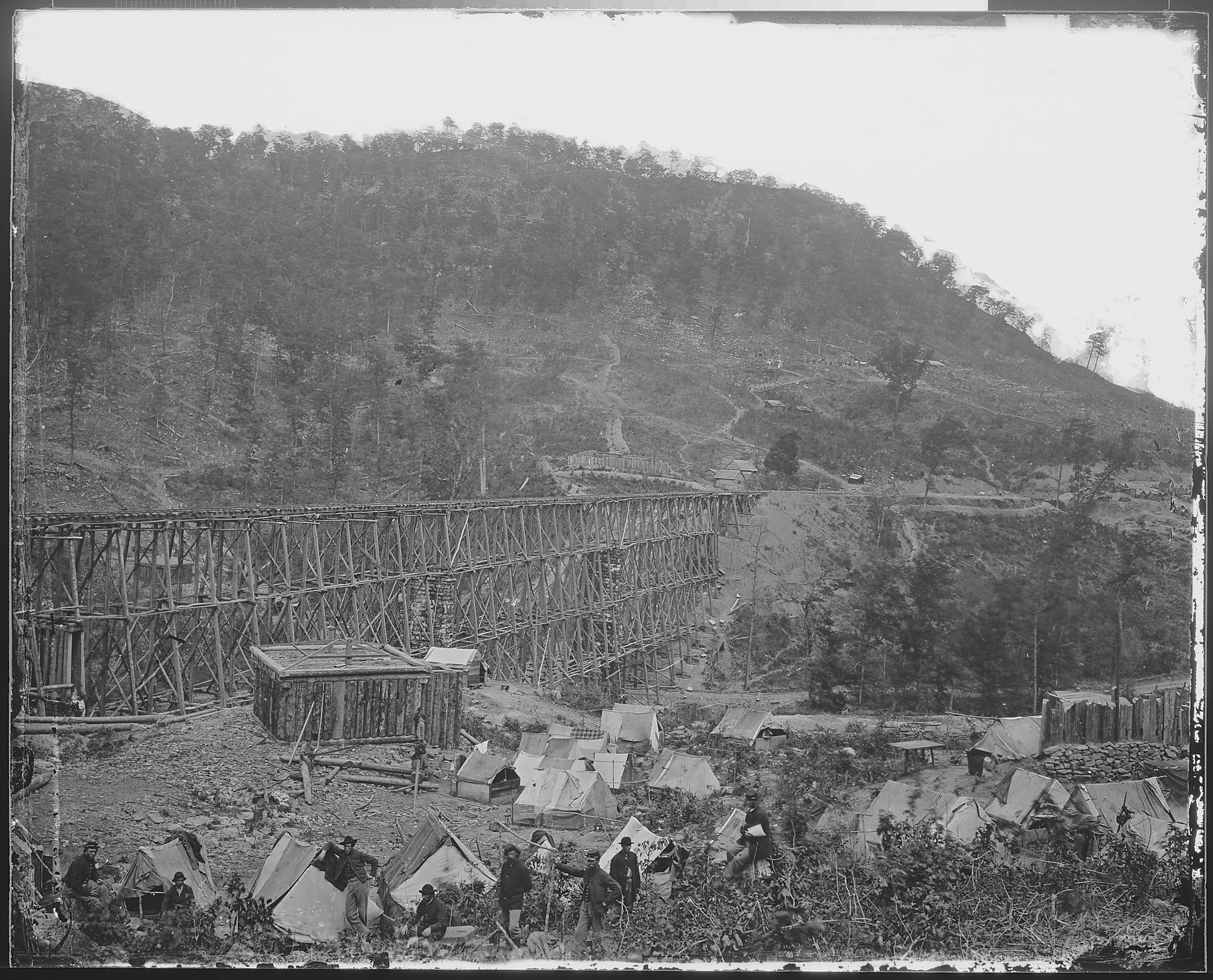
Pioneer company of the 59th Illinois Volunteer Regiment rebuilding the Nashville & Chattanooga Railroad bridge over Running Water Ravine near Whiteside, Tennessee after it was burned by retreating Confederate Army. Construction lasted for six weeks in December 1863-January 1864; first train crossed the bridge on January 14, 1864

The 59th Illinois Infantry Regiment was an infantry regiment that served in the Union Army during the American Civil War. It was formed as the 9th Missouri Infantry Regiment in September 1861, and changed name to the 59th Illinois Infantry Regiment in February 1862.

== Service ==
Organized at St. Louis, Mo., as the "Washington Zouves" and mustered into Federal service as the 9th Missouri Volunteers, September 18, 1861 (Cos. "A," "B," "C" at Cape Girardeau from August 6, 1861). Regiment moved to Jefferson Barracks, Mo., September 21, 1861; thence to Booneville, Mo., September 30. Attached to Kelton's Brigade, Pope's Division, Fremont's Army of the West, to November, 1861. Department of Missouri to February, 1862. (Designation of Regiment changed to 59th Illinois Infantry February 12, 1862.) 2nd Brigade, 3rd Division, Army of Southwest Missouri, to June, 1862. 1st Brigade, 4th Division, Army of Mississippi, to September, 1862. 30th Brigade, 9th Division, Army of the Ohio, to October, 1862. 30th Brigade, 9th Division, 3rd Corps, Army of the Ohio, to November, 1862. 1st Brigade, 1st Division, Right Wing 14th Army Corps, Army of the Cumberland, to January, 1863. 1st Brigade, 1st Division, 20th Army Corps, Army of the Cumberland, to October, 1863. 2d Brigade, 1st Division, 4th Corps, October, 1863. 3rd Brigade, 1st Division, 4th Army Corps, to May 1864. 2nd Brigade, 1st Division, 4th Army Corps, to August, 1864. 3rd Brigade, 1st Division, 4th Army Corps, August, 1864. 2nd Brigade, 3rd Division, 4th Army Corps, to August, 1865. Department of Texas to December, 1865.

== Detailed Service ==
The 59th Illinois Infantry was originally organized as the "Washington Zouaves" at the St. Louis Arsenal, and was intended to form a Missouri "Zouave Brigade" in association with the 8th Missouri Infantry Regiment. However, it was subsequently organized and uniformed as a standard infantry regiment and mustered into Federal service on September 18, 1861, as the 9th Missouri Volunteers. While organized in St. Louis and originally mustered in as a Missouri regiment, the majority of soldiers were from the state of Illinois and the regiment was transferred to the control of the Adjutant General of Illinois on February 12, 1862, and redesignated the 59th Illinois Volunteer Infantry.

Fremont's advance on Springfield, Missouri, October 13-November 3, 1861. March to Syracuse November 9–17, thence to LaMine River December 7 and to Georgetown, Mo., December 15. To LaMine Bridge December 23 and duty there till January 25, 1862. Curtis' advance on Springfield, Mo., January 25-February 11. Campaign against Sterling Price's forces in northern Arkansas February and March. Battle of Pea Ridge, Ark., March 6–8. March to Sugar Creek March 10, thence to Cross Timbers. March to Batesville April 5-May 3. Moved to Cape Girardeau, Mo., thence to Pittsburg Landing, Tennessee., May 11–24. Advance on and siege of Corinth, Mississippi, May 26–30. Pursuit to Booneville, Mississippi June 1–16. Duty at Jacinto, Mississippi, till August 4. Reconnaissance to Bay Springs, Mississippi, August 4–7. Bay Springs August 5. March to Murfreesboro, Tennessee, August 8-September 1, thence to Louisville, Ky., in pursuit of Braxton Bragg's army, September 3–26. Pursuit of Bragg into Kentucky October 1–15. Battle of Perryville, Ky., October 8. Lancaster October 15. March to Nashville, Tennessee, October 17-November 7 and duty there till December 26. Wilson's Creek Pike December 25. Advance on Murfreesboro, Tenn., December 26–30. Nolensville, Tennessee, Knob Gap, November 26. Triune, Tennessee December 27. Battle of Stones River December 30–31, 1862, and January 1–3, 1863. At Murfreesboro till June. Reconnaissance to Versailles, Kentucky March 9–14. Operations on Edgeville Pike June 4. Middle Tennessee or Tullahoma Campaign June 24-July 7. Battle of Liberty Gap June 24–27. Occupation of Middle Tennessee till August 16. Passage of the Cumberland Mountains and Tennessee River and Chickamauga-Chattanooga Campaign Campaign August 16-September 22. Guard supply trains over Mountain in rear of Bragg's army during Battle of Chickamauga. Siege of Chattanooga, Tenn., September 24-October 27. Reopening Tennessee River October 26–29. Chattanooga-Ringgold Campaign November 23–27. Battle of Lookout Mountain November 23–24. Battle of Missionary Ridge November 25. Battles of Taylor's Ridge and Ringgold Gap, November 27. At Whiteside, Ala., till January 27, 1864. Regiment veteranized January 12, 1864. Veterans on furlough January 27-March 19. Moved to Cleveland, Tenn., and duty there till May. Atlanta (Ga.) Campaign May 1 to September 8, 1864. Battle of Tunnel Hill May 6–7. Demonstration on Rocky Face Ridge May 8–11. Buzzard's Roost Gap May 8–9. Demonstration against Dalton, Georgia May 9–13. Battle of Resaca May 14–15. Near Kingston May 18–19. Near Cassville May 19. Advance on Dallas May 22–25. Operations on line of Pumpkin Vine Creek and battles about Dallas, New Hope Church and Allatoona Hills May 25-June 5. Operations about Marietta and against Kennesaw Mountain June 10-July 2. Pine Hill June 11–14. Lost Mountain June 15–17. Assault on Kennesaw Mountain June 27. Battle of Ruff's Station, Smyrna Camp Ground, July 4. Chattahoochee River July 5–17. Battle of Peachtree Creek Creek July 19–20. Siege of Atlanta July 22-August 25. Flank movement on Jonesboro August 25-80. Red Oak August 28–29. Rough and Ready August 31. Battle of Jonesborough August 31-September 1. Battle of Lovejoy's Station September 2–6. Pursuit of General John Bell Hood's army, into Alabama, October 3–26. Nashville Campaign November–December. Columbia, Duck River, November 24–27. Battle of Franklin November 30. Battle of Nashville December 15–16. Pursuit of Hood, to the Tennessee River, December 17–28. Moved to Huntsville, Alabama., and duty there till March, 1865. Expedition to Bull's Gap, Tennessee and operations in East Tennessee March 15-April 22. At Nashville, Tenn., till June. Moved to New Orleans, La., June 16, thence to Indianola, Texas, July 7. Duty at San Antonio, Texas and at New Braunfels, Texas, till December.

The regiment was mustered out on December 8, 1865.

== Total strength and casualties ==
The regiment suffered 4 officers and 105 enlisted men who were killed in action or mortally wounded and 4 officers and 117 enlisted men who died of disease, for a total of 230 fatalities.

== Commanders ==
- Colonel John C. Kelton - resigned on March 1, 1862
- Colonel Philip Sidney Post - mustered out with the regiment
- Lieutenant Colonel Calvin Harlowe Frederick - paralyzed at battle of Pea Ridge March 1862

== See also ==
- List of Illinois Civil War Units
- Illinois in the American Civil War
