= Edward C. Akin =

American lawyer and politician

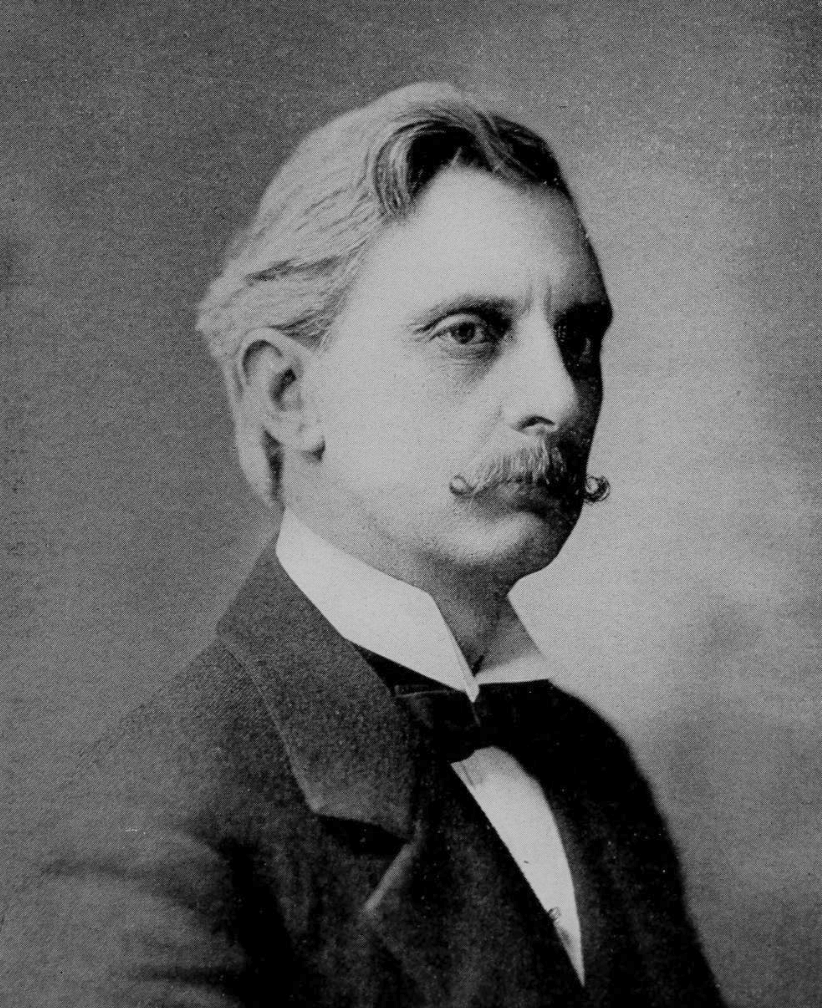

Illinois Attorney General
- In office 1897–1901

Mayor of Joliet, Illinois
- In office 1895

Personal details
- Born: July 19, 1852 Lockport Township, Illinois, U.S.
- Died: June 21, 1936 (aged 83) Joliet, Illinois, U.S.
- Resting place: Oakwood Cemetery, Joliet
- Party: Republican
- Spouse: Louise M. McRoberts (m. 1877)
- Education: University of Michigan
- Occupation: Lawyer, politician
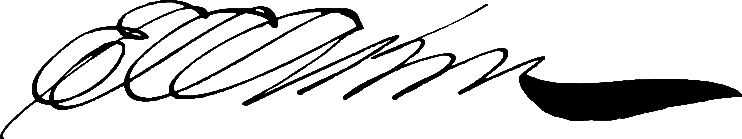
- Signature

Edward C. Akin (July 19, 1852 – June 21, 1936) was an American lawyer and politician.

== Biography ==
Edward C. Akin was born in Lockport Township, Will County, Illinois on July 19, 1852. He attended the Joliet, Illinois public school system and went to college at the University of Michigan. He worked as a teller at the First National Bank of Joliet.

He married Louise M. McRoberts in 1877.

In 1878, Akin was admitted to the Illinois bar. He served as Joliet City Attorney in 1887 and as State's Attorney of Will County in 1888. In 1895, Akin was elected Mayor of Joliet and was a Republican.

From 1897 to 1901, Akin served as Illinois Attorney General.

Akin died at his house in Joliet, Illinois on June 21, 1936, and was buried at Oakwood Cemetery.

== See also ==
- List of mayors of Joliet, Illinois

== Notes ==
Party political offices
Preceded by George W. Prince	Republican nominee for Attorney General of Illinois; 1896	Succeeded by Howland J. Hamlin
Legal offices
Preceded by Maurice T. Moloney	Attorney General of Illinois; 1897 – 1901	Succeeded by Howland J. Hamlin
