= Bob O'Dekirk =

American politician and police officer

Mayor of Joliet, Illinois
- In office May 4, 2015 – May 1, 2023
- Preceded by: Thomas Giarrante
- Succeeded by: Terry D'Arcy

Personal details
- Born: 1969 or 1970 (age 56–57) Chicago, Illinois, U.S.
- Party: Republican
- Children: 3
- Education: University of Illinois; John Marshall Law School
- Profession: Attorney

Bob O'Dekirk (/ˈoʊdəkɜːrk/ OH-də-kurk; born 1969/70) is the former mayor of Joliet, Illinois from 2015 to 2023. He was sworn in on May 4, 2015. O'Dekirk is a former Joliet police officer and is a practicing attorney in Joliet.

== Education ==
O'Dekirk descends from Canaryville Irish in Chicago. He graduated in 1987 from Oak Forest High School, where he boxed and played football and baseball; in 1987 he was named All-Conference in baseball. He earned an undergraduate degree in 1991 from the University of Illinois and his degree in law in 2003 from the John Marshall Law School.

== Career ==
Beginning in 1993 he worked for ten years as a uniformed and plainclothes officer for the Joliet police, winning the Martin S. Murrin Labor Award in 1995 and serving on the executive board of the local affiliate of the Fraternal Order of Police. After earning his law degree, he became an Assistant Corporate Counsel for the city of Chicago and worked on a task force prosecuting narcotics crimes. In 2006 he returned to Joliet and went into private practice.

In 2008–2009, he worked with the Department of State assisting in training police in Iraq. On his return to the US, he became a partner in the law firm of O’Dekirk, Allred & Associates.

O'Dekirk was elected to the Joliet City Council in 2011. and was elected mayor in 2015, unseating Tom Giarrante. He is also the city's liquor commissioner. His slogan as a mayoral candidate was "Joliet Can Be Great Again"; as mayor, he has emphasized conservative budgeting and economic development to make up for recent losses of employment and reduction in income from riverboat casinos.

In 2023, he lost his bid for a third term to Terry D'Arcy.

== Controversy ==
During his time as a law enforcement officer for the Joliet Police Department, O'Dekirk allegedly faced seven suspensions totaling forty-nine days as punishment stemming from undisclosed actions.

On May 31, 2020, O'Dekirk assaulted two Black Lives Matter protesters on Jefferson Street in Joliet. Videos of the incident, which became viral shortly thereafter, showed O'Dekirk grabbing a protester's neck with both hands, pushing him behind a police vehicle, and throwing him to the ground. In response to public outrage from the assault, O'Dekirk, who was not employed as a police officer at the time, claimed to have used "standard police tactics" to immobilize the protester. The City of Joliet paid $93,000 to the two victims of the assault in out-of-court settlements.

== Private life ==
O'Dekirk is married, and the couple has three children.

== See also ==
- List of mayors of Joliet, Illinois
