= List of mayors of Joliet, Illinois =

The following is a list of mayors of the city of Joliet, Illinois, United States.

- Cornelius Van Horne, c.1852-1854
- Joseph E. Streeter, c.1854-1855
- N. D. Elwood, c.1855-1857
- Firman Mack, c.1857-1859
- Francis Goodspeed, c.1859-1861
- Sherman W. Bowen, c.1861-1863, 1866-1867
- W. A. Strong, Jr., c.1863-1864
- Edwin Porter, c.1864-1866, 1871-1872, 1879-1883
- Elvis Harwood, c.1867-1869
- W. A. Steel, c.1869-1871, 1872-1873, 1875-1876
- William E. Henry, c.1873-1874
- A. Scheidt, c.1874-1875
- Royal E. Barber, c.1876-1877
- James G. Elwood, c.1877-1879
- Thomas J. Kelly, c.1883-1887
- John D. Paige, c.1887-1889
- Thomas J. Kelly, c.1889-1891
- Patrick C. Haley, c.1891-1893
- Henry H. Stassen, c.1893-1895
- Edward C. Akin, c.1895-1897
- Sebastian Lagger, c.1897-1899
- John B. Mount, c.1899-1901
- Richard J. Barr, c.1901-1903, 1905-1907
- William C. Crolius, c.1903-1905
- John R. Cronin, c.1907-1911
- Edmund M. Allen, c.1911-1913
- Harvey E. Wood, c.1913-1915
- William C. Barber, c.1915-1923
- George F. Sehring, c.1923-1931
- William A. Hennessy, c.1931-1935
- George T. Jones, c.1935-1943
- Arthur O. Janke, c.1943-1955
- James P. Hennessy, c.1955-1963
- Maurice Berlinsky, c.1963-1975
- Norman Keck, c.1975-1979
- John Bourg, c.1979-1987
- Charles P. Connor, c.1987-1991
- Arthur Schultz, 1991–2011
- Thomas Giarrante, 2011–2015
- Bob O'Dekirk, 2015-2023
- Terry D'Arcy, 2023–present

== See also ==
- Joliet history
