= Patrick J. Lucey (Illinois lawyer) =

American lawyer

Patrick Lucey
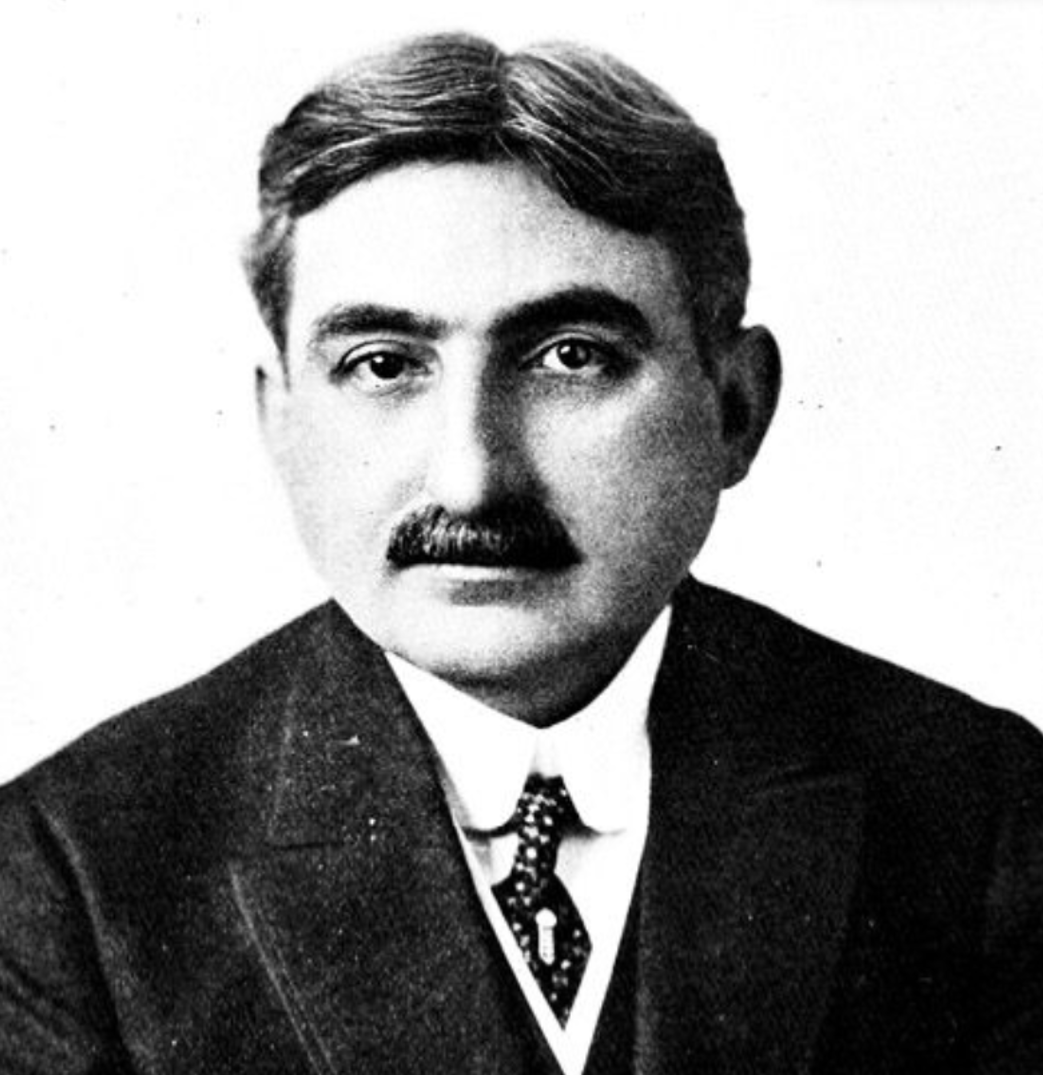

25th Illinois Attorney General
- In office 1913–1917
- Preceded by: William H. Stead
- Succeeded by: Edward J. Brundage

Personal details
- Born: May 2, 1873 Streator, Illinois, U.S.
- Died: November 17, 1947 (aged 74) Chicago, Illinois, U.S.
- Party: Democratic
- Profession: Attorney

Patrick Joseph Lucey (May 2, 1873 – November 17, 1947) was an American politician and lawyer.

Born in Streator, Illinois, Lucey studied law in Chicago, Illinois and was admitted to the Illinois bar in 1894. He then practiced law in Streator, Illinois. Lucey served as city attorney of Streator from 1897 to 1901, and then served as mayor of Streator from 1903 to 1907 and from 1909 to 1909. Lucey was a Democrat. From 1913 to 1917 Lucey served as Illinois Attorney General. Then, Lucey was appointed to the Illinois Public Utilities Commission in 1917 and served until 1920. He then practiced law in Chicago. Illinois and died there in 1947.

== Notes ==
Party political offices
Preceded by Ross C. Hall	Democratic nominee for Attorney General of Illinois; 1912, 1916	Succeeded by James T. Burns
Legal offices
Preceded by William H. Stead	Attorney General of Illinois; 1913 – 1917	Succeeded by Edward J. Brundage
