= William H. Stead =

American politician

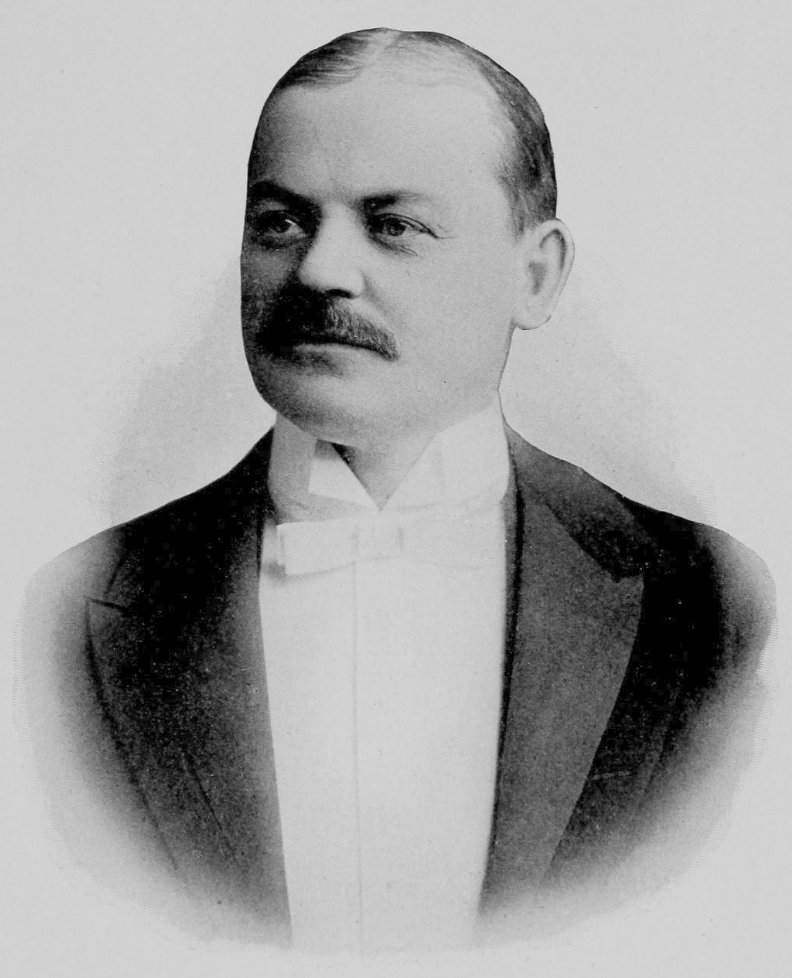

Illinois Attorney General
- In office 1905–1913

Personal details
- Born: William Henry Stead; June 12, 1858 Marseilles, Illinois, U.S.
- Died: April 13, 1918 (aged 59) Chicago, Illinois, U.S.
- Party: Republican
- Spouse: Ida Martin (m. 1883)
- Education: Central Normal College; DePauw University
- Occupation: Politician, lawyer

William Henry Stead (June 12, 1858 – April 13, 1918) was an American politician and lawyer.

== Biography ==
William H. Stead was born on a farm near Marseilles, Illinois on June 12, 1858. He went to Central Normal College, in Ladoga, Indiana and DePauw University. In 1882, Stead was admitted to the Illinois bar and practiced law in Ottawa, Illinois.

He married Ida Martin on September 12, 1883.

A Republican, Stead served as Ottawa City Attorney and States Attorney for LaSalle County, Illinois. From 1905 until 1913, he served as Illinois Attorney General. He was chief counsel for Chicago and Rock Island Railway Company and also served as Director of the Illinois Department of Trade and Commerce.

On April 13, 1918, Stead killed himself with a firearm in a hotel in Chicago.

== Notes ==
Party political offices
Preceded by Howland J. Hamlin	Republican nominee for Attorney General of Illinois; 1904, 1908, 1912	Succeeded by Edward J. Brundage
Legal offices
Preceded by Howland J. Hamlin	Attorney General of Illinois; 1905 – 1913	Succeeded by Patrick J. Lucey
