= George Hunt (attorney) =

American lawyer and politician

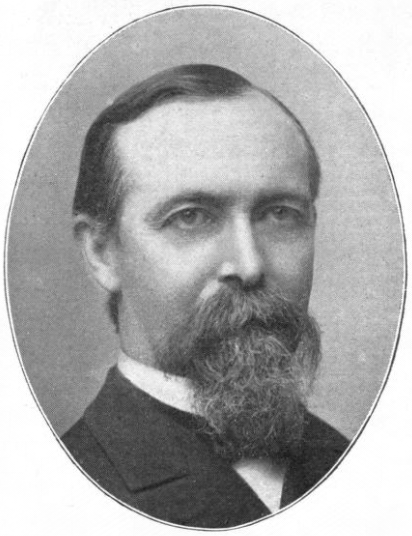

Illinois Attorney General
- In office 1885–1893

Member of the Illinois State Senate
- In office 1878–1894

Personal details
- Born: May 1, 1841 Knox County, Ohio, U.S.
- Died: March 17, 1901 (aged 59) Riverside, Illinois, U.S.
- Resting place: Oak Ridge Cemetery
- Spouse: Eugenia Jones (m. 1880)
- Occupation: Lawyer, politician, military officer

George Hunt (May 1, 1841 – March 17, 1901) was an American politician and lawyer.

== Life ==
Born in Knox County, Ohio, Hunt moved with his sister and her husband to Edgar County, Illinois. Hunt worked on the farm and went to school at Edgar Academy in Paris, Illinois and Waveland Academy in Indiana. Hunt taught school.

During the American Civil War, Hunt served in the 12th Illinois Volunteer Infantry Regiment. He then was superintendent of schools and studied law. In 1867, Hunt was admitted to the Illinois bar and opened a law office in Paris, Illinois. Hunt served as master in chancery for the Illinois circuit court. From 1878 to 1894, Hunt served in the Illinois State Senate. Hunt then served as Illinois Attorney General from 1885 to 1893. In 1893, Hunt moved to Chicago, Illinois and continued to practice law.

He married Eugenia Jones on February 3, 1880.

Hunt died at his house in Riverside, Illinois after a long illness. He was buried at Oak Ridge Cemetery in Springfield.

== Notes ==
Party political offices
Preceded by James A. McCartney	Republican nominee for Attorney General of Illinois; 1884, 1888	Succeeded by George W. Prince
Legal offices
Preceded by James A. McCartney	Attorney General of Illinois; 1885 – 1893	Succeeded by Maurice T. Moloney
