= George F. Barrett =

American politician

George Francis Barrett
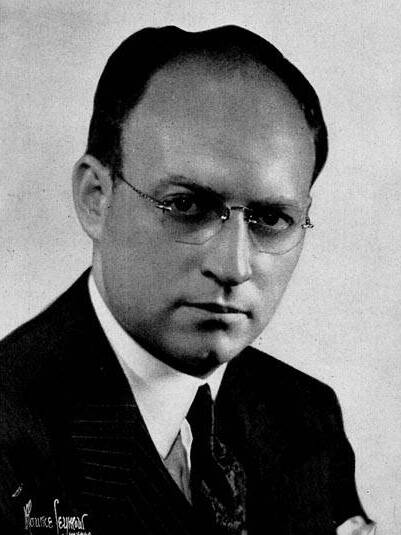
- Barrett, circa 1945

30th Illinois Attorney General
- In office 1941–1949
- Governor: Dwight H. Green
- Preceded by: John Edward Cassidy
- Succeeded by: Ivan A. Elliott

Personal details
- Born: Richard Curt Hottelet; November 17, 1907; Chicago, Illinois
- Died: December 2, 1980 (aged 73); Riverside, California
- Political party: Republican

George Francis Barrett (November 17, 1907 – December 2, 1980) served as Illinois Attorney General from 1941 to 1949.

== Early life and education ==
George F. Barrett, Jr. hailed from a prominent Chicago family. His father George F. Barrett, Sr. was chief justice of the Cook County (IL) Circuit Court. He earned his Bachelor of Arts from the University of Illinois and his Juris Doctor from Northwestern University.

== Career ==
Barrett gained recognition for his involvement in major civil rights cases, particularly his representation of individuals involved in the Nashville sit-in movement during the Civil Rights Era. His legal work was focused on protecting free speech and defending the rights of those challenging unjust systems. Additionally, Barrett represented conscientious objectors to the Vietnam War, further cementing his commitment to civil liberties.

One of his most notable legal achievements was his involvement in Geier v. Sundquist, a significant case concerning the desegregation of Tennessee's public university system. Barrett spent over 30 years advocating for students and faculty in this case, which played a critical role in the integration of higher education in the state.

Barrett's firm also litigated against discriminatory voting laws in Tennessee, and his legacy continues to influence civil rights advocacy through his contributions to the legal protection of individuals' rights in various spheres, including voting rights, gender equality, and environmental justice.

Party political offices
Preceded by Charles W. Hadley	Republican nominee for Attorney General of Illinois; 1940, 1944, 1948	Succeeded by Latham Castle
Legal offices
Preceded by John Edward Cassidy	Attorney General of Illinois; 1941–1949	Succeeded by Ivan A. Elliott
