= Terry D'Arcy =

American politician

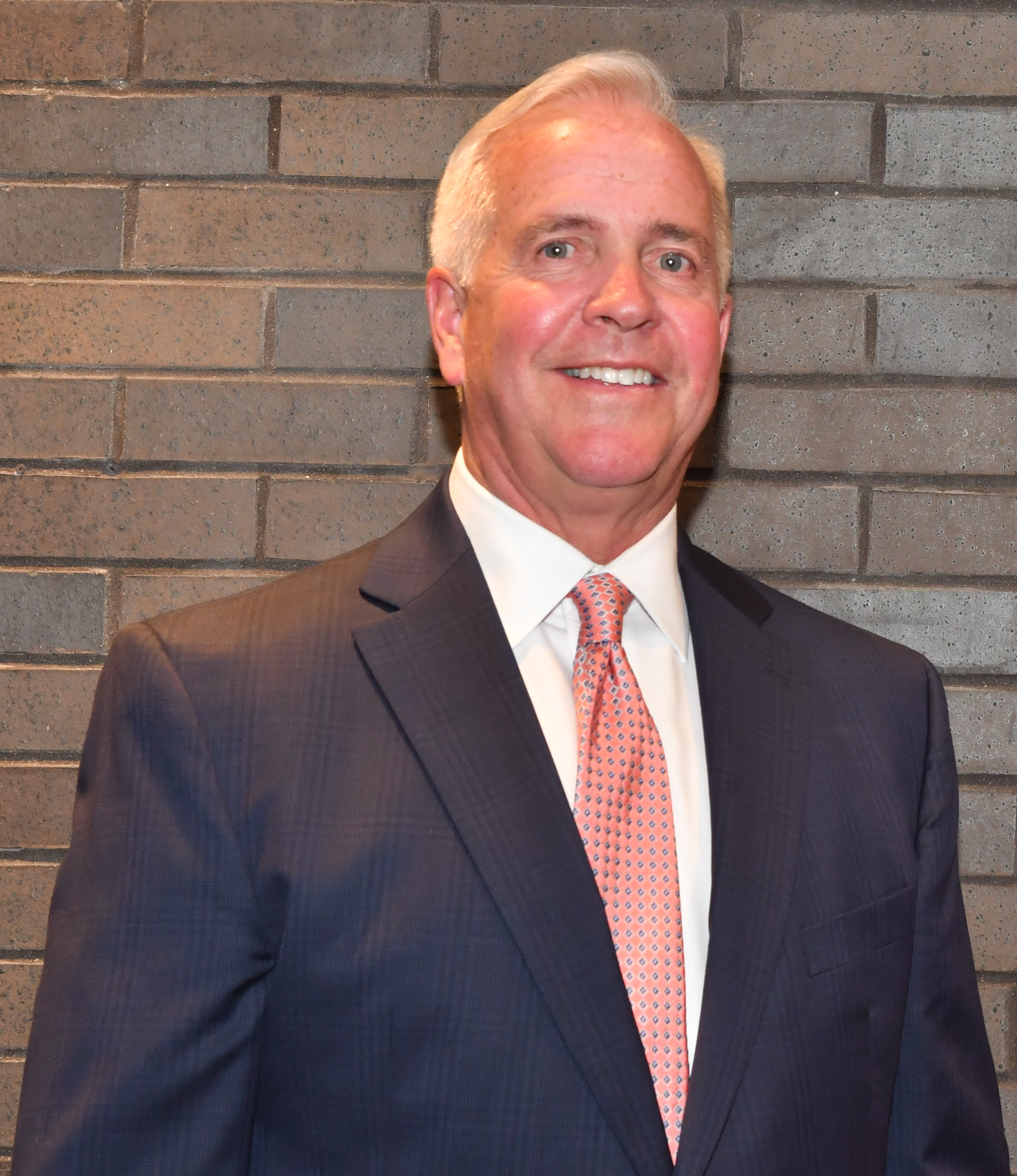
- D'Arcy in 2023

Mayor of Joliet, Illinois
- Incumbent
- Assumed office May 1, 2023
- Preceded by: Bob O'Dekirk

Personal details
- Party: Independent
- Spouse: Susan D'Arcy
- Children: 4
- Profession: Businessman

Terrence O. "Terry" D'Arcy is an American politician who is currently the mayor of Joliet, Illinois. D'Arcy has served as mayor since 2023.

== Career ==
=== Business career ===
D'Arcy is the president of D'Arcy Automobiles, an automotive dealership that serves Joliet and Morris, Illinois. In 2012, D'Arcy was appointed to serve on the Illinois Tollway Board, which he served on until 2016.

=== Political career ===
In 2022, D'Arcy announced that he would run for mayor of Joliet. D'Arcy was supported for the office by the Republican Party in the nonpartisan mayoral race against incumbent mayor Bob O'Dekirk, a conservative who had the support of various labor unions. D'Arcy's listed campaign goals as mayor were to improve the quality of life, the allocation and cleanliness of resources, and the public image of Joliet. D'Arcy was declared the winner of the mayoral election on April 4, 2023, garnering 61% of the vote, beating O'Dekirk who had 30% and Tycee Bell who had 9%. On May 1, D'Arcy was sworn in as mayor.

In his first year as mayor, D'Arcy sought to improve the entrance signs to Joliet to beautify the city. In an interview concerning his first year as mayor, D'Arcy admitted that the implementation of his campaign goals has gone slower than anticipated but claimed optimism about the future. D'Arcy is running for re-election in 2027.

== Personal life ==
D'Arcy is married to his wife, Susan, and has four children, along with two stepchildren.

D'Arcy has been recognized for philanthropy around Joliet. In 2016, Terry and Susan D'Arcy chaired the 59th Caritas Scholarship Ball. The following year, D'Arcy was part of a group that donated a new transport van to the Boys & Girls Club of Joliet. For his philanthropy, D'Arcy has been given a community award from ExxonMobil and the De La Salle award from Lewis University.

== See also ==
- List of mayors of Joliet, Illinois
