= Hugh Green (politician) =

American politician and lawyer

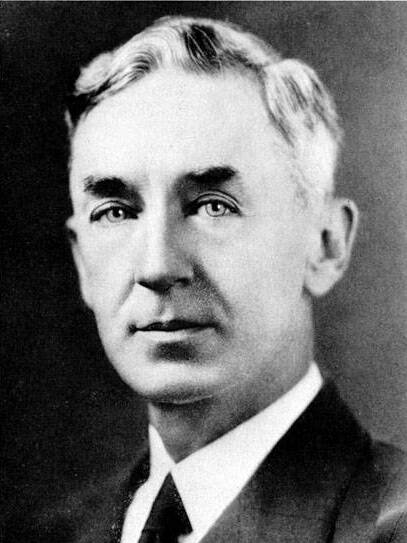
Green, circa 1945

Hugh Green (January 2, 1887 – November 30, 1968) was an American politician and lawyer.

Born on a farm near Nashville, Illinois, Green received his bachelor's degree from Illinois College and his law degree from Northwestern University School of Law. He practiced law in Jacksonville, Illinois. From 1925 to 1932, Green was state's attorney for Morgan County, Illinois and was a Republican. He served in the Illinois House of Representatives from 1933 until 1961 and was speaker of the house in 1945 and 1947. After Green left the house, he returned to his law practice in Jacksonville, Illinois.
