= Washington Bushnell =

American lawyer and politician

Washington Bushnell (September 20, 1825 – June 30, 1885) was an American lawyer and politician.

Born in Madison County, New York, Bushnell and his family moved to Kendall County, Illinois and settled in Lisbon, Illinois. In 1853, Bushnell graduated from the State and National Law School in Poughkeepsie, New York and was admitted to the New York bar. He moved to Ottawa, Illinois, in 1853, and practiced law. Bushnell served as Ottawa city attorney and as LaSalle County, Illinois state attorney. From 1860 to 1864, Bushnell served in the Illinois State Senate and was a Republican. From 1869 to 1873, Bushnell served as Illinois Attorney General. In 1880, Bushnell was a candidate for the United States House of Representatives and lost the nomination. Bushnell died of heart failure at his home in Ottawa, Illinois.

== Notes ==
Party political offices
First	Republican nominee for Attorney General of Illinois; 1868	Succeeded by James K. Edsall
Legal offices
Preceded by Robert G. Ingersoll	Attorney General of Illinois; 1869 – 1873	Succeeded by James K. Edsall
