= Otto Kerner Sr. =

American judge (1884–1952)

Otto Kerner
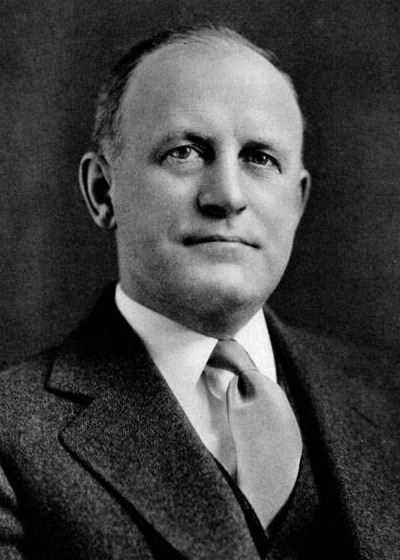
- Kerner circa 1933-34

Judge of the United States Court of Appeals for the Seventh Circuit
- In office November 21, 1938 – December 13, 1952
- Appointed by: Franklin D. Roosevelt
- Preceded by: Seat est. by 52 Stat. 584
- Succeeded by: Elmer Schnackenberg

28th Attorney General of Illinois
- In office 1932–1938
- Governor: Louis Lincoln Emmerson; Henry Horner
- Preceded by: Oscar E. Carlstrom
- Succeeded by: John Cassidy

Judge of the Illinois Appellate Court
- In office 1931–1932

Judge of the Circuit Court of Cook County
- In office 1927–1931

Chicago Alderman from the 12th Ward
- In office 1913–1919 Serving with Joseph I. Novak (1913–1914; 1916–1920) and Rudolph Mulac (1914–1916)
- Preceded by: William F. Schultz
- Succeeded by: Anton Cermak

Personal details
- Born: Otto Kerner; February 22, 1884 Chicago, Illinois, U.S.
- Died: December 13, 1952 (aged 68) Chicago, Illinois, U.S.
- Resting place: Bohemian National Cemetery; Chicago, Illinois
- Party: Democratic
- Spouse: Rosalie Chmelíková (m. 1907)
- Children: Otto Kerner Jr.
- Education: Lake Forest College (LLB)

Otto Kerner (February 22, 1884 – December 13, 1952) was the attorney general of Illinois and a United States circuit judge of the United States Court of Appeals for the Seventh Circuit. He was a member of the Democratic Party.

== Education and career ==
Kerner was born in Chicago, Illinois on February 22, 1884, to Czech immigrants Karel Boromejský Kerner (1852–1912) from Ronov nad Doubravou, and Josefa [née Šejbová] (1855–1921) from Hrazánky. Kerner received a Bachelor of Laws from Lake Forest College in 1905. He was in private practice of law in Chicago from 1905 to 1915. In 1911, Kerner was one of incorporators of the Bohemian Lawyers Association of Chicago. From 1915 to 1927, Kerner was a master in chancery of the Circuit Court of Cook County, Illinois. In 1927, he became a Judge of the Circuit Court of Cook County and in 1931 he became a Judge of the Illinois Appellate Court. In 1932, Kerner became Attorney General of Illinois, a position he held until 1938. He was a member of the Democratic Party.

=== Legal opinions in regards to the repeal of prohibition ===
As Illinois Attorney General, Kerner clarified the confusion as to whether liquor could be legally sold in Illinois following the ratification of the Twenty-first Amendment, and subsequent repeal of Prohibition, in December 1933. Kerner opined that the state statute governing the sale of 3.2 percent beer had nothing to do with the sale of liquor and other beverages of more than 3.2 percent after Repeal. As a result of Kerner's opinion, local breweries in Chicago announced that ales, stouts, and porters as strong as 4 and 5 percent would be placed on sale.

== Federal judicial service ==
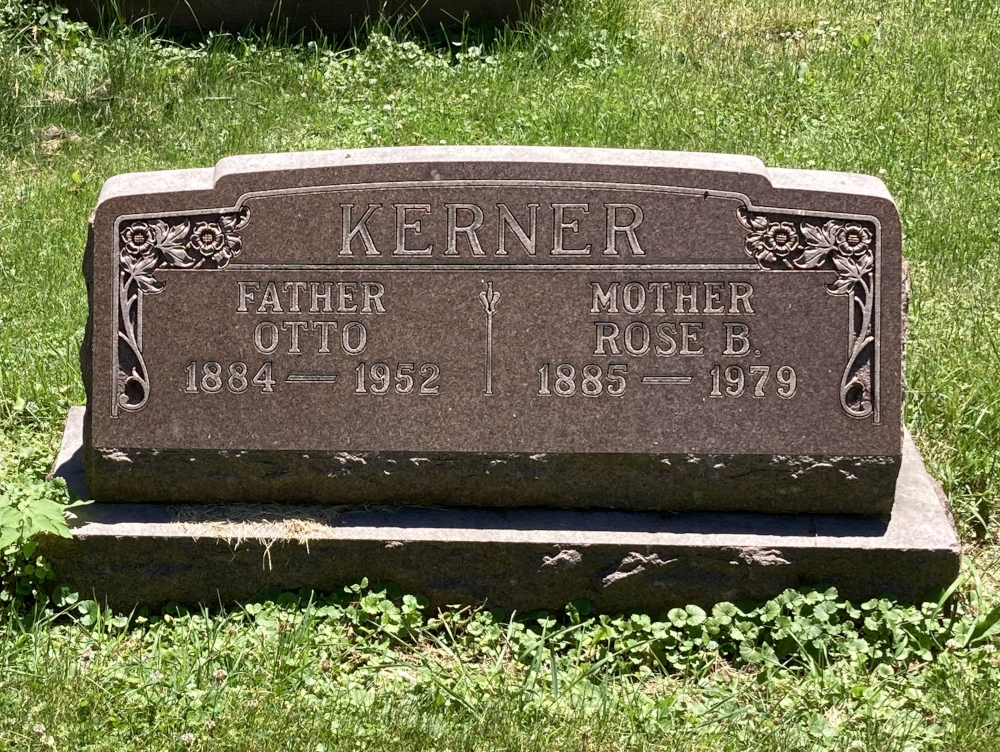
Kerner's grave at Bohemian National Cemetery

Kerner received a recess appointment from President Franklin D. Roosevelt on November 21, 1938, to the United States Court of Appeals for the Seventh Circuit, to a new seat authorized by 52 Stat. 584. He was nominated to the same position by Roosevelt on January 5, 1939. He was confirmed by the United States Senate on February 1, 1939, and received his commission on February 9, 1939.

He remained on the bench until his death in Chicago on December 13, 1952. Kerner was interred at the Bohemian National Cemetery in Chicago.

== Family ==
Kerner married Rosalie [née Chmelíková] (1885–1979) in Chicago in 1907. She was a Czech immigrant from Lišov. Their son Otto Kerner Jr. was twice elected Democratic Governor of Illinois, serving from 1961 to 1968, and also served as a Judge of the Seventh Circuit from 1968 to 1974.

== Sources ==
- "Bohemian Lawyers Association of Chicago". Archived from the original on February 5, 2006.
- Skilnik, Bob (2006). Beer: A History of Brewing in Chicago. Fort Lee, N.J.: Barricade Books Inc. ISBN 1-56980-312-9.

Party political offices
Preceded by Thomas J. Courtney	Democratic nominee for Attorney General of Illinois; 1932, 1936	Succeeded by Sveinbjorn Johnson
Legal offices
Preceded by Oscar E. Carlstrom	Attorney General of Illinois; 1932–1938	Succeeded by John Edward Cassidy
Preceded by Seat established by 52 Stat. 584	Judge of the United States Court of Appeals for the Seventh Circuit; 1938–1952	Succeeded by Elmer Jacob Schnackenberg
