= Howland J. Hamlin =

American lawyer, politician (1850–1909)

Howland Joseph Hamlin (July 13, 1850 – December 12, 1909) was an American lawyer and politician.

Born in St. Lawrence County, New York, Hamlin received his degree from the now State University of New York at Potsdam. He moved to Illinois in 1870 and taught school. Hamlin studied law and was admitted to the Illinois State Bar in 1875. He then practiced law in Shelbyville, Illinois and was involved in the Republican Party. From 1901 until 1905, Hamlin served as Illinois Attorney General. He was also the attorney for the Illinois Railroad and Warehouse Commission. After his term ended, he practiced law in Springfield, Illinois before returning to Shelbyville, Illinois where he died in 1909.

== Notes ==
Party political offices
Preceded by Edward C. Akin	Republican nominee for Attorney General of Illinois; 1900	Succeeded by William H. Stead
Legal offices
Preceded by Edward C. Akin	Attorney General of Illinois; 1901 – 1905	Succeeded by William H. Stead
