= Illinois Attorney General =

Attorney General for the U.S. state of Illinois

Attorney General of Illinois
- Seal of the attorney general

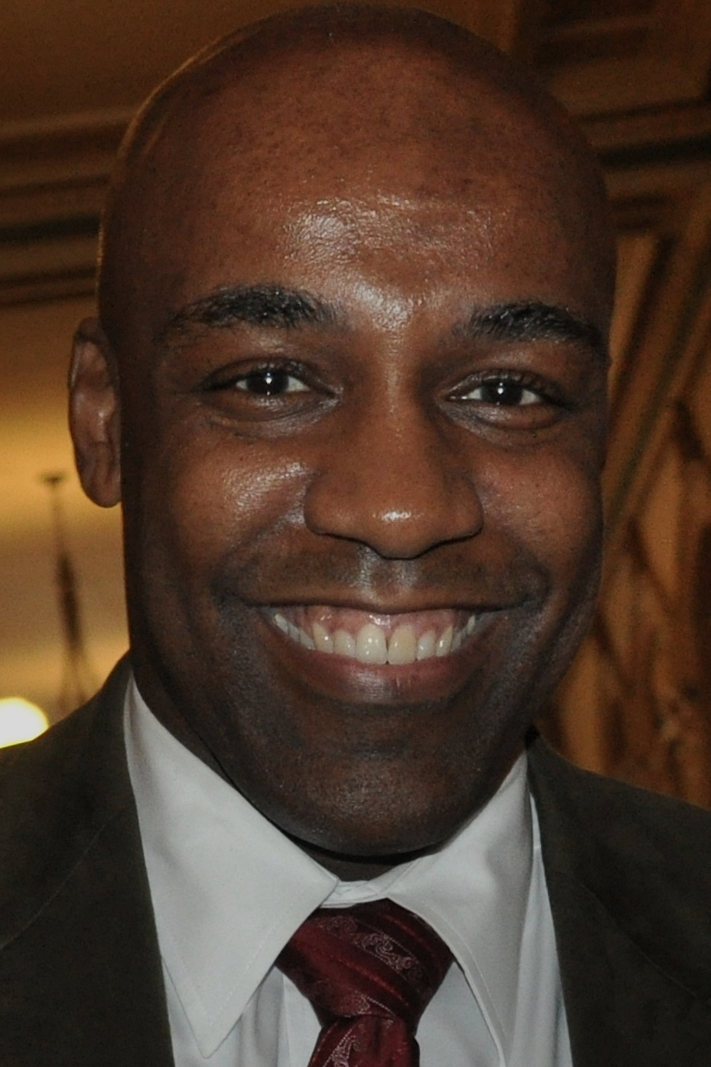
- Incumbent; Kwame Raoul since January 14, 2019
- Term length: 4 years
- Inaugural holder: Daniel Pope Cook
- Formation: December 3, 1818
- Succession: Second
- Website: www.illinoisattorneygeneral.gov

The Illinois attorney general is the highest legal officer of the state of Illinois in the United States. Originally an appointed office, it is now an office filled by statewide election. Based in Chicago and Springfield, the attorney general is responsible for providing legal counsel for the various state agencies, including the governor of Illinois and Illinois General Assembly, as well as conducting all legal affairs pertaining to the state.

The office of Illinois Attorney General was established on December 3, 1818, based on guidelines adopted by a state constitutional convention. The attorney general is second (behind the lieutenant governor) in the line of succession to the office of Governor of Illinois. The first person to fulfill the duties of the office was Daniel Pope Cook who only served eleven days, and was later elected to the United States Congress. Cook County was named in his honor.

The current holder of the office is Kwame Raoul.

== Role ==
Under the Constitution of Illinois, the attorney general is the state's chief legal officer, and has the powers and duties prescribed by law. The attorney general's duties include advocating for the people of Illinois, working with the General Assembly to push for new legislation, and litigating to ensure that state laws are followed. The state's Attorney General Act specifies several duties, including:

- Represent the people of Illinois before the Supreme Court where the state or the people of the state are interested parties
- Prosecute all proceedings and actions in favor of the state
- Defend state officers acting in their official capacities in any actions or proceedings against them
- Consult with and advise the state's attorneys
- Investigate violations of all statutes that the attorney general has a duty to enforce
- Advise the governor and other state officers, and give written opinions on legal or constitutional matters when requested
- Give written opinions to the General Assembly or any of its committees when requested
- Prepare drafts of contracts in which the state is interested
- Attend, present evidence to, and prosecute indictments by the statewide grand jury
- Ensure the proper allocation of funds appropriated to public institutions, and prosecute breaches of trust

The attorney general also oversees the Public Access Counselor, which is responsible for enforcing the state's Freedom of Information Act and Open Meetings Act.

== List of attorneys general ==
Parties

Democratic (21) Republican (17) Democratic-Republican (4)

#	Image	Name	Political party	Term
1		Daniel Pope Cook	Democratic-Republican	1819
2		William Mears	Democratic-Republican	1819–1821
3		Samuel D. Lockwood	Democratic-Republican	1821–1822
4		James Turney	Democratic-Republican	1822–1829
5		George Forquer	Democratic	1829–1832
6		James Semple	Democratic	1832–1834
7		Ninian Wirt Edwards	Democratic	1834–1835
8		Jesse B. Thomas Jr.	Democratic	1835–1836
9		Walter B. Scates	Democratic	1836–1837
10		Usher F. Linder	Democratic	1837–1838
11		George W. Olney	Democratic	1838–1839
12		Wickliffe Kitchell	Democratic	1839–1840
13		Josiah Lamborn	Democratic	1840–1843
14		James A. McDougall	Democratic	1843–1846
15		David B. Campbell	Democratic	1846–1848
Office abolished 1848–1867
16		Robert G. Ingersoll	Republican	1867–1869
17		Washington Bushnell	Republican	1869–1873
18		James K. Edsall	Republican	1873–1881
19		James A. McCartney	Republican	1881–1885
20		George Hunt	Republican	1885–1893
21		Maurice T. Moloney	Democratic	1893–1897
22		Edward C. Akin	Republican	1897–1901
23		Howland J. Hamlin	Republican	1901–1905
24		William H. Stead	Republican	1905–1913
25		Patrick J. Lucey	Democratic	1913–1917
26		Edward J. Brundage	Republican	1917–1925
27		Oscar E. Carlstrom	Republican	1925–1933
28		Otto Kerner Sr.	Democratic	1932–1938
29		John Edward Cassidy	Democratic	1938–1941
30		George F. Barrett	Republican	1941–1949
31		Ivan A. Elliott	Democratic	1949–1953
32		Latham Castle	Republican	1953–1959
33		Grenville Beardsley	Republican	1959–1960
34		William L. Guild	Republican	1960–1961
35		William G. Clark	Democratic	1961–1969
36		William J. Scott	Republican	1969–1980
37		Tyrone C. Fahner	Republican	1980–1983
38		Neil F. Hartigan	Democratic	1983–1991
39		Roland W. Burris	Democratic	1991–1995
40		Jim Ryan	Republican	1995–2003
41		Lisa Madigan	Democratic	2003–2019
42		Kwame Raoul	Democratic	2019–present

== See also ==
- List of law enforcement agencies in Illinois
