= American Medical Liberty League =

The American Medical Liberty League (AMLL) was an organization headquartered in Chicago which opposed many mainstream medical practices, such as vaccinations and medical licensure. It was extant from 1918 until the early 1930s.

== Organizational history ==
The AMLL was founded on August 15, 1918 and was headquartered in Chicago, Illinois. It stood largely opposed to the American Medical Association (AMA). By 1929, the organization had chapters in 41 of the then-48 U.S. states. Letterhead by the organization described its mission as fighting for "a citizen’s movement for medical liberty on the same basis as religious liberty with the same constitutional guarantees."

Heavily involved in AMLL's founding was Lora C. Little, who would be the driving force of the organization. Little was one of the few women to be a leading figure of the era's anti-vaccinationist movement. The president of the AMLL was Charles M. Higgins, who had been involved in the National League for Medical Freedom, the New York Anti-Vivisection Society, and the Anti-Vaccination League of America. The vice president was Eli Jones. D. W. Ensign, the owner of a Battle Creek, Michigan-based patent medicine mail-order business, served as treasurer and was more involved in the operations than either Higgins or Jones.

After the 1931 death of Little, the AMLL declined and ultimately met its demise. However, literature and pamphlets that they had created were still circulating into the late-1950s.

== Stances and activities ==
The organization was a leader in the anti-vaccine movement.

The AMLL was also a leader in opposition to mainstream medicine (allopathic medicine). The organization gave voice to alternative medicine "drugless healers" in opposing the influence of the American Medical Association (AMA), including its role in regulating medical school and medical licensing. The organization was opposed to medical licensing in general. The AMLL opposed the preference that practicers of allopathic medicine were given in medical schools, and the disregard that "drugless healers" were given by medical schools.

The organization also opposed quarantines. The organization was supportive of Jennie Barmore, a woman deemed an asymptomatic carrier of typhoid who was opposed to the quarantine that she was placed under by the Chicago Health Commissioner John Dill Robertson and Chicago government epidemiologist Herman Bundesen. They helped recruit lawyer Clarence Darrow to represent Barmore in her litigation against Robertson and Bundensen. Barmore's litigation was unsuccessful in relieving her of her quarantine, but did result in a ruling that weakened the authority of the Chicago health commissioner.

The organization also opposed to pure food and drug laws and the testing of cattle for tuberculin.

Ahead of the 1928 United States presidential election, the AMLL endorsed Republican nominee Herbert Hoover. Hoover's remarks, such as his support for rugged individualism, had inspired hope for the AMLL that he would share their priorities. However, within the first month of his subsequent presidency the organization was dismayed by Hoover's proposal to establish a federal department of health, education, and welfare headed by a former president of the AMA.

== Central Health Committee of Illinois ==
In the AMLL's first year, Lora C. Little formed a partnership between the organization and the National Public School Protective League to establish the Central Health Committee (CHC) of Illinois. While officially "non-partisan", the goal of this entity was largely to oppose the Republican Party and its "political doctors", seeking to oppose officeholders and office seekers from that party.

When Illinois held a state constitutional convention in 1919, the CHC sought to have a "medical liberty" clause enshrined in the prospective new state constitution. The CHC also endorsed AMLL member Frederick Freeark, a Chicago resident, to serve as a delegate to the convention. The clause proposed by the CHC in part read,

The free exercise and enjoyment of the profession and practice of the healing art, without discrimination, shall be forever guaranteed; and no person shall be denied any civil or political right, privilege or capacity, on account of his convictions with reference to the healing of the body...No person shall be required to employ, or pay taxes to support, any practitioner or any system of healing against his consent, nor shall any preference be given to any school or system of healing.

The CHC involved itself in opposing some of the candidates seeking both parties' nominations ahead of the nominating conventions for the 1920 United States presidential election. The organization worked to prevent Senator Robert L. Owen from being in contention for the Democratic nomination ahead of the Democratic National Convention. Owen had previously authored an AMA-supported bill to empower the health mandates of several federal agencies. At the Republican National Convention, the CHC contributed to the successful effort to oppose Leonard Wood's presidential candidacy. Wood was a well-known allopath.
