= 1936 Illinois elections =

- November 3, 1936

Elections were held in Illinois on Tuesday, November 3, 1936.

Primaries were held April 14, 1936.

The elections overall saw a strong performance by the Democratic Party.

Democrats retained their control of both chambers of the Illinois General Assembly and all statewide executive offices, winning all the statewide executive offices by broad margins. Democrats swept the election for University of Illinois trustees. Democrats also carried the state in the presidential election. Democratic United States senator J. Hamilton Lewis was reelected. Democrats retained all 21 U.S. congressional seats they held in the state, while Republicans retained all six seats they held.

== Election information ==
=== Turnout ===
In the primaries, 2,674,613 ballots were cast (1,597,418 Democratic and 1,077,195 Republican).

In the general election, 3,995,088 ballots were cast.

== Federal elections ==
=== United States president ===
Illinois voted for the Democratic ticket of Franklin D. Roosevelt and John Nance Garner.

=== United States Senate ===
Democrat J. Hamilton Lewis won reelection to a second consecutive, and third overall, term in the United States Senate.

=== United States House ===
All 27 Illinois seats in the United States House of Representatives were up for election in 1936.

No seats switched parties. The partisan makeup of the state's United States House of Representatives delegation remained 21 Democrats and six Republicans.

== State elections ==
=== Governor ===
1936 Illinois gubernatorial election
- November 3, 1936
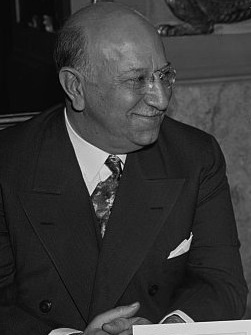

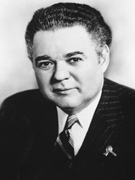
Nominee	Henry Horner	C. Wayland Brooks
Party	Democratic	Republican
Popular vote	2,067,861	1,682,685
Percentage	53.13%	43.24%
- County results Horner: 40–50% 50–60% 60–70% Brooks: 40–50% 50–60% 60–70%
Governor before election
Henry Horner
Democratic
Elected Governor
Henry Horner
Democratic

Incumbent first-term governor Henry Horner, a Democrat, won reelection.

==== Democratic primary ====
The Chicago political machine unsuccessfully ran Chicago Board of Health president Herman Bundesen against the incumbent Henry Horner in retribution for Horner having vetoed a bill that would have allowed bookies to legally operate, a bill favored by Chicago political bosses such as Edward J. Kelly.

===== Candidates =====
- Herman Bundesen, Chicago Board of Health president and Chicago health commissioner, former Cook County coroner
- Henry Horner, incumbent governor
- James Fred Robertson, 1934 U.S. Congress candidate and 1935 Chicago mayoral candidate

===== Results =====
Democratic gubernatorial primary
Party	Candidate	Votes	%
Democratic	Henry Horner (incumbent)	820,313	54.39
Democratic	Herman Bundesen	659,221	43.71
Democratic	James Fred Robertson	28,600	1.90
Write-in		1	0.00
Total votes		1,508,135	100

==== Republican primary ====
===== Candidates =====
- C. Wayland Brooks, former Cook County assistant state's attorney.
- Oscar E. Carlstrom, former Illinois attorney general
- George W. Dowell, former judge of the Illinois Court of Claims and Progressive nominee for Illinois's 25th congressional district in 1914.
- Thomas P. Gunning, incumbent Illinois state senator
- J. Paul Kuhn, former member of the Illinois Commerce Commission.
- John G. Oglesby, former lieutenant governor of Illinois (publicly withdrew before primary)
- Len Small, former governor of Illinois

Republican gubernatorial primary
Party	Candidate	Votes	%
Republican	C. Wayland Brooks	596,446	59.05
Republican	Len Small	268,903	26.62
Republican	Oscar E. Carlstrom	53,266	5.27
Republican	Thomas P. Gunning	31,194	3.09
Republican	J. Paul Kuhn	29,423	2.91
Republican	H. Wallace Caldwell	16,079	1.59
Republican	John G. Oglesby	7,568	0.75
Republican	George W. Dowell	7,125	0.71
Write-in		1	0.00
Total votes		1,010,005	100

==== General election ====
Challenging both Democratic nominee Henry Horner and Republican nominee Charles W. Brooks, Republican former Chicago mayor William Hale Thompson ran on the Union Progressive Party of Illinois' ballot line. There were also several other minor candidates.

Gubernatorial election
Party	Candidate	Votes	%
Democratic	Henry Horner (incumbent)	2,067,861	53.13
Republican	C. Wayland Brooks	1,682,685	43.24
Union Progressive	William Hale Thompson	128,962	1.00
Socialist	John Fisher	6,966	0.18
Prohibition	Harmon W. Reed	2,896	0.07
Socialist Labor	O. Alfred Olson	2,602	0.07
Write-in		4	
Total votes		3,891,976	100

=== Lieutenant governor ===
1936 Illinois lieutenant gubernatorial election
- November 3, 1936
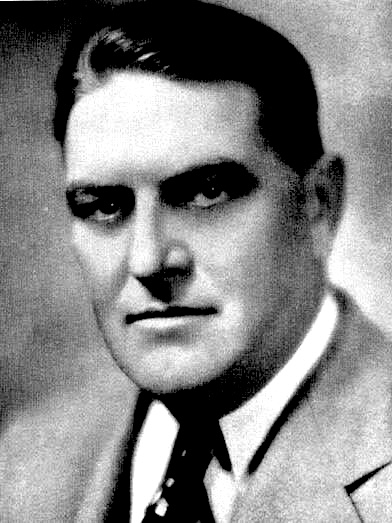

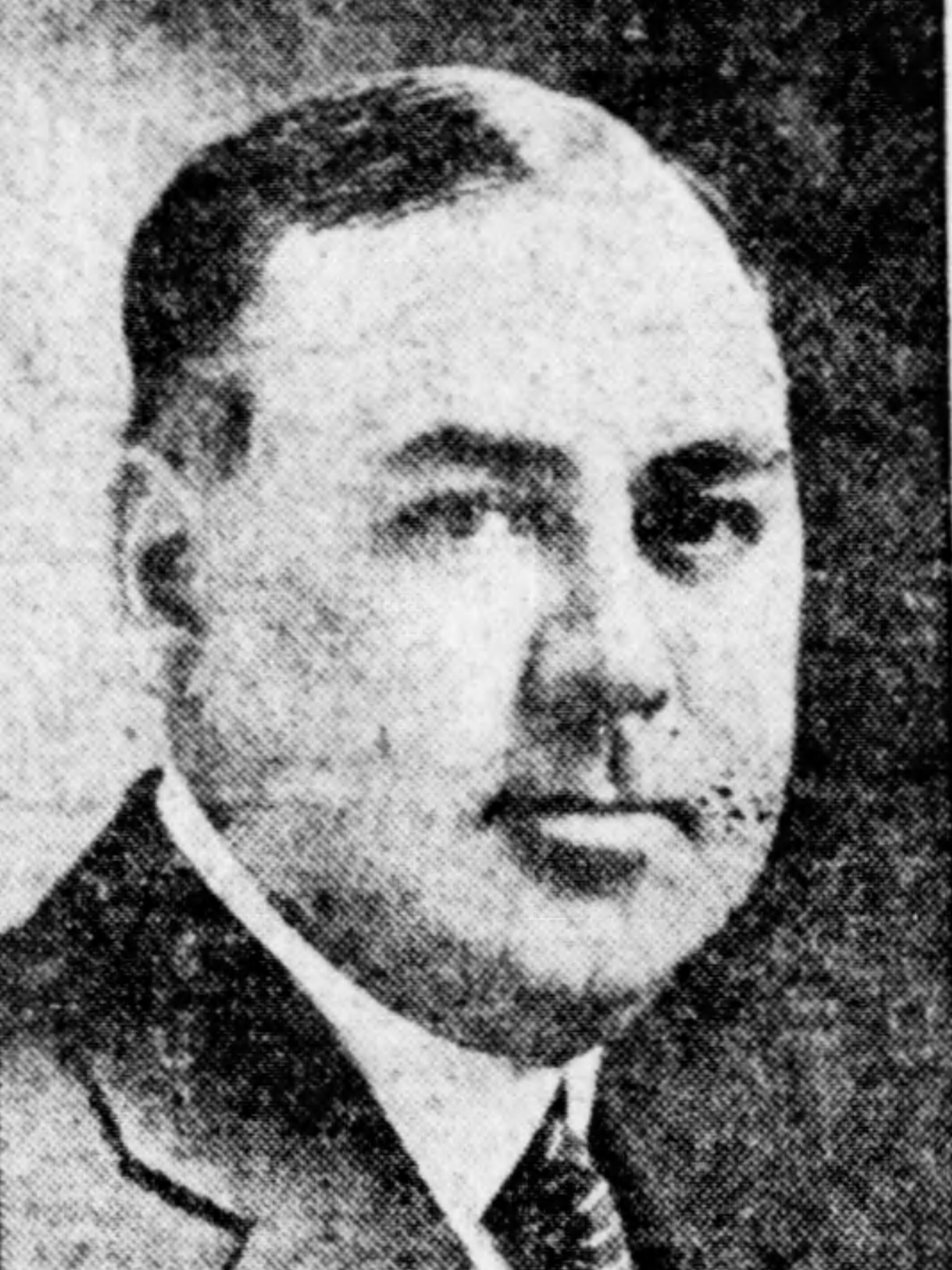
Nominee	John Henry Stelle	George Hatzenbuhler
Party	Democratic	Republican
Popular vote	2,103,226	1,539,342
Percentage	56.17%	41.11%
Lieutenant Governor before election
Thomas Donovan
Democratic
Elected Lieutenant Governor
John Henry Stelle
Democratic

Incumbent first-term lieutenant governor Thomas Donovan, a Democrat, did not seek reelection. Democrat John Henry Stelle was elected to succeed him.

==== Democratic primary ====
===== Candidates =====
- John Edward Cassidy, attorney
- Isaac Epstein
- John L. McCormack
- John Henry Stelle, Illinois treasurer

===== Results =====
Democratic lieutenant gubernatorial primary
Party	Candidate	Votes	%
Democratic	John Stelle	544,215	42.85
Democratic	John E. Cassidy	500,347	39.40
Democratic	John L. McCormack	172,313	13.57
Democratic	Isaac Epstein	53,118	4.18
Total votes		1,269,993	100

==== Republican primary ====
===== Candidates =====
- John V. Clinnin
- Harry F. Hamlin
- George Hatzenbuhler
- James A. McCallum
- Theodore D. Smith
- A. Lincoln Wisler

===== Results =====
Republican lieutenant gubernatorial primary
Party	Candidate	Votes	%
Republican	George Hatzenbuhler	234,884	28.49
Republican	James A. McCallum	190,009	23.04
Republican	John V. Clinnin	179,002	21.71
Republican	Theodore D. Smith	97,118	11.78
Republican	Harry F. Hamlin	90,837	11.02
Republican	A. Lincoln Wisler	32,695	3.97
Total votes		824,545	100

==== General election ====
Lieutenant gubernatorial election
Party	Candidate	Votes	%
Democratic	John Stelle	2,103,226	56.17
Republican	George Hatzenbuhler	1,539,342	41.11
Union Progressive	Fred R. Wolf	88,595	2.37
Socialist	Joseph Goldman	7,487	0.20
Prohibition	Clay F. Gaumer	3,153	0.08
Socialist Labor	Jacob Johns	2,324	0.06
Total votes		3,744,127	100

=== Attorney general ===
1936 Illinois Attorney General election
- November 3, 1936
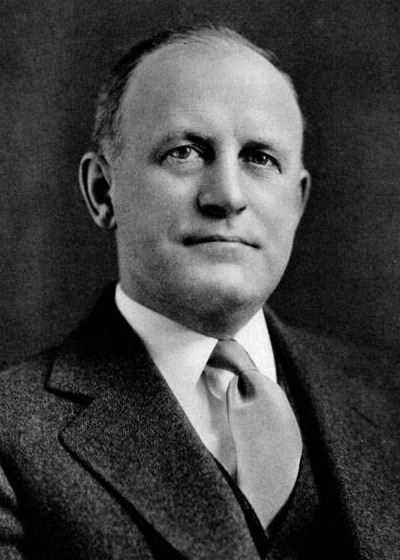

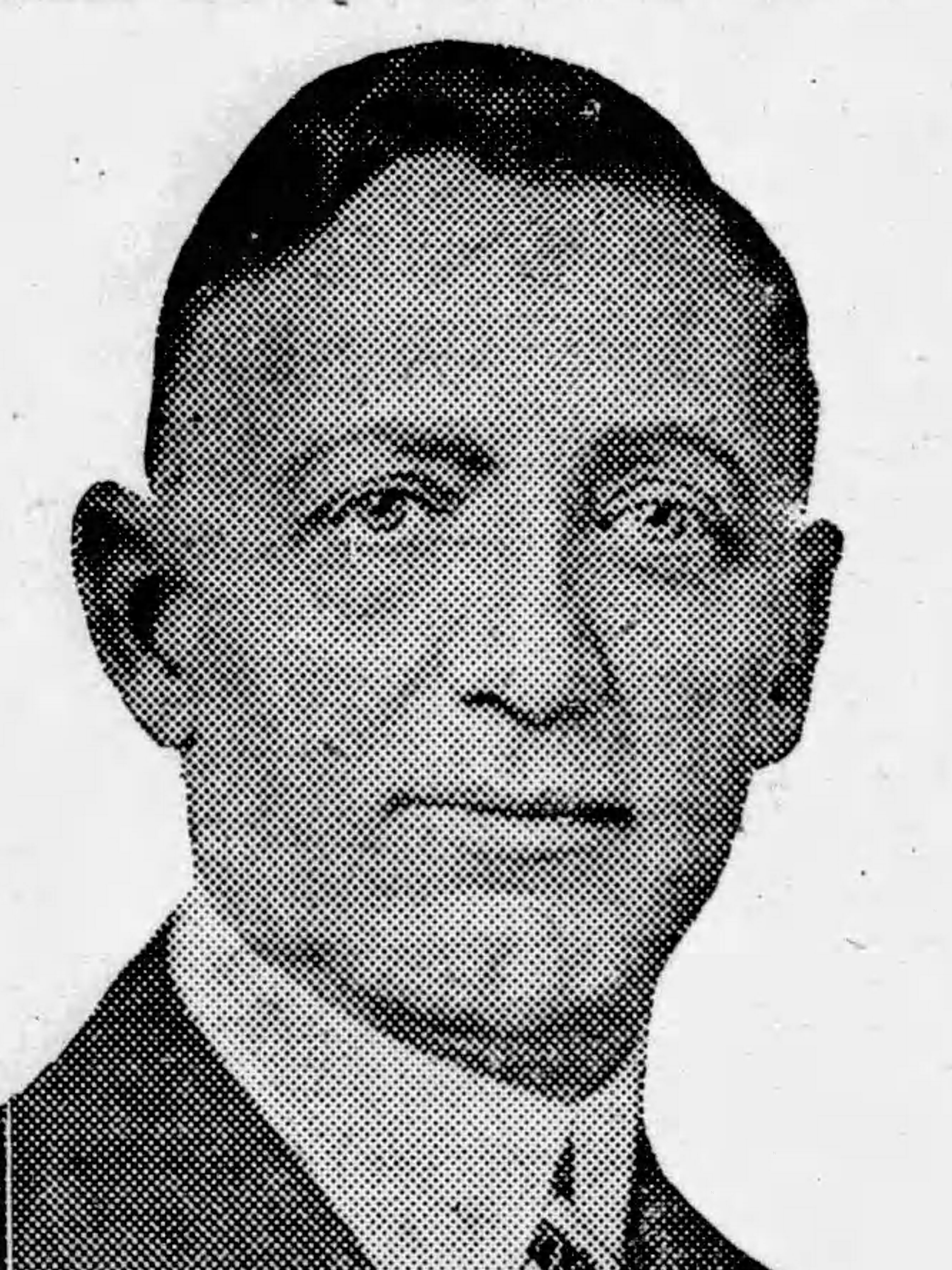
Nominee	Otto Kerner Sr.	Charles W. Hadley
Party	Democratic	Republican
Popular vote	2,116,673	1,531,842
Percentage	56.47%	40.87%
Attorney General before election
Otto Kerner Sr.
Democratic
Elected Attorney General
Otto Kerner Sr.
Democratic

Incumbent first-term Attorney General Otto Kerner Sr., a Democrat, was reelected.

==== Democratic primary ====
Attorney General Democratic primary
Party	Candidate	Votes	%
Democratic	Otto Kerner (incumbent)	1,126,894	58.20
Democratic	Charles W. Hadley	405,062	20.92
Democratic	Thomas V. Sullivan	308,669	15.94
Democratic	Berthold A. Cronson	95,627	4.94
Total votes		1,936,252	100

==== Republican primary ====
No candidates ran in the Republican primary. The party ultimately nominated Charles W. Hadley, who had been the distant runner-up in the Democratic primary.

==== General election ====
Attorney General election
Party	Candidate	Votes	%
Democratic	Otto Kerner (incumbent)	2,116,673	56.47
Republican	Charles W. Hadley	1,531,842	40.87
Union Progressive	Thomas V. Sullivan	86,351	2.30
Socialist	Meyer J. Myer	7,708	0.21
Prohibition	Frank S. Regan	3,254	0.09
Socialist Labor	Titus Anderson	2,495	0.07
Total votes		3,748,323	100

=== Secretary of State ===
1936 Illinois Secretary of State election
- November 3, 1936
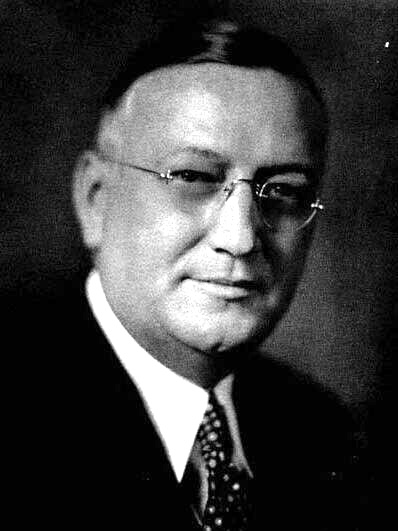

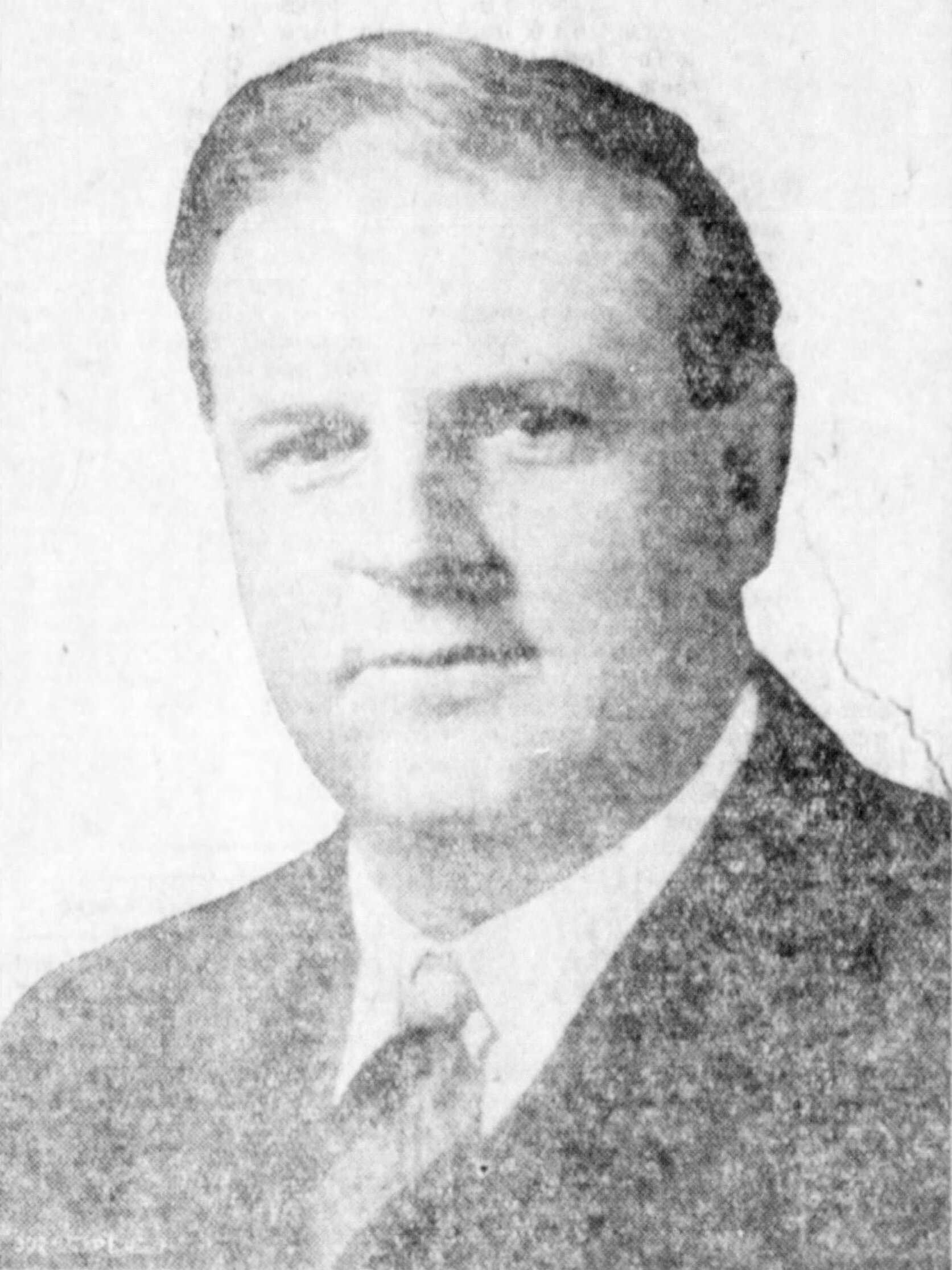
Nominee	Edward J. Hughes	William J. Stratton
Party	Democratic	Republican
Popular vote	2,120,071	1,576,939
Percentage	55.95%	41.62%
- County results Hughes: 40–50% 50–60% 60–70% Stratton: 50–60% 60–70%
Secretary of State before election
Edward J. Hughes
Democratic
Elected Secretary of State
Edward J. Hughes
Democratic

Incumbent first-term Democratic Secretary of State Edward J. Hughes, a Democrat, was reelected.

Hughes faced Republican former secretary of state William J. Stratton in a rematch of the 1932 race.

==== Democratic primary ====
Secretary of State Democratic primary
Party	Candidate	Votes	%
Democratic	Edward J. Hughes (incumbent)	1,027,919	84.79
Democratic	Joseph Andrew Lasecki	184,331	15.21
Total votes		1,212,250	100

==== Republican primary ====
Secretary of State Republican primary
Party	Candidate	Votes	%
Republican	William J. Stratton	632,451	72.22
Republican	John W. Kapp, Jr.	243,327	27.78
Total votes		875,778	100

==== General election ====
Secretary of State election
Party	Candidate	Votes	%
Democratic	Edward J. Hughes (incumbent)	2,120,071	55.95
Republican	William J. Stratton	1,576,939	41.62
Union Progressive	Stanley J. Piotrowicz	79,310	2.09
Socialist	Harry A. Crawford	7,553	0.20
Prohibition	Harriet L. McBride	3,123	0.08
Socialist Labor	Sam French	2,179	0.06
Total votes		3,789,175	100

=== Auditor of Public Accounts ===
1936 Illinois Auditor of Public Accounts election
- November 3, 1936
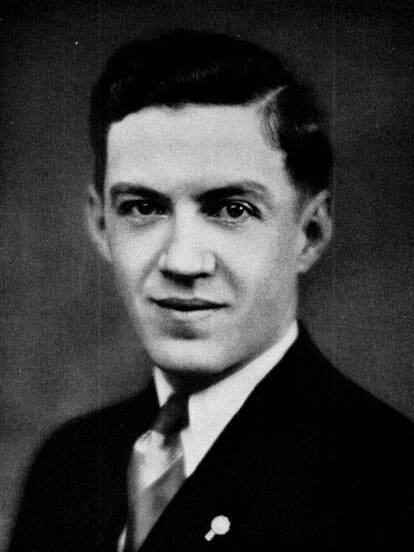

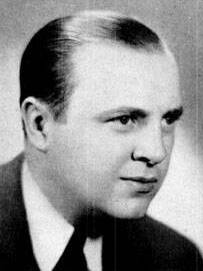
Nominee	Edward J. Barrett	Arthur J. Bidwill
Party	Democratic	Republican
Popular vote	2,107,911	1,561,920
Percentage	56.06%	41.54%
Auditor of Public Accounts before election
Edward J. Barrett
Democratic
Elected Auditor of Public Accounts
Edward J. Barrett
Democratic

Incumbent first-term Auditor of Public Accounts Edward J. Barrett, a Democrat, was reelected.

==== Democratic primary ====
Auditor of Public Accounts Democratic primary
Party	Candidate	Votes	%
Democratic	Edward J. Barrett (incumbent)	573,898	47.36
Democratic	Homer Mat Adams	397,490	32.80
Democratic	Thomas J. Barrett	173,954	14.36
Democratic	Stanley A. Besdon	66,416	5.48
Write-in		1	0.00
Total votes		1,211,759	100

==== Republican primary ====
State senator Arthur J. Bidwill won the Republican nomination, defeating, among others, fellow state senator Earle Benjamin Searcy.

===== Results =====
Auditor of Public Accounts Republican primary
Party	Candidate	Votes	%
Republican	Arthur J. Bidwill	253,329	30.98
Republican	Earle B. Searcy	215,697	26.38
Republican	E. E. Nicholson	114,943	14.06
Republican	Charles W. Vail	103,992	12.72
Republican	Amelia Laura Magee	51,222	6.27
Republican	Oscar George Lehr	48,379	5.92
Republican	Vandorf Gray	30,044	3.68
Total votes		817,606	100

==== General election ====
Auditor of Public Accounts election
Party	Candidate	Votes	%
Democratic	Edward J. Barrett (incumbent)	2,107,911	56.06
Republican	Arthur J. Bidwill	1,561,920	41.54
Union Progressive	Harry A. Steinmeyer	77,436	2.06
Socialist	Anton Udovic	7,607	0.20
Prohibition	Carl T . E. Schultze	3,115	0.08
Socialist Labor	Gus A. Jenning	2,416	0.06
Write-in		1	0.00
Total votes		3,760,406	100

=== Treasurer ===
1936 Illinois State Treasurer election
- November 3, 1936
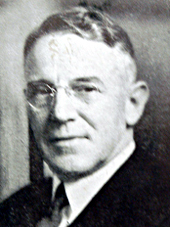

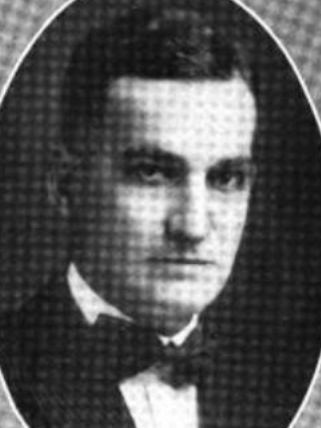
Nominee	John C. Martin	Clarence F. Buck
Party	Democratic	Republican
Popular vote	2,090,130	1,561,124
Percentage	55.86%	41.72%
Treasurer before election
John Henry Stelle
Democratic
Elected Treasurer
John C. Martin
Democratic

Incumbent first-term Treasurer John Henry Stelle, a Democrat, did not seek reelection, instead running for lieutenant governor. Democrat John C. Martin was elected to succeed him in office, granting Martin a second nonconsecutive term as Illinois Treasurer.

==== Democratic primary ====
Former Illinois Treasurer, John C. Martin, won the Democratic primary.

Treasurer Democratic primary
Party	Candidate	Votes	%
Democratic	John C. Martin	646,300	54.25
Democratic	Joseph T. Spiker	375,490	31.52
Democratic	Raymond J. Anderson	169,579	14.23
Total votes		1,191,369	100

==== Republican primary ====
Former Illinois state senator Clarence F. Buck won the Republican nomination defeating businessman Anton J. Johnson, former U.S. congressman and former Illinois Treasurer Edward E. Miller, among others.

Treasurer Republican primary
Party	Candidate	Votes	%
Republican	Clarence F. Buck	374,324	45.92
Republican	Anton J. Johnson	103,010	12.64
Republican	Edward E. Miller	101,519	12.45
Republican	Deneen A. Watson	84,534	10.37
Republican	Joseph L. Moore	82,577	10.13
Republican	Francis A. Horrigan	69,300	8.50
Total votes		815,264	100

==== General election ====
Treasurer election
Party	Candidate	Votes	%
Democratic	John C. Martin	2,090,130	55.86
Republican	Clarence F. Buck	1,561,124	41.72
Union Progressive	H. W. Trovillion	77,031	2.06
Socialist	Benjamin Williger	7,767	0.21
Prohibition	Enoch A. Holtwick	3,245	0.09
Socialist Labor	Frank H. McKinzie	2,433	0.07
Total votes		3,741,730	100

=== State Senate ===
Seats of the Illinois Senate were up for election in 1936. Democrats retained control of the chamber.

=== State House of Representatives ===
Seats in the Illinois House of Representatives were up for election in 1936. Democrats retained control of the chamber. Cumulative voting and 59 three-seat districts were used in this election. Members of both of the two main parties were elected in each district.

=== Trustees of University of Illinois ===
1936 Trustees of University of Illinois election
- November 3, 1936

An election was held for three of the nine seats for Trustees of University of Illinois to six year terms. Democrats swept all three seats.

All three incumbents whose terms were expiring (second-term Republican George A. Barr, first-term Republican Edward E. Barrett, and first-term Democrat Walter W. Winslow) were not nominated for reelection.

New Democratic members Homer Mat Adams, James Mansfield Cleary, and Louis C. Moschel were elected.

Trustees of the University of Illinois election
Party	Candidate	Votes	%
Democratic	Homer Mat Adams	2,048,328	18.44
Democratic	James Mansfield Cleary	2,047,680	18.43
Democratic	Louis C. Moschel	2,042,819	18.39
Republican	Frank H. McKelvey	1,566,214	14.10
Republican	Frank M. White	1,565,030	14.09
Republican	Charles S. Pillsbury	1,557,458	14.02
Union Progressive	Minnie Clarke Webster	79,468	0.72
Union Progressive	John L. Wellington	78,788	0.71
Union Progressive	Elsie B. Johnston	77,824	0.70
Socialist	Edward L. Adams, Jr.	8,813	0.08
Socialist	Roy E. Burt	8,648	0.08
Socialist	Georgia Albright	8,349	0.08
Prohibition	Mildred E. Young	3,666	0.03
Prohibition	Lawrence Britton	3,549	0.03
Prohibition	John Ashe	3,383	0.03
Socialist Labor	Nels C. Gustafson	2,731	0.03
Socialist Labor	Mary Starcevic	2,725	0.03
Socialist Labor	John L. Lindsey	2,631	0.02
Total votes		11,108,104	100

=== Judicial elections ===
==== Supreme Court ====
One seat on the Illinois Supreme Court had an election on June 1, 1936.

===== 5th district election =====
Republican Clyde E. Stone was reelected.

Illinois Supreme Court 5th district election
Party	Candidate	Votes	%
Republican	Clyde E. Stone (incumbent)	39,091	55.83
Democratic	Josef T. Skinner	30,922	44.17
Total votes		70,013	100

==== Circuit Courts ====
Several special elections were held November 3, 1936 for the Illinois Circuit Courts.

Robert J. Dunne was defeated John F. Tyrrell (1,157,312 votes to 709,625 votes) in a nonpartisan race to fill the vacancy left on the Circuit Court of Cook County by the resignation of fellow Democrat Francis S. Wilson.

Democratic nominee Grendel F. Bennett defeated Republican nominee V. W. McIntire (50,216 votes to 42,026 votes) to fill the 5th district vacancy left by the resignation of Craig Van Meter.

Democratic nominee Horace H. Baker defeated Republican nominee Lester H. Martin (43,987 votes to 43,877 votes) to fill the 11th district vacancy left by death of Peter Murphy.

Democratic nominee Francis J. Coyle defeated Republican nominee Albert M. Crampton (51,609 votes to 50,163 votes) to fill the 14th district vacancy left by death of J. Paul Califf.

Despite dying before the election, Republican nominee William J. Emerson defeated Democratic nominee James B. Sheean (38,712 votes to 30,184 votes) to fill the 15th district vacancy left by death of Frank T. Sheean.

== Local elections ==
Local elections were held.
