= 1936 Illinois gubernatorial election =

- November 3, 1936
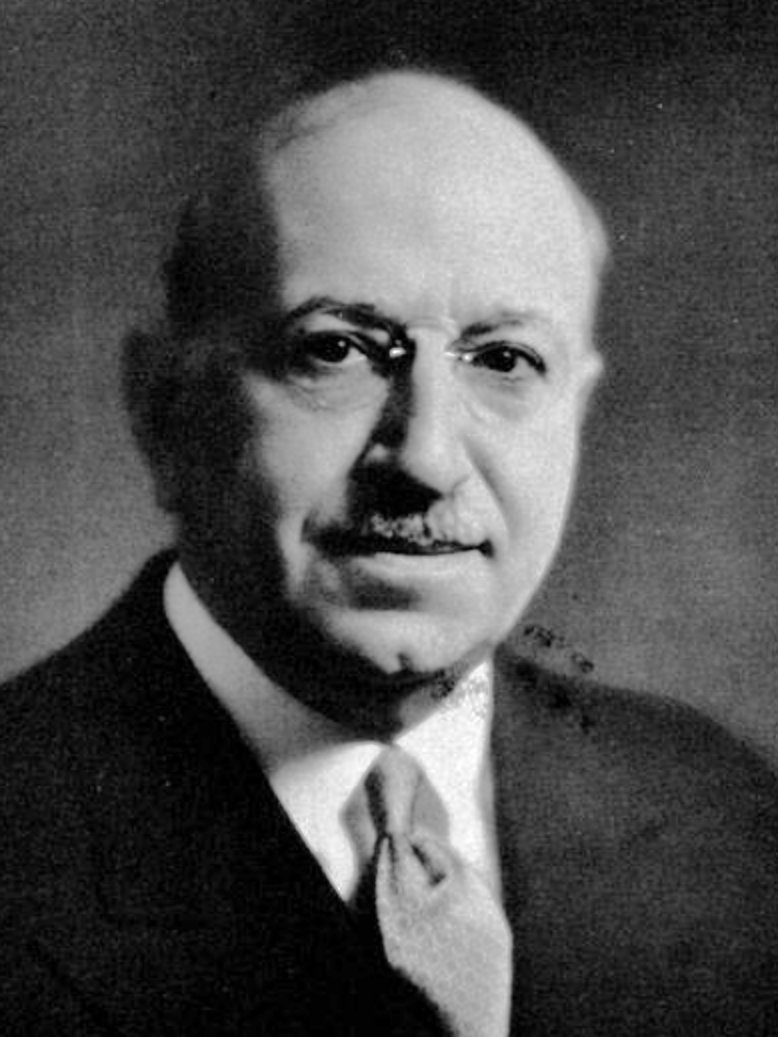

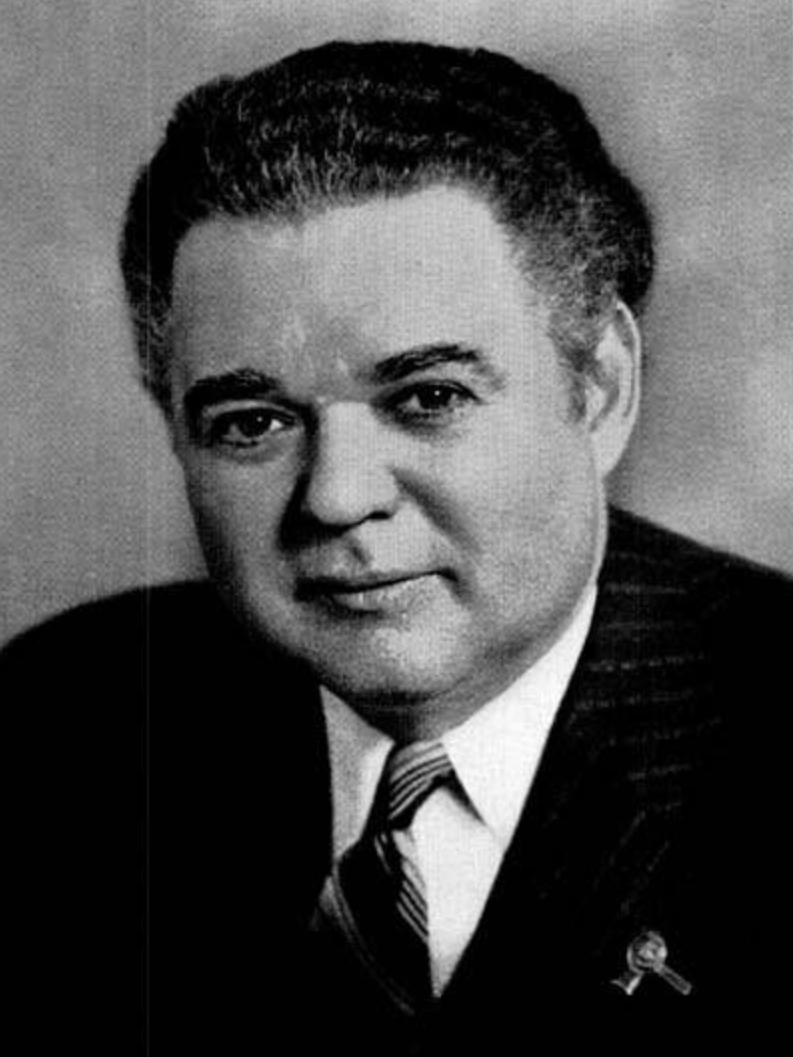
| Nominee | Henry Horner | C. Wayland Brooks |
| Party | Democratic | Republican |
| Popular vote | 2,067,861 | 1,682,685 |
| Percentage | 53.13% | 43.24% |
- County results Horner: 40–50% 50–60% 60–70% Brooks: 40–50% 50–60% 60–70%
Governor before election
Henry Horner
Democratic
Elected Governor
Henry Horner
Democratic

The 1936 Illinois gubernatorial election was held on November 3, 1936. Incumbent first-term governor Henry Horner, a Democrat, won reelection, defeating Republican nominee, future Senator C. Wayland Brooks with 53.13% of the vote.

== Democratic primary ==
The Chicago political machine unsuccessfully ran Chicago Board of Health president Herman Bundesen against the incumbent Henry Horner in retribution for Horner having vetoed a bill that would have allowed bookies to legally operate, a bill favored by Chicago political bosses such as Edward J. Kelly.

=== Candidates ===
- Herman Bundesen, Chicago Board of Health president and Chicago health commissioner, former Cook County coroner
- Henry Horner, incumbent governor
- James Fred Robertson, 1934 U.S. congress candidate and 1935 Chicago mayoral candidate

=== Results ===
Democratic gubernatorial primary
| Party | Candidate | Votes | % |
|---|---|---|---|
| Democratic | Henry Horner (incumbent) | 820,313 | 54.39 |
| Democratic | Herman Bundesen | 659,221 | 43.71 |
| Democratic | James Fred Robertson | 28,600 | 1.90 |
| Write-in | Others | 1 | 0.00 |
| Total votes | | 1,508,135 | 100 |

== Republican primary ==
=== Candidates ===
- C. Wayland Brooks
- Oscar E. Carlstrom, former Illinois attorney general
- George W. Dowell, Progressive nominee for Illinois's 25th congressional district in 1914
- Thomas P. Gunning, Illinois state senator
- J. Paul Kuhn
- John G. Oglesby, former lieutenant governor of Illinois (publicly withdrew before primary)
- Len Small, former governor of Illinois

=== Results ===
Republican gubernatorial primary
| Party | Candidate | Votes | % |
|---|---|---|---|
| Republican | C. Wayland Brooks | 596,446 | 59.05 |
| Republican | Len Small | 268,903 | 26.62 |
| Republican | Oscar E. Carlstrom | 53,266 | 5.27 |
| Republican | Thomas P. Gunning | 31,194 | 3.09 |
| Republican | J. Paul Kuhn | 29,423 | 2.91 |
| Republican | H. Wallace Caldwell | 16,079 | 1.59 |
| Republican | John G. Oglesby | 7,568 | 0.75 |
| Republican | George W. Dowell | 7,125 | 0.71 |
| Write-in | Others | 1 | 0.00 |
| Total votes | | 1,010,005 | 100 |

== General election ==
Challenging both Democratic nominee Henry Horner and Republican nominee Charles W. Brooks, Republican former Chicago mayor William Hale Thompson ran on the Union Progressive Party of Illinois' ballot line. There were also several other minor candidates.

Gubernatorial election
| Party | Candidate | Votes | % |
|---|---|---|---|
| Democratic | Henry Horner (incumbent) | 2,067,861 | 53.13% |
| Republican | C. Wayland Brooks | 1,682,685 | 43.24% |
| Union Progressive | William Hale Thompson | 128,962 | 3.31% |
| Socialist | John Fisher | 6,966 | 0.18% |
| Prohibition | Harmon W. Reed | 2,896 | 0.07% |
| Socialist Labor | O. Alfred Olson | 2,602 | 0.07% |
| Write-in | Others | 4 | 0.00% |
| Total votes | | 3,891,976 | 100% |
