= William D. Meyering =

American politician

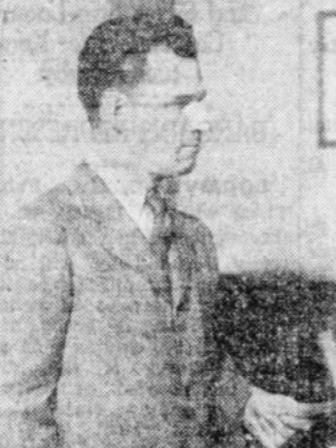
- Meyering in 1925

Chief Probation Officer of Cook County
- In office February 1, 1936 – 1972
- Preceded by: John W. Houston
- Succeeded by: Ben S. Meeker

Cook County Sheriff
- In office December 1930 – December 1934
- Preceded by: John E. Traeger
- Succeeded by: John Toman

Chicago Alderman from the 8th ward
- In office April 1923 – December 1930
- Preceded by: Martin S. Furman and Ross A. Woodhull
- Succeeded by: David L. Sutton

Personal details
- Died: June 25, 1976 (aged 83) Oak Lawn, Illinois, U.S.
- Party: Democratic

Military service
- Branch/service: United States Army
- Battles/wars: World War I
- Awards: Distinguished Service Cross; Croix de Guerre

William D. Meyering was an American politician who served as Cook County sheriff, Chicago alderman, and chief probation officer of Cook County.

He was well-decorated for his service in the American Expeditionary Forces during World War I.

== Service during World War I ==
Meyering was well-decorated for his service during World War I.

Meyering graduated from the Fort Sheridan training camp.

Meyering had his right hand amputated during his service in France. This happened on April 6, 1918, when he was seriously wounded under fire at Verdun, with a hand grenade gravely harming it. At the time, he was a first lieutenant in charge of his company (Company E) in the 23rd Infantry Regiment, which was part of the 2nd Infantry Division. Despite being seriously wounded, he remained in command throughout the barrage from attacking German forces.

Meyering was the first living American, and the first member of the American Expeditionary Forces, to be awarded the Distinguished Service Cross, which he received on May 30, 1918. He was only the fourth overall individual to be awarded the honor. General John J. Pershing had recommended him for the honor. He also received a Croix de Guerre from the French.

General Pershing would elevate Meyering to the rank of captain, and had him work at headquarters.

== Private sector career ==
Meyering worked as an insurance salesman. In 1923, Meyering launched his own real estate and insurance company. In 1928, as a joint venture with David L. Sutton, Meyering constructed what is now known as a Four Nineteen Building as a service station.

== Political and government career ==
=== Chicago City Council ===
In 1923, Meyering was elected to the Chicago City Council as the alderman for the city's 8th ward. He ran as a self-identified Democrat, and was endorsed by the Municipal Voters League.

While serving on the Chicago City Council, he would, in 1926, be elected the president of the Second Division Association of Illinois, which had membership of more than 3,000 veterans. He held his leadership of this organization while remaining on the City Council.

In 1927, when Meyering was running for reelection to his third term on the City Council, the Municipal Voters League wrote of him, "finishing second term with a fairly good record. Supported progressive measures...Has been active in tending to the interests of his wad and maintaining there the spirit of the zoning ordinance, as well as keeping his section free from vice." The Municipal Voters League credited him giving strong attention to work on resolving issues related to straightening the Chicago River. They also credited him, as chairman of a transportation subcommittee, for doing valuable work in addressing the city's "traction question".

Meyering was an opponent of Republican Mayor William Hale Thompson's ouster of Superintendent of Chicago Public Schools William McAndrew. Meyering would also regularly oppose projects which Thompson advocated for.

In 1928, Meyering was the Democratic Party nominee for Illinois secretary of state. Meyering was defeated by Republican nominee William J. Stratton.

Meyering won reelection to a fourth term in 1929 with an outright majority in the first round. This strong performance came despite strong backing for his top opponent by the Civic Safety Commission.

In March 1929, Meyering gave his support to the proposal of constructing a harbor at Lake Calumet.

Meyering resigned from the City Council in late 1930 in order to assume the office of Cook County sheriff.

In the 1931 election to fill his former city council seat, Meyering backed his business colleague David L. Sutton, who also received the backing of ward committeeman James J. Sullivan the majority of the local Democratic organization. Sutton won election in a runoff election, defeating a candidate with ties to William Hale Thompson.

=== Cook County Sheriff ===
Meyering was elected Cook County sheriff in 1930, a leading vote-getter in a Democratic sweep of countywide offices.

On July 24, 1933, policeman John G. Sevick was shot to death by the John Scheck at the Cook County Courthouse, to whom a pistol had managed to be smuggled while he was in the custody of the Cook County Sheriff's Office. After this, the Chicago Tribune called for the removal or resignation on Meyering as sheriff.

In 1934, deputy sheriffs that Meyering had ordered to inspect the Century of Progress world's fair stopped two concession performances and arrested four performers for charges relating to obscenity and indecency.

=== Chief Probation Officer of Cook County ===
In 1936, Meyering was appointed chief probation officer of Cook County, having purview in the Circuit Court of Cook County, Superior Court of Cook County, and the Municipal Court of Chicago, taking office on February 1, 1936. He was appointed by a joint committee of judges of these courts to fill the vacancy left by the resignation of John W. Houston Meyering's appointment was met with controversy. It received opposition from Frank J. Loesch, president of the Chicago Crime Commission, as well as a number of judges and court attachés.

Meyering held the office until retiring in 1972.

== Death ==
Meyering died June 25, 1976, at the age of 83 at the Monticello Convalescent Center in Oak Lawn, Illinois. He was survived by his widow Marie, three sons, two daughters, a sister, and 34 grandchildren.

== Legacy ==
In 1926, the city of Chicago created Meyering Park, named in his honor.

Party political offices
Preceded by Andrew Olson	Democratic nominee for Secretary of State of Illinois; 1928	Succeeded by Edward J. Hughes
