= Jennie Barmore =

Asymptomatic carrier of typhoid in Chicago

Jennie Barmore (popularly known as "Typhoid Jennie") was the operator of a boarding house in Chicago from 1910 until about 1920 who was placed under an involuntary quarantine by the Chicago Health Commission in 1919 after being deemed an asymptomatic carrier of typhoid. Barmore, represented by attorney Clarence Darrow, challenged the forced quarantine in court unsuccessfully. She subsequently moved to Oklahoma.

== Opening of boarding house ==
In 1910, Barmore opened a boarding house in Chicago. Barmore's husband George had been severely disabled after an accident and was unable to work, making the operation of the boarding house their sole source of income. Barmore cooked meals for the boarding house's residents.

== Contact tracing ==
In November 1919, through the use of contact tracing, Chicago Health Commissioner John Dill Robertson found that five cases of typhoid had originated at the boarding house that Barmore operated in the city. At least five individuals hospitalized for typhoid had listed the boarding house as their place of residence. One of these individuals would ultimately die from typhoid. In July 1919, Barmore's adult son David had also contracted typhoid after visiting his parents.

Robertson acted to close the boarding house, ordering its boarders to move out. Since Barmore prepared the food consumed by boarders, she was tested for typhoid. Three samples collected from her tested positive. She was ordered to cease cooking for others and to cease taking in boarders. Barmore, at the time 65 years of age, refused to cease operating her boarding house, arguing that it was her household's sole source of income. On December 15, Jennie was taken away from the boarding house and brought to Cook County Hospital by an armed health official and three police officers. This time, she was again tested for typhoid, but the tests came back negative and she was released from the hospital.

== Involuntary quarantine ==
The Chicago Health Commission insisted that Barmore was an asymptomatic carrier. Barmore was placed under a strict quarantine in her residence. Health officials placed signage at the front of the boarding house declaring the presence of typhoid at the boarding house, mandating that nobody could enter without the approval of the Chicago Health Commission, and warning the milkman to refrain from collecting any empty milk bottles from the building. Barmore was quarantined inside and prohibited from shopping, using public restrooms, and from preparing food for anyone but her husband and herself (including being prohibited from preparing food for her adult children if they were to visit her).

Barmore caught national attention, with her situation coming on the heels of that of "Typhoid Mary" in New York City that had been national news years prior. Barmore was similarly dubbed "Typhoid Jennie".

=== Litigation ===
The American Medical Liberty League, a Chicago-based antivaccine organization, was supportive of Barmore's cause. They announced that they planned to file a lawsuit with Barmore, and noted lawyer Clarence Darrow agreed to represent them. The case was heard in the Superior Court of Cook County, with a judge ruling in November 1920 that Barmore was a public health threat and that her quarantine was needed.

With Darrow still representing her, in June 1921 Barmore petitioned the Supreme Court of Illinois for a writ of habeas corpus to declare that Robertson and Chicago Health Commission epidemiologist Herman Bundesen were unlawfully restraining her liberty by preventing her from leaving her home amid suspicions that she was a carrier of typhoid. Her petition was denied in April 1922. The court found Barmore to be a health concern, and permitted health officials to hold her in quarantine for as long as they deemed it to be necessary. However, the case's holding greatly weakened the authority of the health commissioner of Chicago. The court found that the health commissioner lacked much authority, since the city had no board of health (as authorized by the state), but instead had itself established a Department of Health. The court decided that the Chicago City Council had no authority to delegate to the Department of Health authority equivalent to what the state would allow them to grant a board of health. Consequently, the top health official of Chicago would have weakened authority until a board of health was created in Chicago in 1932.

== Later life ==
Sometime following their court loss, Barmore and her husband left Chicago and moved to Oklahoma. Barmore died in 1940.

== See also ==
- Mary Mallon
- Superspreader
- Gaëtan Dugas
