= Edward J. Hughes =

American politician (1888–1944)

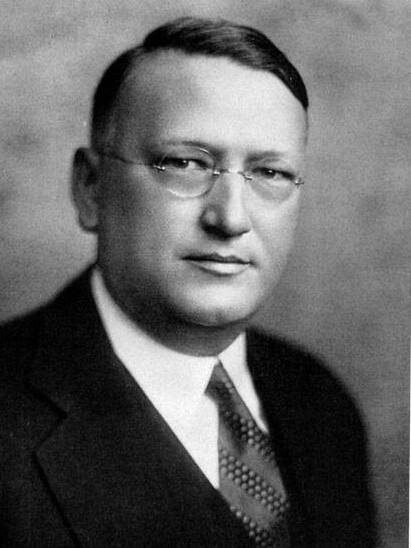
Official portrait, 1933

Edward J. Hughes (July 26, 1888 – June 28, 1944) was an American politician.

== Biography ==
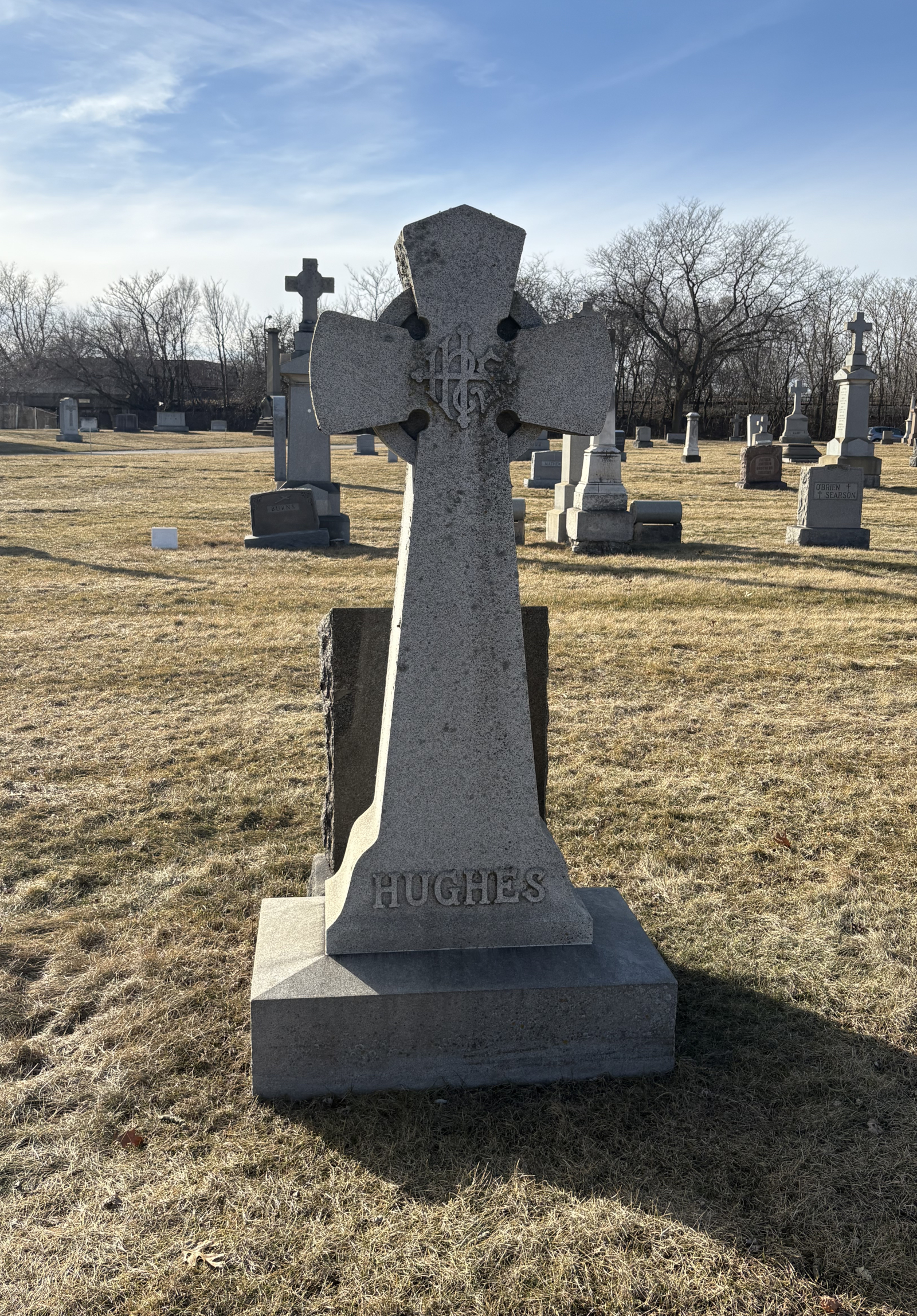
Hughes's grave at Calvary Cemetery

Born Michael Edward Hughes in Chicago, Illinois, to Peter J. Hughes (c. 1857 – 1933) and Mary Hughes (née Lawless, 1863 – 1919), both originally of Ireland. Hughes first studied law and then switched to engineering. Hughes served in the Illinois State Senate from 1914 to 1930 as a Democrat. In 1932, Hughes was elected Illinois Secretary of State and served until his death. Hughes died of a heart attack on June 28, 1944, while staying at the Waldorf Astoria Hotel in New York City. He was buried at Calvary Cemetery in Evanston.

Party political offices
Preceded by James J. Brady	Democratic nominee for Illinois Auditor of Public Accounts; 1924	Succeeded by George F. Sehring
Preceded by William D. Meyering	Democratic nominee for Secretary of State of Illinois; 1932, 1936, 1940	Succeeded by Edward J. Barrett
Political offices
Preceded by William J. Stratton	Secretary of State of Illinois; 1933–1944	Succeeded by Richard Yates Rowe
