= Clarence F. Buck =

American politician

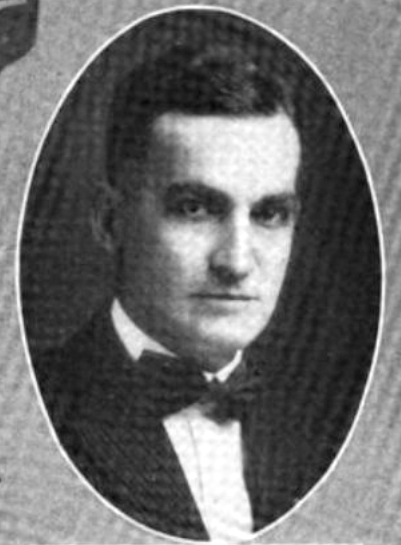

Member of the Illinois Senate
- In office 1918–1926

Personal details
- Born: Clarence Frank Buck; June 6, 1870 Monmouth, Illinois
- Died: September 2, 1944 (aged 74) Monmouth, Illinois
- Party: Republican
- Education: Monmouth College (BA)
- Occupation: Farmer, businessman, politician, newspaper editor

Clarence Frank Buck (June 6, 1870 – September 2, 1944) was an American politician, newspaper editor, businessman, and farmer.

== Biography ==
Buck was born in Monmouth, Illinois. He graduated from Monmouth College. He was a farmer and raised livestock. Buck served as editor of the Monmouth Daily Atlas newspaper. Buck was involved with the Republican Party and served as postmaster of Monmouth. He was also involved with the banking business. Buck served in the Illinois Senate from 1919 to 1925.

Buck died at his home in Monmouth, Illinois.

Party political offices
Preceded by Omer N. Custer	Republican nominee for Illinois Treasurer; 1930	Succeeded by Charles W. Brooks
Preceded by William J. Stratton	Republican nominee for Illinois Treasurer; 1936	Succeeded by William R. McCauley
