= Charles M. Higgins =

American manufacturer and anti-vaccinationist (1854–1929)

Charles Michael Higgins
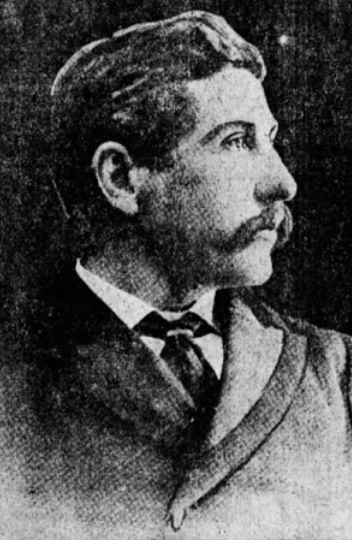
- Born: October 4, 1854; County Leitrim
- Died: October 21, 1929 (aged 75); Prospect Park (Brooklyn)
- Occupation(s): Ink manufacturer, writer

Charles Michael Higgins (October 4, 1854 – October 21, 1929) was an Irish-American ink manufacturer and anti-vaccinationist.

== Biography ==
Higgins was born in County Leitrim, Ireland. He moved to Brooklyn at the age of six. Higgins was the inventor of Higgins American India Ink. He operated the Charles M. Higgins Company to manufacture the drawing ink he invented.

Higgins married Alexandra Fransioli in 1899 and they had three children. He was a founding member of the Kings County Historical Society. He opposed vaccination and was also an anti-vivisectionist.

== Anti-Vaccination League of America ==
Higgins was the co-founder and treasurer of the Anti-Vaccination League of America. The League was created in 1908 by Higgins and industrialist John Pitcairn. Its anti-vaccination campaigns focused on New York and Pennsylvania. Members were opposed to compulsory vaccination laws. Higgins was the League's chief spokesman and pamphleteer. Historian James Colgrove noted that Higgins "attempted to overturn the New York State's law mandating vaccination of students in public schools." The League should not be confused with the Anti-Vaccination Society of America, that was formed in 1879.

Higgins was criticized by medical experts for spreading misinformation and ignoring facts as to the efficacy of vaccination. The League dissolved after the death of Higgins in 1929.

== Selected publications ==
- A Plea for Justice to China (1900)
- The Crime Against the School Child (1915)
- Brooklyn and Gowanus in History (1916)
- Vaccination and Lockjaw (1916)
- Unalienable Rights and Prohibition Wrongs (1919)
- Horrors of Vaccination Exposed and Illustrated (1920)

== See also ==
- American Medical Liberty League
