= Four Nineteen Building =

- U.S. National Register of Historic Places
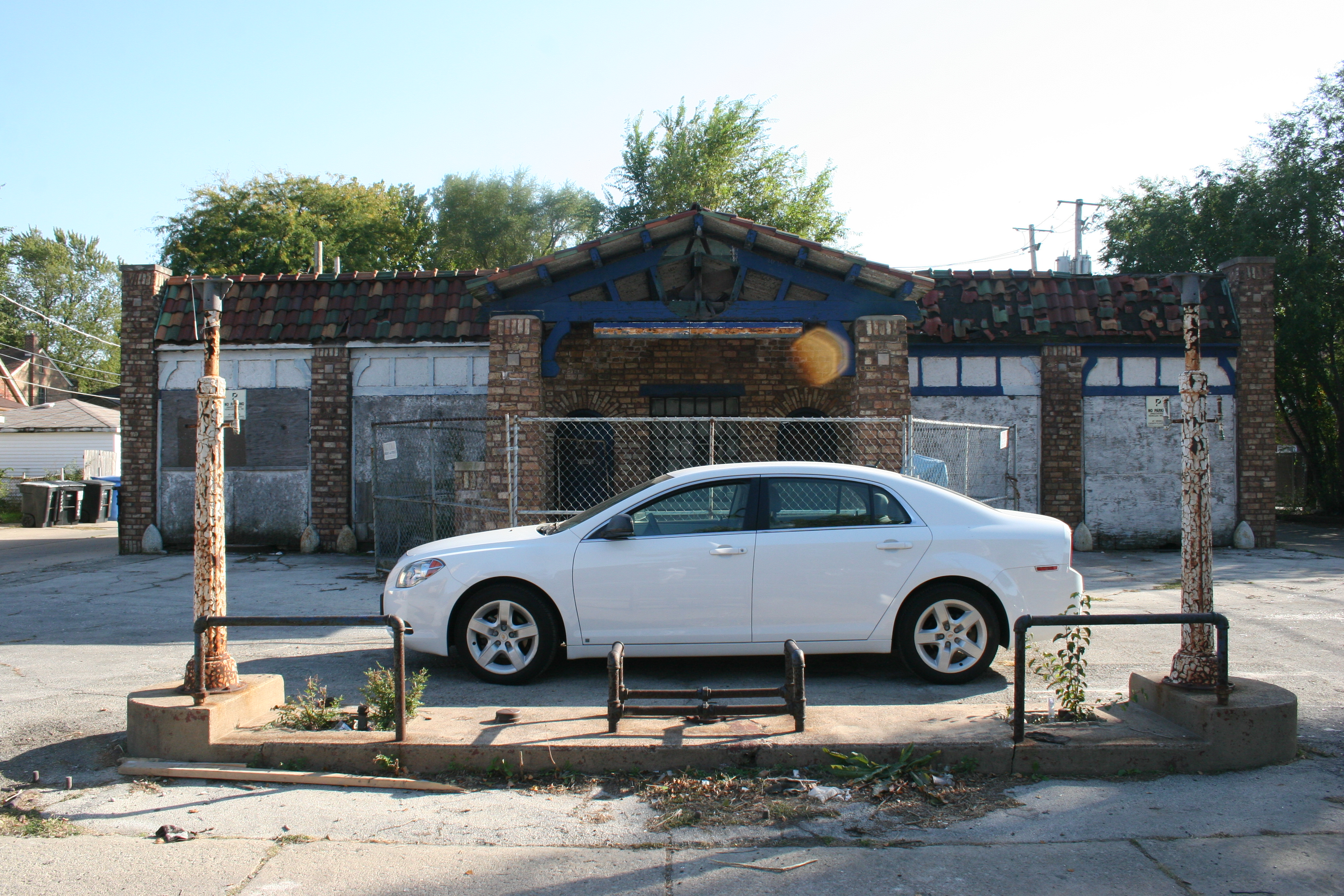

- Location within Chicago metropolitan area Location within Illinois Location within the United States
- Location: 419 E. 83rd St., Chicago, Illinois
- Coordinates: 41°44′37″N 87°36′50″W
- Area: less than one acre
- Built: 1928
- Architectural style: gas station with canopy and bays
- NRHP reference No.: 99000973
- Added to NRHP: August 12, 1999

The Four Nineteen Building is a historic gas station building located at 419 E. 83rd St. in the Chatham community area of Chicago, Illinois. The station was built in 1928 by William D. Meyering and David L. Sutton, two local real estate businessmen. The station is an example of the Domestic style of gas station architecture, in which stations were designed to resemble small houses. A wooden canopy supported by brick piers covers the building's front entrance and two garage bays extend from either side, making the station part of a subtype of the Domestic style appropriately named "House with Canopy and Bays". The station's walls are built with clinker bricks laid in a skintled pattern, a combination of two Chicago construction innovations. Clinker bricks were heated at higher temperatures than standard bricks, making them swollen, dense, and differently colored; the bricks were generally discarded until the 1920s, when Chicago architects began to build with them. The skintled pattern of brickwork consisted of rough and irregular bricklaying in which bricks stuck out of and into the wall at different angles. The building's parapet roof is tiled with multicolored Ludowici clay tiles, which were thought to pair well with skintled walls by architects of the era. Gas stations constructed from the 1930s onward generally had more functional designs, and as of 1999, the Four Nineteen Building was one of only sixteen Domestic-style gas stations remaining in Chicago and one of three with both a canopy and bays.

The building was added to the National Register of Historic Places on August 12, 1999.
