= Eli Jones =

American herbalist (1850–1933)

Eli Jones (1850–1933) was an American medical doctor who claimed to be able to treat cancer.

== Life ==
Jones studied conventional medicine and practiced for five years before deciding that the medicine of the day was harmful, because of its dependence upon harsh cathartics like calomel. He then turned to eclectic medicine, which relied upon herbal extracts including those of the Native Americans, went back to school, graduated, and practiced eclectic medicine for another five years. He decided to learn homeopathy, went back to school, and then practiced as a homeopath. He next turned to Physiomedicalism and, after studying, practiced that for another five years. And finally, he studied Dr. Willhelm Heinrich Schüssler's biochemical cell salts, which is similar to homeopathy, but relies upon salts found in the body and practiced that. After his forays into the various medical schools of his time, Jones developed a syncretic practice using all the schools he had learned. He tended to use a low dosage herbal tinctures or homeopathic mother tinctures in high doses. His Definite Medication proposed low dosage herbal extracts and engendered opposition from non-homeopaths.

== Works ==
Jones wrote Cancer – Its Causes, Symptoms and Treatment – Giving the Results of over Forty Years' Experience in the Medical Treatment of this Disease, and Definite Medication. He also published A Journal of Therapeutic Facts for the Busy Doctor, which gave doctors the pro and con experience of various treatments. The 1912 and 1913 issues have been transcribed by David Winston.

== See also ==
- American Medical Liberty League
