= Albert M. Crampton =

American judge

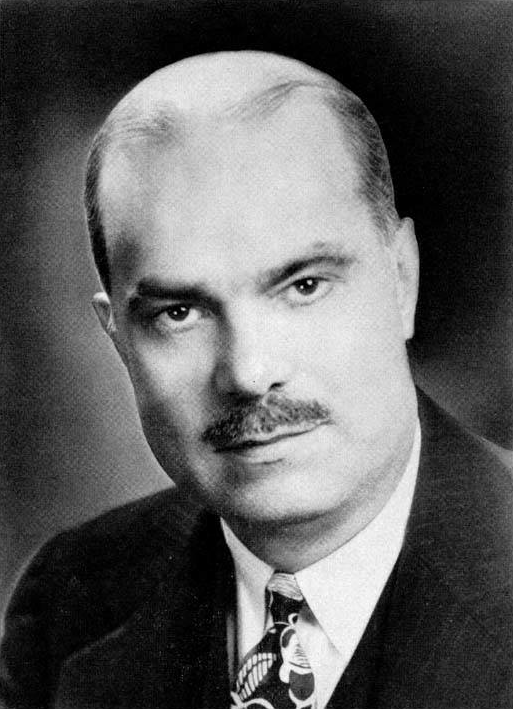
Crampton's official photograph, c. 1949.

Albert M. Crampton (January 7, 1900 – March 13, 1953) was an American jurist.

Born in Moline, Illinois, Crampton graduated from Moline High School. Crampton received his law degree from Cornell Law School in 1922 and was admitted to the Illinois bar in 1923. He also studied law at Harvard Law School and University of Wisconsin Law School. Crampton practiced law in Moline and served as Moline City Court judge. From 1944 to 1947, Crampton served on the Illinois Board of Education and was a Republican. Crampton served on the Illinois Supreme Court from 1948 until his death in 1953. Crampton served as chief justice of the court. Crampton died in a hospital in Springfield, Illinois following a heart attack while presiding over the supreme court.
