= George W. Dowell =

American lawyer

George W. Dowell was an American attorney and political candidate. He was born August 18, 1879, in Williamson County, Illinois.

== Career ==
In his early life, Dowell worked as a miner in Elkville, Illinois. He later became an attorney who practiced law in Du Quoin, Illinois. Along with William Lafont, he founded the village of Dowell, IL. They requested bids for property development as early as 1917. In February, 1920, the Dowell State Bank was opened in the town. Town founders George Dowell and William Lafont were among the first directors of the bank.

He later served as the general counsel for the Progressive Miners of America.

=== Political career ===
Dowell ran unsuccessfully for the Republican nomination to the U.S. Senate in 1936. He unsuccessfully for nomination for the same office in 1938.
