= Herman Bundesen =

American politician (1882–1960)

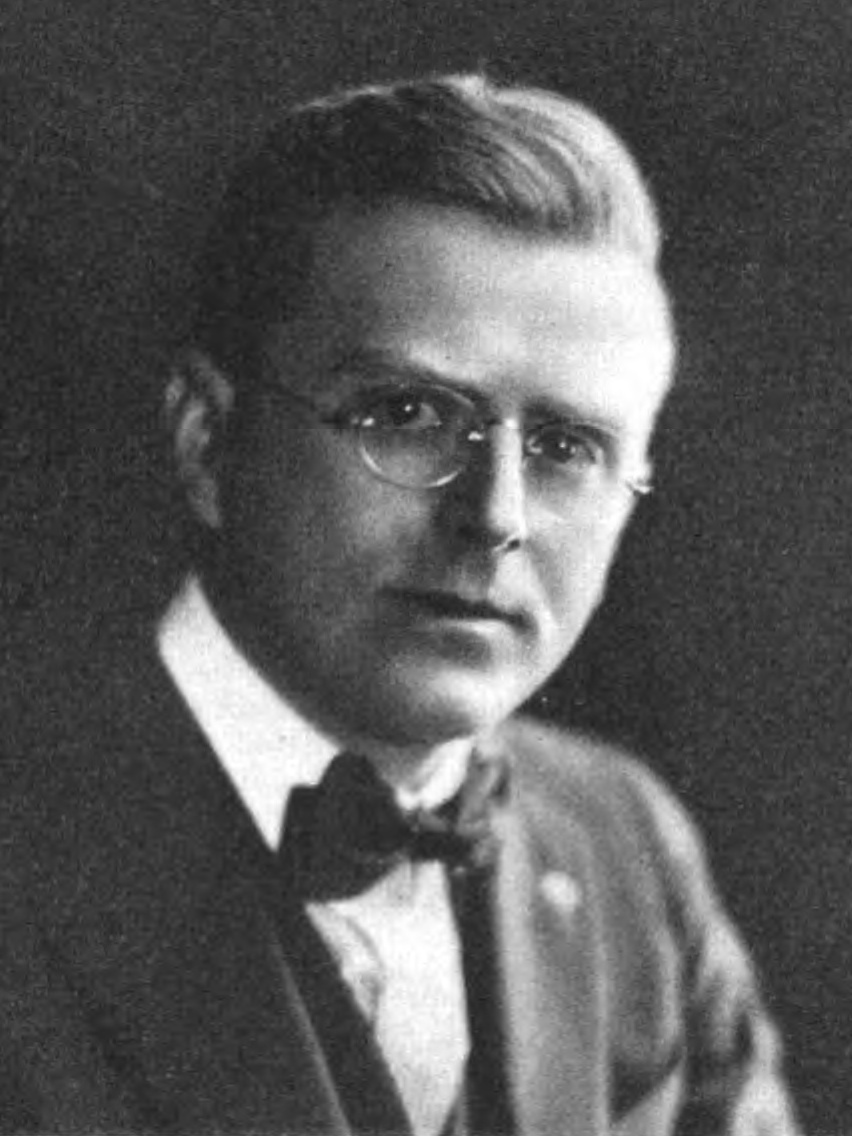
- Bundesen, circa 1925

President of the Chicago Board of Health
- In office 1932 – August 25, 1960
- Mayor: Anton Cermak; Frank J. Corr (acting); Edward J. Kelly; Martin H. Kennelly; Richard J. Daley
- Preceded by: office established
- Succeeded by: Eric Oldberg

Chicago Health Commissioner
- In office 1931 – April 1960
- Mayor: Anton Cermak; Frank J. Corr (acting); Edward J. Kelly; Martin H. Kennelly; Richard J. Daley
- Preceded by: Arnold H. Kegel
- Succeeded by: Samuel Andelman
- In office February 1, 1922 – January 1928
- Mayor: William Emmett Dever; William Hale Thompson
- Preceded by: John Dill Robertson
- Succeeded by: Arnold H. Kegel

Cook County Coroner
- In office December 1928 – November 18, 1931
- Preceded by: Oscar Wolff
- Succeeded by: Frank J. Walsh

Personal details
- Born: April 27, 1882 Berlin, Germany
- Died: August 25, 1960 (aged 78) Chicago, Illinois
- Party: Democratic
- Spouse: Rega Russell
- Children: 6
- Education: Northwestern University

Military service
- Branch/service: United States Army
- Battles/wars: World War I

Herman Niels Bundesen (April 27, 1882 – August 25, 1960) was a German-American medical professional, politician, and author. He served two tenures as the chief health official of the city of Chicago, holding this role for more than 34 years in total. He also was elected Cook County coroner. In 1936, he ran unsuccessfully for the Democratic Party nomination for governor of Illinois.

Bundensen was respected in the field of public health. He noted not only for his experience and expertise, but also for his flamboyance. He was perceived to be someone who desired celebrity, often taking advantage of photo ops.

In addition to his tenure as Cook County Coroner and his long service as Chicago's top health official, Bundensen also served as president of the American Public Health Association and as a senior surgeon with the United States Public Health Service.

== Early life ==
Herman Neils Bundesen was born on April 27, 1882, in Berlin, Germany. He was born to a Danish father and German mother. He was brought to Chicago at a young age by his widowed mother.

Bundensen graduated in 1909 from Northwestern University Medical School. During World War I, he served in the United States Army.

== Career ==
After the war, he returned to Chicago to practice medicine.

In 1914, Bundensen came to work for the Chicago Health Department as an epidemiologist. He was working for the health department during the time the Spanish Flu Pandemic impacted the city in 1918, playing a role in securing flu vaccine for the city. A 1921 Chicago Tribune article reported that, while in this role, an incident had occurred in which he happened upon a crew dumping trash into Lake Michigan and ordered them to stop. Instead of listening, a worker pulled out a pickaxe, in response to which Bundensen produced a pistol, which persuaded the pickaxe-wielding worker to flee.

Bundensen played a role in fighting a local epidemic of typhoid. Litigation was brought in 1921, raised by Jennie Barmore. While upholding a forced-quarantine imposed by Bundensen and Robertson on Barmore for being an asymptomatic carrier of typhoid in its April 1922 ruling, Clarence Darrow had been the lawyer representing Barmore. the Supreme Court of Illinois also found that the health commissioner lacked much authority, since the city had no board of health (as authorized by the state), but instead had itself established a Department of Health. The court decided that the Chicago City Council had no authority to delegate to the Department of Health authority equivalent to what the state would allow them to grant a board of health. This legal decision had the consequence of greatly weakening the legal authority of the Commissioner of Health of Chicago. The top health official of Chicago would have weakened authority until the Chicago City Council passed an ordinance establishing a board of health on May 4, 1932.

=== First tenure as Chicago City Health Commissioner ===
Bundensen was appointed as Health Commissioner of Chicago on February 1, 1922, after John Dill Robertson tendered his resignation. He had been appointed because of his efforts in combatting the typhoid epidemic.

A 1928 editorial in the American Journal of Public Health observed of Bundensen's first tenure as city health commissioner, "[Bundensen] surrounded himself [with] a group of unusually efficient men…every department in his office was headed by an expert…the entire health department [was] a model in organization as well as accomplishment."

Early into his tenure, Bundensen declared a battle against sexually transmitted disease, controversially advocating for city-funded venereal disease clinics and municipal distribution of prophylactics, and even making them available in brothels. Chicago newspapers and medical journals criticized this, arguing that it promoted "immoral" behavior.

Bundensen opposed the opening of the Illinois Birth Control League's first birth control clinic in 1923, which was operated by Rachelle Yarros, and largely provided wedded women with diaphragms prescribed by doctors.

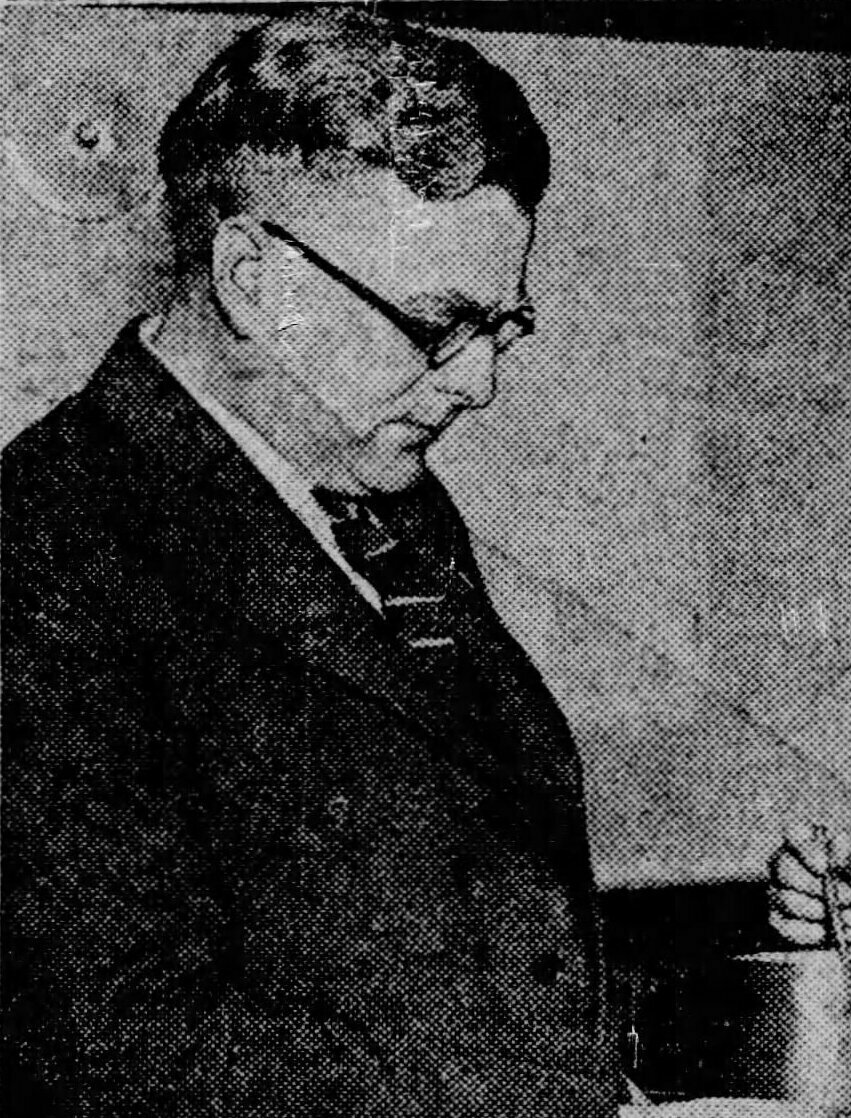
Bundesen in 1924

Early into his tenure, Bundensen was informed of a child abuser impersonating a dentist and going to public schools claiming to have been sent to examine children. He tracked the imposter to a rooming house, where a woman told him that the man was out. He threatened to arrest the woman in his place, after which she admitted the abuser was hiding in a closet. The Chicago Tribune reported the story under the headline "Dr. Bundesen Nabs Moron Who Hoaxed School".

Bundensen launched an infant welfare program, emphasizing parental education. This was responsible for a drastic decrease in infant mortality in Chicago. The city also saw a decrease in maternal mortality. He was also successful in his efforts to decrease the city's rates of diphtheria.

Bundensen made milk inspection a priority. in December 1925, at his urging, the Chicago City Council defied the 1911 ban by the state government of Illinois on tuberculin testing of cattle. In 1926, he had persuaded Illinois dairy farmers to destroy diseased cows, and convinced milk processors to improve their equipment for pasteurizing. He also increased the enforcement of pasteurization laws. In the year 1928, the health department conducted 56,127 dairy farm inspections, a more than thirteen-fold increase from the number they had conducted in the year 1920. His work on milk safety earned him the Lawson Prize.

During his time in office, he acquired celebrity, often taking photo ops. He received much attention for numerous relief efforts he participated in. For instance, he was photographed handing bottles of milk from a railroad boxcar to children during a relief expedition Chicago sent to Miami after the 1926 Miami hurricane. Other relief efforts he participated in included relief efforts to address the Tri-State tornado outbreak and the Great Mississippi Flood of 1927 Taking credit for his work as health commissioner, Bundensen would often in interviews and appearances call himself the, "savior of babies, friend of mothers, and builder of public health.

Bundesen wrote baby books which became widely sold in the 1920s and 1930s. The Board of Health would also mail free copies to new mothers they identified from the city's birth records.

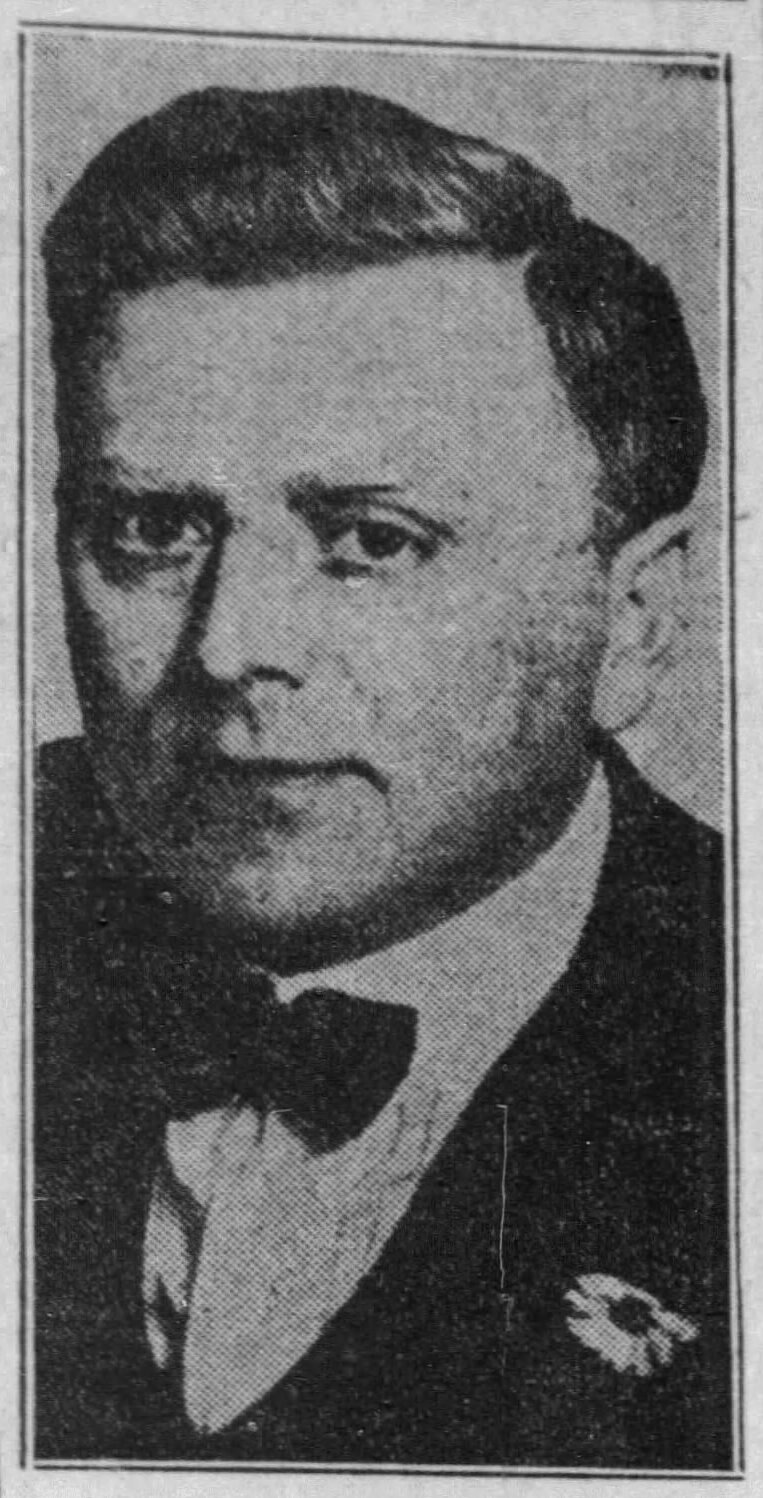
Bundesen, circa 1927

In 1927, members of the Chicago Sanitary District board accused Bundesen of having spent $248,000 of health department funds "mostly for publicity".

Bundensen became well known, particularly for his efforts related to milk. He received many national recognitions, enjoyed wide respect from the Chicago medical community, and was elected the President of the American Public Health Association. Northwestern University, his alma mater, awarded him an honorary degree in recognition of his work as a public health official.

At the start of 1928, Mayor of Chicago William Hale Thompson fired Bundesen after he had refused to add the mayor's campaign literature to packets containing maternity health advice that were disseminated by his office. The firing soon after garner a vote of approval in the Chicago City Council. An editorial in the American Journal of Public Health published soon after noted,

It has been a long time since anything has occurred which has so shocked the public health officers of the United States, or done so much to upset the morale of those engaged in health work, as the dismissal of Dr. Herman N. Bundesen as Health Commissioner of Chicago. Some suspected that this would occur soon after the election of Mayor Thompson [in early 1927], but as the months went by, everyone felt that [Thompson] had recognized the fitness of things by retaining a health officer who has been distinguished by his beneficent activities.

=== Health director of the Chicago Sanitary District ===
Bundensen worked briefly as the health director of the Chicago Sanitary District. Bundensen had entered discussion with the Sanity Board's president, T. J. Crowe, in late 1927 about holding such a position. In this position, Bundensen was involved in talks between the district and Chicago steel plants to decrease their contribution Lake Michigan water pollution.

=== Cook County Coroner ===
In November 1928, running as the Democratic nominee, Bundesen was elected Cook County Coroner. He defeated the incumbent Republican coroner, Oscar Wolff, by a three-to-one margin. He received in excess of one million votes.

In this position, Bundensen continued to take opportunities for media attention. He took advantage of opportunities for media exposure after notable murders as well, including the Saint Valentine's Day Massacre and a 1930 mafia slaying of a Chicago Tribune reporter.

He would step down as coroner on November 13, 1931, in order to be reinstated as health commissioner, and would be succeeded as coroner by Frank J. Walsh, the former clerk of the criminal court.

=== Second tenure as Chicago City Health Commissioner and tenure as President of the Chicago Board of Health ===
In the 1931 Chicago mayoral election, Bundesen was speculated as a potential independent candidate, but in early March 1931 he declined to run in the April election. Despite having been rivals of sorts with Democratic nominee Anton Cermak, Bundesen supported him over William Hale Thompson in the election. Later in 1931, he was hired by the newly elected mayor Cermak to again head serve as Health Commissioner of the City of Chicago.

Going off of the allegations of spending that had been raised against Bundesen in 1927 by board of the Chicago Sanitary District, in 1931, Elmer L. Williams independently published a report accusing Bundensen of multiple improprieties during his time in civil service.

This time with national funding and public support, Bundesen was able to better tackle sexually transmitted diseases than he had been in his first tenure. He was successful in decreasing the rates of syphilis.

In May 1932, the Chicago City Council established a five-member board of health, an act which the powers of the Department of Health. Bundesen became president of the Chicago Board of Health, and also retained the position of health commissioner.

He continued to focus on his efforts to decrease infant mortality after his return to power. He also focused, again, on combatting impure milk.

Always keen on media attention, in 1933, Bundesen would use take advantage of opportunities media exposure arising from the occasion of Cermak's assassination.

In 1933, while the city was hosting its Century of Progress world's fair he received national praise for identifying an outbreak of amoebiasis in the city and eradicating it.

In 1936, he ran for the Democratic nomination for governor of Illinois, challenging incumbent governor Henry Horner. Bundesen's campaign was supported by the Chicago Democratic political machine, which was seeking to unseat Horner after Horner vetoed a bill supported by political bosses such as Mayor Edward J. Kelly that would have allowed bookmakers to operate legally. Kelly calculated that Bundesen's name recognition from his popular baby books could carry him to victory. During the campaign, Horner did not refer to Bundesen by name, and only referred to him as "Kelly's stooge". Horner distributed a rival "baby book" during the campaign. Bundesen, ultimately, was not taken by many as a serious candidate by many, in part due to his unorthodox campaigning style. He would, on the campaign trail across the state, don a monocle and spats while pulling stunts like pounding on his own abdomen in an effort to show his physical fitness. While Bundesen did win Cook County, Horner's support in the rest of the state was enough to carry him to a sizable victory.

After losing the Democratic primary for governor, Bundesen returned to his job as the chief health official of Chicago. He continued serving as President of the Chicago Board of Health until his death, and continued to serve as Health Commissioner of Chicago until only months earlier (being succeeded in that position by Samuel L. Andelman in April 1960). Over the years, Bundesen would be regularly speculated as a potential mayoral candidate.

By 1937, his efforts had made Chicago set new record lows for infant mortality rates in a large American city. Also in 1937, Bundesen participated in an experimental treatment for a critically ill infant girl. Sulfanilamide was injected into his bloodstream, given time to produce antibodies, and then his blood was injected into the baby, a treatment that ultimately saved her life.

In the autumn of 1937, Chicago was hit by a polio outbreak. After Bundesen consulted with mayor Edward Joseph Kelly, he and the Chicago Board of Health ordered that schools remain closed. This threatened to delay the start of the school year. However, superintendent of Chicago Public Schools William Johnson and deputy superintendent Minnie Fallon implemented a revolutionary program that provided distance learning to elementary school students through radio broadcasts.

Bundesen supported Jonas Salk's efforts to eradicate polio. In 1955, Chicago became one of the earliest cities in the United States to introduce Salk's polio vaccine. Bundesen campaigned for total inoculation of all youth.

Bundesen garnered strong repute within his field. He served as a senior surgeon with the United States Public Health Service.

== Personal life ==
In 1909, Bundesen married Rega Russell, who adopted the name Rega Russell Bundesen after their wedding. They had six children.

=== Death ===
Bundensen died of pancreatic cancer at Wesley Memorial Hospital in Chicago on August 25, 1960, at the age of 78. The cancer had been detected in April 1960, when Bundsen was having gallbladder operation. He had been in the hospital from then through July 8, when he was released and went to his summer home in Cedar Lake, Indiana. However, he returned to the hospital on July 24.

== Books authored ==
- Our Babies (1925)
- Before the Baby Comes (1926)
- The Growing Child (1927)
- Progress in the Prevention of Needless Neonatal Deaths (1952)

== See also ==
- History of public health in Chicago
