= William J. Stratton =

American politician (1886–1938)

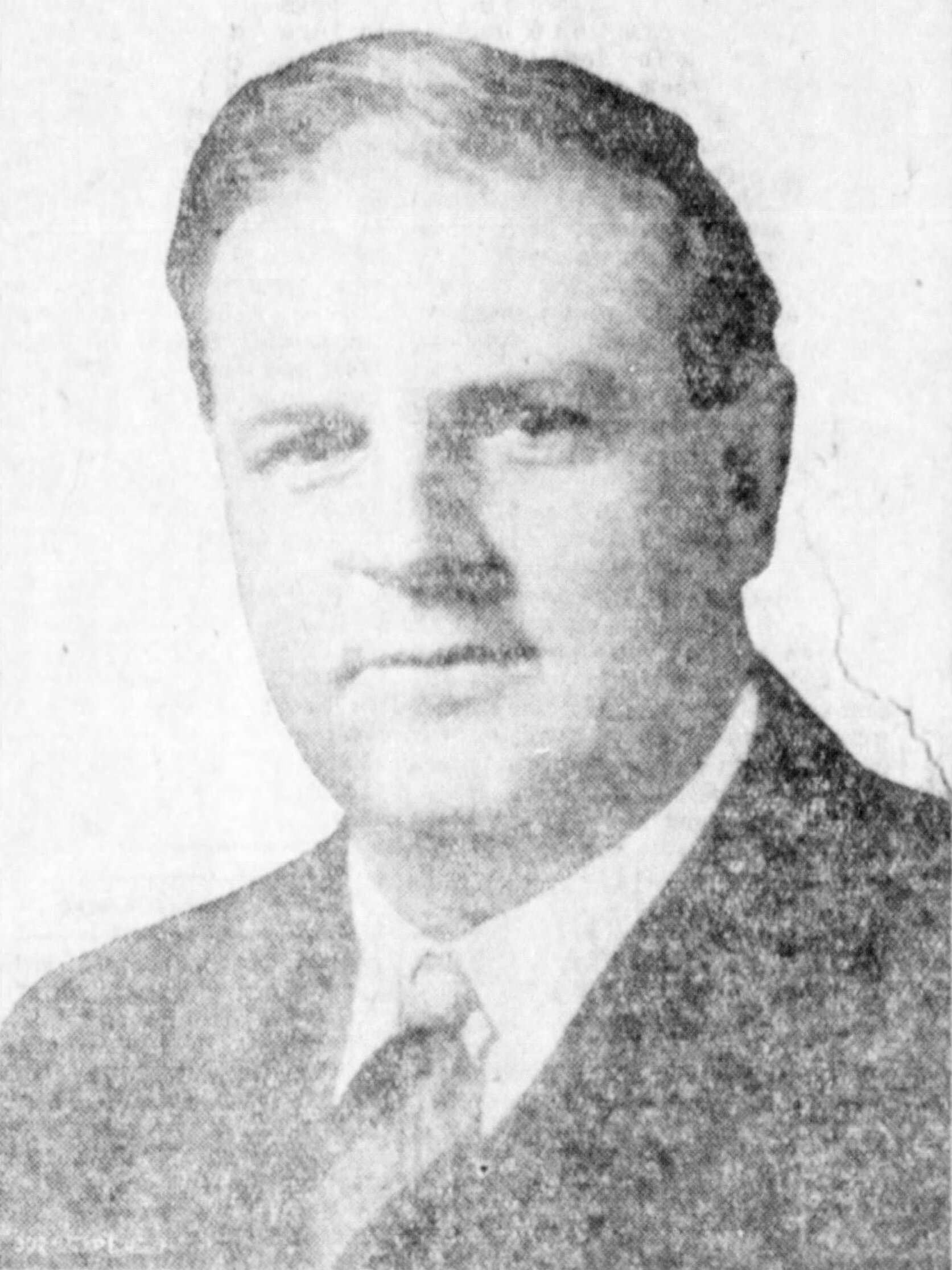
Stratton circa 1926

William Joseph Stratton (January 28, 1886 – May 8, 1938) was an American politician. His son William Grant Stratton was born in Ingleside, Lake County, Ill., on February 26, 1914.

== Early life ==
Born in Ingleside, Illinois, Lake County, Ill., January 28, 1886 to John Stratton and Mary O'Boyle Stratton.

Stratton was a farmer and an Illinois state game warden. Illinois Governor William Stratton was his son. He served as a township supervisor and was a Republican.

== Political career ==
He served as first director of the Illinois Department of Conservation. From 1929 until 1933, Stratton served as Illinois Secretary of State. Stratton died in Ingleside, Illinois.

William J. Stratton served as Republican Secretary of state of Illinois from 1929 to 1933; being defeated for reelection to a non-consecutive additional term in 1936. He was a candidate for Illinois state treasurer in 1934, and a Member of the Elks, Woodmen, and Freemasons.

== Death ==
He died in Ingleside, Lake County, Ill., on May 8, 1938 (age 52 years, 100 days) and was interred at North Shore Garden of Memories, North Chicago, Ill.

== Notes ==
Party political offices
Preceded by Louis Lincoln Emmerson	Republican nominee for Secretary of State of Illinois; 1928, 1932, 1936	Succeeded by Justus L. Johnson
Preceded by Charles W. Brooks	Republican nominee for Illinois Treasurer; 1934	Succeeded by Clarence F. Buck
Political offices
Preceded by Louis L. Emmerson	Secretary of State of Illinois; 1929–1933	Succeeded by Edward J. Hughes
