= John Dill Robertson =

American politician

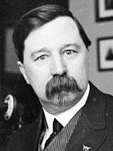
- Robertson in 1915

President of the Chicago West Parks Board
- In office 1924–1930
- Preceded by: John C. Kruse
- Succeeded by: W. R. James

President of the Chicago Board of Education
- In office 1922–1923
- Preceded by: Edwin S. Davis
- Succeeded by: Charles Moderwell

Chicago Health Commissioner
- In office 1915 – February 1, 1922
- Mayor: William Hale Thompson; William Emmett Dever
- Preceded by: George B. Young
- Succeeded by: Herman Bundesen

Personal details
- Born: March 8, 1871 Mechanicsburg, Pennsylvania
- Died: August 20, 1931 (aged 60) Fontana-on-Geneva Lake, Wisconsin
- Party: Republican
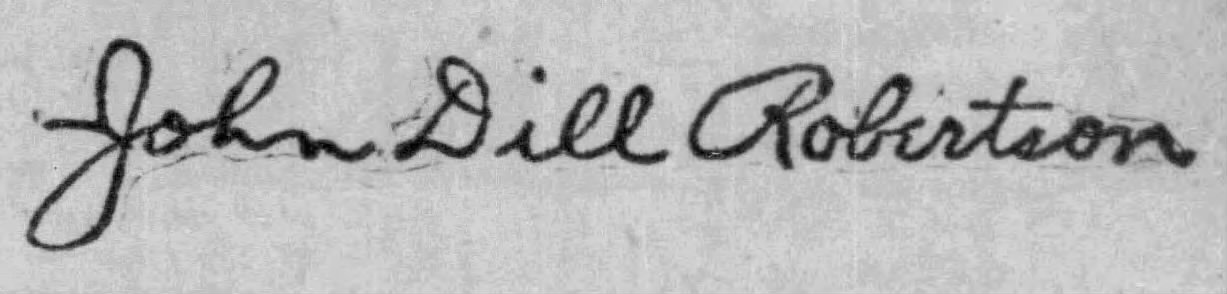
- Signature

John Dill Robertson (March 8, 1871 – August 20, 1931) was an American medical professional and politician. He served as Chicago's city health commissioner, president of the Chicago Board of Education, and president of the Chicago West Parks Board. In 1927, Robertson ran a third-party campaign for Chicago mayor. As a politician, Thompson was affiliated with the Republican Party. He was an ally of Republican boss Frederick Lundin, and prior to his 1927 mayoral campaign against him, had also long been an ally of William Hale Thompson.

During Robertson's tenure as health commissioner, the city was impacted by the pandemic of the 1918 Spanish flu. After the pandemic receded in the city, Robertson successfully worked to promote legislation to make it easier to become a registered nurse in Illinois, after noticing the necessity of more registered nurses during the outbreak. Also during his tenure as health commissioner, a 1921 decision by the Supreme Court of Illinois greatly weakened the authority of the office.

== Early life and education ==
Robertson was born on March 8, 1871, in Mechanicsburg, Pennsylvania. Robertson, as a young man, worked as a telegraph operator.

He moved to Chicago to attend Bennett Medical College, graduating in 1896.

== Early career ==
In 1898, after serving as an intern at Cook County Hospital, he was appointed attending surgeon, a position he held there through 1913. He was also surgeon-in chief at Jefferson Park Polyclinic Hospital from 1904 through 1915.

Robertson organized the American College of Medicine and Surgery in 1900, and was its president until it merged with Loyola University Chicago's own medical school.

Politically, for many years, he would be a close associate of Republican political boss Frederick Lundin. He would also be an ally of Mayor William Hale Thompson.

== Chicago City Health Commissioner ==
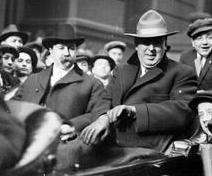
Robertson (center left) rides with Mayor Thompson (center right) in an automobile during a 1915 parade

For seven years, under Mayor William Hale Thompson, Robertson served as City Health Commissioner. He was appointed in 1915, succeeding George B. Young, and served through 1922.

At the same time, Robertson also headed the Chicago Municipal Tuberculosis Sanitarium. He hired architect Jarvis Hunt to design multiple additions to the complex. Under his direction, in 1916, the sanitarium also added more beds for children.

Robertson worked to cut down on public spitting.

=== 1918 Spanish flu pandemic ===
Robertson oversaw the city's health department during the 1918 Spanish flu pandemic. Ultimately, 8,500 Chicago residents died during the pandemic.

The first local diagnosed cases occurred at Great Lakes Naval Training Center in North Chicago, Illinois, on September 8, and, despite all leaves being canceled for enlisted men, the flu found its way to the City of Chicago two weeks later, likely as visitors had not been prohibited at the training base. A week after cases were diagnosed at Great Lakes, cases were diagnosed among Northwestern University's SATC unit, and, days after that, cases were diagnosed among the Lewis Institute SATC on South Honye Street in Chicago itself.

Robertson's public proclamations greatly underestimated/undersold the severity of the pandemic. On September 21, brushing off fears of the flu spreading from army camps into the city's general population, Robertson declared, "I see no cause for public alarm, but every one developing any symptoms should be careful.". On September 23, due to the number of new cases decreasing at Great Lakes, but at only the beginning of Chicago's outbreak, Robertson insisted that, "We have the Spanish influenza situation well in hand now." On October 7, a full week before the peak of death rates, he was already declaring, "The backbone of the epidemic is broken."

The city initially only engaged in campaigns to ask Chicagoans to and cover their mouths when coughing and sneezing.

September 16, Robertson made the flu a reportable disease.

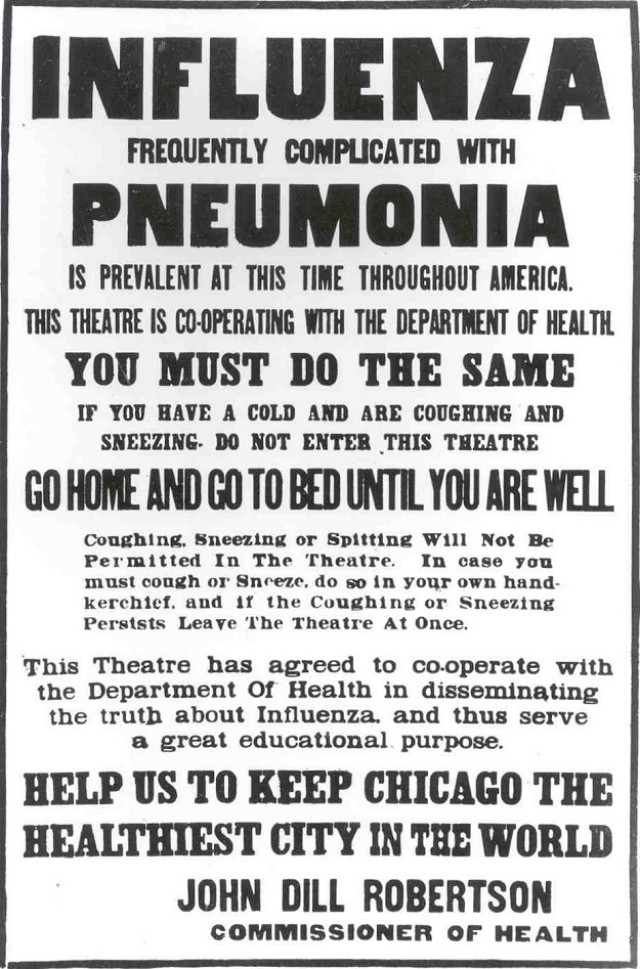
A public health notice that was displayed in a Chicago theater amid the flu pandemic

The city did not close schools during the pandemic. This was in contrast to the vast majority of American cities, which closed their schools during the flu pandemic. Chicago was, alongside New York City and New Haven, Connecticut, one of the most notable exceptions in which a city kept its schools open. Robertson opposed dismissing schools, believing that the city's school hygiene program was capable of sufficiently identifying probable cases of infected students who should be sent home and taking care of the healthy pupils remaining in the classrooms. An argument made for keeping schools open was that by having students in schools, they were keeping students off of the city's streets, and therefore away from adults infected with the virus. To avRobertson ordered for any student who coughed or sneezed to be "sent home at once". In an effort to avoid a spread in the city's schools, classrooms were overheated in order allow windows to remain open at all times, in order to allow fresh air to circulate. Truancy rose greatly in Chicago schools during the pandemic. One Chicago public health official accredited the rise in truancy to "fluphobia" among parents. Howard Markel has provided historical analysis which has found that the rate of truancy was so great, that, in regards to the spread of the virus, it "really didn't matter" that schools remained opened, since so few pupils were actually attending classes.

Robertson urged residents to wear protective masks.

Robertson advised interim general superintendent of the Chicago Police Department, John H. Alcock, to have officers stop all "persistent sneezers and coughers" that failed to cover their faces with handkerchiefs. Violators that pledged to obey instructions in the future would be released, but individuals who gave officers trouble would be arrested, lectured on the hazards of the flu, and sent to a judge for arraignment.

Robertson warned the managers and owners of theaters to make sure their consumers used handkerchiefs, threatening to otherwise close their businesses.

Churches, schools, theaters, restaurants, streetcars, and other locations in which people gathered were ordered to maintain proper ventilation.

Robertson suggested commuters walk whenever it was possible in order to avoid overcrowding in public transportation. Laws were passed which banned public spitting and which outlawed smoking on L trains.

On October 1, Robertson ordered a virtual quarantine for all those diagnosed, ordering that they remain at home and have no visitors.

The city waited until cases spiked before closing most public gathering spaces. An Emergency Commission formed to deal with the pandemic. On October 12, the Emergency Commission ordered the cessation of public dancing, determining this necessary due to the "close contact between dancers, the exercise of the dance and the frequent chilling of the body that is to follow". On October 15, theaters, cinemas, skating rinks, night schools, and lodge halls were ordered closed. On October 18, the commission finally ordered, "all public gatherings not essential to the war, such as banquets, conventions, lectures, social affairs, athletic contests, of a public nature stopped. Music, cabarets and other entertainments stopped in restaurants and cafes. Crowding prohibited in poolrooms, saloons, etc." October 18, incidentally, happened to be the peak of the pandemic in Chicago. Interim Police Chief Alcock pledge to strictly enforce the health measures.

Churches were permitted, amid the pandemic, to continue holding services, as they were viewed as essential to morale. Robertson, however, requested that church services be short, that windows be kept open throughout the services, and that congregations quickly leave for home as soon as services ended.

On October 12 the Emergency Commission recommended that the Chicago Surface Lines leave streetcar front doors open in order to allow a constant stream of fresh air to enter the cabins. They did not stop a Liberty bond parade from being held the same day, believing it had been too late to cancel it.

The pandemic's worst impact in Chicago was roughly a month long. By October 21, Chicago had received 100,000 doses of influenza vaccine.

In November, by which time the Spanish Flu had already greatly infected much of the population and had begun to recede, restrictions were loosened. One ban implemented during the pandemic which remained following it was a prohibition of smoking on public transportation.

Robertson has been accused of scapegoating African Americans coming to the city amid the Great Migration for the city's pandemic.

By January 1919, with the pandemic largely over, Robertson began moving to fix some of the problems revealed by the pandemic. Highest on his priorities was addressing the nursing shortage it had experienced. In February 1919, the Illinois General Assembly passed a bill which would make it easier to become a registered nurse in Illinois.

=== 1921 Supreme Court of Illinois decision ===
Litigation occurred in 1921, which greatly weakened the authority of the Health Commissioner of Chicago. The lawsuit was raised by Jennie Barmore, who was being forcefully quarantined as an asymptomatic carrier of typhoid at the orders of Robertson and health commission epidemiologist Herman Bundesen. The qaurantine was upheld. Clarence Darrow had been the lawyer representing Barmore. However, the court also found that the health commissioner lacked much authority, since the city had no board of health (as authorized by the state), but instead had itself established a Department of Health. The court decided that the Chicago City Council had no authority to delegate to the Department of Health authority equivalent to what the state would allow them to grant a board of health. Consequently top health official of Chicago would have weakened authority until a board of health was created in Chicago in 1932.

=== Resignation ===
Robertson resigned as Chicago Health Commissioner on February 1, 1922, and Herman Bundesen was appointed his successor.

== Chicago Board of Education ==
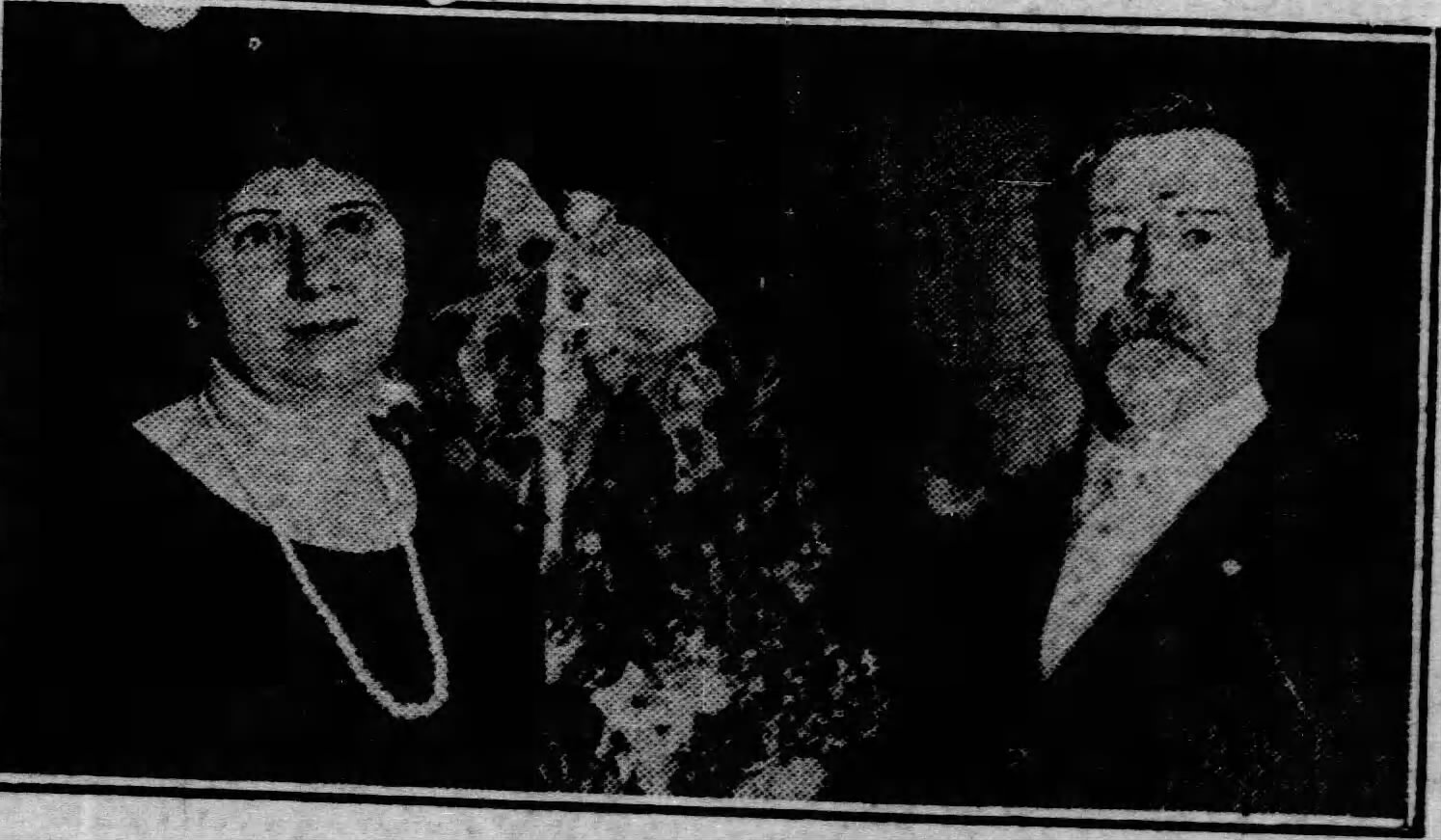
Robertson, the newly-installed Chicago Board of Education president (right), pictured with newly-installed board vice president Pauline Struwing (left)

Robertson served President of the Chicago Board of Education. He was appointed by Mayor Thompson to the Board of Education in 1922, and was elected the board's president on July 13, 1922. The Chicago Teachers Federation, the Women's City Club, and the Chicago Woman's Club had opposed the appointment of Robertson to the Chicago Board of Education.

In 1923, at a Republican Party banquet held in Sacramento, California, Robertson, leading the Chicago delegation on behalf of the governor and mayor, made it known that he wanted to see the Republican party platform at the 1924 Republican National Convention include a plank relating to public health.

In 1923, his presidency of the Board of Education ended. He remained on the board, however.

In January 1924, Robertson abstained from voting on whether to appoint William McAndrew as superintendent of Chicago Public Schools, while all of the other members of the Chicago Board of Education approved McAndrew's appointment.

== President of the West Park Board ==
Robertson was made president of the West Park Board with the support of Governor Len Small in May 1924, resigning his seat on the Board of Education in order to take this office. In the weeks preceding his appointment by Small, Thompson had organized a "coup" in which he the majority of the board to elect John C. Kruse as its president. After this, 300 people were told they would lose their parks jobs. Soon after this, Governor Small had ousted three commissioners and announced Robertson as his choice to be the board's president. Thompson, reportedly, tried to convince Small to rescind his selection of Robertson. At Small's request, the board elected Robertson as its president on May 3, 1924. He was reelected its president on April 7, 1927.

=== 1927 mayoral campaign ===
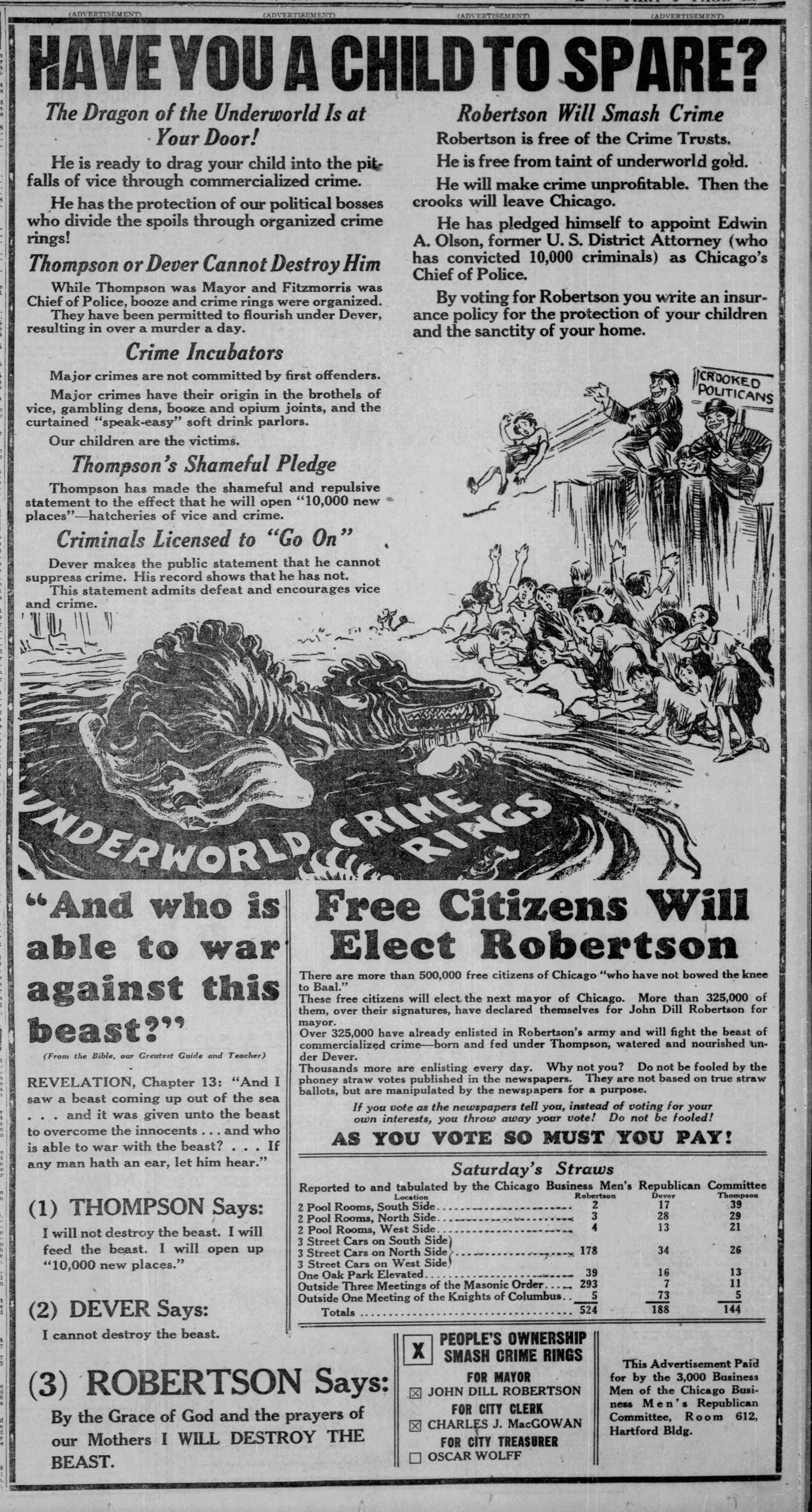
Newspaper advertisement for Robertson's campaign, paid for by the Chicago Business Men's Republican Committee. The advertisement touts Robertson as the mayoral candidate that could quash the "beast" of crime.

In 1927, as Thompson was staging a political comeback to retake the mayoralty, Robertson challenged him. He ran first as an opponent in the Republican primary, but withdrew to support Edward R. Litsinger's campaign (at the request of Frederick Lundin). After Thompson won the Republican primary, Robertson reentered the race as a third-party candidate, running on a "smash crime rings" platform. he promised to enforce Prohibition while it was still on the books and to smash organized crime in thirty days if elected, comparing gunmen gangs to boils and the bootleg industry to an appendix, and promising to "find another Theodore Roosevelt" as police chief. At a rally on March 28, 1927, Robertson announced that, if elected, he would appoint former United States attorney Edwin A. Olson as police chief. Robertson was still president of the West Parks Board at the time of his mayoral campaign.

Robertson blamed former mayor Thompson for contributing to the city's crime problem.

Robertson ran on the ticket of his newly-founded "People's Ownership Smash Crime Rings" party, and included Cook County Coroner Oscar Wolff on his party's ticket as its nominee for city treasurer of Chicago and Charles J. McGowan as its nominee for city clerk of Chicago. He filed the party's petition with the same day as the city's mayoral primaries, filing a 43,724 ballot petition before the polls closed to get his People's Ownership Smash Crime Rings line on the general election ballot.

Robertson was supported in the general election by Lundin. Robertson was also supported by the incumbent 43rd ward alderman Arthur F. Albert, whose opponent Titus Haffa had endorsed Thompson. Henry F. Batterman, Lundin's 41st ward committeeman, supported Robertson before crossing over to Thompson. Despite Thompson's popularity with African American voters, there were Edward Herbert Wright-aligned Black Republicans who publicly backed Robertson.

Robertson placed third in the election held on April 5, 1927, behind Thompson and Democratic incumbent William Emmett Dever. Robertson received 51,347 votes, equivalent to 5.14% of the overall vote.

== Motorists' Association of Chicago ==
In 1930, Robertson resigned as President of the West Parks Board to become the safety and medical director of the Motorists' Association of Chicago. At notable incident that occurred while he was safety and medical director for this organization was a fist fight he got into with Sidney Gorgham, director of the Chicago Motor Club, at a heated committee hearing of the Illinois General Assembly where Robertson was lobbying on behalf of a law relating to driver's licenses.

In April 1930, he campaigned heavily on behalf of Republican John H. Lyle's campaign for Judge of the Municipal Court of Chicago.

== Personal life ==
Robertson married his first wife Bessie M. Foote, and was widowed when she died February 9, 1930. He was remarried in May 2, 1931, to his secretary of nine years, Helen Remy Hughes.

=== Death ===
Robertson died at age 60 on August 20, 1931, of angina at his summer home in Fontana-on-Geneva Lake, Wisconsin. He was survived by his wife Helen Robertson, who he had married only months earlier, and his son, Dr. Tomas Sanderson Robertson. His health had been so bad in the last months of his life that he had to abandon his honeymoon to Europe.
