= Thomas P. Gunning =

American dentist and politician

Thomas F. Gunning

Member of the Illinois Senate
- In office 1931–1943

Personal details
- Born: Thomas Porter Gunning; June 26, 1882 near Neponset, Illinois, U.S.
- Died: November 9, 1943 (aged 61) Princeton, Illinois, U.S.
- Party: Republican
- Occupation: Politician, dentist

Thomas Porter Gunning (June 26, 1882 – November 9, 1943) was an American dentist and politician.

Gunning was born near Neponset, Illinois; he received his degree in dentistry from the Chicago College of Dental Surgery in 1905. Gunning then practiced dentistry in Princeton, Illinois. Gunning served on the Princeton City Council and as mayor. He was a Republican. Gunning served in the Illinois Senate from 1931 until his death in 1943. Gunning died in a hospital in Princeton, Illinois from complications due to surgery.

In 1936, he unsuccessfully sought the Republican nomination for governor.
