= Omer N. Custer =

American journalist

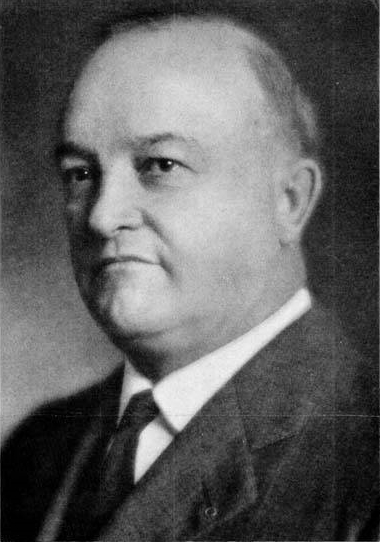

43rd and 45th Illinois Treasurer
- In office January 12, 1925 – January 10, 1927
- Governor: Len Small
- Preceded by: Oscar Nelson
- Succeeded by: Garrett D. Kinney
- In office January 14, 1929 – January 12, 1931
- Governor: Louis Lincoln Emmerson
- Preceded by: Garrett D. Kinney
- Succeeded by: Edward J. Barrett

Personal details
- Born: December 25, 1873 Fayette County, Pennsylvania, U.S.
- Died: October 17, 1942 (aged 68) Galesburg, Illinois, U.S.
- Party: Republican

Omer Nixon Custer (December 25, 1873 – October 17, 1942) was an American politician, newspaper editor, and businessman.

== Life ==
Born in Fayette County, Pennsylvania, Custer moved to Galesburg, Illinois where he owned the Galesburg Register-Mail newspaper. He was also president of the Galesburg National Bank and of the telephone company. Custer was a Republican. He served as Illinois Treasurer from 1925 to 1927 and 1929 to 1931. As time went on Omer Custer expanded his business enterprises in many fields of endeavor. The 1930–31 edition of "Who's Who in America" included Custer, listed as the president of the First Galesburg National Bank, Purington Paving Brick Company, Western Illinois Ice Company, Hotel Custer Company; publisher of the Galesburg Register-Mail; and director of the Intra State Telephone Company, Illinois Light and Power Company, Galesburg Overall Company, Beatrice Creamery Company, and Western Investment Company. He was a member of the Masons, Elks, Rotary, Hamilton Club and Chicago Rod and Gun Club. He was also a trustee of Lombard College.

== Death ==
Custer died in Galesburg, Illinois of a heart attack on October 17, 1942. His estate was valued at $1,169,704.

== Electoral history ==
Illinois Treasurer Republican Primary, 1924
Party	Candidate	Votes	%
Republican	Omer N. Custer	251,508	32.81
Republican	Charles T. Stephenson	188,122	24.54
Republican	Charles A. Gregory	183,554	23.95
Republican	Peter I. Bukowski	72,452	9.45
Republican	Matthew B. Wells	70,914	9.25
Total votes		766,550	100.0

Illinois Treasurer General Election, 1924
Party	Candidate	Votes	%
Republican	Omer N. Custer	1,498,925	67.71
Democratic	John C. Martin	693,658	31.34
Socialist	John T. Whitlock	17,397	0.79
Socialist Labor	Abe Cohen	2,443	0.11
Independent Republican	Hugh W. O’Toole	768	0.03
Single Tax	Robert T. Aiston	433	0.02
Total votes		2,213,624	100.0

Illinois Treasurer Republican Primary, 1928
Party	Candidate	Votes	%
Republican	Omer N. Custer	899,550	70.90
Independent Republican	Omer N. Custer	37	0.00
Total	Omer N. Custer	899,587	70.91
Republican	I. J. Brown	369,086	29.09
Independent Republican	I. J. Brown	10	0.00
Total	I. J. Brown	369,096	29.09
Total votes		1,268,683	100.0

Illinois Treasurer General Election, 1928
Party	Candidate	Votes	%
Republican	Omer N. Custer	1,626,253	56.99
Democratic	George W. Alschuler	1,213,188	42.51
Socialist	John T. Whitlock	12,707	0.45
Socialist Labor	H. R. Bloemsma	1,502	0.05
Total votes		2,853,650	100.0

Illinois Gubernatorial Republican Primary, 1932
Party	Candidate	Votes	%
Republican	Len Small	481,960	36.64
Republican	Omer N. Custer	370,301	28.15
Republican	Oscar E. Carlstrom	282,741	21.50
Republican	William H. Malone	116,838	8.88
Republican	Edward J. Brundage	38,449	2.92
Republican	Willard A. Maxwell	13,413	1.02
Republican	Herbert E. Clayton	6,259	0.48
Republican	J. Edward Jones	5,284	0.40
Total votes		1,315,245	100.0

== Notes ==
Party political offices
Preceded by Oscar Nelson	Republican nominee for Illinois Treasurer; 1924	Succeeded by Garrett D. Kinney
Preceded by Garrett D. Kinney	Republican nominee for Illinois Treasurer; 1928	Succeeded by Clarence F. Buck
Political offices
Preceded by Oscar Nelson	Treasurer of Illinois; 1925–1927	Succeeded by Garrett D. Kinney
Preceded by Garrett D. Kinney	Treasurer of Illinois; 1929–1931	Succeeded by Edward J. Barrett
