= James J. Brady (Illinois official) =

American politician (1878–1941)

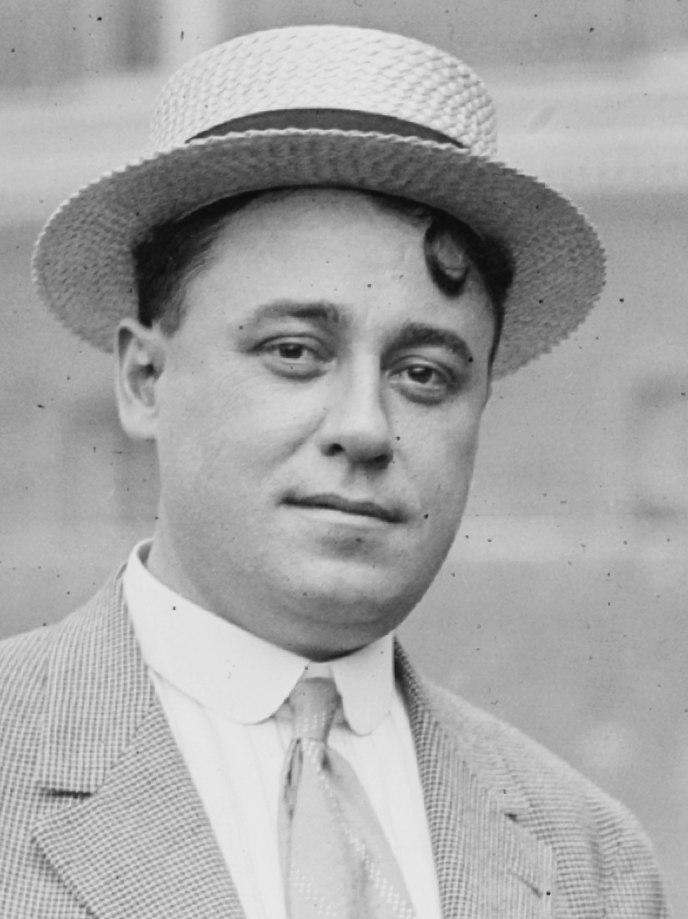
James J. Brady

James J. Brady (January 10, 1878 – February 11, 1941) was the Illinois state auditor of public accounts from 1913 to 1917.

Born in Chicago, Illinois, Brady worked for the Western Telegraph Company. From 1913 to 1917, Brady served as Illinois Auditor of Public Accounts and was a Democrat. He was a candidate for the Illinois state treasurer in 1918.

Party political offices
Preceded by Ralph Jeffris	Democratic nominee for Illinois Auditor of Public Accounts; 1912, 1916, 1920	Succeeded by Edward J. Hughes
Political offices
Preceded by James S. McCullough	Illinois Auditor of Public Accounts; 1913–1917	Succeeded by Andrew Russel
