= Senator Gore =

Senator Gore may refer to:

== Members of the United States Senate ==
- Al Gore (born 1948), U.S. Senator from Tennessee from 1985 to 1993
- Albert Gore Sr. (1907–1998), U.S. Senator from Tennessee from 1953 to 1971
- Christopher Gore (1758–1827), U.S. Senator from Massachusetts from 1813 to 1816
- Thomas Gore (1870–1949), U.S. Senator from Oklahoma from 1907 to 1921 and from 1931 to 1937

== United States state senate members ==
- David Gore (1827–1911), Illinois State Senate
- Louise Gore (1925–2005), Maryland State Senate
