= Oscar Nelson =

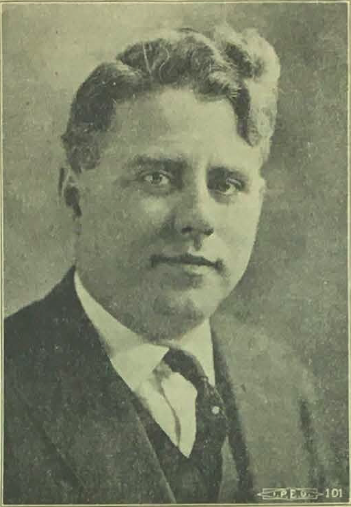

Illinois Auditor of Public Accounts
- In office 1926–1933
- Governor: Len Small; Louis Lincoln Emmerson
- Preceded by: Andrew Russel
- Succeeded by: Edward J. Barrett

Illinois Treasurer
- In office 1923–1925
- Governor: Len Small
- Preceded by: Edward E. Miller
- Succeeded by: Omer N. Custer

Personal details
- Born: April 22, 1874 Sweden
- Died: April 2, 1951 (aged 76) Geneva, Illinois, US
- Political party: Republican

Oscar Nelson (April 22, 1874 – April 2, 1951) was a politician and union leader who served as Illinois treasurer Illinois auditor of public accounts. He also served as the interim president of the Building Service Employees International Union, the precursor of the Service Employees International Union, in 1927.

== Early life and early career ==
Nelson was born in Sweden. He emigrated to the United States and got a job as a delivery boy. He held employment as a grocery clerk, foundry worker and railway worker, but finally went into the banking industry and eventually became president of the Geneva State Bank and head of the Kane Co. Bankers' Association.

== Tenures as state treasurer (1923–1925) and state auditor (1925–1933) ==
Nelson was elected state treasurer in 1922. In 1924, Nelson won election as the Auditor for the state of Illinois and re-elected in 1928. In 1931, Nelson was tried on charges of malfeasance for refusing to close banks even though he knew they were in poor financial condition. Nelson was acquitted after a state court ruled juries had no jurisdiction over state officers. As auditor, Nelson succeeded BSEIU founding president William Quesse, a close friend and political backer who had died of cancer on February 16, 1927. Nelson resigned due to health concerns on September 3, 1927. Jerry Horan, a BSEIU organizer whose primary job was to act as Quesse's chauffeur, was elected Nelson's successor on September 6, 1927.

== Later career ==
A Republican, Nelson was appointed a member of the Republican National Committee's platform drafting panel in 1937.

Nelson retired from electoral politics in 1932, but continued to serve served in a number of appointed capacities (most notably on a factory conversion commission after World War II). He was also president and owner of the Unity Oil & Gas Corporation.

== Death ==
Oscar Nelson died (most probably of a heart attack) in his home in Geneva, Illinois in 1951.

Party political offices
Preceded by Edward E. Miller	Republican nominee for Illinois Treasurer; 1922	Succeeded by Omer N. Custer
Preceded by Andrew Russel	Republican nominee for Illinois Auditor of Public Accounts; 1924, 1928	Succeeded by Harry G. Wright
Political offices
Preceded by Edward E. Miller	Illinois Treasurer; 1923–1925	Succeeded by Omer N. Custer
Preceded by Andrew Russel	Illinois Auditor of Public Accounts; 1926 – 1933	Succeeded by Edward J. Barrett
Business positions
Preceded by William Quesse	President of Service Employees International Union; 1927	Succeeded by Jerry Horan
