= List of awards and nominations received by Psych =

Accolades received by Psych
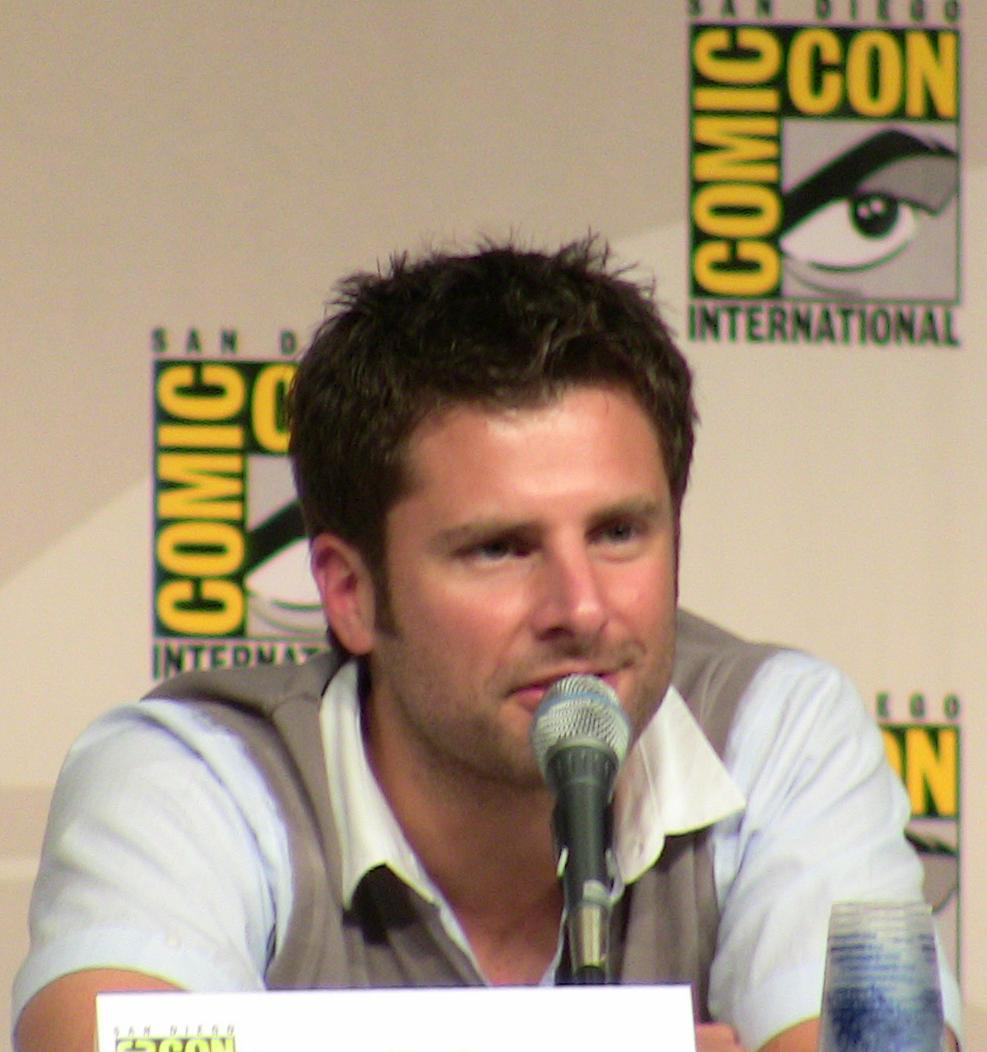
- James Roday, who received four ALMA Award nominations for his performance as Shawn Spencer in the series
Awards & nominations
	Won	Nominated
ALMA Awards	0	4
Artios Awards	0	1
ASCAP Awards	2	2
Emmy Awards	0	2
EWwy Awards	0	3
IIG Awards	1	1
Image Awards	0	8
Imagen Awards	1	3
NAMIC Vision Awards	0	2
People's Choice Awards	1	2
Satellite Awards	0	1
Young Artist Awards	0	2
- Total number of wins and nominations
Totals	5	31
- Footnotes

Psych is an American comedy-drama television series which was broadcast from 2006 until 2014. Created by Steve Franks, the series aired on USA Network for eight seasons with a total of one-hundred and twenty one episodes. Psych stars James Roday, Dulé Hill, Maggie Lawson, Timothy Omundson, Kirsten Nelson, and Corbin Bernsen, with Roday and Hill earning award nominations for their respective roles.

Psych received awards from: the Independent Investigations Group, the American Society of Composers, Authors and Publishers, the People's Choice Awards and the Imagen Foundation. The series also received nominations for several other awards, including four ALMA Awards, two Creative Arts Emmy Awards, eight Image Awards, one People's Choice Award, and one Satellite Award. In total, Psych received thirty-one award nominations in its eight-year tenure. The show has been recognized in terms of awards for its first episode, "Pilot"; its musical team; the series itself; and actor James Roday. Roday and Hill also lead in nominations, with nine.

== ALMA Awards ==
The American Latino Media Arts Awards (ALMA Awards) highlight the best American Latino contributions to music, television, and film. The awards are meant to promote fair and accurate portrayals of Latinos, and are organized by the National Council of La Raza. The ALMAs were originally held in 1987 as the "BRAVO Awards". They became televised in 1995, and are currently aired by the National Broadcasting Company (NBC). James Roday was nominated for his acting four times between 2008 and 2012 (no awards ceremony was held in 2010) without a single win.

ALMA Awards and nominations received by Psych
Year	Category	Nominee	Result	Ref.
2008	Outstanding Actor in a Drama Television Series	James Roday	Nominated	
2009	Year in TV Comedy – Actor	James Roday	Nominated	
2011	Favorite TV Actor – Leading Role	James Roday	Nominated	
2012	Favorite TV Actor	James Roday	Nominated	

== Artios Awards ==
The Artios Awards are annually presented by the Casting Society of America and recognize the "originality, creativity and the contribution of casting to the overall quality of a project". The awards honor members of the Casting Society, and have been awarded yearly since 1985. Casting for theatrical, film, and television performances are all eligible. The show was nominated once, for pilot episode casting, and lost.

Artios Awards and nominations received by Psych
Year	Category	Nominee	Result	Ref.
2007	Best Comedy Pilot Casting	Liz Marx	Nominated	

== ASCAP Awards ==
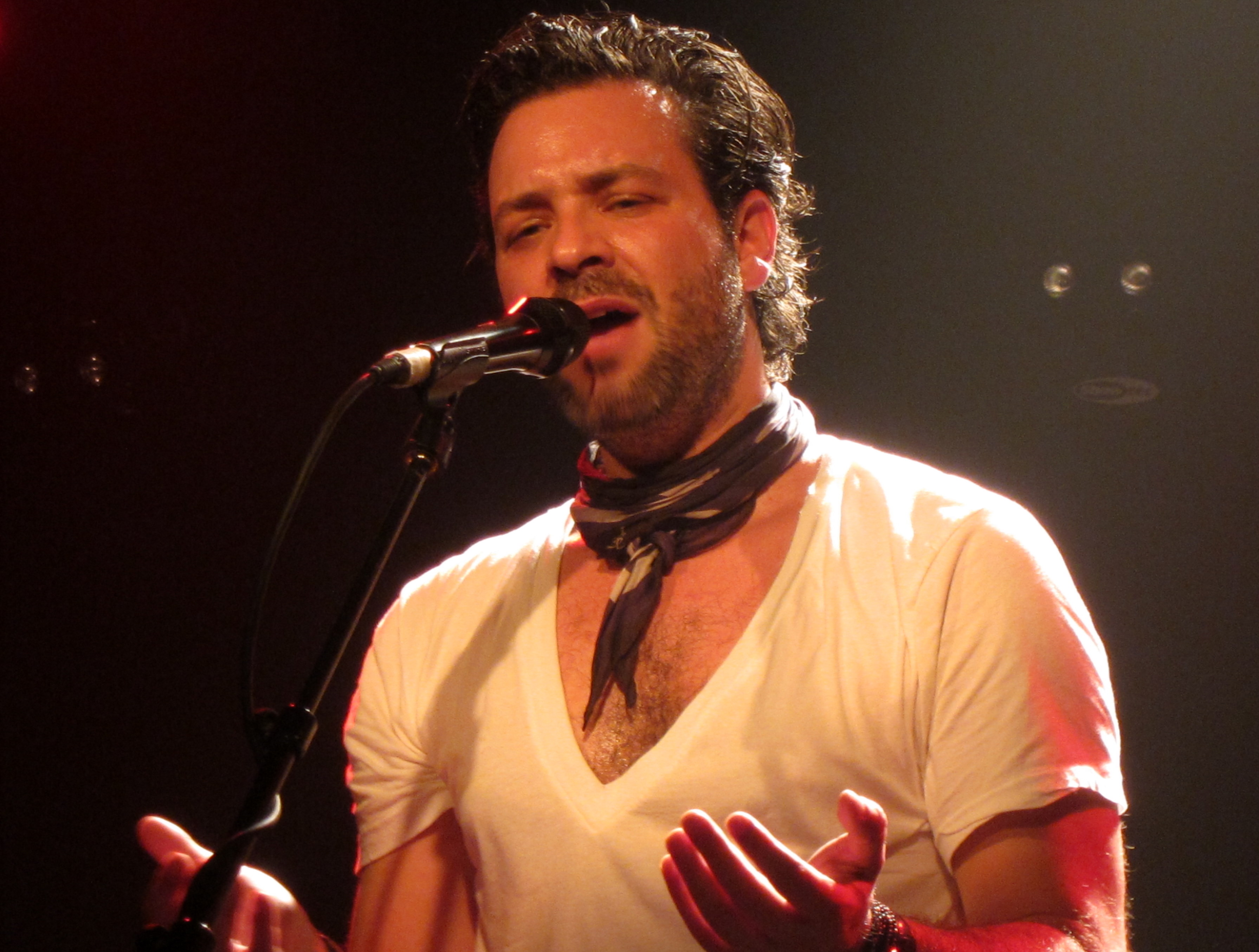
Musicians Adam Cohen (pictured) and John Robert Wood were both honored twice by the ASCAP for their work on the show

The ASCAP Awards are presented annually by the American Society of Composers, Authors and Publishers and honor achievements in film and video game music and television theme music and scores. Psych was twice honored for its music, both times recognizing composers Adam Cohen and John Robert Wood.

ASCAP Awards and nominations received by Psych
Year	Category	Nominees	Result	Ref.
2009	Best in Shows – Cable Television	Adam Cohen; John Robert Wood	Won	
2013	Top Television Series	Adam Cohen; Steve Franks; John Robert Wood	Won	

== Emmy Awards ==
Awarded since 1949, the Primetime Emmy Award is an annual accolade bestowed by members of the Academy of Television Arts & Sciences recognizing outstanding achievements in American prime time TV programming. Awards presented for more technical and production-based categories (like art direction, casting, and editing) are designated "Creative Arts Emmy Awards." Psych was nominated twice for creative arts awards, honoring both the show's music and an interactive video game. The series lost both awards.

Creative Arts Emmy Awards and nominations received by Psych
Year	Category	Nominee	Result	Ref.
2010	Outstanding Music Composition For A Series (Original Dramatic Score)	Adam Cohen; John Robert Wood for "Mr. Yin Presents..."	Nominated	
2012	Outstanding Creative Achievement in Interactive Media-Original Interactive Television Programming	Psych Hashtag Killer	Nominated	

== EWwy Awards ==
First presented in 2008, the EWwy Awards are presented annually by Entertainment Weekly and Hulu. The EWwys are given to shows that "are egregiously overlooked, underappreciated and essentially snubbed by the Emmy Awards", as voted by the public. The awards cover most Primetime Emmy categories. The series received three EWwy nominations, once in 2008 and twice in 2009. Both the show itself and James Roday were nominated, losing to the series Chuck.

EWwy Awards and nominations received by Psych
Year	Category	Nominee	Result	Ref.
2008	Best Comedy Series	Psych	Nominated	
2009	Best Comedy Series	Psych	Nominated	
2009	Best Lead Actor in a Comedy Series	James Roday	Nominated	

== IIG Awards ==
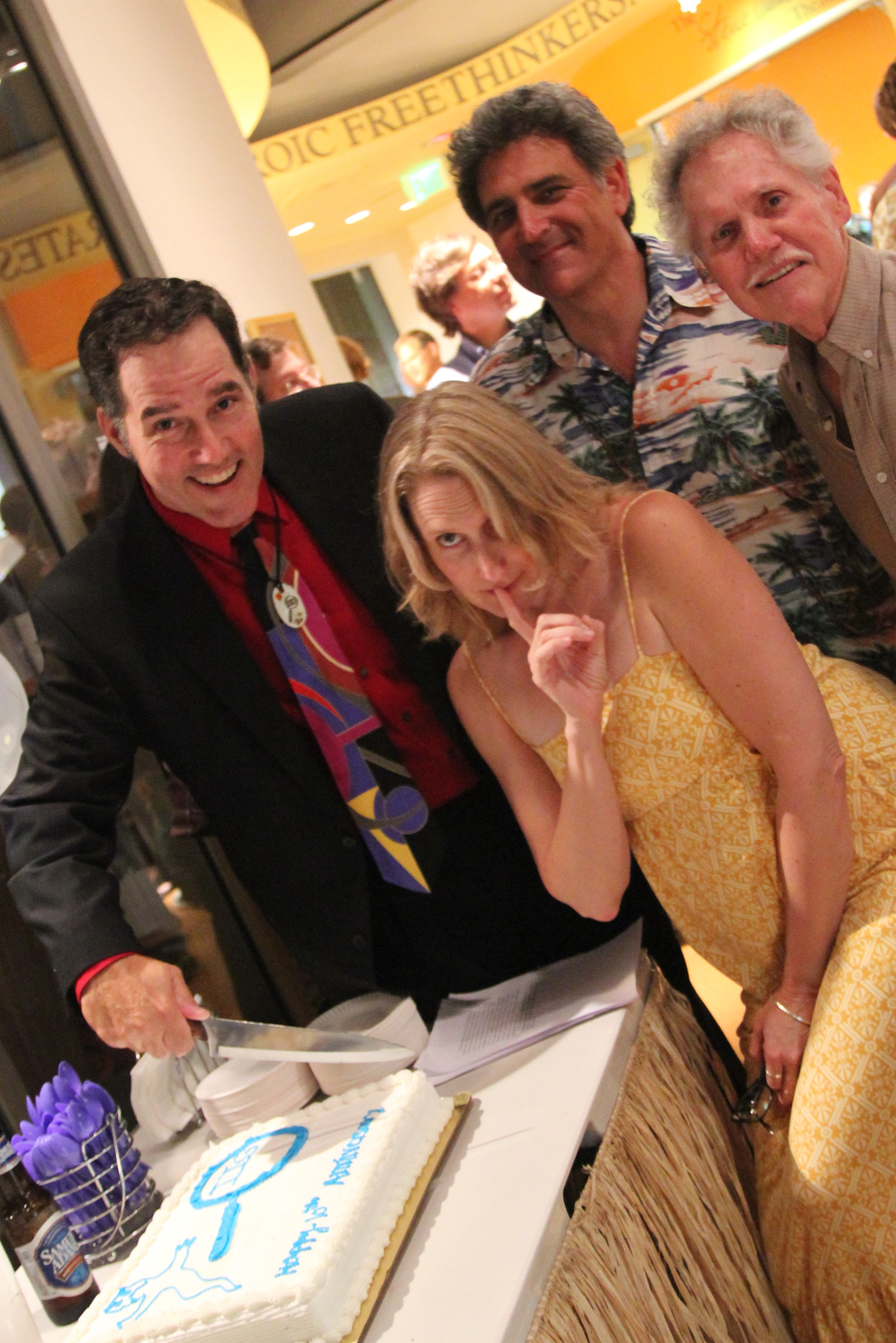
The Independent Investigations Group (founders pictured) honored Psych for promoting science in the episode "Pilot"

The IIG Awards are presented yearly by the Independent Investigations Group and recognize "movies, television shows, and people in the entertainment field for promoting scientific knowledge and values". The awards were first presented in 2007, honoring the best and worst representations of science in the media. The show was honored with an Iggie Award at the inaugural ceremony, which was accepted by staff writer Daniel Hsia.

IIG Awards and nominations received by Psych
Year	Category	Nominee	Result	Ref.
2007	Iggie Award	Daniel Hsia for "Pilot"	Won	

== Image Awards ==
The Image Awards are presented annually by the National Association for the Advancement of Colored People (NAACP) and honor "excellence in film, television, music, and literature by outstanding people of color" as well as people who "promote social justice through their creative endeavors". The awards were first established in 1967 by the NAACP's Hollywood branch, and have been aired live on the Fox Broadcasting Company (FOX) since 1996. The show was nominated for a total of eight Image Awards. Dulé Hill received nominations seven straight years, usually for "Outstanding Actor in a Comedy Series", and writers Saladin K. Patterson and James Roday received a nomination for their work on the episode "High Top Fade Out". The series never won an Image Award.

NAACP Image Awards and nominations received by Psych
Year	Category	Nominee	Result	Ref.
2008	Outstanding Actor in a Comedy Series	Dulé Hill	Nominated	
2009	Outstanding Supporting Actor in a Comedy Series	Dulé Hill	Nominated	
2010	Outstanding Actor in a Comedy Series	Dulé Hill	Nominated	
2010	Outstanding Writing in a Comedy Series	Saladin K. Patterson; James Roday for "High Top Fade Out"	Nominated	
2011	Outstanding Actor in a Comedy Series	Dulé Hill	Nominated	
2012	Outstanding Actor in a Comedy Series	Dulé Hill	Nominated	
2013	Outstanding Actor in a Drama Series	Dulé Hill	Nominated	
2014	Outstanding Actor in a Comedy Series	Dulé Hill	Nominated	

== Imagen Awards ==
The Imagen Awards are organized by the Imagen Foundation and have been held annually since 1985. The accolades "recognize and reward positive portrayals of Latinos in all forms of media" and encourage and recognize the achievements of Latinos in the entertainment and communications industries". The show received three Imagen Award nominations, all coming for James Roday's portrayal of Shawn Spencer. Roday won the award for best television actor in 2012.

Imagen Awards and nominations received by Psych
Year	Category	Nominee	Result	Ref.
2009	Best Actor–Television	James Roday	Nominated	
2011	Best Actor–Television	James Roday	Nominated	
2012	Best Actor–Television	James Roday	Won	

== NAMIC Vision Awards ==
The NAMIC Vision Awards are organized annually by the National Association for Multi-ethnicity in Communications (NAMIC) and are given for "outstanding achievements in original, multi-ethnic cable programming". The awards were first presented in 1994. Dulé Hill was nominated twice for the best performance in a comedy series. He lost the first time to Carlos Mencia and the second time to Tracy Morgan.

NAMIC Vision Awards and nominations received by Psych
Year	Category	Nominee	Result	Ref.
2007	Best Actor–Comedy	Dulé Hill for "Spellingg Bee"	Nominated	
2010	Best Performance–Comedy	Dulé Hill	Nominated	

== People's Choice Awards ==
The People's Choice Awards are presented yearly by CBS. The awards were inaugurated in 1975 and recognize the best works of the previous year, as selected by the vote of the public. The series received back-to-back nominations for favorite cable TV series, losing the first time and beating the previous year's winner, Awkward, the second time.

People's Choice Awards and nominations received by Psych
Year	Category	Nominee	Result	Ref.
2013	Favorite Cable TV Comedy	Psych	Nominated	
2014	Favorite Cable TV Comedy	Psych	Won	

== Satellite Awards ==
Formerly known as the Golden Satellite Awards, the Satellite Awards are annually presented by the International Press Academy. Inaugurated in 1997, the awards are presented for both film and television, honoring works that "are commonly noted in entertainment industry journals and blogs". The awards ceremony is held in Los Angeles, and the nominees are decided by registered members of the Press Academy. Psych received one nomination for James Roday's acting. Roday did not win the award.

Satellite Awards and nominations received by Psych
Year	Category	Nominee	Result	Ref.
2006	Best Actor in a Series, Comedy or Musical	James Roday	Nominated	

== Young Artist Awards ==
The Young Artist Awards, formerly known as the Youth in Film Awards, are presented annually by the Young Artist Association. The awards honor outstanding performances by young performers in films and television and provide scholarships for other artists. Performers are eligible to receive a nomination if they are under 21. The awards have been presented since 1979 and are held in Studio City, California. The series received two nominations. Calum Worthy was nominated for his guest performances in two episodes, and David Gore received a nomination for his appearance in "Not Even Close... Encounters". Neither received the respective awards.

Young Artist Awards and nominations received by Psych
Year	Category	Nominee	Result	Ref.
2008	Best Performance in a TV Series – Recurring Young Actor	Calum Worthy for "If You're So Smart, Then Why Are You Dead?" and "Shawn vs. The Red Phantom"	Nominated	
2011	Best Performance in a TV Series – Guest Starring Young Actor 11–13	David Gore for "Not Even Close... Encounters"	Nominated	
