= Jerry Horan =

American labor leader (1886–1937)

- Born: May , 1886
- Died: April 27, 1937; Chicago, Illinois, U.S.
- Occupations: Labor leader President, Building Service Employees International Union
- Spouse: Nonie Corbett
- Children: Helen Horan Curran

Jeremiah J. Horan (aka Jerry Horan) (May 1886-April 28, 1937) was an organized crime figure and President of the Building Service Employees International Union from 1927 until his death in 1937. Although praised by newspapers for reducing the level of overt violence and graft which plagued the union under his predecessor, William Quesse, Horan nonetheless still engaged in bribery, extortion, physical intimidation, and other crimes, and permitted George Scalise (his successor) to enter and rise within the organization. Horan established the kickback scheme whereby Scalise would eventually loot the union treasury of millions of dollars in member dues.

== Early years ==
Jerry Horan was born to John and Mary Horan McLeod in May 1886. He was one of eight children, and raised a Roman Catholic.

He married the former Nonie Corbett, and the couple had a daughter, Helen.

He became a lifelong member of the Loyal Order of Moose, the Knights of Columbus, and the Benevolent and Protective Order of Elks.

== Early organized crime involvement ==
By the time he was in his mid 30s, Jerry Horan had been heavily involved in organized crime for several years. He owned a saloon near the corner of South Wood Street and West Van Buren Street in Chicago (the site is now a parking lot opposite Malcolm X College). Horan led a gang of bombers, gunmen and "sluggers" (men who would beat others to intimidate them) which was in the employ of various organized crime outfits and labor unions. Among his clients were mobster and labor leader Timothy "Big Tim" Murphy, mobster Fred Mader, and mobster and labor leader Cornelius Shea (who was international president of the International Brotherhood of Teamsters).

Horan was hired by his uncle, BSEIU President William Quesse, as an organizer in 1921. His primary job, however, was to act as Quesse's chauffeur.

On May 6, 1922, Horan, Shea, Murphy, and five other labor leaders and labor racketeers were arrested and charged with the murder of a Chicago police officer. Horan was accidentally released, and went into hiding—although the press reported that he had turned state's evidence and been freed for rendering assistance. On May 24, the state asked for nolle prosequi and the court agreed to withdraw the indictments. Horan was indicted a second time a short time later on the same charges. Although Horan was later identified by eyewitness testimony as a co-conspirator with Murphy, Shea and Mader in planning bombings, murders, and beatings, the state withdrew these charges as well.

By 1924, Horan had become a Republican and was active in GOP politics in Illinois, supporting Governor Len Small.

== BSEIU presidency ==
Oscar Nelson, who had succeeded Quesse as president of BSEIU in February 1927, resigned his union office for health reasons on September 3, 1927. Jerry Horan was formally elected Nelson's successor on September 6, 1927. Horan's brother-in-law, local Sheet Metal Workers' International Association president William J. "Wild Bill" Rooney—an alleged murderer and noted crime figure in the city—engineered Horan's accession to the union presidency.

Horan quickly began a campaign of Americanism in BSEIU, pushing his members to learn English and become American citizens.

By the fall of 1929, his political fortunes within the American Federation of Labor (AFL) had risen to the point where he was named a member of the AFL delegation to the annual meeting of the British Trades Union Congress.

Horan's political activity also continued. He took over the Cook County Wage Earner's League, a quasi-political action committee established by William Quesse in 1924 to promote pro-labor candidates for office. He was a prominent supporter of Republican William "Big Bill" Thompson during his successful run for Mayor of Chicago in 1927, and was elected chairman of the Republican Party's 27th Ward Committee in November 1929. He backed Republican Governor Louis Emmerson's plan to pass a state constitutional amendment legalizing an income tax, and supported Charles W. Brooks in that candidate's unsuccessful run as the Republican candidate for governor of Illinois in 1936. However, Horan used the Wage Earners' League to not only promote candidates for office (allegedly through intimidation and vote-rigging) but also to run an illegal gambling operation near Chicago City Hall.

New member organizing was initially not very high on Horan's list of priorities. He established a union of maids and butlers in December 1927, but shuttered it less than six months later. He also established a council of trade union leaders to identify and respond to the open shop movement, but the council never engaged in any activity.

=== Organized crime infiltration of BSEIU ===
Although Horan won praise from Chicago newspapers for eliminating the worst and most obvious forms of violence, intimidation, and graft in the union, his ties to organized crime actually deepened. Horan's uncle, "Wild Bill" Rooney, had virtually taken control of the BSEIU's Chicago locals with Horan's approval within by the end of 1928. In 1933, Horan was accused by former Illinois Attorney General Edward J. Brundage of consorting with gangster Al Capone and seeking to improperly influence James H. Wilkerson, the judge overseeing Capone's 1931 tax evasion trial.

Horan, however, initially attempted to avoid being put under the influence of Capone and his Chicago Outfit. Capone sought control BSEIU in order to embezzle funds from the national union's treasury. But Big Tim Murphy had been gunned down in 1928, leaving Horan without protection. Horan could not turn to Chicago Mayor Bill Thompson, either, for Thompson was closely linked to the Capone mob. Although labor leaders like the now-deceased William Rooney had broken with Thompson, Horan had not—and could not expect Thompson to protect him from Capone. In desperation, Horan moved to Chicago's northwest suburbs in the late 1920s in an attempt to escape Capone's influence. But when Capone sought him out again, Horan turned to bootlegger and gangster Roger Touhy, who controlled Chicago's northwest suburbs and was already engaged in a battle with Capone. According to Touhy and other sources, Horan and leaders of the Teamsters, Painters and other unions approached Touhy in 1929 and sought protection from Capone. Horan brought $125,000 in cash (raised from the union leaders) to buy Touhy's assistance, which Touhy agreed to provide.

But after Wild Bill Rooney's murder in March 1931, a frightened Horan (who was terrified even of his own bodyguards) made peace with Capone. In April 1933, Horan met with North Side Gang member Ted Newberry and turned over control of BSEIU over to Capone—taking his day-to-day orders from Murray "The Camel" Humphreys, Capone's liaison to unions.

In 1934, the Capone mob forced Horan to hire George Scalise as a union organizer. Scalise, a 38-year-old from New York City, had been involved in interstate prostitution, labor racketeering and other organized crime activities since the early 1920s. A protégé of Anthony "Little Augie Pisano" Carfano, a former Capone associate who had moved to New York City and joined what was then known as the Luciano crime family, Scalise had used his mob connections to establish several small union locals with the Teamsters. With Carfano's help, he then built several large locals of building janitors and elevator operators, began skimming members' dues and receiving kickbacks from employers, and then affiliated the locals with the BSEIU. In 1934, Scalise asked Carfano to use his Chicago Outfit connections to help Scalise become the Eastern Representative for BSEIU, a position which put him in control of all BSEIU locals on the East Coast. Horan agreed to the deal, and Scalise was not only appointed to the position but Scalise also received 50 percent of the dues from any newly organized members in the East. In 1935, when the Fifth Vice President position on the BSEIU Board of Directors opened up due to a retirement, Scalise worked with Carfano and Horan to win appointment to the position.

Despite Horan's deepening relationship with organized crime, he was warmly embraced by the AFL. In December 1935, AFL President William Green was the keynote speaker at a testimonial dinner in Horan's honor.

Because of Horan's mob connections, BSEIU grew tremendously during Horan's presidency. The mob received more money the more union members there were, so there was every incentive to bring in new members. Mob enforcers intimidated employers into permitting unionization of their employees, and existing locals swelled with members while new locals proliferated. BSEIU grew from 10,000 members in 1932 to 40,000 members in 1936 and 75,000 members in 1939.

The union also grew through affiliations. Many of these affiliations were coerced, however. In one notorious case, Horan raided a Chicago local of the International Union of Elevator Constructors led by Matthew Taylor. Horan wanted the elevator operators to support strikes by building workers, and he wanted Taylor's union in BSEIU. Horan sent mobster Louis Schiavone to threaten Taylor in 1936, but this tactic failed. In early 1937, Horan and mobster Louis Campagna met Taylor at the Bismarck Hotel (171 West Randolph Street in Chicago) and offered him $50,000 in cash to voluntarily affiliate his union with BSEIU. Taylor refused the offer. Horan kept up the pressure on Taylor in various ways, and Taylor finally gave in. Horan arranged for Taylor to meet with Oscar Nelson, George Scalise, Harry Bates (president of the Bricklayers union), and AFL President William Green after a meeting of the AFL executive council in Atlantic City, New Jersey, in August 1937. At the meeting, Green told Taylor that the AFL also believed the elevator operators should affiliate with BSEIU. Convinced that Horan had managed to intimidate even the powerful AFL president, Taylor agreed to affiliate his local with BSEIU in September 1937. Green and Nelson later denied that any such meeting had occurred.

=== New York City strike ===
A major event during Horan's presidency was a strike that BSEIU conducted in 1936 in New York City. But despite being International President, Horan played only a minor role in the strike. The strike began on March 1, 1936, with the union seeking a closed shop and a $2-a-week pay increased. Although only 5,000 workers initially walked off the job, five days later another 11,000 BSEIU members had joined them. The strike was so important and widespread that Mayor Fiorello H. La Guardia became personally involved in the negotiations. On March 6, the strike spread to 17 hotels in New York City in addition to the 1,964 apartment buildings which were affected.

Horan did not become publicly involved in the strike until the fifth day. He issued no press releases, made no speeches, and pledged no support. When Horan finally did make a statement, he pledged to lead all building workers nationwide out on strike in support of the New York City workers. His statement was considered so preposterous, however, that a day later he withdrew his promise and said that BSEIU would merely pledge "unlimited" funds to support the strike (yet another claim few believed). Horan attempted to fly to New York City on March 6 to personally take charge of the strike, but he was forced to divert his chartered flight to Boston after New York City authorities declared the city closed to him.

On the sixth day of the strike it became clear that George Scalise and not Jerry Horan was in control of BSEIU. Scalise forced the owners of 45 buildings to settle on his terms late on March 6. The press, meanwhile, accused Horan of being in cahoots with Al Capone and recently deceased Louis "Two Guns" Alterie, forcing Horan to stay in Boston in order to avoid tainting the strikers' cause. Horan weakly claimed that he had purposefully flown to Boston to avoid any appearance that the strike was being run from Chicago and not New York. The strike spread to another 50 hotels on March 8 as Scalise announced that the union had signed another 1,814 apartment buildings to contracts. Local union officials said it would not look good if the strike were perceived to be led from Chicago.

On March 9, both sides agreed to settle the strike—which still affected more than 300 buildings out of more than 2,195 struck—by arbitration (a proposal the union had made on March 2). Mayor LaGuardia was named the arbitrator, and within 24 hours he proposed a "preferential shop." This time, Horan was at least consulted before the arbitration proposal was agreed to. But when the employers balked at LaGuardia's solution, the strike continued. Scalise struck all buildings and hotels around Grand Central Station and Times Square on March 10 (adding another 300 buildings to those struck, bringing the total to more than 2,500). The strike's expansion proved too much for the employers, and an agreement on the union's terms was reached on March 14.

== Death ==
In April 1937, Horan fell seriously ill and was thought to be dying. Scalise contacted Carfano, who agreed to try to have Scalise appointed president of BSEIU if Horan died.

The week before Horan's death, a group of gangsters—which included Mike Carozza, Frank Diamond, Charles Fischetti, and labor racketeer Thomas J. Burke—met with George Scalise at the Café Capri restaurant at 123 North Clark Street in Chicago (a favorite hangout of Chicago Outfit leader Frank Nitti). The meeting had been called to decide who should be the next president of the BSEIU in the event of Horan's death. The conspirators supported Burke, who was the Third Vice President of BSEIU, and a well-known labor racketeer. Burke had the backing of a majority of the mob figures, but the group felt he would be opposed by a majority of the BSEIU Board of Directors due to his public ties with organized crime. William McFetridge, BSEIU First Vice President, was believed to be the choice of the Board. McFetridge was known for his scrupulous honesty, and although he had served on the Board for many years he was a figurehead and not part of the mob's inner circle of decision-makers. The mob, however, felt he was not acceptable because he was not under the control of organized crime. During the meeting, the conspirators settled on Scalise as Horan's successor. Scalise's ties to the Chicago Outfit were not well known to the members of the Board or the public, and this became the reason why he was chosen as the compromise candidate. The mob council told Scalise he would draw a salary of $1,000 a month, and he was told to kick back $500 a month to the Chicago Outfit. Scalise later denied being at the meeting as well as knowing Fischetti or Burke, but union documents proved him wrong.

On April 20, 1937, Jerry Horan was removed by ambulance from his apartment home at the Cornelia Apartments at 3500 N. Lake Shore Drive and taken to Passavant Hospital. Jerry Horan died there on April 27, 1937, of liver failure.

Five thousand people attended his funeral at Our Lady of Mount Carmel Church in Chicago. He was buried at Calvary Cemetery, where more than 30 automobiles were needed to deliver flowers to the grave.

The afternoon of the funeral, the BSEIU board of directors met to elect the next president of the union. Included in the meeting were First Vice President McFetridge; Second Vice President Gus Van Heck; Third Vice President Burke; Fourth Vice President Charles Hardy; Fifth Vice President Scalise; Secretary-Treasurer Paul David; and International Union Trustee Elizabeth Grady. Also in attendance was Oscar Nelson, now a circuit court judge. Nelson put forward Scalise's name, and George Scalise was elected president of the Building Service Employees International Union.

== Notes ==
Preceded by Oscar Nelson	President of Service Employees International Union; 1927-1937	Succeeded by George Scalise
