= Purington =

Family name

Purington is a surname.

Notable people with the name include:

- C. W. Purington, geologist who co-discovered the Purington Shale, a geological formation in Illinois
- Carl Purington Rollins (1880–1960), American printer
- Elisha Purington, American clockmaker, builder and first resident of the Elisha Purington House
- Florence Purington (1862–1950), American academic, first dean of Mount Holyoke College
- Louise C. Purington (1844–1916), American physician and temperance movement leader
- William Purington Cole Jr. (1889–1957), American jurist and Congressman
- Dillwyn V. Purington, politician and co-founder of Purington Paving Brick Company
- William C. Purington, co-founder of Purington Paving Brick Company
