= Edward C. Curtis =

American politician

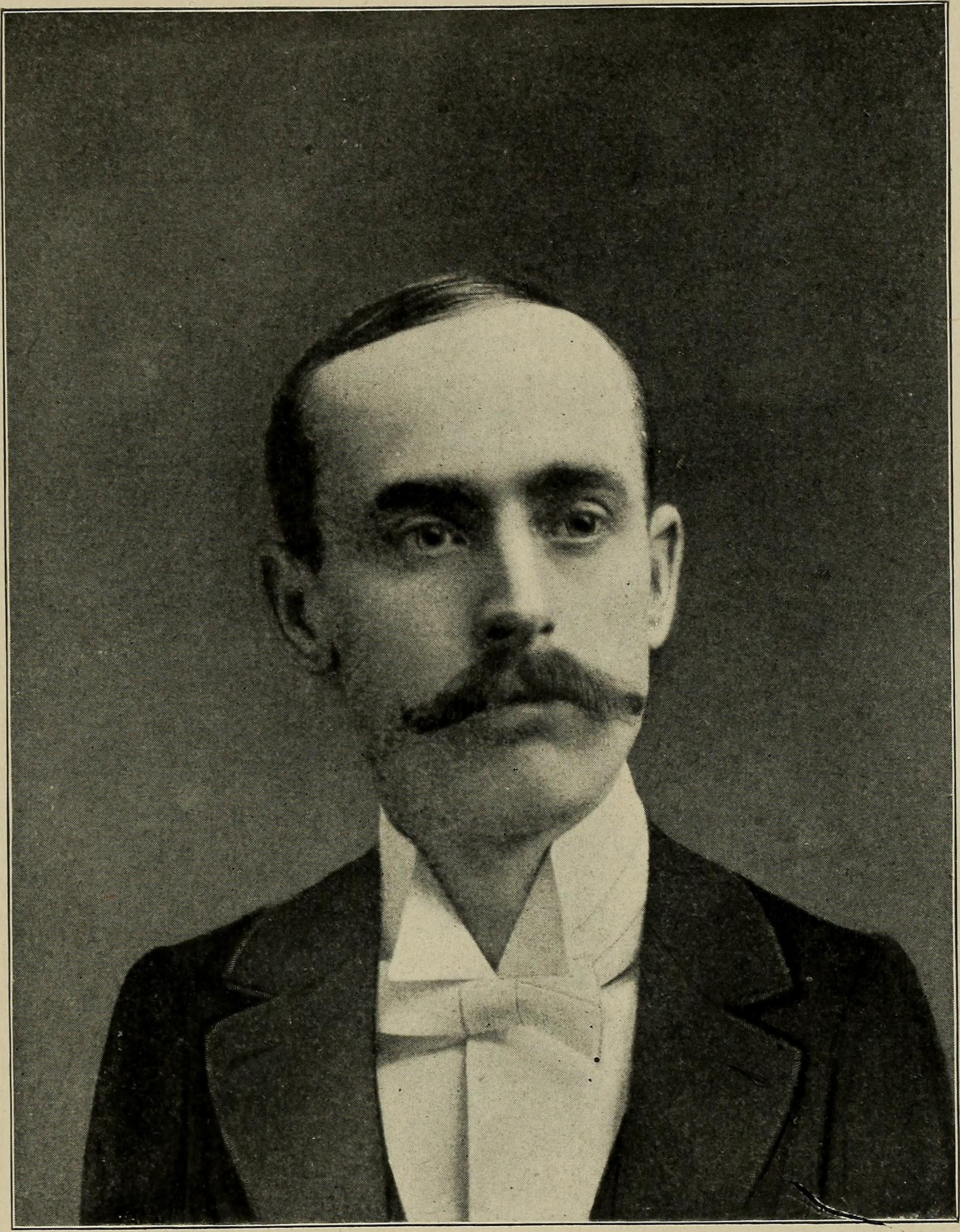

Member of the Illinois Senate from the 20th district
- In office 1904 – 1920
- Preceded by: Len Small
- Succeeded by: Richard R. Meents

Member of the Illinois House of Representatives from the 20th district
- In office 1902 – 1904
- Preceded by: re-districted

Member of the Illinois House of Representatives from the 16th district
- In office 1894 – 1902
- Preceded by: Daniel H. Paddock
- Succeeded by: re-districted

Personal details
- Born: August 12, 1865 Yellowhead Township, Kankakee County, Illinois
- Died: March 8, 1920 (aged 54)
- Party: Republican
- Spouse: M. Etha Griffin (m. 1897)
- Children: 2
- Profession: Banker

Edward C. Curtis (August 12, 1865 – March 8, 1920) was an American politician from Illinois. Born and raised in Kankakee County, Curtis attended DePauw and Northwestern Universities before assuming control of his father's store in Grant Park. Curtis rose through state politics, serving on the Illinois House of Representatives from 1894 to 1904, then on the Illinois Senate until his death in 1920. Curtis served as Speaker of the House from 1896 to 1898 and was a delegate to the 1920 constitutional convention.

== Biography ==
Edward C. Curtis was born in Yellowhead Township, Kankakee County, Illinois, on August 12, 1865. He attended public schools near Grant Park, Illinois, and then matriculated at DePauw University. He later graduated from Northwestern University. He returned to Grant Park to take control of his father's store. Curtis added a banking department, later organized as the Grant Park Bank with Curtis as cashier. The bank grew quickly and was organized as a national bank in 1898.

Curtis was a Republican from a young age and was nominated for the Illinois House of Representatives on behalf of the party in 1894. Two years later, he was re-elected and then was unanimously elected Speaker of the House, making him the youngest to hold the position to this point. Although he was re-elected to the house in 1898, he did not return as Speaker. Curtis represented his district in the House until 1904, when he was elected to the Illinois Senate. Curtis succeeded Len Small, who was elected as Illinois Treasurer. He served in the upper house until his death in 1920. Curtis was an advocate for a constitutional convention, first proposing it in 1907 and then introducing a resolution in every session until it was approved in 1917. He was a delegate to the 1920 convention, but did not survive to see it offered to voters.

Curtis married M. Etha Griffin in 1897. They had two children. Curtis died from pneumonia on March 8, 1920.
