= William Quesse =

American labor leader

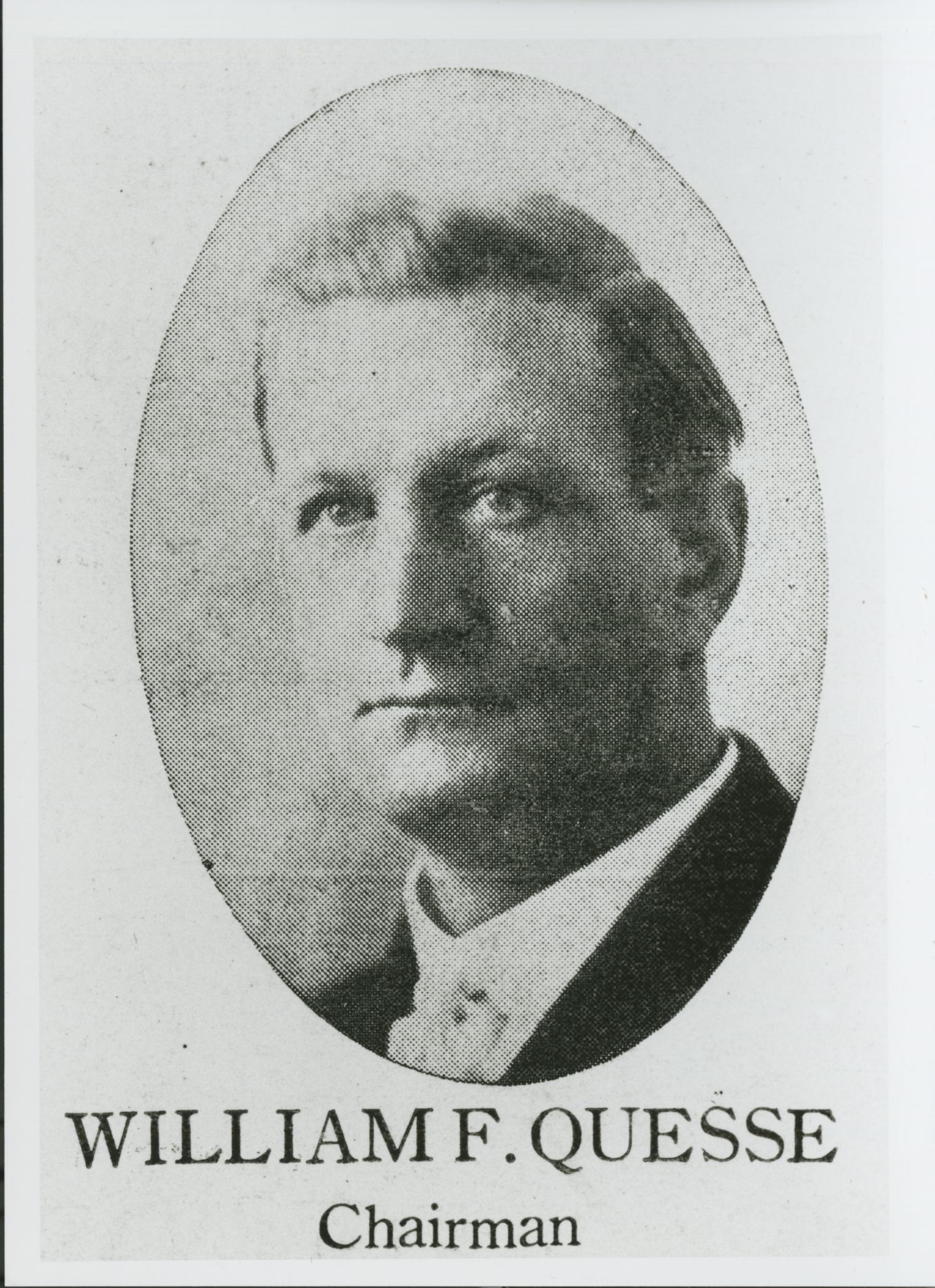
- Quesse in the Chicago Flat Janitors' Union Yearbook, 1918

1st President of the Service Employees International Union
- In office 1921–1927
- Succeeded by: Oscar Nelson

Personal details
- Born: William Frederick Quesse; April 4, 1878 Chebanse, Illinois, U.S.
- Died: February 16, 1927 (aged 48)
- Spouse: Margaret A. Pankau (m. 1901)
- Children: William; Catherine
- Parents: Christopher Quesse; Elsie Haake
- Relatives: William McFetridge
- Occupation: Labor leader
- Known for: labor movement
- Nickname: Bill

William Frederick Quesse (April 4, 1878 – February 16, 1927) was an American labor leader and president of the Building Service Employees International Union, the precursor of the Service Employees International Union, from 1921 to 1927. He was the union's founding president.

== Early life ==
Quesse was born to German immigrants Christopher (or Christian) Quesse and Elsie Quesse (née Haake) in Chebanse, Illinois. They had ten children, only seven of whom survived to adulthood: Christian, Henry, Minnie, Dorothea, William (Bill), Emily, and George. He married the former Margaret Anna Pankau, and the couple had three children.

Quesse founded a union of 200 apartment janitors in 1902. The union quickly folded, however. Undeterred, Quesse founded the Chicago Flat Janitor's Union in 1912. Quesse was elected president.

In 1921, Quesse led six other janitors' unions in Chicago in forming the Building Service Employees International Union (BSEIU). The new union immediately received a charter from the American Federation of Labor.

== BSEIU and presidency ==
The union led a strike in 1917 which led to retention of contracts but little economic advancement.

A second labor dispute erupted in 1920. Initially, Quesse agreed to arbitration as a way of ending the wage impasse, but the arbitrator ruled for no pay increase. The union undertook a pressure campaign against the employers. The Employers' Association of Chicago initiated an anti-union campaign aimed at BSEIU, and not only resisted the union's organizing efforts but began an active public relations, legal, and media campaign to break the union. As the organizing drive continued throughout 1920 and 1921, both sides undertook a program of bombings, beatings, intimidation, extortion, and bribery.

A 1921 indictment resulted in a hung jury. In 1922, 10 union leaders, including Quesse, were indicted a second time on an array of charges, including extortion and conspiracy to bomb buildings.

On June 8, 1922, Quesse and the other BSEIU leadership were convicted of conspiracy and sentenced to one to five years in prison. In 1924, Quesse was pardoned by Republican Governor Len Small. Defenders of the convicts claim law enforcement officials ignored evidence of employer crimes after the employers' association pressured city officials to break the union and used the public relations campaign to whip up anti-union public sentiment. The employer organization's campaign against BSEIU continued, but the union's extensive political activity (Quesse had founded the Cook County Wage Earners' League to act as a political action committee for labor unions in the city) prior to the organizing drive had won it supporters in City Hall. Quesse's ties to Republican Mayor William Hale Thompson helped protect the union.

The state again attempted to indict Quesse in 1924, but nothing came of the charges as Quesse's political backers helped quash the indictment.

== Death ==
In the last three years of his life, Quesse built BSEIU into the most powerful labor union in Chicago. His political influence grew not only throughout the city, but the state of Illinois as well.

Quesse fell ill with cancer in late 1926. In January 1927, he was hospitalized at Columbus Memorial Hospital. After his condition was recognized as terminal, he was allowed to return home on February 13. He died at 1:00 a.m. on the morning of February 16.

== BSEIU successors ==
Quesse's close friend, Chicago City Alderman Oscar Nelson, who was at his side when he died, was named interim president of BSEIU. Jerry Horan, a BSEIU organizer whose primary job was to act as Quesse's chauffeur, was elected Quesse's successor as BSEIU president on September 6, 1927. William McFetridge, Quesse's nephew, became president of BSEIU in 1940.

== Notes ==
Preceded by Founding President	President of Service Employees International Union; 1921-1927	Succeeded by Oscar Nelson
