= Senator Hamilton =

Senator Hamilton may refer to:

== Members of the United States Senate ==
- Adam Hamilton (pastor) (born 1964), U.S. Senator-elect from Kansas
- Morgan C. Hamilton (1809–1893), U.S. Senator from Texas from 1870 to 1877
- William Thomas Hamilton (1820–1888), U.S. Senator from Maryland from 1869 to 1875

== United States state senate members ==
- Bill Hamilton (West Virginia politician) (born 1950), West Virginia State Senate
- Charles Mann Hamilton (1874–1942), New York State Senate
- Clark Hamilton (1899–1980), Idaho State Senate
- Cornelius S. Hamilton (1821–1867), Ohio State Senate
- Darden Hamilton (born 1956), Arizona State Senate
- Eva McCall Hamilton (1871–1948), Michigan State Senate
- Isaac Miller Hamilton (1864–1952), Illinois State Senate
- James A. Hamilton (1876–1950), New York State Senate
- James E. Hamilton (born 1935), Oklahoma State Senate
- James Hamilton Jr. (1786–1857), South Carolina State Senate
- John Marshall Hamilton (1847–1905), Illinois State Senate
- John Hamilton (congressman) (1754–1837), Pennsylvania State Senate
- Jones S. Hamilton (1833–1907), Mississippi State Senate
- Joseph B. Hamilton (1817–1902), Wisconsin State Senate
- Milton H. Hamilton Jr. (1932–2008), Tennessee State Senate
- Paul Hamilton (politician) (1762–1816), South Carolina State Senate
- Robert S. Hamilton (1865–1940), Illinois State Senate
- William J. Hamilton (1932–2019), New Jersey State Senate
- Samuel Hambleton (politician) (1812–1886), Maryland State Senate
