= Ayers Bank Building =

- U.S. National Register of Historic Places
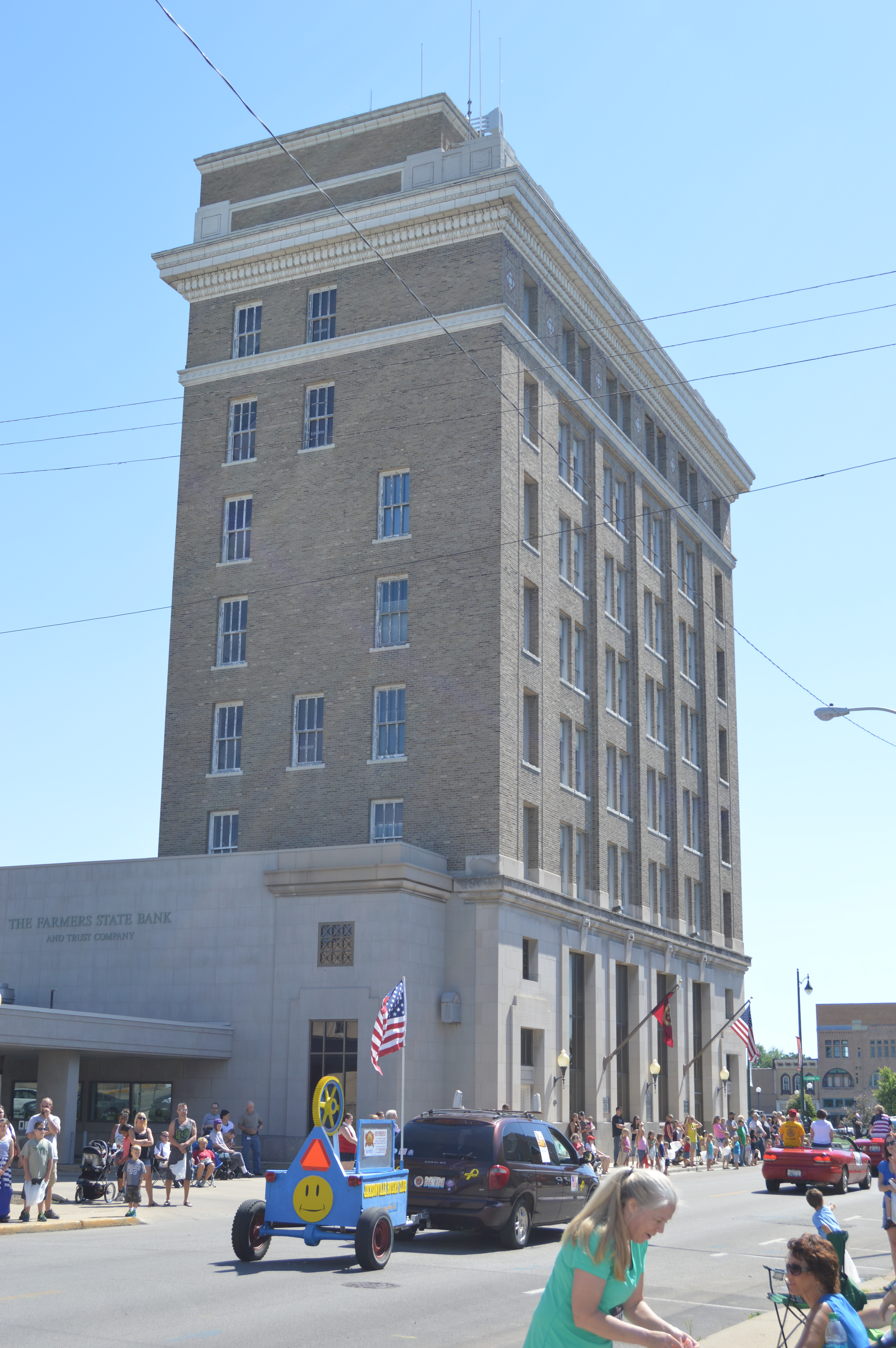

- Location within Illinois Location within the United States
- Location: 200 W. State St., Jacksonville, Illinois
- Coordinates: 39°44′4″N 90°13′49″W
- Area: 0.3 acres (0.12 ha)
- Built: 1911–1913
- Architect: Jarvis Hunt
- NRHP reference No.: 86003178
- Added to NRHP: November 20, 1986

The Ayers Bank Building is a historic bank building located at 200 West State Street in Jacksonville, Illinois. This site is believed to have been continuously associated with banking since 1832, longer than any other site in Illinois.

== History of Ayers Bank Building ==
Banking operations at the building site began with David Ayers who operated a merchant bank out of his drug store in the 1830s, and the Ayers family continued banking at this site throughout the 19th century. In 1910, when Millard Fillmore Dunlap and Andrew Russel bought a controlling interest in the business, Ayers Bank was one of the state's leading financial institutions. Dunlap and Russel hired architect Jarvis Hunt of Chicago to build the Ayers Bank Building on the same site where David Ayers had begun his banking business.

The bank continued to prosper until the 1930s, when Dunlap and Russel were convicted of illegal banking practices and went to prison. Depositors received 33 cents on the dollar and the federal government closed the bank in November 1932.

The Farmers State Bank & Trust Company bought the building for $53,000 at a foreclosure sale in 1939. The upper floors were rented to a series of dentists, physicians, and other professionals until 1985, when Farmers renovated the entire building for its exclusive use. As of 2017, the bank still has its headquarters at this site.

The building was added to the National Register of Historic Places on November 20, 1986.

== Building architecture ==
The Ayers Bank Building is the tallest building in downtown Jacksonville; it is 110 ft (34 m) tall and has eight stories. The building was the first steel-frame and reinforced concrete structure in Jacksonville. The building is in the Renaissance Revival style with a brick and cut stone exterior and a terra cotta egg-and-dart cornice.
