= John F. Smulski =

American politician

John Francis Smulski
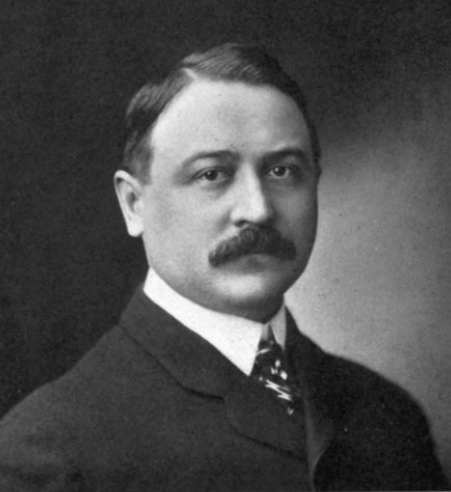

34th Treasurer of Illinois
- In office 1907–1909
- Governor: Charles S. Deneen
- Preceded by: Len Small
- Succeeded by: Andrew Russel

Personal details
- Born: February 4, 1867 Poznań, Poland
- Died: March 18, 1928 (aged 61) Chicago, Illinois, U.S.
- Resting place: St. Adalbert Cemetery
- Party: Republican
- Spouse: Harriet Mikitazynski
- Children: 2
- Education: Northwestern University School of Law
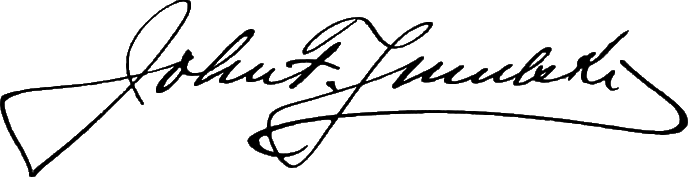
- Signature

John Francis Smulski (sometimes "Smolski"; February 4, 1867 – March 18, 1928) was a Polish-American lawyer, banker and Republican politician who served on the Chicago City Council and as Illinois Treasurer.

== Early and family life ==
Born in Poznań in Prussian Poland, Smulski emigrated with his family to the United States in either 1876 or 1881 and settled in Chicago, Illinois. Smulski attended the Chicago Public Schools and St. Jerome College in Berlin, Ontario, Canada, then the Northwestern University School of Law. He became a naturalized American citizen in 1890, and married opera singer Jadwiga (Harriet) Mikitazynski (1876–1947). They had two children who died as infants, then adopted a daughter, Harriet, and a son, John J. Smulski (1912–1932).

== Career ==
Admitted to the Illinois bar in 1889. Smulski served on the Chicago City Council as a Republican alderman for Ward 16, as well as two terms as Chicago city attorney, and (appointed) president of the West Chicago Park Commission. In 1906 Smulski founded and became president of Northwestern Trust and Savings Company of Chicago, and sat on the board of directors of several other financial institutions. Smulski served as Illinois state treasurer from 1907 to 1909. He was an unsuccessful candidate in the 1911 Republican Chicago mayoral primary.

As a 7-year-old boy, Smulski had been jailed by Prussian authorities for wearing a square cap of traditional Polish design. As an adult he became active in Polish-American affairs, including heading the Polish National Department which coordinated food and other aid during World War I. The consul in Chicago later awarded him the cross of the French Legion of Honor, and Smulski also helped Poland negotiate loans after the war.

== Death and legacy ==
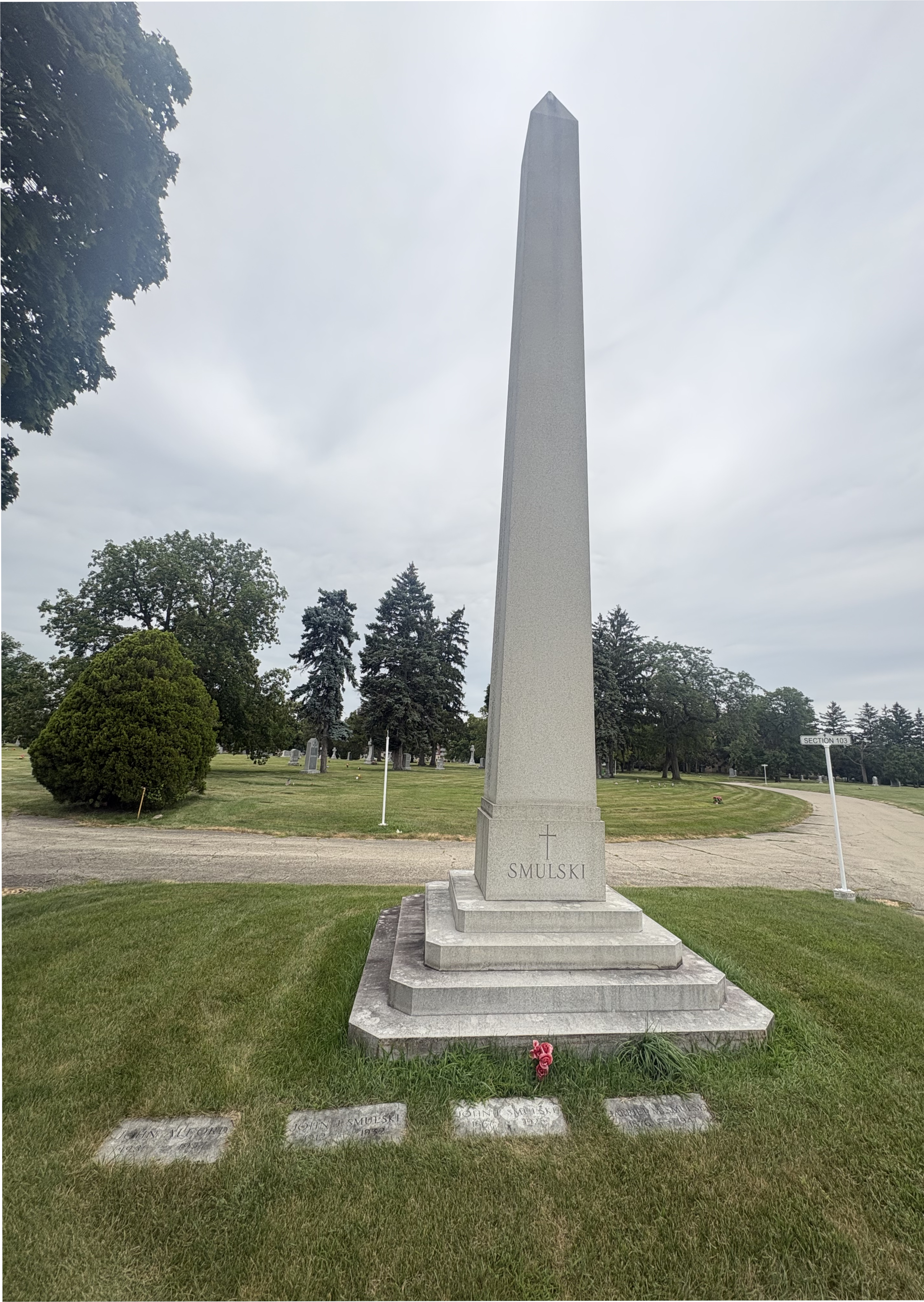
Smulski's grave at St. Adalbert Cemetery

Smulski, who in previous months had three surgeries for intestinal problems, feared he had cancer. After his wound reopened as he opened a window, he shot himself at his suite at the Seneca Hotel in Chicago on March 18, 1928. He was survived by his widow, who remarried in 1931, and adopted son, who died in 1932 and was buried beside him in St. Adalbert Cemetery in Niles, Illinois. His bank survived until 1996, when it merged into Midamerica Bank, FSB, which later merged into National City Bank of Cleveland and then PNC Financial Services.

== Notes ==
Party political offices
| Preceded by Len Small | Republican nominee for Illinois Treasurer; 1906 | Succeeded by Andrew Russel |
Political offices
| Preceded by Len Small | Treasurer of Illinois; 1907–1909 | Succeeded by Andrew Russel |
