= Andrew Russel =

American politician and banker (died 1934)

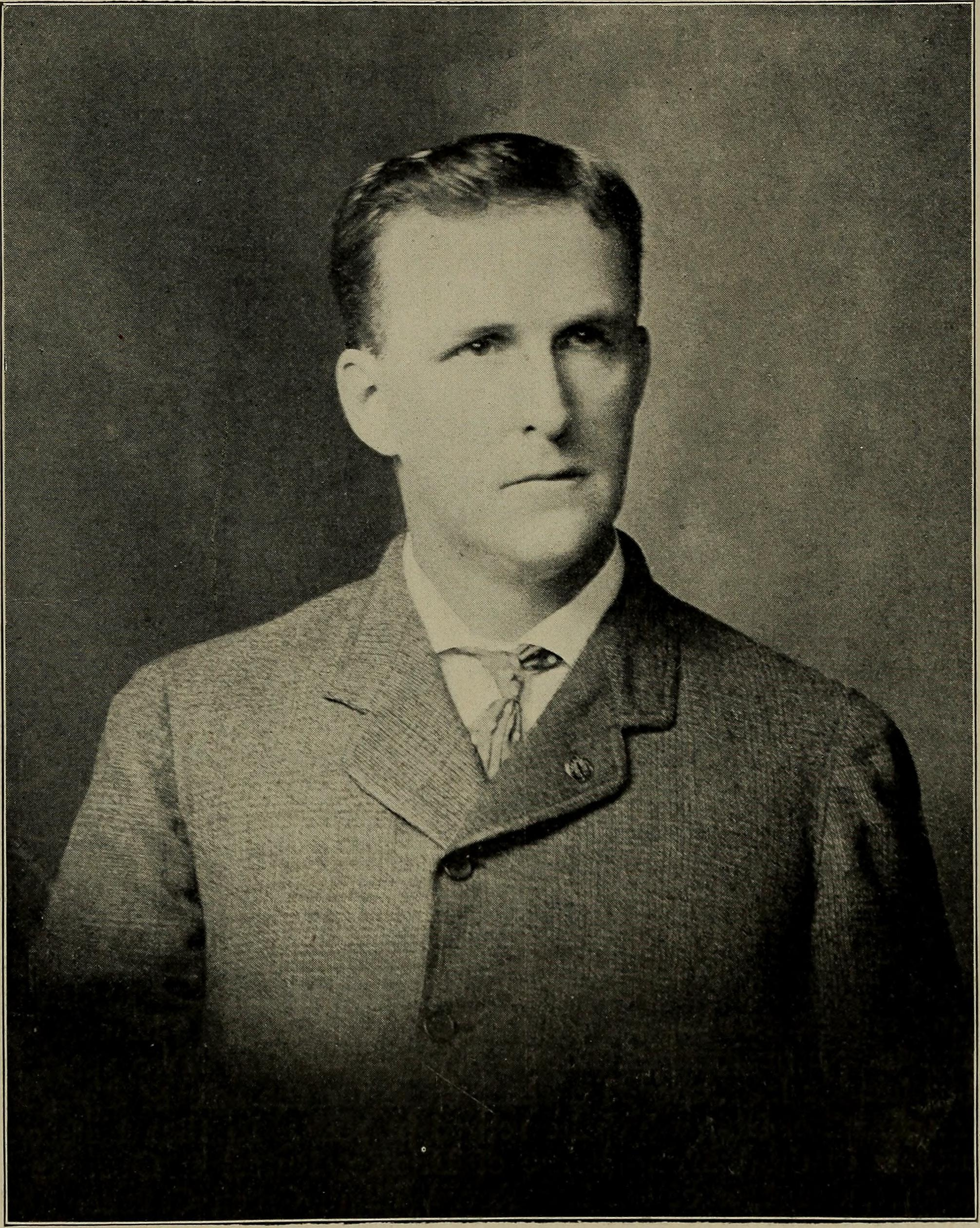

35th Treasurer of Illinois
- In office 1907–1909
- Governor: Charles S. Deneen
- Preceded by: John F. Smulski
- Succeeded by: Edward E. Mitchell

37th Treasurer of Illinois
- In office 1915–1917
- Governor: Edward F. Dunne
- Preceded by: William Ryan Jr.
- Succeeded by: Len Small

Illinois Auditor of Public Accounts
- In office 1917–1925
- Governor: Frank Orren Lowden; Len Small
- Preceded by: James J. Brady
- Succeeded by: Oscar Nelson

Personal details
- Born: Jacksonville, Illinois, U.S.
- Died: November 22, 1934 Milan, Michigan, U.S.
- Party: Republican
- Spouse: Clara Elizabeth Robbins (m. 1891)
- Children: 9
- Education: Illinois College

Andrew Russel (died November 22, 1934) was a Republican politician and banker, who twice served as Illinois Treasurer (1909–1911 and 1915–1917) and later as Illinois Auditor of Public Accounts (1917–1925), before being convicted along with his partner of illegal banking practices in 1932 and dying in prison.

== Early and family life ==
Born in Jacksonville, Illinois, the eldest son of merchant William Scott Russel (1824–1904), who had emigrated as a boy from Scotland in 1834 and his Illinois-born wife, the former Emily Kautz Gallaher (1834–1905), daughter of a Presbyterian minister. He was named for his by-then elderly grandfather Dr. Andrew Russel, who had become a leading member of the Jacksonville community and known for his anti-slavery stance and Underground Railroad activities before the American Civil War. Russel graduated from Illinois College in Jacksonville.

In Cairo, Alexander County, Illinois on November 18, 1891, he married Clara Elizabeth Robbins (1864–1948) and they had five sons (Robbins, Stuart, Andrew Lang, John Scott and Alexander Hamilton Russel) and four daughters (Miriam, Elinor, Clara Elizabeth and Sarah Kautz Russel). Son Alexander "Alex" Hamilton Russel (1908–1943) died in World War II on October 23, 1943, in Italy. He was a 1st Lieutenant in the 7th Infantry, 3rd Division, out of California. Alex is buried in a military cemetery in Rome.

== Career ==
By 1880, Russel had become a bookkeeper, though he continued to live with his parents and siblings. In 1891, with his retired father's financial help, Russel and his partner Millard Fillmore Dunlap established their own local bank, Dunlap, Russel and Company. Ayers Bank had been named after Philadelphia-trained druggist, merchant and early local banker, David Ball Ayers, who had begun banking on the Jacksonville site in the early 1830s, and his son Marshall Paul Ayers and brother Augustus E. Ayers had continued the business, but both died shortly after the turn of the century (as did William Russel). The Russel family was also prominent in Jacksonville: one brother, James Gallaher Russel (1862–1945) became a Presbyterian minister, an uncle (also Andrew Russel, 1817–1888) managed the grandfather's large farm 10 miles south of town, and two uncles, John Scott Russel (1811–1884) and George Scott Russel (1828–1914) ran the county's largest lumber yard (the J. S. and G. S. Russel Lumber Company.)

In 1910, Dunlap and Russel bought the venerable Ayers National Bank (Dunlap becoming the combined bank's president). They soon hired Chicago architect Jarvis Hunt as well as a contractor from St. Louis, and built Jacksonville's first steel frame building (and one of the largest in southern Illinois), offering seven floors of office space above the bank on the ground floor. The year after it opened, the combined Ayers National Bank also bought its rival First National Bank of Jacksonville, and the combined bank grew, reaching $9 million by 1930. Russel became an early President of the Illinois Bankers Association, as well as supervising editor of a history of banking in Illinois.

Meanwhile, Russel became active in the Republican party, following his father's and grandfather's tradition. Although he lost his initial campaigns for local circuit court clerk and state senator, Russel was appointed to the Illinois Board of Pardons, and served as chairman from 1901 to 1906. His partner, Dunlap, was (like his father, the former local sheriff) a Democrat. Dunlap was a friend of William Jennings Bryan, and served as that party's state treasurer for years as well as national treasurer, but unsuccessfully ran for the office of Illinois state treasurer in 1896. Russel successfully ran as a Republican for Illinois Treasurer in 1908, so he served from 1909 to 1911 and again from 1915 to 1917 (the second time after defeating a Democrat who had succeeded to that office). Russel then successfully ran for Illinois Auditor of Public Accounts, and also won re-election to that office, serving from 1917 to 1925. These positions presumably helped his bank become one of the depositories of Illinois state funds.

Although Ayers Bank survived the initial failures as the Great Depression began, federal banking regulators discovered Dunlap and Russel had engaged in self-dealing (improperly waiving interest on an uncreditworthy note as an asset and overdrafts to Russel's personal account). In 1932 Russel and his Dunlap were indicted and convicted of violating the National Banking Act.

== Death and legacy ==
Russel was sentenced to the federal detention farm in Milan, Michigan for eighteen months, and died there on November 22, 1934. His remains were returned to Jacksonville for burial. Depositors, including his alma mater, Illinois College, ultimately received about $.33 for every dollar they had deposited, substantially hurting the local economy. In 1939, Farmers State Bank bought the Ayers Bank Building at a foreclosure sale for $53,000. It still stands as Jacksonville's tallest building (and has been the Farmers State Bank headquarters since 1941). It may be the oldest site continually occupied by a bank in Illinois, and since 1986 has been listed on the National Register of Historic Places.

== Notes ==
Party political offices
Preceded by John F. Smulski	Republican nominee for Illinois Treasurer; 1908	Succeeded by Edward E. Mitchell
Preceded by Edward E. Mitchell	Republican nominee for Illinois Treasurer; 1912, 1914	Succeeded by Len Small
Preceded by James S. McCullough	Republican nominee for Illinois Auditor of Public Accounts; 1916, 1920	Succeeded by Oscar Nelson
Political offices
Preceded by John F. Smulski	Treasurer of Illinois; 1909–1911	Succeeded by Edward E. Mitchell
Preceded by William Ryan, Jr.	Treasurer of Illinois; 1915–1917	Succeeded by Len Small
Preceded by James J. Brady	Illinois Auditor of Public Accounts; 1917–1925	Succeeded by Oscar Nelson
