= Garrett D. Kinney =

American politician and businessman (1869–1933)

Garrett Deforest Kinney (May 21, 1869 – August 7, 1933) was an American politician and businessman.

Born in Rensselaer County, New York, Kinney moved with his parents to Peoria, Illinois in 1874. Kinney went to the Peoria Public Schools and to Cornell University. He was involved in the manufacturing business and was also involved with banking. He was president of Culter & Proctor Stove Company and Metal Barrel Corporation. He was involved with the Republican. Kinney served as Illinois State Treasurer from 1927 to 1929. Kinney died in Peoria, Illinois on August 7, 1933, after shooting himself on June 23, 1933. Kinney was being investigated for taking Illinois state monies while director of Illinois State Finances under Governor Louis Lincoln Emmerson.

== Notes ==
Party political offices
Preceded by Omer N. Custer	Republican nominee for Illinois Treasurer; 1926	Succeeded by Omer N. Custer
Political offices
Preceded by Omer N. Custer	Treasurer of Illinois; 1927–1929	Succeeded by Omer N. Custer
