= Elisha Purington House =

Historic house in Maine, United States

- U.S. National Register of Historic Places
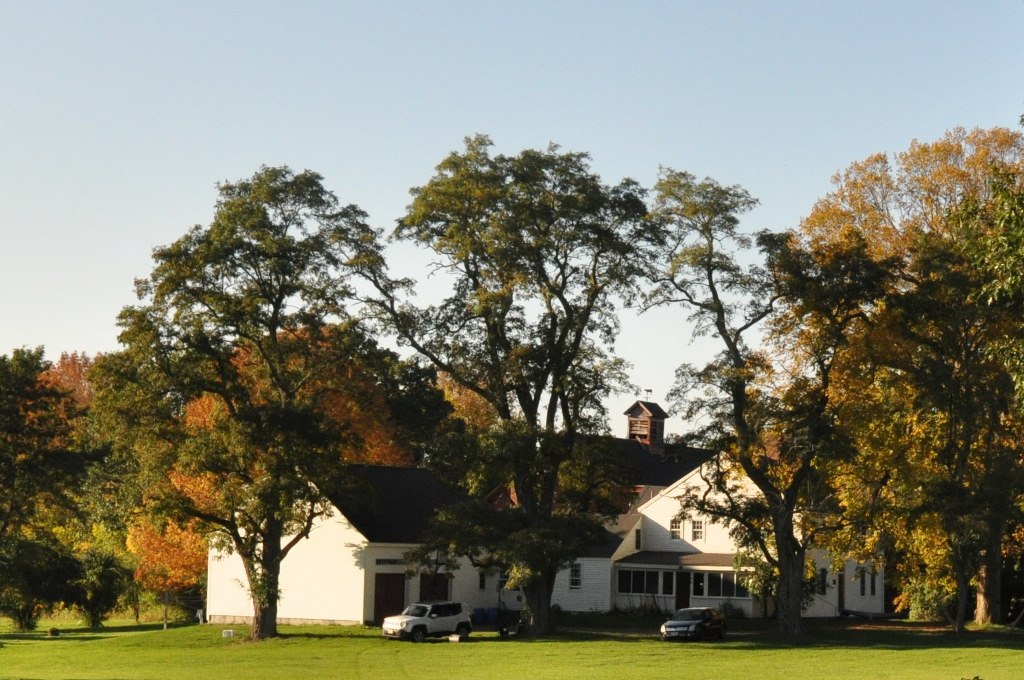

- Location within Maine Location within the United States
- Location: 71 Mast Rd., Falmouth, Maine
- Coordinates: 43°45′52″N 70°20′38″W
- Area: 0.5 acres (0.20 ha)
- Built: 1761
- Architect: Elisha Purington
- Architectural style: Georgian
- NRHP reference No.: 85000271
- Added to NRHP: February 14, 1985

The Elisha Purington House also known as Pride Farm, is an historic house at 71 Mast Road in Falmouth, Maine. Built in 1761, it is a rare surviving example of Georgian architecture in Maine's rural interior. It was listed on the National Register of Historic Places on February 14, 1985.

== Description and history ==
The Purington House stands in the northwestern interior reaches of Falmouth, on the west side of Mast Road, a short way south of Pride Farm Road. The main house is a 2 1/2-story timber-frame structure, with a gabled roof, central chimney, clapboard siding, and stone foundation. It has a number of additions, including a 20th-century garage and an ell joining it to a 19th-century barn. Its front facade is symmetrically arranged, with a center entrance topped by three-light transom window, and framed by a modest surround with entablature. Windows are either six-over-six or nine-over-six sash, and are framed by narrow molding, similar to that found at the building corners and in the interior. Also located on the property is an L-shaped 19th century barn.

The house was built in 1761 by Elisha Purington, a Quaker who had a reputation throughout New England as a clockmaker. He is also known to have served the local community as a blacksmith and gunmaker. The roof his recently built house was torn off during a hurricane in 1767. The assemblage of surviving 18th and 19th-century buildings is among the finest in a rural inland setting in the state.

== See also ==
- National Register of Historic Places listings in Cumberland County, Maine
- Purington
