= Charles W. Pavey =

American businessman and politician

Sketch of Pavey, circa 1892

Charles W. Pavey (November 14, 1835 – May 12, 1910) was an American businessman and politician.

Born in Highland County, Ohio, Pavey moved to Mount Vernon, Illinois, and was a merchant. During the American Civil War, Pavey served in the 80th Illinois Volunteer Infantry Regiment. President Chester Arthur appointed Pavey collector of internal revenue. He was also involved with the Republican Party. From 1889 to 1893, Pavey served as the Illinois auditor of public accounts. From 1897 to 1908, Pavey served as an examiner for the United States Department of Justice. He then returned to Mount Vernon, Illinois because of ill health. Pavey died in Mount Vernon, Illinois, after suffering a stroke.

== Notes ==
Party political offices
Preceded by Charles P. Swigart	Republican nominee for Illinois Auditor of Public Accounts; 1888, 1892	Succeeded by James S. McCullough
Political offices
Preceded by Charles P. Swigart	Illinois Auditor of Public Accounts; 1889–1893	Succeeded by David Gore
