= Purington Paving Brick Company =

Brick manufacturer

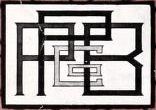
- Industry: Construction Materials
- Founded: 1890 in East Galesburg, United States of America
- Founder: Dillwyn V. Purington & William C. Purington
- Defunct: 1974
- Key people: Omer N. Custer (former president)
- Products: Bricks

Purington Paving Brick Company (also known as Purington Brick Company) was a brick manufacturer based out of East Galesburg, USA.

== History ==
=== Founding ===
In 1849, German stonemason Henry Grosscup purchased 90 acres of land from Knox College, and built a brickyard. Grosscup paid for the land by giving his first few batches of bricks to the college, which were used to construct Old Main and Whiting Hall.

=== 1890-1949 ===
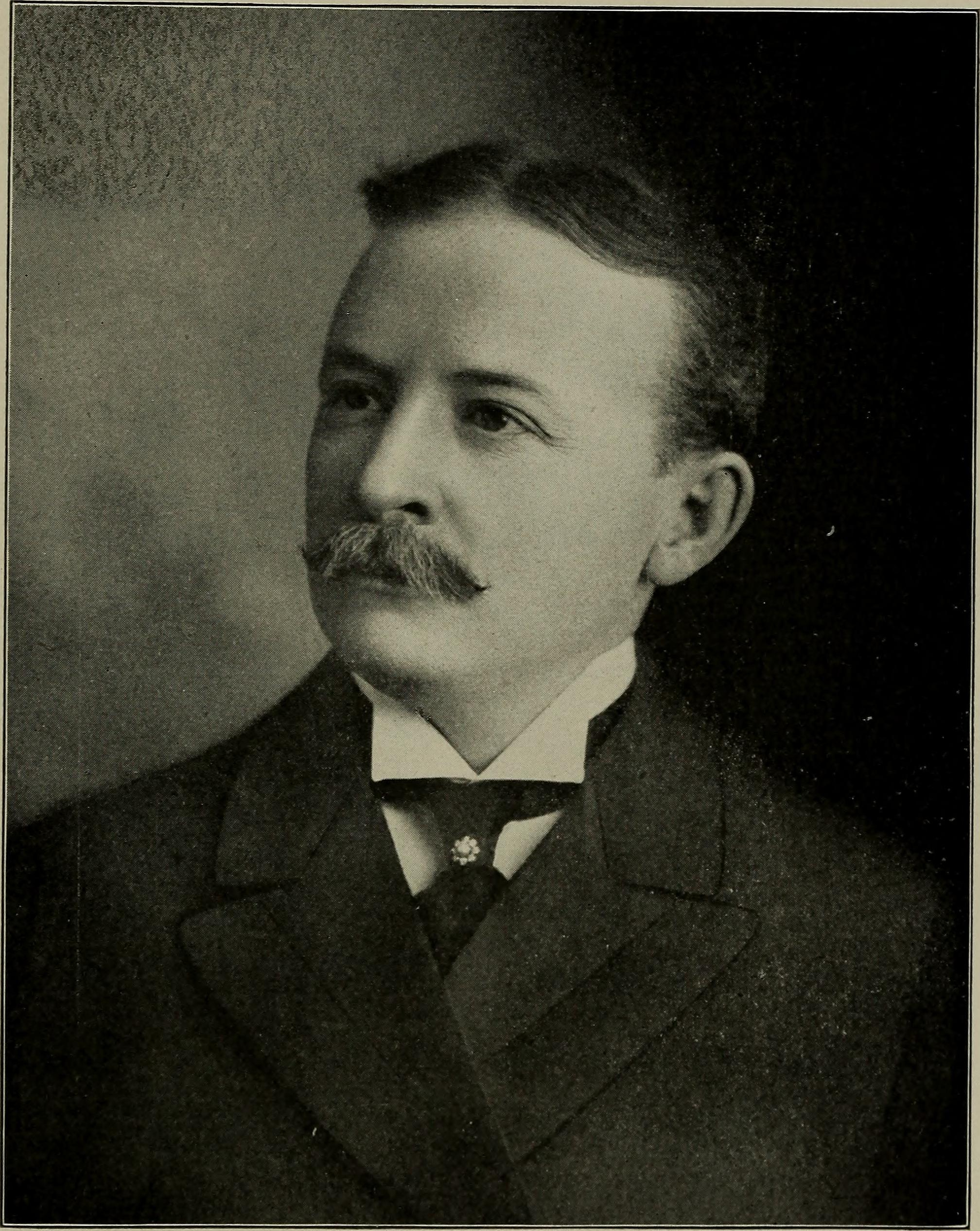
Dillwyn V. Purington

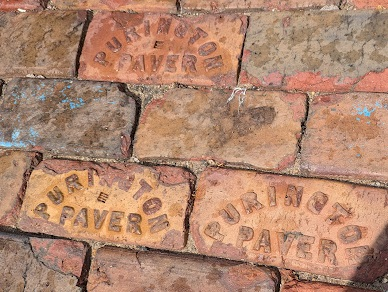
Purington Pavers

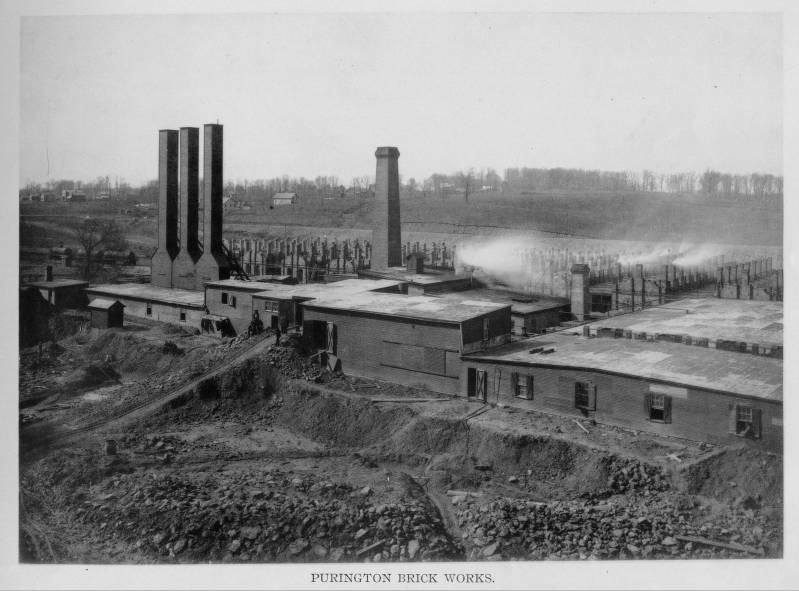
Purington Brick Works, photographed in 1895

In 1890, brothers Dillwyn V. and William S. Purington purchased Grosscup's brickyard, and established the Purington Paving Brick Company. They continued to expand their operations, and bought out several local companies: Pioneer Brick Company, Galesburg Brick Company, Galesburg Brick and Terra Cotta Company, and the Galesburg Paving Brick Company. Soon after the Puringtons bought the brickyards, they began production of the famous "Purington Pavers," which were easily identifiable by the raised text on some of the bricks. Purington Pavers were used all across the world. Although most common in the Midwest, they were used in places from Chicago to the Bazaar in Bombay, India. East Galesburg-area soldiers fighting in WWI reported seeing Purington Pavers in the streets of Paris. During the building of the Panama Canal, Purington bricks were used to pave the streets in Panama City, and roads used during construction of the canal. For Many years, it was the largest brick paver producer in the world. During its height, Purington could produce over 150,000 bricks a day.

On December 31, 1910, W.S. Purington announced he was going to sell all of his shares in the brick company. William cited health issues and a recent strike as his reasons for leaving the industry.

According to the Carl Sandburg Historic Site Association, Galesburg native Carl Sandburg very briefly worked at Purington.

During World War II, Purington was commissioned by DuPont to make twenty-two million bricks for a factory in Indiana. Purington worked at full capacity for 146 days to fulfill the order.

Due to the increased popularity of asphalt and concrete roads, demand for paving bricks dropped dramatically. Production of Purington Pavers and other paving stones ceased in 1949.

=== 1950-1974 ===
After the production of pavers ceased, the Purington Brick Co. continued to make bricks for various construction purposes. In 1952, the yards were updated with "continuous" brick kilns. In 1974, the company closed permanently.

=== 1974-Today ===
In 1974, Alton Brick Company (which was owned at the time by Marge Schott) bought the brickyards. They have since fallen into a state of disrepair. In 2008, two buisinessmen bought the property. They intend to use it primarily as a hunting ground, but also plan to sell any salvageable bricks they find.

== Manufacturing process ==
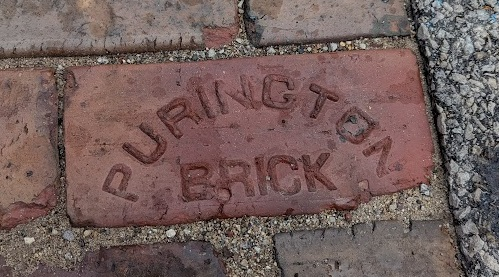
Purington brand brick

Purington Bricks were made from high-quality local blue shale and yellow clay. Before being fired, the bricks had a green color. Once fired, they had a large palette of colors, from maroon to dark purple. While the local geological features led to multiple brick companies present in the area, most of them produced soft bricks. Purington was the only local company making hard bricks, which were ideal for paving roads, etc. To create the bricks, the shale was mixed, crushed, and dampened. This mixture was then molded into a brick shape. (The raw bricks had to be slightly larger than the intended finished size, as the process of vitrification caused them to shrink to seven-eighths of their original size when fired.) The bricks were then stacked and put into a kiln to be fired. While in the kiln, sand was tossed onto the bricks to keep them from sticking together. After firing, the bricks were completed, although the kiln had to be cleaned between each use.
