= George Scalise =

Former president of BSEIU and convicted racketeer

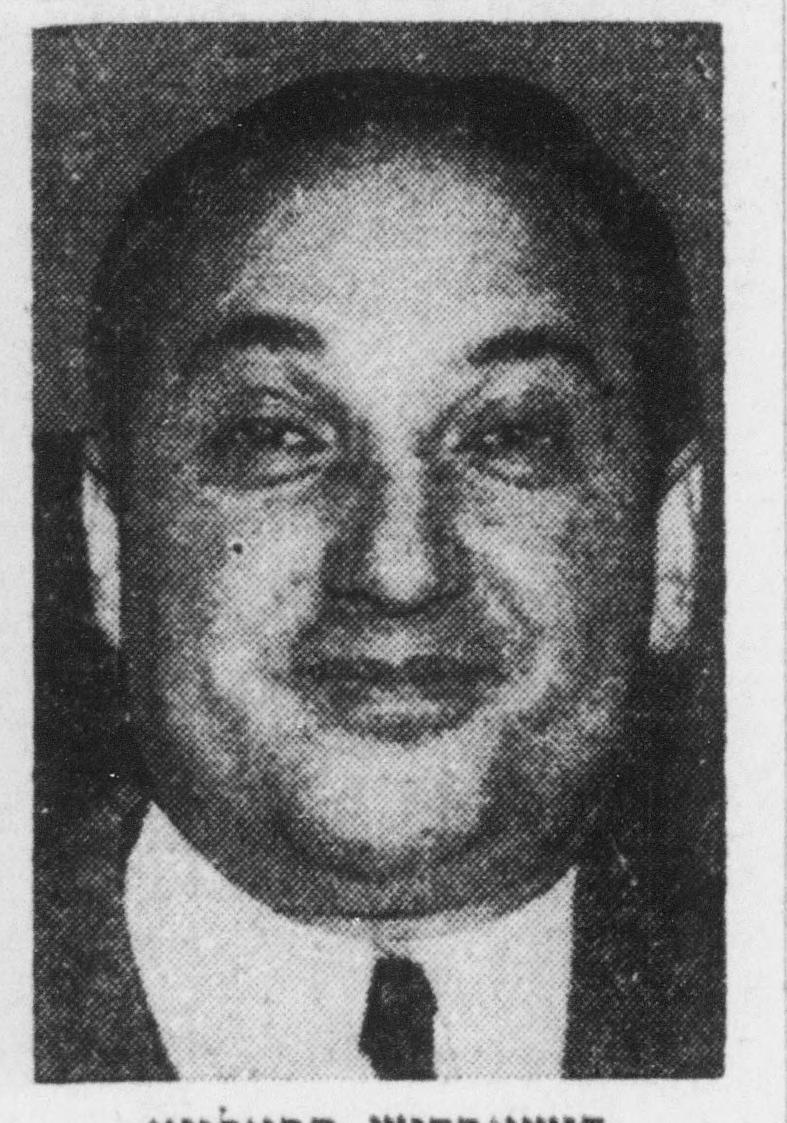

George Scalise was the former president of the Building Service Employees International Union (BSEIU) who was convicted of racketeering due to the exposure of labor racketeering by newspaper columnist Westbrook Pegler, who won a Pulitzer Prize in 1941 for his reporting.

The BSEIU (known as the Service Employees International Union since 1968) was founded in 1921 in Chicago to represent janitors, elevator operators, and window washers. Membership increased significantly with a 1934 strike in New York City's Garment District.

Scalise, who rose to head the union due to his connections with organized crime, was indicted by New York District Attorney Thomas E. Dewey, charged with extorting $100,000 from employers over three years. Convicted of labor racketeering, Scalise was sentenced to 10–20 years in prison.

== Organized crime infiltration of BSEIU ==
Scalise succeeded Jerry Horan, the corrupt head of the union, as president in 1937. Under Horan's presidency, the union's ties to the Chicago Outfit deepened. In 1933, Horan was accused by former Illinois Attorney General Edward J. Brundage of consorting with gangster Al Capone and seeking to improperly influence James H. Wilkerson, the judge overseeing Capone's 1931 tax evasion trial.

Horan, however, initially attempted to avoid being put under the influence of Capone and his Chicago Outfit. Capone sought control BSEIU in order to embezzle funds from the national union's treasury. But Big Tim Murphy had been gunned down in 1928, leaving Horan without protection. Horan could not turn to Chicago Mayor Bill Thompson, either, for Thompson was closely linked to the Capone mob. In March 1931, an intimidated Horan made peace with Capone. By 1933, Horan was taking his orders from Murray "The Camel" Humphreys, Capone's liaison to unions.

In 1934, the Capone mob forced Horan to hire George Scalise as a union organizer. Scalise, a 38-year-old from New York City, had been involved in interstate prostitution, labor racketeering and other organized crime activities since the early 1920s. A protégé of Anthony "Little Augie Pisano" Carfano, a former Capone associate who had moved to New York City and joined what was then known as the Luciano crime family, Scalise had used his mob connections to establish several small union locals with the Teamsters. With Carfano's help, he then built several large locals of building janitors and elevator operators, began skimming members' dues and receiving kickbacks from employers, and then affiliated the locals with the BSEIU. In 1934, Scalise asked Carfano to use his Chicago Outfit connections to help Scalise become the Eastern Representative for BSEIU, a position which put him in control of all BSEIU locals on the East Coast. Horan agreed to the deal, and Scalise was not only appointed to the position but Scalise also received 50 percent of the dues from any newly organized members in the East. In 1935, when the Fifth Vice President position on the BSEIU Board of Directors opened up due to a retirement, Scalise worked with Carfano and Horan to win appointment to the position.

Because of Horan's mob connections, BSEIU grew tremendously during Horan's presidency. The mob received more money the more union members there were, so there was every incentive to bring in new members. Mob enforcers intimidated employers into permitting unionization of their employees, and existing locals swelled with members while new locals proliferated. BSEIU grew from 10,000 members in 1932 to 40,000 members in 1936 and 75,000 members in 1939.
