= Polish National Department =

The Polish National Department (PND, Polish: Wydział Narodowy Polski, WNP) was a major organization of Polish-American Polish diaspora in United States around and after World War I. Originally the Polish Central Relief Committee and based in Chicago, it organized relief for war-torn and newly independent Second Polish Republic. Prominent activists included world-famous pianist and future prime minister of Poland, Ignacy Jan Paderewski and former Illinois Treasurer John F. Smulski.

PND was aligned to Polish endecja faction of Roman Dmowski, and opposed to Committee of National Defense (CND, Komitet Obrony Narodowej, KON), aligned to Józef Piłsudski's faction.
