= Purington Shale =

Geologic formation in Illinois

- Stratigraphic range: Carboniferous
- Type: Formation

Location
- Region: Illinois
- Country: United States

The Purington Shale is a geologic formation in Illinois. It preserves fossils dating back to the Carboniferous period.

== See also ==
- List of fossiliferous stratigraphic units in Illinois
- Purington
