= David Gore =

American politician

David Gore (April 7, 1827 – October 10, 1911) was an American politician and farmer.

Born in Trigg County, Kentucky, Gore moved to Madison County, Illinois with his parents in 1834. He served in the United States Army during the Mexican–American War and served as quartermaster. After the war, Gore moved to Macoupin County, Illinois and settled in Carlinville, Illinois. Gore was a farmer. In 1874, Gore ran for the office of Illinois Treasurer on the Greenback Party ticket and lost the election. Gore served in the Illinois State Senate from 1883 to 1887. He also served on the Illinois Board of Agriculture from 1878 to 1896 and was president of the board. Gore was a Democrat. From 1893 to 1897, Gore served as the Auditor of Public Accounts, State of Illinois. In 1910, Gore moved to Benton Harbor, Michigan to live with his son. Gore died at his son's house in Benton Harbor, Michigan.

== Notes ==
Party political offices
Preceded by Andrew Welch	Democratic nominee for Illinois Auditor of Public Accounts; 1892	Succeeded by Andrew L. Maxwell
Political offices
Preceded by Charles W. Pavey	Illinois Auditor of Public Accounts; 1893–1897	Succeeded by James S. McCullough
