= Isaac Miller Hamilton =

American politician

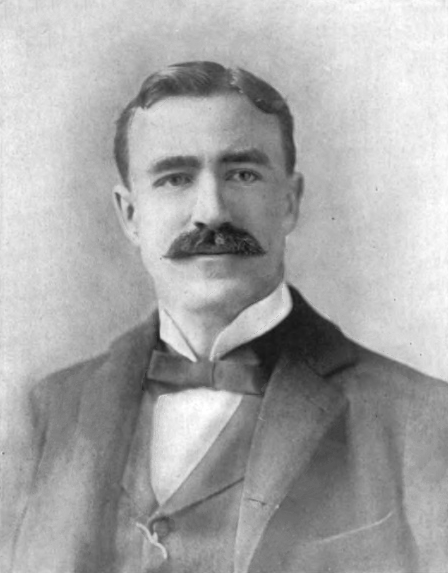

Member of the Illinois Senate from the 16th district
- In office 1896 – 1900
- Preceded by: George R. Letourneau
- Succeeded by: Len Small

Personal details
- Born: September 6, 1864 Ash Grove, Illinois
- Died: August 11, 1952 (aged 87) Chicago, Illinois
- Party: Republican
- Profession: Banker
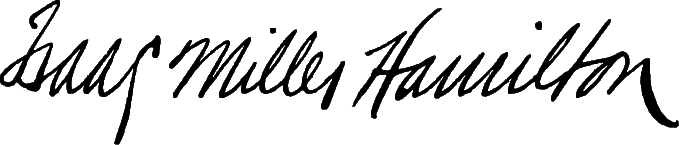
- Signature

Isaac Miller Hamilton (September 6, 1864 – August 11, 1952) was an American politician and businessman from Illinois. Hamilton attended private school before establishing a successful banking and real estate company. He was admitted to the bar in 1889 and practiced law. Hamilton was elected to the Illinois Senate in 1896, serving a four-year term. He later founded the Federal Life Insurance Company and served as its longtime president. He remained chairman of its board of directors until the time of his death.

== Biography ==
Isaac Miller Hamilton was born on September 6, 1864, in Ash Grove, Illinois. The son of a successful businessman, Hamilton attended private school at Grand Prairie Seminary. In 1881, at the age of sixteen, he established a store with Tunis Young in Ash Grove. Young & Hamilton became a successful banking and real estate house, later moving to Cissna Park. Hamilton was admitted to the bar in 1889 and established a practice focused on chancery, probate, and corporate law. Hamilton became town attorney for Cissna Park when it was incorporated.

Hamilton did not seek any other public office until 1896, when he successfully ran for a seat on the Illinois Senate. During his term, he moved to Chicago to establish the law form of Hamilton & Atkinson. He co-founded the Federal Life Insurance Company with J. Ellsworth Griffin and was appointed its first president. Hamilton served as president until 1939, when he was named chairman of the board. He later became chairman of the Lake Shore National Bank.

Hamilton was a member of the Union League Club of Chicago. He was active in Freemasonry, attaining the rank of 32nd degree Mason. He was also a member of the Knights of Pythias, Modern Woodmen of America, and Tribe of Ben-Hur. He was president of the Illinois State League of Republican Clubs and the National Republican League. He died at his home in Chicago on August 11, 1952, and was buried in Rosehill Cemetery.
