= Richard R. Meents =

American politician

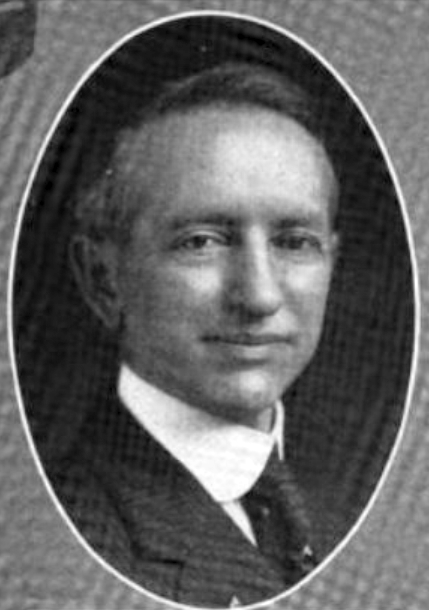

Member of the Illinois Senate
- In office 1922–1934

Member of the Illinois House of Representatives
- In office 1914–1922

Personal details
- Born: Richard Reimer Meents; August 27, 1875 Ashkum, Illinois
- Died: July 18, 1945 (aged 69) Ashkum, Illinois
- Party: Republican
- Occupation: Businessman, politician

Richard Reimer Meents (August 27, 1875 – July 18, 1945) was an American politician and businessman in Illinois.

== Biography ==
Meents was born in Ashkum, Illinois. He went to the public schools and to a seminary in Onarga, Illinois. Meents was involved in the banking business. Meents served on the school board and was the secretary of the school board.

He was involved with the Republican Party. Meents served in the Illinois House of Representatives from 1915 to 1921 and in the Illinois Senate from 1921 to 1933. Meents died from a heart attack at his home in Ashkum, Illinois.
