= James S. McCullough =

American politician

James Skiles McCullough (May 4, 1843 – June 22, 1914) was an American politician.

Born in Mercersburg, Pennsylvania, McCullough moved with his family to Urbana, Illinois. McCullough went to the Fulton public schools. He served in the 76th Illinois Volunteer Infantry Regiment during the American Civil War. After the civil war McCullough went to the soldiers school in Fulton, Illinois. He then moved back to Urbana, Illinois and served as deputy clerk for Champaign County, Illinois. McCullough was elected county clerk for Champaign County and was a Republican. From 1897 to 1913, McCullough served as the Auditor of Public Accounts, the State of Illinois. McCullough died at his home in Champaign, Illinois after suffering a stroke.

== Notes ==
Party political offices
Preceded by Charles W. Pavey	Republican nominee for Illinois Auditor of Public Accounts; 1896, 1900, 1904, 1908, 1912	Succeeded by Andrew Russel
