= Len Small =

American politician, Governor of Illinois (1862–1936)

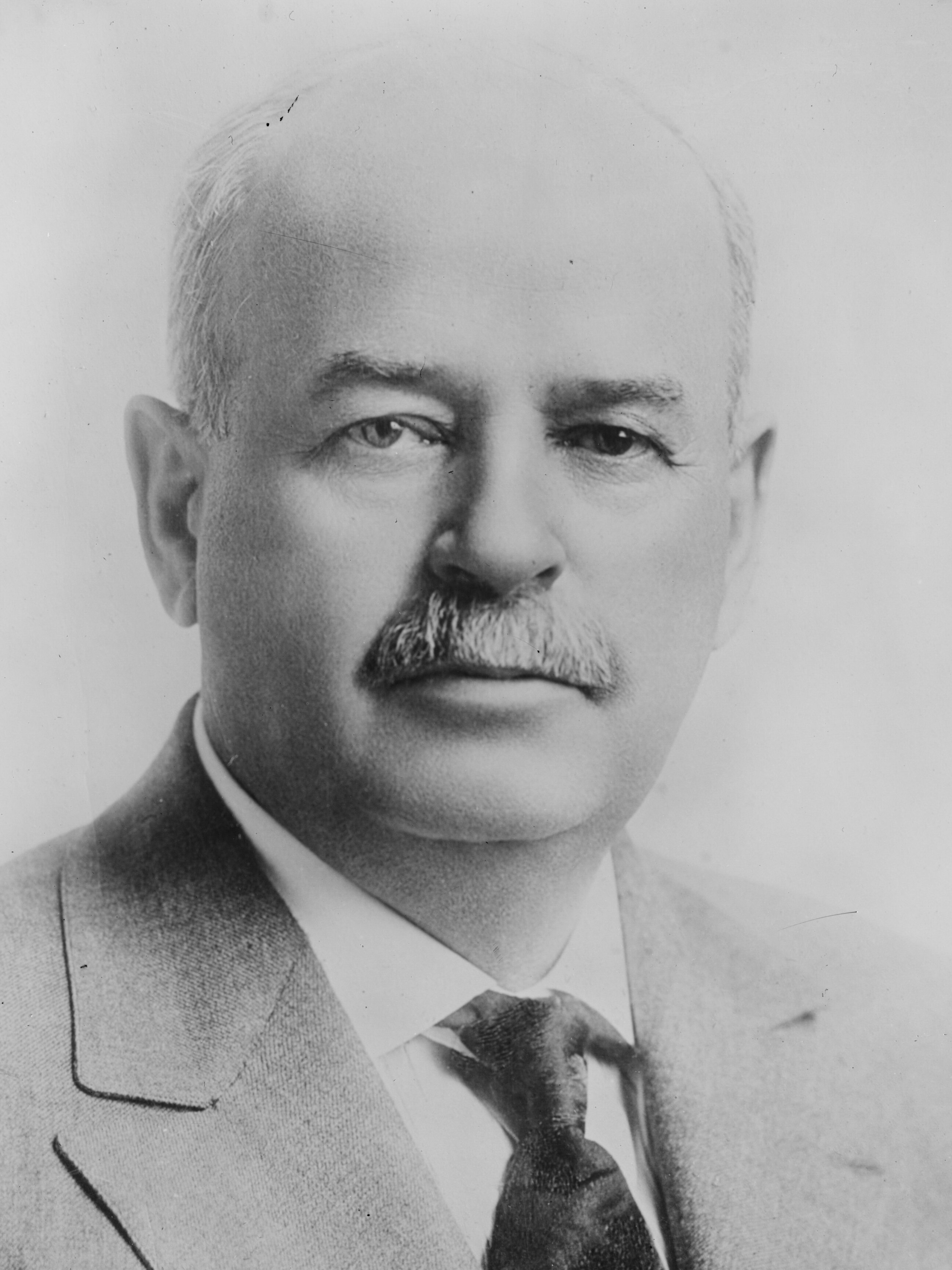

26th Governor of Illinois
- In office January 10, 1921 – January 14, 1929
- Lieutenant: Fred E. Sterling
- Preceded by: Frank Orren Lowden
- Succeeded by: Louis Lincoln Emmerson

33rd and 39th Treasurer of Illinois
- In office 1917–1919
- Governor: Frank Orren Lowden
- Preceded by: Fred E. Sterling
- Succeeded by: Andrew Russel
- In office 1905–1907
- Governor: Charles S. Deneen
- Preceded by: Fred A. Busse
- Succeeded by: John F. Smulski

Member of the Illinois Senate from the 20th district
- In office 1902 – 1904
- Preceded by: re-districted
- Succeeded by: Edward C. Curtis

Member of the Illinois Senate from the 16th district
- In office 1900 – 1902
- Preceded by: Isaac Miller Hamilton
- Succeeded by: re-districted

Personal details
- Born: June 16, 1862 Kankakee County, Illinois, U.S.
- Died: May 17, 1936 (aged 73) Kankakee, Illinois, U.S.
- Party: Republican
- Spouse: Ida Moore
- Education: Valparaiso University
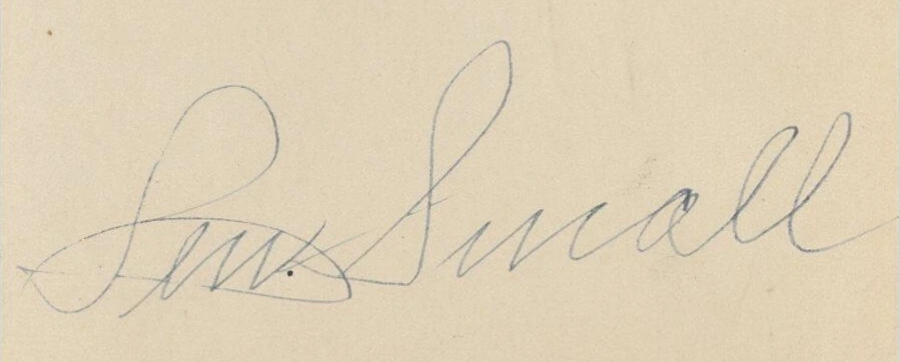
- Signature

Lennington "Len" Small (June 16, 1862 – May 17, 1936) was an American politician who served as the 26th governor of Illinois from 1921 to 1929. He previously was a member of the Illinois state senate from the 16th District from 1901 to 1903 and was Illinois state treasurer, from 1905 to 1907, and from 1917 to 1919. He is known for accusations of embezzlement brought against him.

== Early life ==
Small was born in Kankakee County, Illinois, he was the son of Abram, a doctor, and Calista (Currier). and attended public Schools and Northern Indiana Normal School, now Valparaiso University, through his senior year. After schooling, he became a teacher and invested in real estate, eventually owning a farm, a bank, and Kankakee's daily newspaper, the Daily Journal. On November 21, 1883, Small married Ida Moore, and they had three children together, Budd, Leslie, and May. On June 26, 1922, Ida Moore Small died suddenly from a stroke at the age of 60, while Small and his wife were being welcomed home following his acquittal on charges of embezzlement.

== Political career ==
Small's political career began in 1896 when he was elected Clerk of the Kankakee County Circuit Court. In 1900, Small was elected to the Illinois Senate from the 20th district. He served in the Illinois Senate from 1901 to 1905. The 20th district included Grundy, Iroquois, and Kankakee counties. Small was the Illinois Treasurer from 1905 to 1908, and again from 1917 to 1919. He served as the assistant U.S. Treasurer in charge of the subtreasury at Chicago from 1908 to 1912 and was a delegate to Republican National Convention from Illinois in 1908, 1912, and 1932.

Small was elected governor of Illinois in 1920 and was re-elected in 1924. Six months after becoming governor, he was indicted on charges of embezzling more than a million dollars in a money-laundering scheme in which he placed state funds into a fake bank while he was state treasurer. He was acquitted, but eight jurors later got state jobs, raising suspicions of jury tampering. Despite this, he paid $650,000 to settle the case.

As governor, Small pardoned 20 members of the Communist Labor Party of America, convicted under the Illinois Sedition Act. He also pardoned or paroled more than 1,000 convicted felons, including Harry Guzik, brother of the Chicago Outfit's Jake Guzik, of Posen, Illinois, who was convicted of kidnapping young girls and forcing them into lives of prostitution (then commonly called white slavery).

Small was also noted for his active highway program, he spent $200 million for an estimated 7,000 miles of concrete-paved roads, which led Illinois to have the most developed road system in the United States. But the roads got a Bond (finance) of half the funding the Small administration spent on the roads, which had to be retired by auto license fees.

In 1923, bootlegger Edward "Spike" O'Donnell of the South Side Chicago was pardoned by Small. O'Donnell returned to Chicago as the leader of one of the most powerful bootlegging gangs in the city.

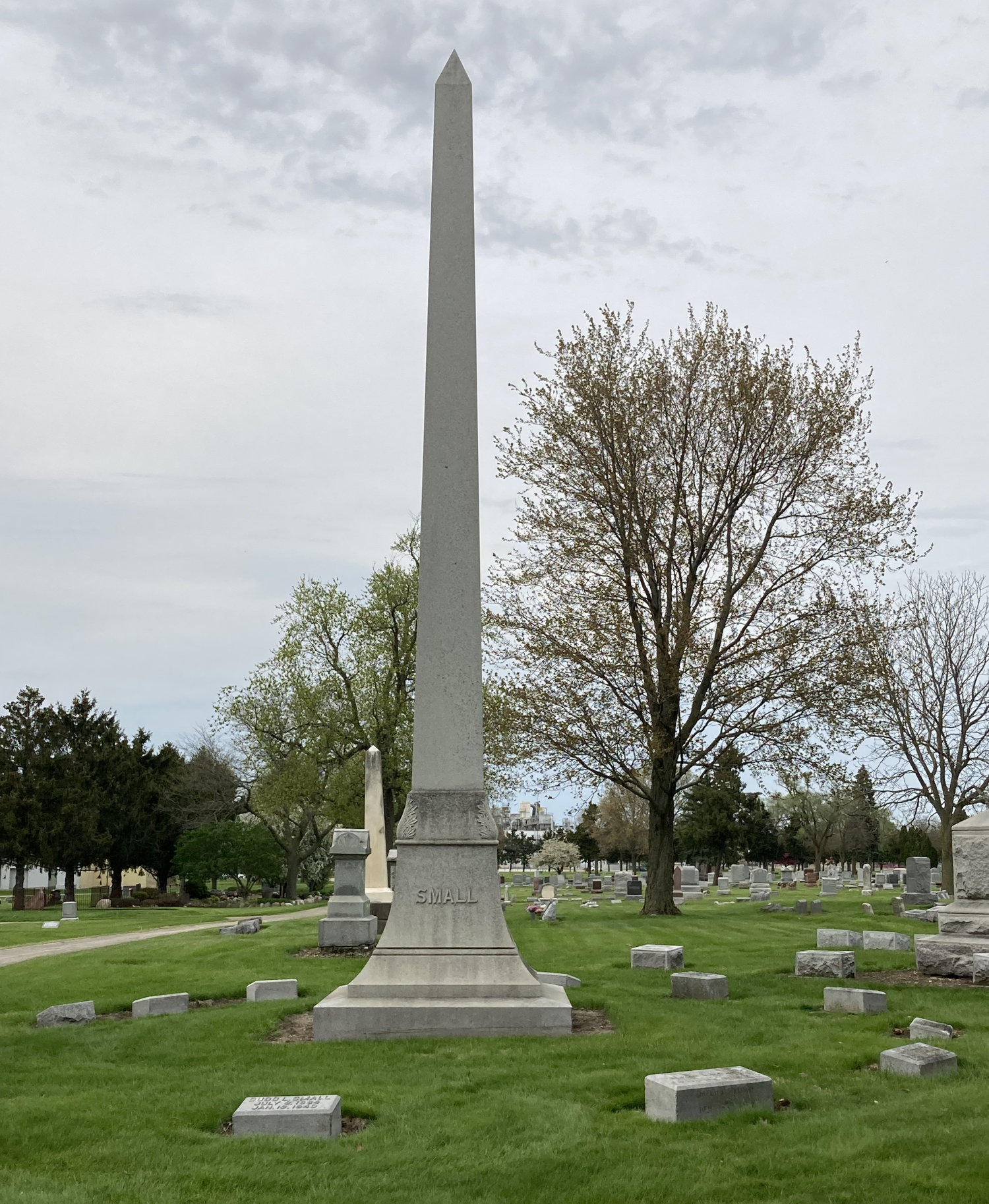
Small's grave at Mound Grove Cemetery

Small's reputation for corruption finally caught up with him at the ballot box when he was defeated in the 1928 Republican "Pineapple Primary" by a margin of 63% to 37% against Louis Lincoln Emmerson, the incumbent Illinois Secretary of State.

== Later career ==
Small made an unsuccessful run for governor in 1932, and another in 1936. During and after these runs, he lived on his farm and owned the Kankakee Daily Republican

Small died on May 17, 1936. He is buried at Mound Grove Cemetery in Kankakee, Illinois.

Party political offices
| Preceded by Fred A. Busse | Republican nominee for Illinois Treasurer; 1904 | Succeeded by John F. Smulski |
| Preceded by Andrew Russel | Republican nominee for Illinois Treasurer; 1916 | Succeeded by Fred E. Sterling |
| Preceded by Frank Orren Lowden | Republican nominee for Governor of Illinois; 1920, 1924 | Succeeded by Louis Lincoln Emmerson |
| Preceded by Louis Lincoln Emmerson | Republican nominee for Governor of Illinois; 1932 | Succeeded by Charles W. Brooks |
Political offices
| Preceded by Fred A. Busse | Treasurer of Illinois; 1905–1907 | Succeeded by John F. Smulski |
| Preceded by Andrew Russel | Treasurer of Illinois; 1917–1919 | Succeeded by Fred E. Sterling |
| Preceded by Frank Orren Lowden | Governor of Illinois; 1921–1929 | Succeeded by Louis Lincoln Emmerson |
