= 1924 Illinois gubernatorial election =

- November 4, 1924
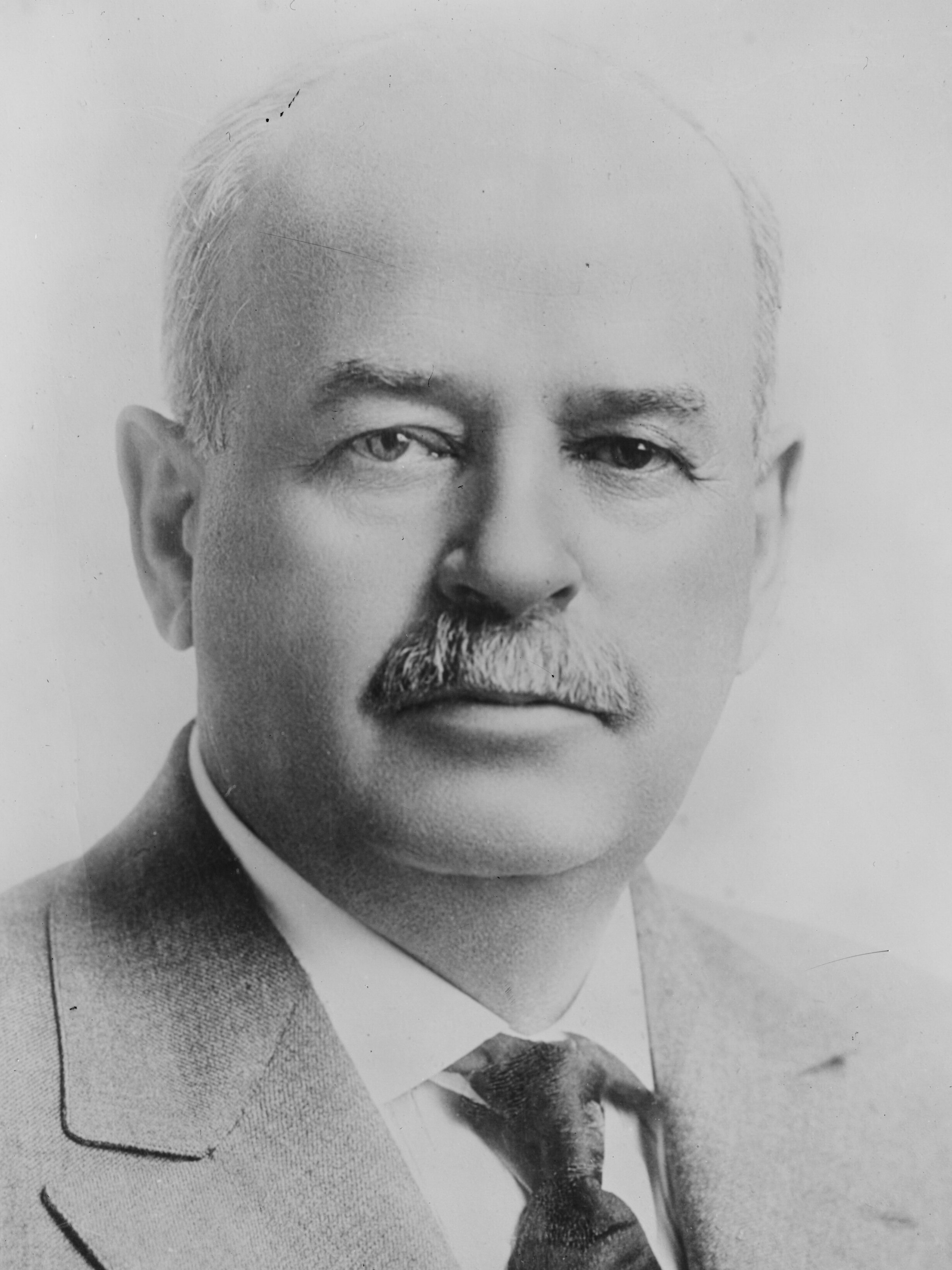

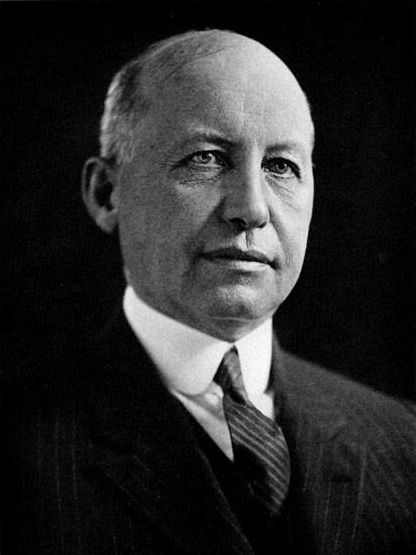
Nominee	Len Small	Norman L. Jones
Party	Republican	Democratic
Popular vote	1,366,446	1,021,408
Percentage	56.72%	42.40%
- County results Small: 50–60% 60–70% 70–80% Jones: 50–60% 60–70% 70–80%
Governor before election
Len Small
Republican
Elected Governor
Len Small
Republican

The 1924 Illinois gubernatorial election was held on November 4, 1924. Incumbent first-term Republican Governor Len Small defeated Democratic nominee Norman L. Jones with 56.72% of the vote.

== Primary elections ==
Primary elections were held on April 8, 1924.

=== Democratic primary ===
==== Candidates ====
- Charles M. Borchers, former United States House of Representatives and former mayor of Decatur, Illinois
- Lee O'Neil Browne, State Representative
- Norman L. Jones, former State Representative and incumbent circuit judge
- Kent E. Keller, former state senator
- Charles B. Thomas, Democratic nominee for Treasurer of Illinois in 1904

==== Results ====
Democratic primary results
Party	Candidate	Votes	%
Democratic	Norman L. Jones	159,912	52.53
Democratic	Lee O'Neil Browne	77,723	25.53
Democratic	Charles B. Thomas	30,687	10.08
Democratic	Kent E. Keller	23,199	7.62
Democratic	Charles M. Borchers	12,880	4.23
Democratic	Write-ins	6	0.00
Total votes		304,407	100.00

=== Republican primary ===
==== Candidates ====
- Len Small, incumbent governor
- Thurlow Essington, State Senator

==== Results ====
Republican primary results
Party	Candidate	Votes	%
Republican	Len Small (incumbent)	527,872	53.01
Republican	Thurlow Essington	467,952	46.99
Republican	Write-ins	5	0.00
Total votes		995,829	100.00

=== Socialist primary ===
==== Candidates ====
- Andrew Lafin, Socialist nominee for governor in 1920

==== Results ====
Socialist primary results
Party	Candidate	Votes	%
Socialist	Andrew Lafin	925	100.00
Total votes		925	100.00

== General election ==
=== Candidates ===
==== Major candidates ====
- Len Small, Republican
- Norman L. Jones, Democratic

==== Minor candidates ====
- Andrew Lafin, Socialist
- William F. Dunne, Workers, newspaper editor
- Fred Koch, Socialist Labor
- James A. Logan, Independent Republican
- Morris Lynchenheim, Commonwealth Land

=== Results ===
1924 Illinois gubernatorial election
Party	Candidate	Votes	%	±%
Republican	Len Small (incumbent)	1,366,446	56.72%	
Democratic	Norman L. Jones	1,021,408	42.40%	
Socialist	Andrew Lafin	15,191	0.63%	
Workers	William F. Dunne	2,329	0.10%	
Socialist Labor	Fred Koch	2,312	0.10%	
Independent Republican	James A. Logan	1,025	0.04%	
Commonwealth Land	Morris Lynchenheim	414	0.02%	
	Scattering	6	0.00%	
Majority		345,038	14.32%	
Turnout		2,409,131	100.00%	
Republican hold		Swing		

== See also ==
- 1924 Illinois lieutenant gubernatorial election

== Bibliography ==
- Glashan, Roy R. (1979). American Governors and Gubernatorial Elections, 1775-1978. Meckler Books. ISBN 0-930466-17-9.
- Compiled by Louis L. Emmerson, Secretary of State (1924). Official vote of the State of Illinois cast at the General Election, Nov. 4, 1924, &c., &c. Springfield, Illinois: Illinois State Journal Co., State Printers.
