= 1920 Illinois lieutenant gubernatorial election =

- November 2, 1920
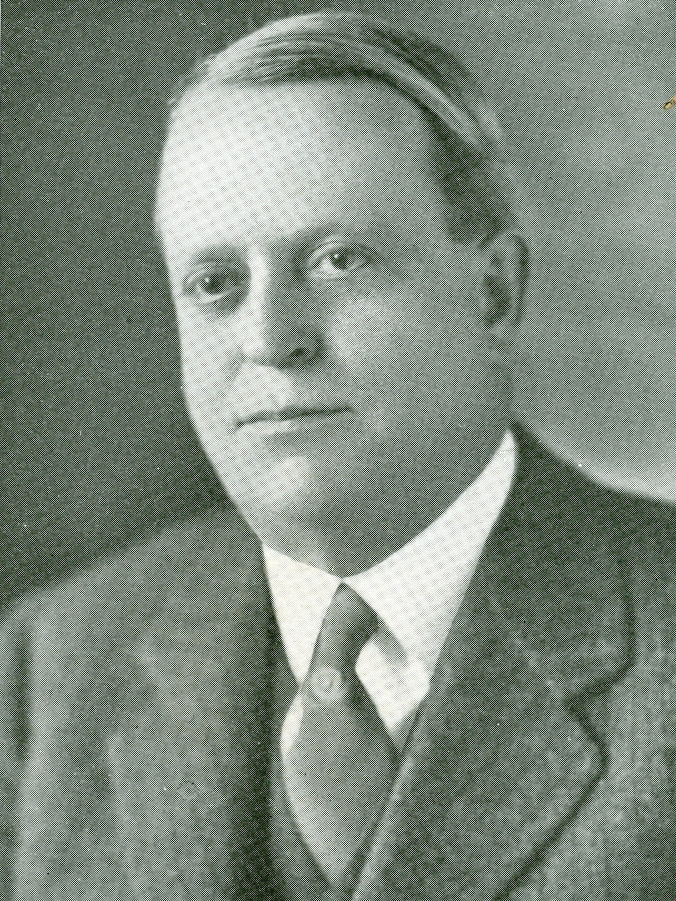

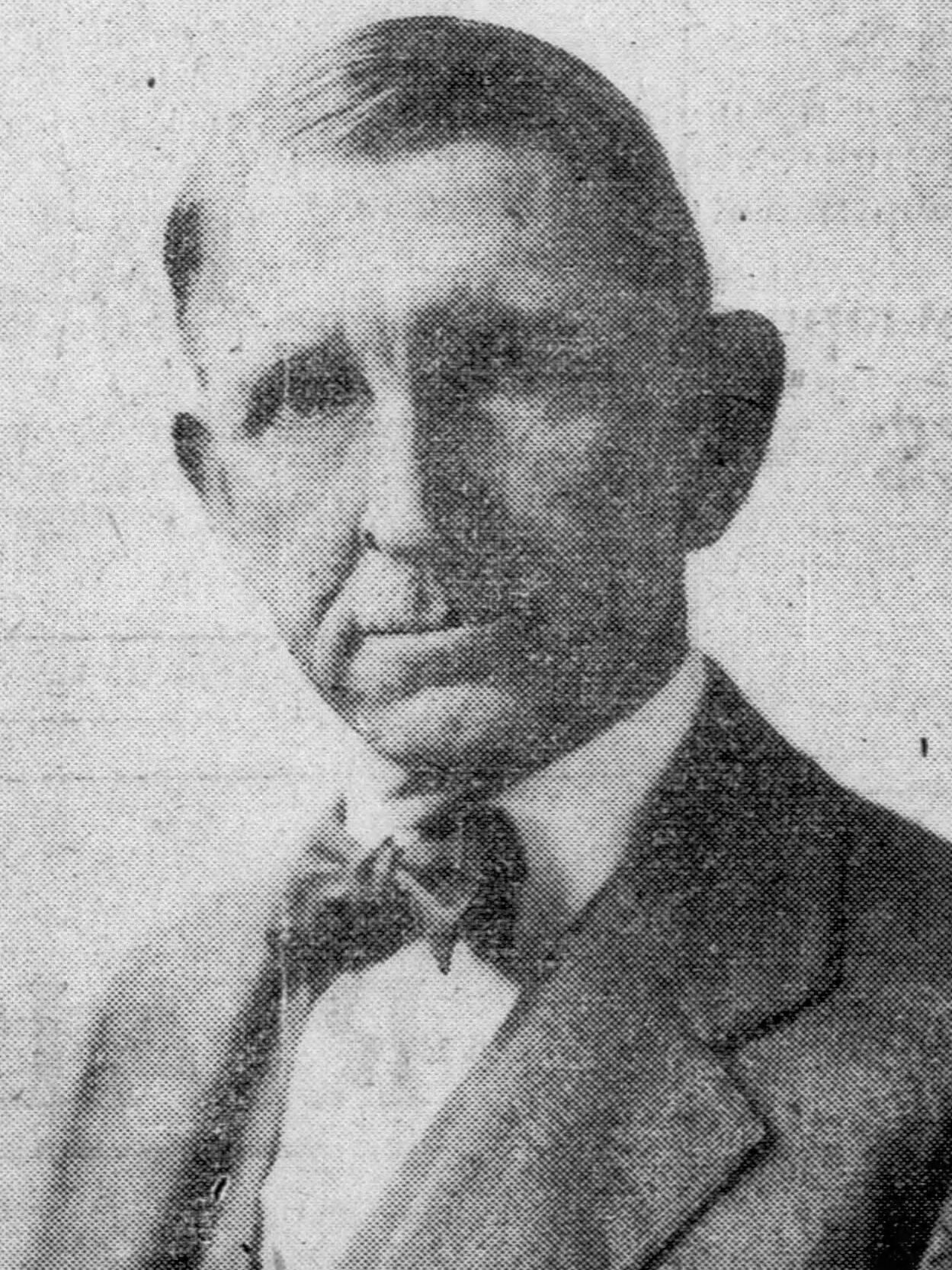
Nominee	Fred E. Sterling	Walter W. Williams
Party	Republican	Democratic
Popular vote	1,329,119	613,646
Percentage	64.17%	29.63%
Lieutenant Governor before election
John G. Oglesby
Republican
Elected Lieutenant Governor
Fred E. Sterling
Republican

The 1920 Illinois lieutenant gubernatorial election was held on November 2, 1920. It saw Republican nominee Fred E. Sterling win a landslide victory.

== Primary elections ==
Primary elections were held on September 15, 1920.

=== Democratic primary ===
==== Candidates ====
- Leo G. Hana, soldier and former director of athletics at the University of Illinois
- Walter W. Williams, former State Representative

==== Results ====
Democratic primary results
Party	Candidate	Votes	%
Democratic	Walter W. Williams	112,464	71.49
Democratic	Leo G. Hana	44,843	28.51
Total votes		157,307	100.00

=== Republican primary ===
==== Candidates ====
- William H. H. Miller, state legislator
- Fred E. Sterling, incumbent State Treasurer

==== Results ====
Republican primary results
Party	Candidate	Votes	%
Republican	Fred E. Sterling	390,872	52.64
Republican	William H. H. Miller	351,710	47.36
Total votes		742,582	100.00

=== Socialist primary ===
==== Candidates ====
- George Koop

==== Results ====
Socialist primary results
Party	Candidate	Votes	%
Socialist	George Koop	1,841	100.00
Total votes		1,841	100.00

== General election ==
=== Candidates ===
==== Major candidates ====
- Walter W. Williams, Democratic
- Fred E. Sterling, Republican

==== Minor candidates ====
- Charles Dold, Farmer-Labor, executive board member of the Chicago Federation of Labor
- Clay Freeman Gaumer, Prohibition, Prohibition nominee for U.S. House in 1916 from Illinois's at-large congressional district
- Arthur D. Foyer, Single Tax
- George Koop, Socialist, Socialist nominee for U.S. House in 1906 and 1908 from Illinois's 7th congressional district
- Cornelius W. Stapleton, Socialist Labor

=== Results ===
1920 Illinois lieutenant gubernatorial election
Party	Candidate	Votes	%	±%
Republican	Fred E. Sterling	1,329,119	64.17%	
Democratic	Walter W. Williams	613,646	29.63%	
Socialist	George Koop	64,342	3.11%	
Farmer–Labor	Charles Dold	50,044	2.42%	
Prohibition	Clay Freeman Gaumer	10,294	0.50%	
Socialist Labor	Cornelius W. Stapleton	3,024	0.15%	
Single Tax	Arthur D. Foyer	841	0.04%	
Majority		715,473	34.54%	
Turnout		2,071,310	100.00%	
Republican hold		Swing		

== See also ==
- 1920 Illinois gubernatorial election

== Bibliography ==
- Compiled by Louis L. Emmerson, Secretary of State (1920). Official vote of the State of Illinois cast at the General Election, Nov. 2, 1920, &c., &c. Springfield, Illinois: Illinois State Journal Co., State Printers.
