= Floyd Thompson (lawyer) =

Illinois Supreme Court judge and defense lawyer (1887–1960)

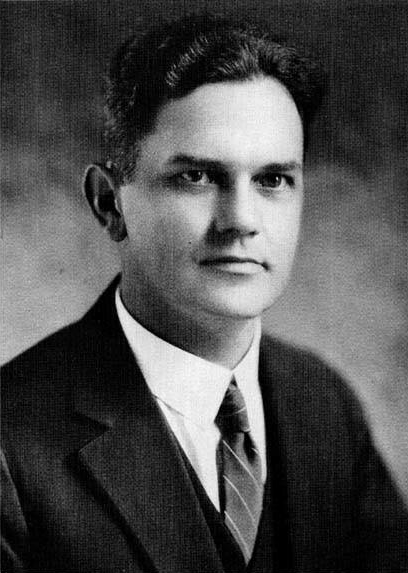
- Photograph of Thompson during his time as a justice of the Supreme Court of Illinois.

Justice of the Supreme Court of Illinois
- In office April 1, 1919 – 1928
- Preceded by: George A. Cooke
- Succeeded by: William M. Farmer

Personal details
- Born: December 25, 1887 Roodhouse, Illinois
- Died: October 18, 1960 (aged 72)
- Party: Democrat
- Parent(s): Alonzo and Sarah (née Edwards) Thompson
- Occupation: Criminal lawyer publisher, East Moline Herald
- Cabinet: President, Illinois State Bar Association (1933–34); Vice-president, American Institute of Criminal Law and Criminology
- Committees: Chairman, American Bar Association's Section of Criminal Law (1921–1923); Charter member, American Law Institute

Floyd E. Thompson (December 25, 1887 – October 18, 1960) was a justice of the Supreme Court of Illinois and a criminal lawyer who defended American businessman Samuel Insull in 1934 against mail fraud and antitrust charges. Insull was acquitted.

== Biography ==
Thompson, the son of Alonzo and Sarah (Edwards) Thompson, was born Christmas Day in 1887 on a farm in Roodhouse, Illinois. Thompson worked on the family farm while he was in school; after graduation, he spent three years working as a teacher.

Thompson never attended university or law school, but he studied for the bar examination on his own, and in 1911, he was admitted to the bar of Tennessee and Illinois. He established a law practice in East Moline, Illinois, and also became publisher of the East Moline Herald. In November 1912, he won election as State's attorney for Rock Island County, Illinois. He was elected president of the Illinois State's Attorney's Association in December 1915, and easily won re-election as State's Attorney in November 1916.

In 1919, a vacancy arose on the Supreme Court of Illinois when Justice George A. Cooke stepped down to become chief counsel of Peoples Gas Light and Coke Company, and Thompson ran for this seat, winning election in April 1919. In June 1921, he won re-election to a full term. Thompson served on the Illinois Supreme Court until 1928, during which time he served as chairman of the American Bar Association's Section of Criminal Law (1921–1923) and as vice-president of the American Institute of Criminal Law and Criminology. He was a charter member of the American Law Institute upon its founding in 1923.

In 1928, Thompson resigned from the Illinois Supreme Court to run for governor of Illinois on the Democratic ticket. He lost to Louis Lincoln Emmerson as part of the landslide 1928 victory of Herbert Hoover and the Republicans.

Upon his defeat, Thompson became a partner at Newman, Poppenhusen, Stern & Johnston, with the firm changing its name to Johnston, Thompson, & Raymond (today, the firm is known as Jenner & Block). During his time at the firm, Thompson served as lead counsel in what was arguably the most sensational prosecution of the Great Depression era, that of Samuel Insull, the president of Commonwealth Edison, whose share price had collapsed in 1929, wiping out the life savings of thousands of small investors. Insull was charged with mail fraud, antitrust violations, and violation of the Bankruptcy Act of 1898. There were ultimately three trials, and Insull was acquitted each time.

He was president of the Illinois State Bar Association 1933–34.

In 1949, during the prosecution of Preston Tucker (developer of the 1948 Tucker Sedan) and six Tucker Corporation executives for violating the securities laws, Thompson defended Floyd Cerf, the stockbroker who handled the allegedly illegal stock offering for Tucker Corporation. Tucker, Cerf, and all the other defendants were ultimately acquitted on all charges.

Party political offices
Preceded by Norman L. Jones	Democratic nominee for Governor of Illinois; 1928	Succeeded by Henry Horner
