= 1924 Illinois lieutenant gubernatorial election =

- November 4, 1924
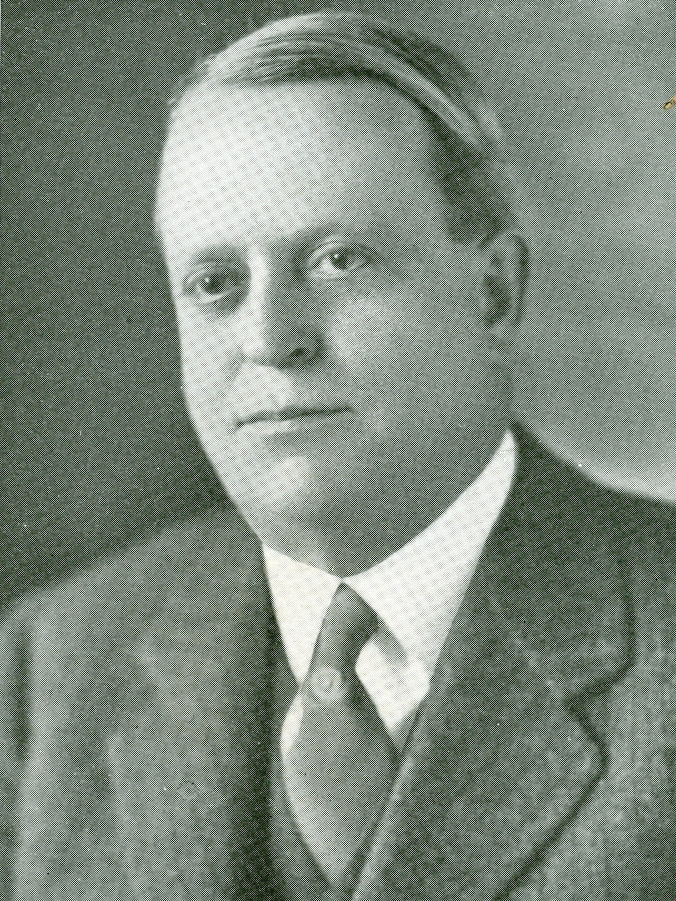

Nominee	Fred E. Sterling	Ferdinand A. Garesche
Party	Republican	Democratic
Popular vote	1,502,517	727,390
Percentage	66.71%	32.30%
Lieutenant Governor before election
Fred E. Sterling
Republican
Elected Lieutenant Governor
Fred E. Sterling
Republican

The 1924 Illinois lieutenant gubernatorial election was held on November 4, 1924. Incumbent Republican Lieutenant Governor Fred E. Sterling won a landslide reelection.

== Primary elections ==
Primary elections were held on April 8, 1924.

=== Democratic primary ===
==== Candidates ====
- Michael H. Cleary, former State Senator and Democratic nominee for Illinois's at-large congressional district in 1918
- Mark M. Duffy
- Ferdinand A. Garesche, State Representative

==== Results ====
Democratic primary results
Party	Candidate	Votes	%
Democratic	Ferdinand A. Garesche	122,996	47.16
Democratic	Michael H. Cleary	73,657	28.24
Democratic	Mark M. Duffy	64,144	24.60
Total votes		206,797	100.00

=== Republican primary ===
==== Candidates ====
- Charles F. Kramp
- Lewis Rinaker, former State Representative
- Fred E. Sterling, incumbent Lieutenant Governor

==== Results ====
Republican primary results
Party	Candidate	Votes	%
Republican	Fred E. Sterling (incumbent)	446,609	56.50
Republican	Lewis Rinaker	260,988	33.01
Republican	Charles F. Kramp	82,931	10.49
Total votes		790,528	100.00

=== Socialist primary ===
==== Candidates ====
- Tilden Bozarth, delegate to the 1924 Socialist Party National Convention

==== Results ====
Socialist primary results
Party	Candidate	Votes	%
Socialist	Tilden Bozarth	902	100.00
Total votes		902	100.00

== General election ==
=== Candidates ===
==== Major candidates ====
- Ferdinand A. Garesche, Democratic
- Fred E. Sterling, Republican

==== Minor candidates ====
- Tilden Bozarth, Socialist
- Gustave A. Jennings, Socialist Labor, nominee for Governor in 1908 and for Lieutenant Governor in 1916
- John Watt, Workers
- John B. McElroy, Independent Republican
- John B. Reilly, Commonwealth Land

=== Results ===
1924 Illinois lieutenant gubernatorial election
Party	Candidate	Votes	%	±%
Republican	Fred E. Sterling (incumbent)	1,502,517	66.71%	
Democratic	Ferdinand A. Garesche	727,390	32.30%	
Socialist	Tilden Bozarth	16,235	0.72%	
Socialist Labor	Gustave A. Jennings	2,426	0.11%	
Workers	John Watt	2,310	0.10%	
Independent Republican	John B. McElroy	826	0.04%	
Commonwealth Land	John B. Reilly	539	0.02%	
	Scattering	3	0.00%	
Majority		775,127	34.41%	
Turnout		2,252,246	100.00%	
Republican hold		Swing		

== See also ==
- 1924 Illinois gubernatorial election

== Bibliography ==
- Compiled by Louis L. Emmerson, Secretary of State (1924). Official vote of the State of Illinois cast at the General Election, Nov. 4, 1924, &c., &c. Springfield, Illinois: Illinois State Journal Co., State Printers.
