= 1928 Illinois lieutenant gubernatorial election =

- November 6, 1928
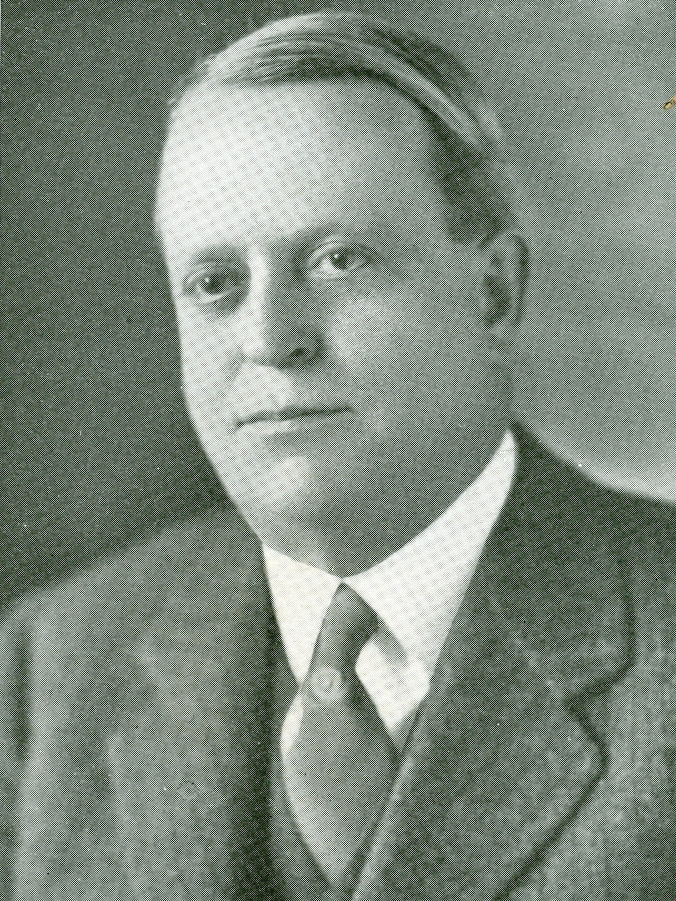

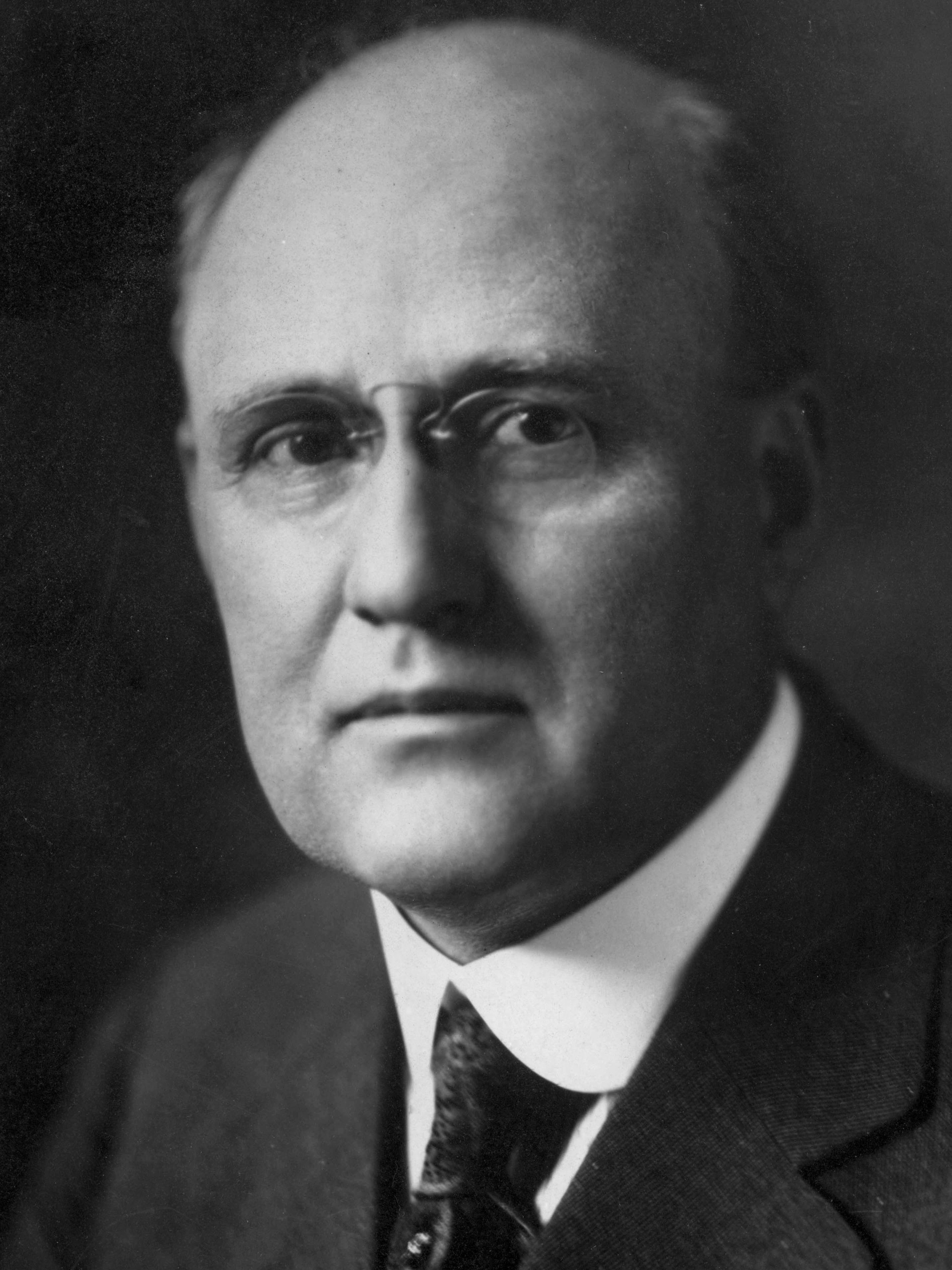
Nominee	Fred E. Sterling	Peter A. Waller
Party	Republican	Democratic
Popular vote	1,573,183	1,286,765
Percentage	54.68%	44.72%
Lieutenant Governor before election
Fred E. Sterling
Republican
Elected Lieutenant Governor
Fred E. Sterling
Republican

The 1928 Illinois lieutenant gubernatorial election was held on November 6, 1928. Incumbent Republican lieutenant governor Fred E. Sterling was reelected to a third consecutive term.

== Primary elections ==
Primary elections were held on April 10, 1928.

=== Democratic primary ===
==== Candidates ====
- Peter A. Waller, Democratic nominee for U.S. Senate in 1920

==== Results ====
Democratic primary results
Party	Candidate	Votes	%
Democratic	Peter A. Waller	206,254	100.00
	Scattering	5	0.00
Total votes		206,259	100.00

=== Republican primary ===
==== Candidates ====
- Theodore D. Smith
- Fred E. Sterling, incumbent Lieutenant Governor

==== Results ====
Republican primary results
Party	Candidate	Votes	%
Republican	Fred E. Sterling (incumbent)	933,856	68.58
Republican	Theodore D. Smith	427,809	31.42
	Scattering	2	0.00
Total votes		1,361,667	100.00

=== Independent Republican primary ===
==== Candidates ====
- Theodore D. Smith
- Fred E. Sterling, incumbent Lieutenant Governor

==== Results ====
Independent Republican primary results
Party	Candidate	Votes	%
Independent Republican	Fred E. Sterling (incumbent)	43	69.35
Independent Republican	Theodore D. Smith	16	25.81
	Scattering	3	4.84
Total votes		62	100.00

== General election ==
=== Major candidates ===
- Peter A. Waller, Democratic
- Fred E. Sterling, Republican

=== Minor candidates ===
- William R. Snow, Socialist
- F. W. Shimbaugh, Socialist Labor
- William Luigge, Workers Party of America

=== Results ===
1928 Illinois lieutenant gubernatorial election
Party	Candidate	Votes	%	±%
Republican	Fred E. Sterling (incumbent)	1,573,183	54.68%	
Democratic	Peter A. Waller	1,286,765	44.72%	
Socialist	William R. Snow	12,745	0.44%	
Workers	William Luigge	3,155	0.11%	
Socialist Labor	F. W. Shimbaugh	1,433	0.05%	
Majority		286,418	9.96%	
Turnout		2,877,281	100.00%	
Republican hold		Swing		

== See also ==
- 1928 Illinois gubernatorial election

== Bibliography ==
- Compiled by Louis L. Emmerson, Secretary of State (1928). Official vote of the State of Illinois cast at the General Election, Nov. 6, 1928; Judicial Elections, 1927-1928; Primary Elections: General Primary, April 10, 1928, Presidential Preference, April 10, 1928. Springfield, Illinois: Journal Printing Company.
