= 1920 United States presidential election in Michigan =

- November 2, 1920

All 15 Michigan votes to the Electoral College
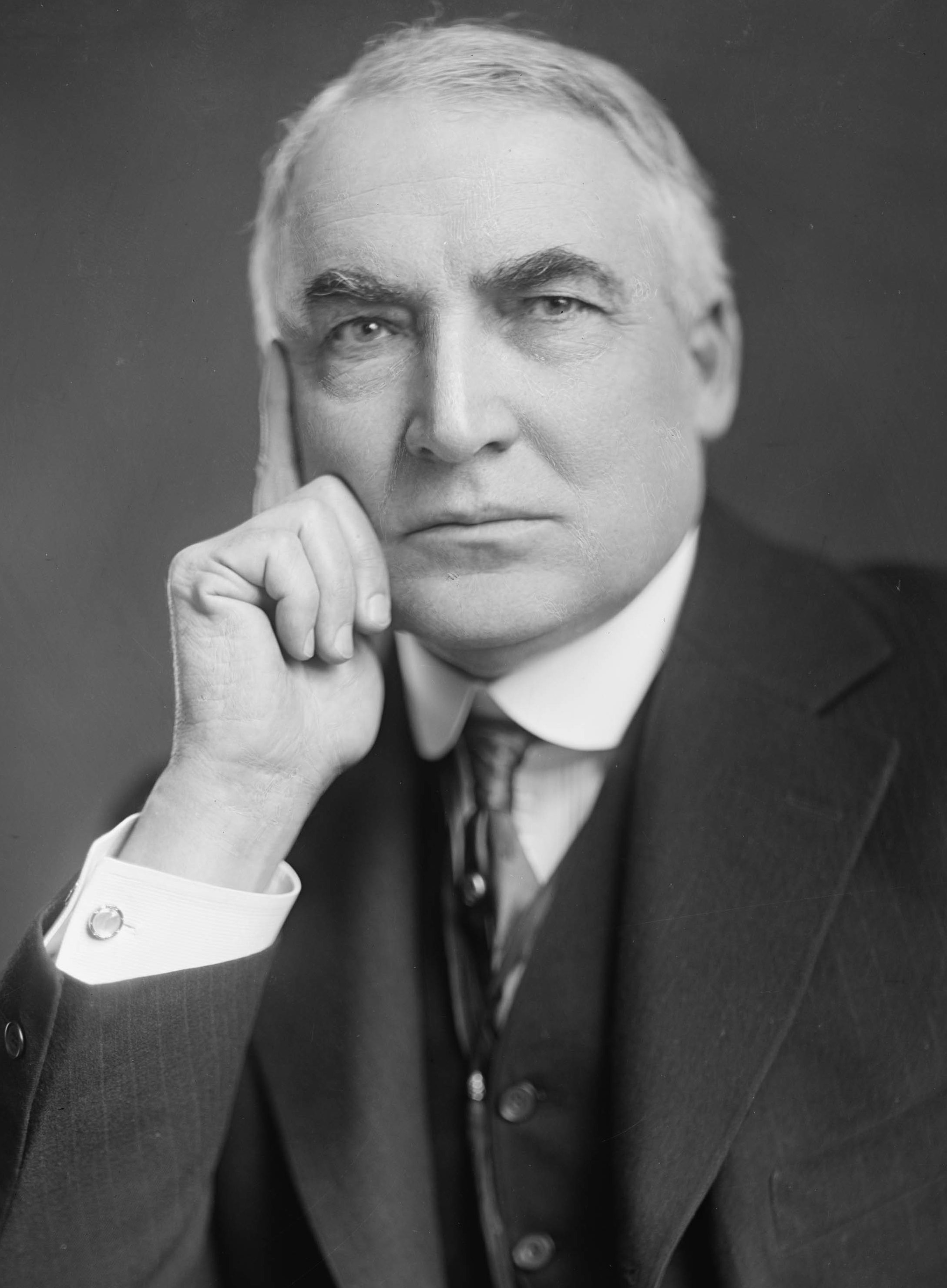

Nominee	Warren G. Harding	James M. Cox
Party	Republican	Democratic
Home state	Ohio	Ohio
Running mate	Calvin Coolidge	Franklin D. Roosevelt
Electoral vote	15	0
Popular vote	762,865	233,450
Percentage	72.76%	22.27%
County results
Harding
60–70%
70–80%
80–90%
90–100%
Cox
40–50%
President before election
Woodrow Wilson
Democratic
Elected President
Warren G. Harding
Republican

The 1920 United States presidential election in Michigan took place on November 2, 1920, as part of the 1920 United States presidential election. Voters chose 15 representatives, or electors, to the Electoral College, who voted for president and vice president.

Since the Panic of 1893 and the Populist movement, Michigan had been a rigidly one-party polity dominated by the Republican Party. In the 1894 elections, the Democratic Party lost all but one seat in the Michigan legislature, and the party would never make major gains there over the four ensuing decades.

The dominance of the culture of the Lower Peninsula by anti-slavery Yankees would be augmented by the turn of formerly Democratic-leaning German Catholics away from that party as a result of the remodelled party's agrarian and free silver sympathies, which became rigidly opposed by both the upper class and workers who followed them. At the same time, the Populist movement eliminated Democratic ties with the business and commerce of Michigan and other Northern states. Unlike the other states of the Upper Midwest, the Yankee influence on the culture of the Lower Peninsula was so strong that left-wing third parties did not provide significant opposition to the Republicans, nor was there more than a moderate degree of coordinated factionalism within the hegemonic Michigan Republican Party.

Although by taking a substantial proportion of the 1912 “Bull Moose” vote, incumbent president Woodrow Wilson had managed the best performance in Michigan by a Democrat since Grover Cleveland in 1888, 1918 saw a major reaction against Wilson throughout the Midwest, due to supposed preferential treatment of Southern farmers: Republicans would hold every seat in the State Senate for over a decade after the fall election, as they had between 1895 and 1897 and between 1905 and 1911.

During the 1920 election campaign, Michigan gained almost no attention because it had been so firmly Republican over the past quarter-century. A poll of four university students showed three voting for Republican candidate Warren G. Harding and one for Democratic opponent James M. Cox. A later poll in October showed that the very small August poll was not inaccurate, with Harding leading by slightly less than three-to-one. The Post-Crescent’s expectations were fulfilled, as Harding won in a landslide, with almost 73 percent of the vote to only 22.27 percent for Cox. Harding swept all of Michigan's 83 counties, receiving more than 60% of the vote in every county except for Manistee County. (Note: Whether Harding or Cox won Manistee County is debatable, see detailed section below.)

== Results ==
General Election Results
Party	Pledged to	Elector	Votes
Republican	Warren G. Harding	Walter J. Hayes	762,865
Republican	Warren G. Harding	Mary L. Veenflict	757,562
Republican	Warren G. Harding	Charles K. Warren	756,895
Republican	Warren G. Harding	George W. Cook	756,639
Republican	Warren G. Harding	Ferry K. Heath	756,569
Republican	Warren G. Harding	Charles F. Clippert	756,406
Republican	Warren G. Harding	Alfred M. Fleischhauer	756,215
Republican	Warren G. Harding	Eber W. Yost	755,736
Republican	Warren G. Harding	William T. Hosner	755,735
Republican	Warren G. Harding	Francis St. Peter	754,605
Republican	Warren G. Harding	Louie Vandervoot-Stegman	754,464
Republican	Warren G. Harding	Herman C. Buck	754,279
Republican	Warren G. Harding	Louisa Yeoman-King	754,132
Republican	Warren G. Harding	Grace Cookson-Stair	753,893
Republican	Warren G. Harding	Myron J. Sherwood	753,831
Democratic	James M. Cox	George J. Burke	233,450
Democratic	James M. Cox	Howard W. Cavanagh	232,230
Democratic	James M. Cox	Joses T. LaMeasure	232,121
Democratic	James M. Cox	Sidney T. Miller	232,079
Democratic	James M. Cox	William L. McManus Jr.	232,067
Democratic	James M. Cox	Charles V. Taylor	231,910
Democratic	James M. Cox	John Lennane	231,855
Democratic	James M. Cox	John George Zink	231,840
Democratic	James M. Cox	Estelle L. Moore	231,759
Democratic	James M. Cox	William H. Loutit	231,749
Democratic	James M. Cox	Albert S. Ley	231,741
Democratic	James M. Cox	August C. Goehrend	231,684
Democratic	James M. Cox	Lola K. Brown	231,677
Democratic	James M. Cox	Hattie B. Vanzelingen	231,673
Democratic	James M. Cox	Ethel G. Kelbie	231,672
Socialist	Eugene V. Debs	A. Glenn Berry	28,947
Socialist	Eugene V. Debs	Joseph W. Hawkins	28,534
Socialist	Eugene V. Debs	Violet M. Blumenbery	28,475
Socialist	Eugene V. Debs	Arthur A. Wood	28,469
Socialist	Eugene V. Debs	Frank H. Dixon	28,445
Socialist	Eugene V. Debs	Charles G. Taylor	28,439
Socialist	Eugene V. Debs	W. F. Long	28,419
Socialist	Eugene V. Debs	Otto J. Young	28,419
Socialist	Eugene V. Debs	W. W. Lloyd	28,417
Socialist	Eugene V. Debs	Ruby Grant	28,412
Socialist	Eugene V. Debs	William Cobine	28,395
Socialist	Eugene V. Debs	Frank Zeek	28,382
Socialist	Eugene V. Debs	Henry Pilch	28,372
Socialist	Eugene V. Debs	Inez Luther	28,369
Socialist	Eugene V. Debs	Ellsworth A. Kellogg	28,368
Farmer-Labor	Parley P. Christensen	Robert G. Ewald	10,480
Farmer-Labor	Parley P. Christensen	Joseph Obernwayer	10,372
Farmer-Labor	Parley P. Christensen	August Kleinow	10,193
Farmer-Labor	Parley P. Christensen	James Douglas	10,191
Farmer-Labor	Parley P. Christensen	Frank S. Lehnen	10,164
Farmer-Labor	Parley P. Christensen	Robert A. Washburn	10,157
Farmer-Labor	Parley P. Christensen	Albert L. Cheney	10,154
Farmer-Labor	Parley P. Christensen	Edmond L. Ege	10,153
Farmer-Labor	Parley P. Christensen	Henry F. Repke	10,152
Farmer-Labor	Parley P. Christensen	Arthur Darling	10,149
Farmer-Labor	Parley P. Christensen	Robert Legg	10,138
Farmer-Labor	Parley P. Christensen	Edward C. Scheid	10,120
Farmer-Labor	Parley P. Christensen	Albert Begin	10,031
Prohibition	Aaron S. Watkins	Lily M. McCone	9,646
Prohibition	Aaron S. Watkins	Mary J. Johnston	9,552
Prohibition	Aaron S. Watkins	William Calkins	9,541
Prohibition	Aaron S. Watkins	Elmer Scott	9,526
Prohibition	Aaron S. Watkins	Jarvis M. Green	9,523
Prohibition	Aaron S. Watkins	Adelaide Z. Sewell	9,516
Prohibition	Aaron S. Watkins	Ernest H. Clark	9,502
Prohibition	Aaron S. Watkins	Roseltha Huff	9,502
Prohibition	Aaron S. Watkins	Edith R. Luttenbacher	9,500
Prohibition	Aaron S. Watkins	M. Adelaide Titus	9,498
Prohibition	Aaron S. Watkins	Emir L. Wilder	9,485
Prohibition	Aaron S. Watkins	Alexander Peterkin	9,484
Prohibition	Aaron S. Watkins	John McCoil	9,470
Prohibition	Aaron S. Watkins	Frederick C. Nieman	9,468
Farmer-Labor	Parley P. Christensen	Oscar V. Schwensen	8,673 (Note: There were also 1,469 votes for "Olaf V. Schwensen" that were listed separately.)
Farmer-Labor	Parley P. Christensen	Edward W. Second	7,850 (Note: There were also 2,292 votes for "Eward W. Second" that were listed separately.)
Prohibition	Aaron S. Watkins	Lester G. Rathburn	7,078 (Note: There were also 2,427 votes for "Lester G. Rathbun" that were listed separately.)
Socialist Labor	William Wesley Cox	Charles Pierson	2,539
Socialist Labor	William Wesley Cox	D. Theofanis	2,361
Single Tax	Robert C. Macauley	William C. McCarthy	484
Single Tax	Robert C. Macauley	A. Lawrence Smith	464
Single Tax	Robert C. Macauley	Henry C. L. Forler	430
Single Tax	Robert C. Macauley	Ray Robson	429
Single Tax	Robert C. Macauley	Alexander S. Diack	424
Single Tax	Robert C. Macauley	Basil McKnight	419
Single Tax	Robert C. Macauley	Wilbur Brotherton	416
Single Tax	Robert C. Macauley	George D. Ball	414
Single Tax	Robert C. Macauley	James N. Symons	411
Single Tax	Robert C. Macauley	Elmer Letourneam	394
Write-in		Scattering	54
Votes cast (Note: Based on highest elector on each ticket)			1,048,465

=== Results by county ===
The results below are those for the highest elector on each ticket. The results listed in the 1921-1922 Michigan Manual are a "general average" for each ticket and thus not the "true" results.

County	Warren G. Harding Republican		James M. Cox Democratic		Eugene V. Debs Socialist		Parley P. Christensen Farmer-Labor		Aaron S. Watkins Prohibition		All Others Various		Margin		Total votes cast
County	#	%	#	%	#	%	#	%	#	%	#	%	#	%	Total votes cast
Alcona	1,048	75.67%	267	19.28%	41	2.96%	5	0.36%	14	1.01%	10	0.72%	781	56.39%	1,385
Alger	1,272	66.04%	471	24.45%	146	7.58%	23	1.19%	0	0.00%	14	0.73%	801	41.59%	1,926
Allegan	7,852	75.87%	2,158	20.85%	129	1.25%	29	0.28%	164	1.58%	17	0.16%	5,694	55.02%	10,349
Alpena	3,490	63.36%	1,907	34.62%	84	1.53%	7	0.13%	14	0.25%	6	0.11%	1,583	28.74%	5,508
Antrim	2,255	77.44%	519	17.82%	63	2.16%	9	0.31%	63	2.16%	3	0.10%	1,736	59.62%	2,912
Arenac	1,528	66.32%	673	29.21%	56	2.43%	12	0.52%	31	1.35%	4	0.17%	855	37.11%	2,304
Baraga	1,378	74.69%	307	16.64%	120	6.50%	25	1.36%	7	0.38%	8	0.43%	1,071	58.05%	1,845
Barry	5,169	70.61%	1,883	25.72%	45	0.61%	14	0.19%	207	2.83%	3	0.04%	3,286	44.88%	7,321
Bay	13,933	64.93%	7,011	32.67%	180	0.84%	207	0.96%	54	0.25%	75	0.35%	6,922	32.26%	21,460
Benzie	1,522	71.93%	423	19.99%	89	4.21%	29	1.37%	48	2.27%	5	0.24%	1,099	51.94%	2,116
Berrien	15,795	74.05%	4,866	22.81%	373	1.75%	87	0.41%	161	0.75%	48	0.23%	10,929	51.24%	21,330
Branch	5,712	69.72%	2,182	26.63%	79	0.96%	18	0.22%	196	2.39%	6	0.07%	3,530	43.09%	8,193
Calhoun	16,780	69.10%	6,314	26.00%	541	2.23%	170	0.70%	391	1.61%	87	0.36%	10,466	43.10%	24,283
Cass	4,515	64.71%	2,186	31.33%	153	2.19%	23	0.33%	84	1.20%	16	0.23%	2,329	33.38%	6,977
Charlevoix	3,090	77.00%	706	17.59%	136	3.39%	12	0.30%	59	1.47%	10	0.25%	2,384	59.41%	4,013
Cheboygan	2,487	63.41%	1,291	32.92%	61	1.56%	44	1.12%	28	0.71%	11	0.28%	1,196	30.49%	3,922
Chippewa	4,763	74.27%	1,281	19.98%	184	2.87%	78	1.22%	86	1.34%	21	0.33%	3,482	54.30%	6,413
Clare	1,772	73.50%	510	21.15%	80	3.32%	4	0.17%	28	1.16%	17	0.71%	1,262	52.34%	2,411
Clinton	6,039	78.91%	1,468	19.18%	40	0.52%	13	0.17%	90	1.18%	3	0.04%	4,571	59.73%	7,653
Crawford	730	64.49%	363	32.07%	25	2.21%	5	0.44%	9	0.80%	0	0.00%	367	32.42%	1,132
Delta	4,975	65.11%	2,029	26.55%	353	4.62%	199	2.60%	32	0.42%	53	0.69%	2,946	38.56%	7,641
Dickinson	3,571	76.29%	596	12.73%	360	7.69%	37	0.79%	46	0.98%	71	1.52%	2,975	63.55%	4,681
Eaton	7,376	70.98%	2,738	26.35%	93	0.90%	28	0.27%	149	1.43%	7	0.07%	4,638	44.63%	10,391
Emmet	3,075	68.87%	1,077	24.12%	188	4.21%	23	0.52%	87	1.95%	15	0.34%	1,998	44.75%	4,465
Genesee	24,604	74.60%	7,444	22.57%	545	1.65%	85	0.26%	250	0.76%	52	0.16%	17,160	52.03%	32,980
Gladwin	1,696	78.55%	317	14.68%	82	3.80%	6	0.28%	53	2.45%	5	0.23%	1,379	63.87%	2,159
Gogebic	5,569	79.57%	839	11.99%	375	5.36%	69	0.99%	88	1.26%	59	0.84%	4,730	67.58%	6,999
Grand Traverse	4,097	74.13%	1,163	21.04%	158	2.86%	20	0.36%	83	1.50%	6	0.11%	2,934	53.08%	5,527
Gratiot	6,583	77.38%	1,849	21.74%	42	0.49%	15	0.18%	17	0.20%	1	0.01%	4,734	55.65%	8,507
Hillsdale	6,717	71.13%	2,478	26.24%	56	0.59%	13	0.14%	172	1.82%	7	0.07%	4,239	44.89%	9,443
Houghton	14,976	80.18%	3,103	16.61%	380	2.03%	117	0.63%	85	0.46%	18	0.10%	11,873	63.56%	18,679
Huron	8,444	82.61%	1,597	15.62%	94	0.92%	20	0.20%	59	0.58%	8	0.08%	6,847	66.98%	10,222
Ingham	18,524	69.59%	7,093	26.65%	516	1.94%	90	0.34%	351	1.32%	44	0.17%	11,431	42.94%	26,618
Ionia	8,001	67.60%	3,405	28.77%	94	0.79%	23	0.19%	305	2.58%	8	0.07%	4,596	38.83%	11,836
Iosco	2,025	76.56%	551	20.83%	41	1.55%	15	0.57%	9	0.34%	4	0.15%	1,474	55.73%	2,645
Iron	3,548	82.68%	504	11.75%	176	4.10%	18	0.42%	14	0.33%	31	0.72%	3,044	70.94%	4,291
Isabella	5,113	73.80%	1,634	23.59%	73	1.05%	10	0.14%	87	1.26%	11	0.16%	3,479	50.22%	6,928
Jackson	16,020	64.97%	7,810	31.67%	293	1.19%	89	0.36%	413	1.67%	32	0.13%	8,210	33.30%	24,657
Kalamazoo	13,819	67.55%	5,283	25.83%	552	2.70%	521	2.55%	218	1.07%	63	0.31%	8,536	41.73%	20,456
Kalkaska	891	73.21%	225	18.49%	37	3.04%	9	0.74%	51	4.19%	4	0.33%	666	54.72%	1,217
Kent	40,802	70.14%	14,763	25.38%	973	1.67%	783	1.35%	713	1.23%	141	0.24%	26,039	44.76%	58,175
Keweenaw	1,274	90.10%	89	6.29%	39	2.76%	1	0.07%	10	0.71%	1	0.07%	1,185	83.80%	1,414
Lake	933	74.76%	263	21.07%	31	2.48%	11	0.88%	10	0.80%	0	0.00%	670	53.69%	1,248
Lapeer	5,558	78.54%	1,307	18.47%	39	0.55%	20	0.28%	146	2.06%	7	0.10%	4,251	60.07%	7,077
Leelanau	2,185	82.14%	415	15.60%	40	1.50%	4	0.15%	13	0.49%	3	0.11%	1,770	66.54%	2,660
Lenawee	12,004	68.86%	5,117	29.35%	85	0.49%	19	0.11%	192	1.10%	15	0.09%	6,887	39.51%	17,432
Livingston	4,654	64.19%	2,436	33.60%	12	0.17%	8	0.11%	136	1.88%	4	0.06%	2,218	30.59%	7,250
Luce	717	76.03%	193	20.47%	7	0.74%	3	0.32%	22	2.33%	1	0.11%	524	55.57%	943
Mackinac	1,685	62.87%	932	34.78%	37	1.38%	8	0.30%	15	0.56%	3	0.11%	753	28.10%	2,680
Macomb	9,791	74.03%	3,029	22.90%	184	1.39%	68	0.51%	117	0.88%	36	0.27%	6,762	51.13%	13,225
Manistee	3,274	57.65%	2,196	38.67%	151	2.66%	14	0.25%	35	0.62%	9	0.16%	1,078	18.98%	5,679
Marquette	9,368	70.54%	3,040	22.89%	542	4.08%	206	1.55%	89	0.67%	35	0.26%	6,328	47.65%	13,280
Mason	3,705	69.33%	1,360	25.45%	159	2.98%	21	0.39%	86	1.61%	13	0.24%	2,345	43.88%	5,344
Mecosta	3,951	74.82%	1,149	21.76%	113	2.14%	7	0.13%	59	1.12%	2	0.04%	2,802	53.06%	5,281
Menominee	5,089	72.46%	1,568	22.33%	243	3.46%	66	0.94%	32	0.46%	25	0.36%	3,521	50.14%	7,023
Midland	4,161	78.94%	967	18.35%	79	1.50%	12	0.23%	47	0.89%	5	0.09%	3,194	60.60%	5,271
Missaukee	1,812	82.48%	347	15.79%	14	0.64%	2	0.09%	22	1.00%	0	0.00%	1,465	66.68%	2,197
Monroe	8,671	61.38%	5,229	37.01%	119	0.84%	12	0.08%	93	0.66%	3	0.02%	3,442	24.36%	14,127
Montcalm	6,676	77.38%	1,694	19.64%	109	1.26%	18	0.21%	119	1.38%	11	0.13%	4,982	57.75%	8,627
Montmorency	844	75.56%	201	17.99%	55	4.92%	5	0.45%	10	0.90%	2	0.18%	643	57.56%	1,117
Muskegon	11,778	73.67%	3,494	21.86%	489	3.06%	57	0.36%	127	0.79%	42	0.26%	8,284	51.82%	15,987
Newaygo	4,200	78.87%	931	17.48%	82	1.54%	11	0.21%	94	1.77%	7	0.13%	3,269	61.39%	5,325
Oakland	19,349	70.90%	6,449	23.63%	926	3.39%	112	0.41%	385	1.41%	69	0.25%	12,900	47.27%	27,290
Oceana	3,562	77.94%	786	17.20%	101	2.21%	22	0.48%	89	1.95%	10	0.22%	2,776	60.74%	4,570
Ogemaw	1,695	75.50%	448	19.96%	43	1.92%	7	0.31%	45	2.00%	7	0.31%	1,247	55.55%	2,245
Ontonagon	1,996	67.87%	660	22.44%	215	7.31%	37	1.26%	15	0.51%	18	0.61%	1,336	45.43%	2,941
Osceola	3,612	80.81%	772	17.27%	35	0.78%	11	0.25%	38	0.85%	2	0.04%	2,840	63.53%	4,470
Oscoda	442	83.08%	77	14.47%	5	0.94%	3	0.56%	5	0.94%	0	0.00%	365	68.61%	532
Otsego	875	63.96%	468	34.21%	4	0.29%	10	0.73%	11	0.80%	0	0.00%	407	29.75%	1,368
Ottawa	10,566	78.75%	2,396	17.86%	207	1.54%	41	0.31%	182	1.36%	25	0.19%	8,170	60.89%	13,417
Presque Isle	2,523	80.68%	527	16.85%	36	1.15%	22	0.70%	6	0.19%	13	0.42%	1,996	63.83%	3,127
Roscommon	664	75.37%	185	21.00%	21	2.38%	3	0.34%	4	0.45%	4	0.45%	479	54.37%	881
Saginaw	20,529	68.20%	8,522	28.31%	583	1.94%	257	0.85%	144	0.48%	68	0.23%	12,007	39.89%	30,103
Sanilac	7,299	84.66%	1,152	13.36%	59	0.68%	7	0.08%	95	1.10%	10	0.12%	6,147	71.29%	8,622
Schoolcraft	1,797	71.11%	433	17.13%	235	9.30%	26	1.03%	16	0.63%	20	0.79%	1,364	53.98%	2,527
Shiawassee	7,221	69.92%	2,605	25.23%	143	1.38%	36	0.35%	313	3.03%	9	0.09%	4,616	44.70%	10,327
St. Clair	14,967	75.15%	4,568	22.94%	152	0.76%	84	0.42%	124	0.62%	21	0.11%	10,399	52.21%	19,916
St. Joseph	6,052	66.66%	2,723	29.99%	120	1.32%	24	0.26%	129	1.42%	31	0.34%	3,329	36.67%	9,079
Tuscola	7,310	82.38%	1,276	14.38%	62	0.70%	29	0.33%	164	1.85%	33	0.37%	6,034	68.00%	8,874
Van Buren	6,954	75.02%	2,007	21.65%	166	1.79%	17	0.18%	114	1.23%	11	0.12%	4,947	53.37%	9,269
Washtenaw	14,004	74.14%	4,518	23.92%	157	0.83%	9	0.05%	163	0.86%	37	0.20%	9,486	50.22%	18,888
Wayne	224,122	74.67%	52,529	17.50%	14,872	4.96%	6,124	2.04%	1,036	0.35%	1,453	0.48%	171,593	57.17%	300,136
Wexford	3,440	72.88%	1,108	23.47%	64	1.36%	22	0.47%	78	1.65%	8	0.17%	2,332	49.41%	4,720
Totals	762,865	72.76%	233,450	22.27%	28,947 (Note: The county results add up to 28,941)	2.76%	10,480	1.00%	9,646	0.92%	3,077	0.29%	529,415	50.49%	1,048,459

==== Counties that flipped from Democratic to Republican ====
- Arenac
- Calhoun
- Cass
- Crawford
- Jackson
- Kalamazoo
- Kent
- Monroe
- Otsego
- St. Joseph

== Analysis ==
With 72.76 percent of the popular vote, Michigan proved to be Harding's third strongest state in the 1920 election terms of popular vote percentage after North Dakota and Vermont.

Harding received the largest share of the popular vote in a presidential election for Michigan at the time, though that record would be broken four years later. Cox fell more than 3.5 percent below the previous worst Democratic showing by Alton B. Parker from 1904. This was the first of three consecutive elections where Michigan supported a Republican candidate with more than seventy percent of the vote and the only example of any presidential candidate receiving such a high share in the state.

Concurrent with Harding's triumph in the state, the Republicans would win every single seat in the State Senate, and the State House of Representatives.

=== Manistee county ===
Many sources show Cox carrying Manistee County by five votes. This result can be traced back to the 1921-1922 Michigan Official Directory and Legislative Manual (link included in references). However, during this era, Michigan was still voting for presidential electors directly and the Michigan Manuals reported only average votes per ticket in each county. In 1920, the votes received by Republican presidential electors in Manistee County varied considerably, from a high of 3,936 (for Mary L. Veenflict) to a low of 661 (for Myron J. Sherwood). The following table shows the Republican and Democratic vote in Manistee County in 1920:

1920 United States presidential election in Manistee County
Republican		Democratic	
Elector	Votes	Elector	Votes
Mary L. Veenflict	3,936	George J. Burke	2,196
Walter J. Hayes	3,274	Joses T. La Measure	2,189
Ferry K. Heath	3,184	John Lennane	2,187
Alfred M. Fleischhauer	3,125	William H. Loutit	2,185
Charles K. Warren	2,713	Charles V. Taylor	2,185
Charles F. Clippert	2,613	August C. Goehrend	2,184
George W. Cook	2,459	William L. McManus Jr.	2,184
Eber W. Yost	2,267	Sidney T. Miller	2,184
William T. Hosner	2,209	John George Zink	2,184
Francis St. Peter	1,695	Estelle L. Moore	2,183
Louie Vandervoot-Stegman	1,425	Lola K. Brown	2,182
Louisa Yeoman-King	1,231	Howard W. Cavanagh	2,182
Grace Cookson-Stair	975	Albert S. Ley	2,182
Herman C. Buck	931	Hattie B. Vanzelingen	2,181
Myron J. Sherwood	661	Ethel G. Kelbie	2,180
Total	32,698	Total	32,768

Based on these figures, the average vote is 2,180 for Harding and 2,185 for Cox (the 1921-22 Manual lists 2,179 and 2,184, respectively, by rounding down). However, the usual convention for reporting on presidential elections from before the introduction of the modern short ballot is to use the results for the elector on each ticket who received the most votes statewide. Following that convention, the results in Manistee County are 3,274 for Harding and 2,196 for Cox (as shown in the full county by county table above). However, there were ultimately more total Democratic votes than Republican votes recorded in the county, so that gives some support to a potential Cox victory.

Michigan also held simultaneous elections for state officers in 1920. In the gubernatorial election, for instance, the vote in Manistee County was 59.88% Republican and 38.16% Democratic. Similar results were polled in other races. Thus, Cox winning Manistee County in the presidential election would be entirely inconsistent with the rest of the results in Michigan. Indeed, following the highest elector convention results in the split in Manistee County being 57.65% for Harding and 38.67% for Cox, which is consistent with the other statewide elections.

== See also ==
- United States presidential elections in Michigan
