= 1932 Illinois lieutenant gubernatorial election =

- November 8, 1932
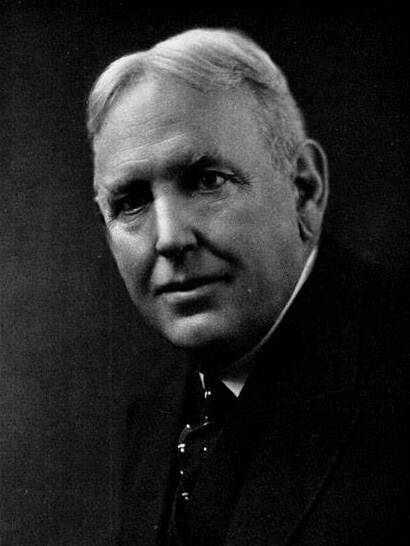

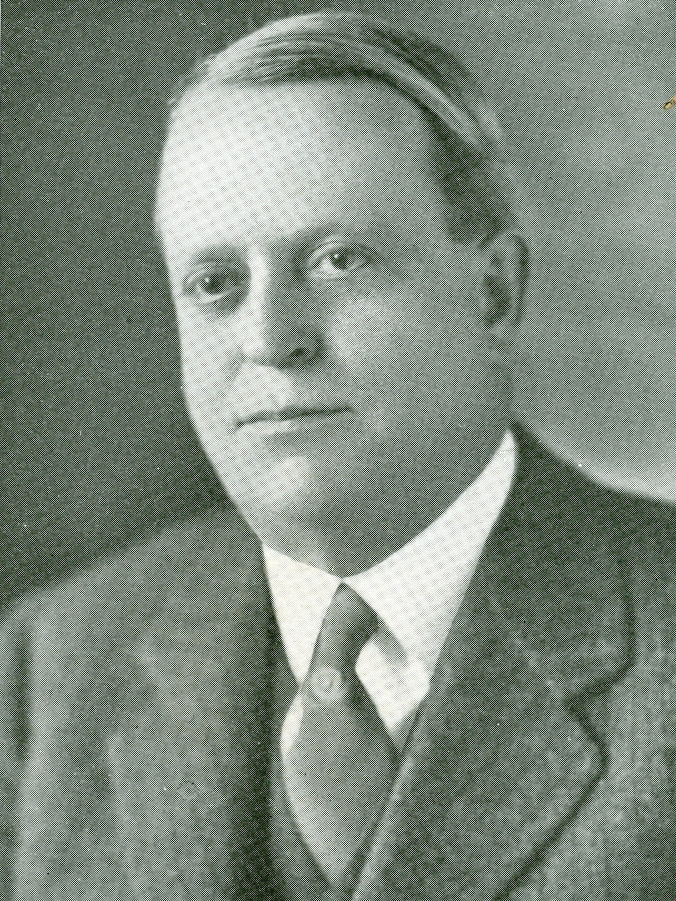
Nominee	Thomas Donavan	Fred E. Sterling
Party	Democratic	Republican
Popular vote	1,686,265	1,444,133
Percentage	52.95%	45.35%
Lieutenant Governor before election
Fred E. Sterling
Republican
Elected Lieutenant Governor
Thomas Donavan
Democratic

The 1932 Illinois gubernatorial election was held on November 8, 1932. It saw the election of Democrat Thomas Donavan, who defeated incumbent Republican lieutenant governor Fred E. Sterling.

== Primary elections ==
Primary elections were held on April 12, 1932.

=== Democratic primary ===
==== Candidates ====
- Thomas F. Donovan, Democratic nominee for Attorney General of Illinois in 1924
- Jay J. McCarthy
- Wallace G. McCauley
- Thomas O'Connor
- Neil J. O'Hanley

===== Withdrew =====
- James A. McCallum

==== Results ====
Democratic primary results
Party	Candidate	Votes	%
Democratic	Thomas F. Donovan	378,325	58.02
Democratic	Thomas O'Connor	138,249	21.20
Democratic	Jay J. McCarthy	62,570	9.60
Democratic	Wallace G. McCauley	39,001	5.98
Democratic	Neil J. O'Hanley	33,859	5.19
Total votes		652,004	100.00

=== Republican primary ===
==== Candidates ====
- Edward C. Longfellow
- Theodore D. Smith, unsuccessful candidate for Republican nomination for lieutenant governor in 1928
- Fred E. Sterling, incumbent lieutenant governor
- Guy M. Talcott
- James C. White
- Abraham Lincoln Wisler, unsuccessful candidate for Republican nomination for U.S. Senate in 1930

==== Results ====
Republican primary results
Party	Candidate	Votes	%
Republican	Fred E. Sterling (incumbent)	708,932	70.84
Republican	Theodore D. Smith	91,451	9.14
Republican	Edward C. Longfellow	68,128	6.81
Republican	James C. White	62,544	6.25
Republican	Abraham Lincoln Wisler	37,076	3.70
Republican	Guy M. Talcott	32,682	3.27
Total votes		1,000,813	100.00

== General election ==
=== Major candidates ===
- Thomas F. Donovan, Democratic
- Fred E. Sterling, Republican

=== Minor candidates ===
- Arthur Herchy, Communist
- Meyer Halushka, Socialist, high school teacher
- Frank Schnur, Socialist Labor, nominee for Attorney General of Illinois in 1928

=== Results ===
1932 Illinois lieutenant gubernatorial election
Party	Candidate	Votes	%	±%
Democratic	Thomas F. Donovan	1,686,265	52.95%	
Republican	Fred E. Sterling (incumbent)	1,444,133	45.35%	
Socialist	Meyer Halushka	38,163	1.20%	
Communist	Arthur Herchy	13,012	0.41%	
Socialist Labor	Frank Schnur	3,077	0.10%	
	Scattering	2	0.00%	
Majority		242,132	7.60%	
Turnout		3,184,652	100.00%	
Democratic gain from Republican		Swing		

== See also ==
- 1932 Illinois gubernatorial election

== Bibliography ==
- Samuel K. Gove, ed. (1959). Illinois Votes 1900-1958: A Compilation of Illinois Election Statistics. Urbana-Champaign, Illinois: University of Illinois.
- Compiled by William J. Stratton, Secretary of State (1932). Official vote of the State of Illinois cast at the General Election, Nov. 8, 1932; Judicial Elections, 1931-1932; Primary Elections: General Primary, April 12, 1932, Presidential Preference, April 12, 1932. Springfield, Illinois: Journal Printing Company.
