= Single tax party =

These organizations were at one time called the Single tax party:

- Justice Party of Denmark
- Single Tax Party of the USA
