= Ramme =

Ramme may refer to:

- Ramme (river), a river in Lower Saxony, Germany

== People with the surname ==
- Ernest Ramme (1916–2004), United States Air Force General
- Jens Ramme (born 1963), German former footballer
- Walter Ramme (1895-date of death unknown), German freestyle swimmer who competed in the 1912 Summer Olympics
- Willy Adolf Theodor Ramme (1887–1953), German entomologist

== See also ==
- Ramme Gaard, an organic farm and country estate, located just north of Hvitsten in Akershus municipality, on the coast of Norway
