= Thomas Donovan (politician) =

American politician

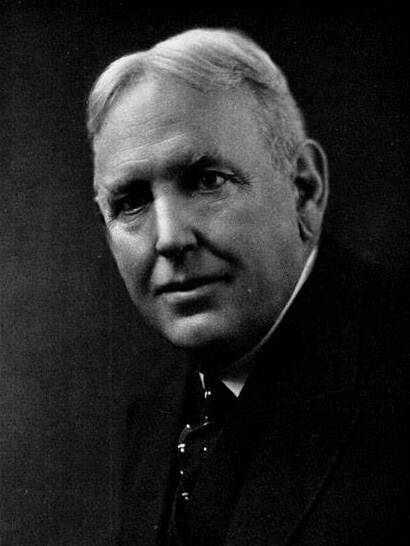
- Official portrait, 1933

33rd Lieutenant Governor of Illinois
- In office January 9, 1933 – January 4, 1937
- Governor: Henry Horner
- Preceded by: Fred E. Sterling
- Succeeded by: John Henry Stelle

Personal details
- Born: Thomas Fanning Donovan; December 17, 1869 Charlotte, Illinois, U.S.
- Died: November 17, 1946 (aged 76) Chicago, Illinois, U.S.
- Party: Democratic
- Spouse(s): Alice Aaron (m. 1894; died 1901) Gertrude M. Nugent (m. 1905)
- Children: 4
- Parent(s): Patrick Donovan; Rachael Purcell
- Education: Valparaiso University
- Profession: Politician, businessman, lawyer

Thomas Fanning Donovan (December 17, 1869 – November 17, 1946) was an American politician, businessman, and lawyer.

Donovan was born in Charlotte, Illinois on a farm to parents Patrick and Rachael (Purcell) Donovan and had seven siblings. He was educated in the public schools in Chatsworth, Illinois in Livingston County, Illinois. He then received his bachelor's degree from Valparaiso University in 1893 and then taught school in Danforth, Illinois. He then studied law and was admitted to the Illinois bar in 1895. He was the city attorney of Kankakee, Illinois and then was involved in the banking business in Joliet, Illinois. He also chairman of the Joliet Police and Fire Commission and was involved with the Democratic Party. In 1924, Donovan ran for Illinois attorney general and lost the election. From 1933 to 1937, Donovan served as lieutenant governor of Illinois. He died in Chicago, Illinois.

== Personal life ==
In 1894 Donovan married Alice Aaron. The couple had two daughters, Grace and Gertrude, before Alice died in 1901. In 1905 he married Gertrude M. Nugent and they had two sons, Thomas J. and James.

Donovan was a member of the Roman Catholic Church, the Knights of Columbus, and the Benevolent and Protective Order of Elks.

== Notes ==
Party political offices
Preceded by James T. Burns	Democratic nominee for Attorney General of Illinois; 1924	Succeeded by Thomas J. Courtney
Preceded by Peter A. Waller	Democratic nominee for Lieutenant Governor of Illinois; 1932	Succeeded by John Henry Stelle
Political offices
Preceded by Fred E. Sterling	Lieutenant Governor of Illinois; 1933–1937	Succeeded by John H. Stelle
