= Charlotte, Illinois =

- Unincorporated community
- Location within Illinois Location within the United States
- Coordinates: 40°49′11″N 88°17′20″W
- Country: United States
- State: Illinois
- County: Livingston
- Township: Charlotte
- Elevation: 659 ft (201 m)
- Time zone: UTC-6 (Central (CST))
  - Summer (DST): UTC-5 (CDT)
- Area codes: 815 & 779
- GNIS feature ID: 405985

Charlotte is an unincorporated community in Livingston County, Illinois, United States.

== Notable people ==
- Thomas Donovan, Lieutenant Governor of Illinois, was born in Charlotte.
