= Norman L. Jones =

American politician and judge (1870–1940)

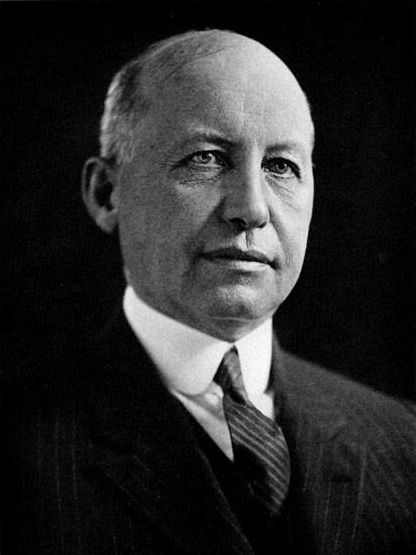
- Jones circa 1924

Supreme Court of Illinois Judge
- In office 1931 – November 15, 1940

Illinois Appellate Court Judge

Illinois Circuit Court Judge

Member of the Illinois House of Representatives
- In office 1893–1985

State's Attorney of Greene County, Illinois

City Attorney of Carrollton, Illinois

Personal details
- Born: September 19, 1870 Kankakee County, Illinois, U.S.
- Died: November 15, 1940 (aged 70)
- Party: Democratic Party
- Education: United States Military Academy, Valparaiso University

Norman Lemuel Jones (September 19, 1870 – November 15, 1940) was an American politician and jurist.

Born in Patterson, Illinois, Jones and his family moved to Carrollton, Illinois in 1872. Jones was educated at Valparaiso University and the United States Military Academy. He studied law with Henry Thomas Rainey, who later served as speaker of the United States House of Representatives. Jones was admitted to the Illinois bar in 1896. Jones served as city attorney for Carrollton, Illinois and as state's attorney for Greene County, Illinois. In 1893 and 1895, Jones served in the Illinois House of Representatives and was a Democrat. In 1924, Jones was the Democratic nominee for governor of Illinois. He served as Illinois Circuit Court judge and as Illinois Appellate Court judge. From 1931 until his death in 1940, Jones served on the Illinois Supreme Court.

== Notes ==
Party political offices
Preceded by J. Hamilton Lewis	Democratic nominee for Governor of Illinois; 1924	Succeeded by Floyd Thompson
