= Fred E. Sterling =

American journalist

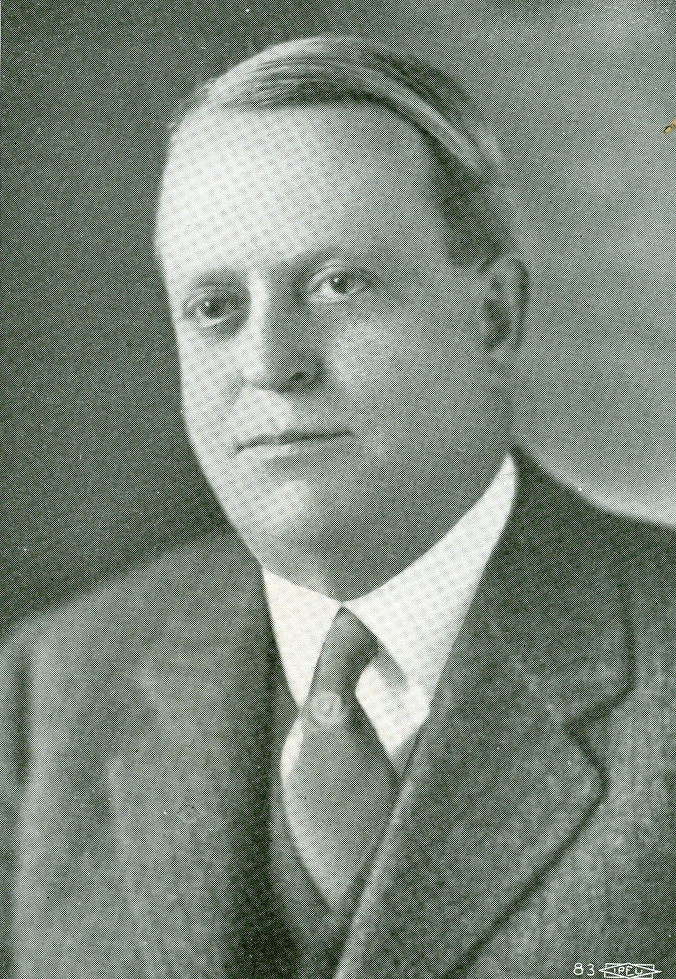
- Sterling circa 1919

31st Lieutenant Governor of Illinois
- In office 1921–1933
- Governor: Len Small, Louis Lincoln Emmerson
- Preceded by: John G. Oglesby
- Succeeded by: Thomas Donovan

23rd Treasurer of Illinois
- In office 1919–1921
- Governor: Frank O. Lowden
- Preceded by: Len Small
- Succeeded by: Edward E. Miller

Personal details
- Born: June 29, 1869 Dixon, Illinois, U.S.
- Died: February 10, 1934 (aged 64) Rockford, Illinois, U.S.
- Occupation: Newspaper editor, politician

Fred E. Sterling (June 29, 1869 – February 10, 1934) was an American newspaper editor and politician.

Born in Dixon, Illinois, Sterling moved with his family to a farm in Huron, South Dakota when he was 11. Sterling was a newspaper editor in Rockford, Illinois and started the Rockford Register-Gazette. Sterling was involved with the Republican Party. He served on the Rockford City Council. In 1917, Sterling was appointed to the Illinois Public Utilities Commission and then in 1919 was elected Illinois State Treasurer. He then served as Lieutenant Governor of Illinois from 1921 until 1933. He died in Rockford, Illinois due to a heart ailment and high blood pressure.

He was indicted for embezzlement after he left office as state treasurer, but the charges were not pursued while another embezzlement case against Illinois governor Len Small was under way. After that case was settled, Sterling's case was dismissed by Illinois Attorney General Oscar Carlstrom, but Carlstrom's successor, Otto Kerner, reinstated the charges, and they were still pending when Sterling died.

== Notes ==
Party political offices
Preceded by Len Small	Republican nominee for Illinois Treasurer; 1918	Succeeded by Edward E. Miller
Preceded by John G. Oglesby	Republican nominee for Lieutenant Governor of Illinois; 1920, 1924, 1928, 1932	Succeeded by George Hatzenbuhler
Political offices
Preceded by Len Small	Treasurer of Illinois; 1919–1921	Succeeded by Edward E. Miller
Preceded by John G. Oglesby	Lieutenant Governor of Illinois; 1921–1933	Succeeded by Thomas Donovan
