= Streator Township High School =

Coordinates: 41°7′37.1″N 88°50′12.3″W

Location
- 202 W Lincoln Ave; Streator, Illinois; United States

Information
- Type: Public Secondary
- Established: 1875
- Locale: District
- Principal: Amy Jo Lotshaw
- Superintendent: Scott Cameron
- Teaching staff: 56.34 (FTE)
- Grades: 9-12
- Enrollment: 781 (2023-2024)
- Student to teacher ratio: 13.86
- Colors: Red and white
- Mascot: Bulldog
- Yearbook: Hardscrabble

Streator Township High School, also known as Streator High School (SHS), is a high school located in Streator, Illinois, approximately 90 miles southwest of Chicago.

== History ==
The school is named after its city's namesake, Worthy S. Streator. The original building for the school was financed by Streator's founder, Ralph Plumb. The school graduated its first class in 1876. There were seven students: one boy and six girls.

In 2012, the Men's Varsity Basketball team took home its first Regional Championship since 1969, by defeating Pontiac, 61–59.

== Notable alumni ==
- Doug Dieken - Pro football player with the Cleveland Browns
- Thurlow Essington - Illinois lawyer and state senator
- Rube Novotney - Former MLB player (Chicago Cubs)
- Ernest Ramme - United States Air Force Brigader General
- Adam Shabala - Former MLB player (San Francisco Giants)
- Clay Zavada - Former MLB player and current minor league player (Arizona Diamondbacks)
