= Ernest Ramme =

Ernest Lester Ramme
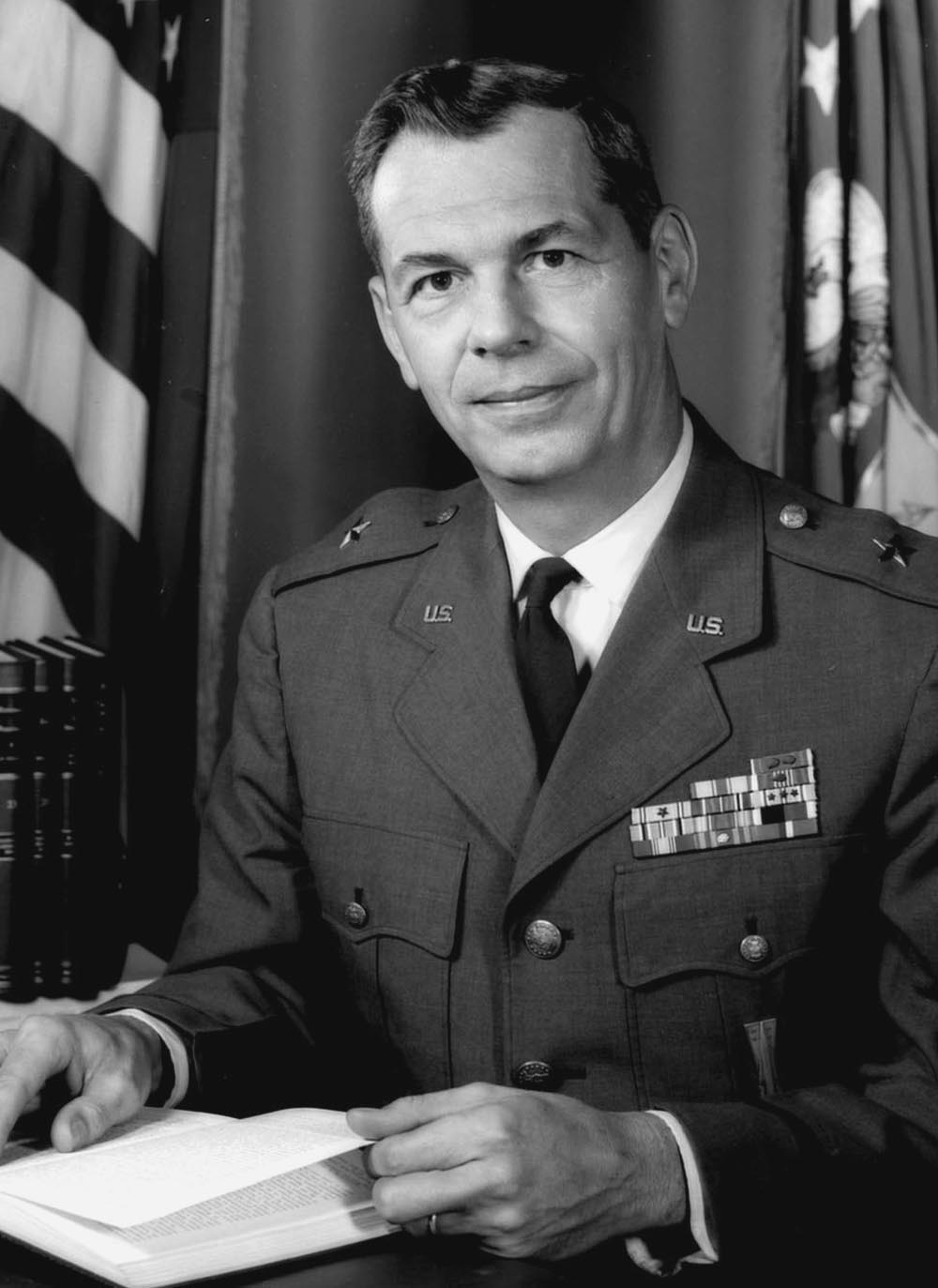
- General Ernest Lester Ramme in 2010
- Born: August 31, 1916; Streator, Illinois, U.S.
- Died: April 21, 2004 (aged 87); Sun City, Arizona, U.S.
- Burial place: Sunland Memorial Park, Sun City, Arizona, U.S.
- Spouse: Ann Marie Zapponi
- Military career
- Allegiance: United States
- Branch: Illinois National Guard; United States Army; United States Air Force
- Service years: 1936-1968
- Rank: Second lieutenant, Army; First lieutenant, Army; Captain, Army; Major, Army; Lieutenant Colonel, Army; Colonel, Air Force; Brigadier General, Air Force
- Units: 3rd Field Artillery Regiment; Headquarters Battery, 83rd Field Artillery Regiment; Military North African Mission; Military Iranian Mission; United States Army Services of Supply, Southwest Pacific Area; U.S. Army Forces Far East; Sacramento Air Materiel Area; Far East Air Forces; Oklahoma City Air Materiel Area, Altus Air Force Base, Oklahoma; San Antonio Air Materiel Area; Headquarters, U.S. Air Force
- Commands: Headquarters Battery, 83rd Field Artillery Regiment; Field Headquarters, Military Iranian Mission; Site Activation Task Force, Altus Air Force Base, Oklahoma; Site Activation Task Force, McConnell Air Force Base, Kansas
- Conflicts: World War II; Korean War; Cold War
- Awards: Legion of Merit with two oak clusters

Ernest Lester Ramme (31 August 1916 – 21 April 2004) was a United States Army and United States Air Force officer with a career spanning thirty years.

== Family and ancestry ==
Ramme was born to Otto and Cora Corrigan Ramme in Streator, Illinois. His father was a farmer, living his whole life on the family homestead in Livingston County, Illinois. The homestead was settled by his grandfather, Ernest August Ramme, who came from Germany in 1867. His mother was a local girl. They were Catholic. He married Ann Marie Zapponi 22 November 1944 in Comanche County, Oklahoma. They had four daughters.

== Education ==
In 1935, at the age of 18, Ramme graduated from the Streator High School. He enrolled in the agriculture school at the University of Illinois in Champaign, Illinois, in 1936. During college, he joined the Illinois National Guard while also studying in the Reserve Officers' Training Corps (ROTC) program. In 1939, at the age of 22, he graduated from the University of Illinois with a bachelor of science degree, with honors.

== Military service ==
=== pre-War ===
Upon graduation, Ramme was commissioned a second lieutenant in the Field Artillery Reserve and reported to the 3rd Field Artillery Regiment at Fort Sheridan, Illinois. In 1940, he was commissioned as a second lieutenant in the Regular Army. He was given his first command as commanding officer of Headquarters Battery, 83rd Field Artillery Regiment, and he attended the Field Artillery Communications School. In August 1941 he was assigned to the Special Observer Group (SPOBS) and sent to Egypt, where he established a communications school for the British and served as an adviser on communications matters. While in Egypt, he was awarded his first Legion of Merit.

=== World War II ===
With the United States entry into the war, he became commander of the field headquarters, U.S. Iranian Mission at Basra, Iraq. He was now 25 years old. The following year he was sent to India, assigned to the United States Army Services of Supply, Southwest Pacific Area, which provided logistics support to U.S. forces in China, Burma and India. He served there for two years and was promoted to captain, major and lieutenant colonel. He was also awarded his second Legion of Merit. In 1945, at the age of 28, he attended the United States Army Field Artillery School at Fort Sill, Oklahoma. He married during this time in Oklahoma. After finishing his studies, he was assigned to General MacArthur's headquarters in the Commonwealth of the Philippines, where he served as an assistant in logistics planning until the end of the war.

=== Interwar Years ===
After the war, Ramme attended the United States Army Command and General Staff College at Fort Leavenworth, Kansas. He then transferred to Japan as part of Operation Blacklist, the code name for the occupation of Japan. He worked for the logistics staff of the Supreme Commander for the Allied Powers (SCAP), General MacArthur. In 1947, he was assigned to the Pentagon and moved to the newly minted United States Air Force. During this period he also graduated from the University of Pittsburgh, Pittsburgh, Pennsylvania, and received a Master of Letters degree in business administration.

=== Korean War ===
At the age of 34, he became Director of Supply and Transportation, Sacramento Air Matériel Area, McClellan Air Force Base, California. With the primary responsibility of supporting the US Air Force's Korean War efforts, he served in that role from 1951 to 1954.

=== Cold War ===
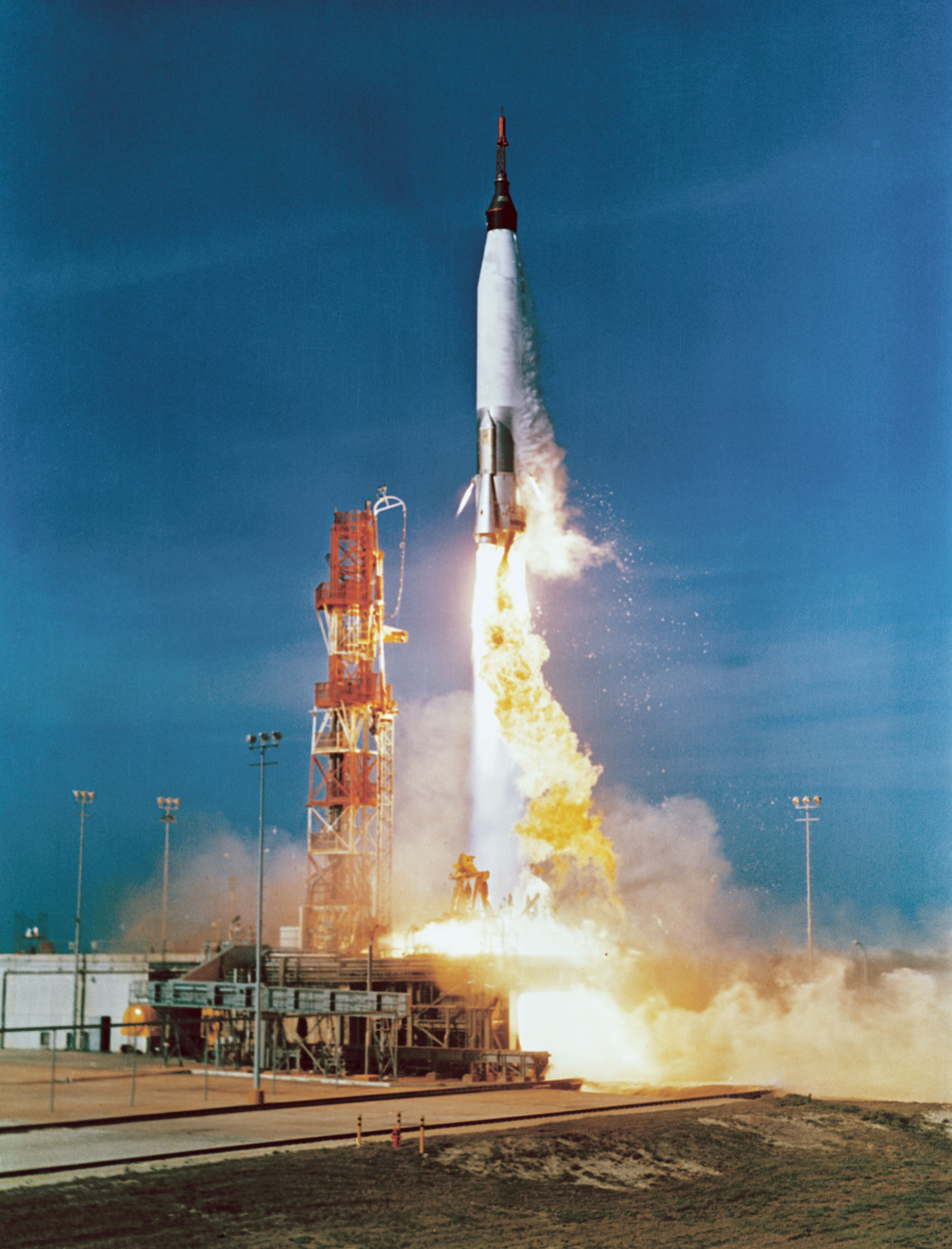
Atlas ICBM Launch, ca. 1962

At the age of 37, Ramme was sent back to Japan. From 1954 to 1957 he was Director of Supply and Services, Far East Air Forces. From 1958-1960 he served as Director of Supply and Transportation, Oklahoma City Air Matériel Area, Altus Air Force Base, Oklahoma. At the age of 43, he transferred to the Strategic Air Command (SAC) and took on a new role. Ramme was given command of a Site Activation Task Force for Altus Air Force Base and was responsible getting an Atlas F ICBM Squadron up and running. It was completed in July 1962 and included twelve missile silos. Afterwards, he was given command of another Site Activation Task Force, this time at McConnell Air Force Base, Kansas. From 1962 to 1963, he oversaw the installation and turnover of a Titan II ICBM Wing. It was turned over in October 1963 and also included twelve silos. Ramme was assigned as Director of Matériel Management, and then Deputy Commander, San Antonio Air Matériel Area, Texas. In September 1964 he was assigned as Director of Supply and Services, Headquarters, U.S. Air Force. During this time he was a member of the Army and Air Force (Exchange and Motion Picture Services) Board of Directors (AAFBD) and a member of the President's Committee on Purchases of Blind-Made Products. He retired in 1968 at the age of 51.

== Retirement and Beyond ==
Ramme was an active volunteer and churchgoer. He drove the Red Cross van, did Recordings for the Blind, and attended St. Elizabeth Seton Catholic Church. General Ramme died at Sun City, Arizona, on 21 April 2004 and is buried in Sunland Memorial Park, Sun City, Arizona.
