= 1928 Illinois gubernatorial election =

- November 6, 1928
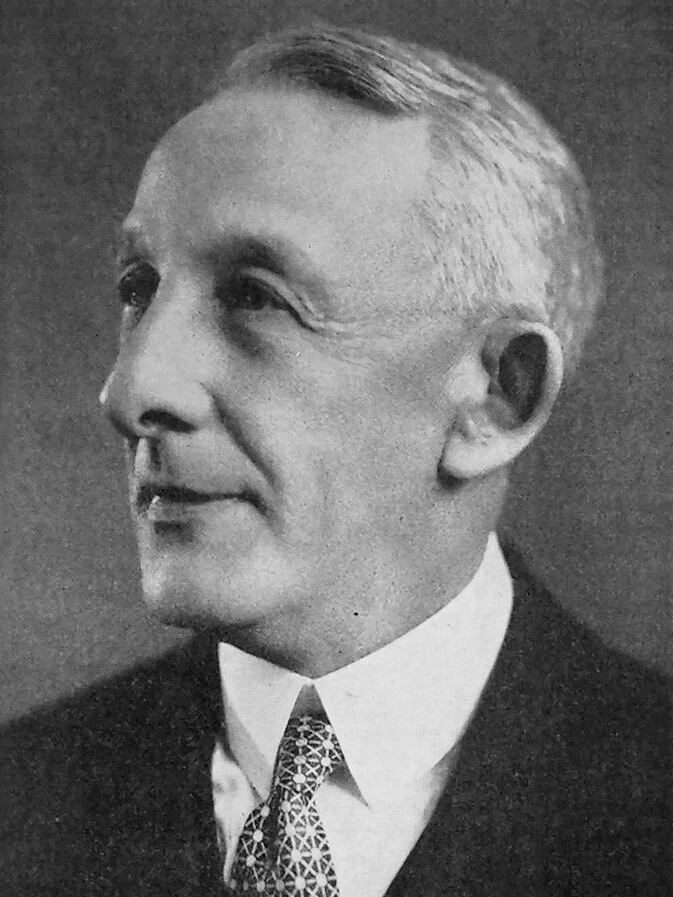

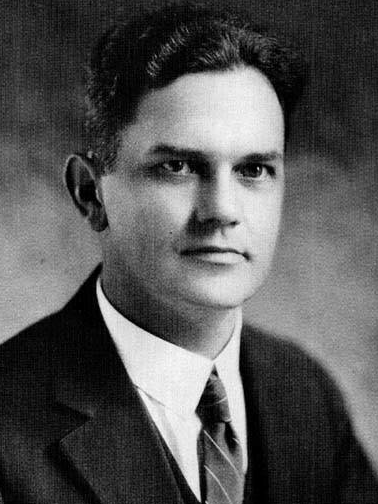
Nominee	Louis Lincoln Emmerson	Floyd E. Thompson
Party	Republican	Democratic
Popular vote	1,709,818	1,284,897
Percentage	56.76%	42.66%
- County results Emmerson: 40–50% 50–60% 60–70% 70–80% 80–90% Thompson: 40–50% 50–60% 60–70%
Governor before election
Len Small
Republican
Elected Governor
Louis Lincoln Emmerson
Republican

The 1928 Illinois gubernatorial election was held on November 6, 1928. Incumbent two-term Republican Governor Len Small was defeated in the Republican primary. Republican nominee Louis Lincoln Emmerson defeated Democratic nominee Floyd E. Thompson with 56.76% of the vote.

== Primary elections ==
Primary elections were held on April 10, 1928.

=== Democratic primary ===
==== Candidates ====
- Floyd E. Thompson, justice of the Supreme Court of Illinois

==== Results ====
Democratic primary results
Party	Candidate	Votes	%
Democratic	Floyd E. Thompson	244,082	99.99
	Scattering	13	0.01
Total votes		244,095	100.00

=== Republican primary ===
==== Candidates ====
- Louis Lincoln Emmerson, incumbent Secretary of State of Illinois
- Len Small, incumbent Governor

==== Results ====
Republican primary results
Party	Candidate	Votes	%
Republican	Louis Lincoln Emmerson	1,051,556	63.22
Republican	Len Small (incumbent)	611,763	36.78
Total votes		1,663,319	100.00

=== Independent Republican primary ===
==== Candidates ====
- Louis Lincoln Emmerson, incumbent Secretary of State of Illinois
- Len Small, incumbent Governor

==== Results ====
Independent Republican primary results
Party	Candidate	Votes	%
Independent Republican	Louis Lincoln Emmerson	50	55.56
Independent Republican	Len Small (incumbent)	34	37.78
	Scattering	6	6.67
Total votes		90	100.00

== General election ==
=== Major candidates ===
- Floyd E. Thompson, Democratic
- Louis Lincoln Emmerson, Republican

=== Minor candidates ===
- George Koop, Socialist, nominee for U.S. Senate in 1924 and Chicago mayor in 1907
- J. E. Procum, Socialist Labor, nominee for U.S. House in 1924 in the at-large district
- William F. Kruse, Workers Party of America, Party District Organizer for the Chicago district

=== Results ===
1928 Illinois gubernatorial election
Party	Candidate	Votes	%	±%
Republican	Louis Lincoln Emmerson	1,709,818	56.76%	
Democratic	Floyd E. Thompson	1,284,897	42.66%	
Socialist	George Koop	12,974	0.43%	
Workers	William F. Kruse	3,153	0.10%	
Socialist Labor	J. E. Procum	1,361	0.05%	
Majority		424,921	14.10%	
Turnout		3,012,203	100.00%	
Republican hold		Swing		

== See also ==
- 1928 Illinois lieutenant gubernatorial election

== Bibliography ==
- Glashan, Roy R. (1979). American Governors and Gubernatorial Elections, 1775-1978. Meckler Books. ISBN 0-930466-17-9.
- Samuel K. Gove, ed. (1959). Illinois Votes 1900-1958: A Compilation of Illinois Election Statistics. Urbana-Champaign, Illinois: University of Illinois.
- Compiled by Louis L. Emmerson, Secretary of State (1928). Official vote of the State of Illinois cast at the General Election, Nov. 6, 1928; Judicial Elections, 1927-1928; Primary Elections: General Primary, April 10, 1928, Presidential Preference, April 10, 1928. Springfield, Illinois: Journal Printing Company.
