= George A. Cooke =

American judge (1869–1938)

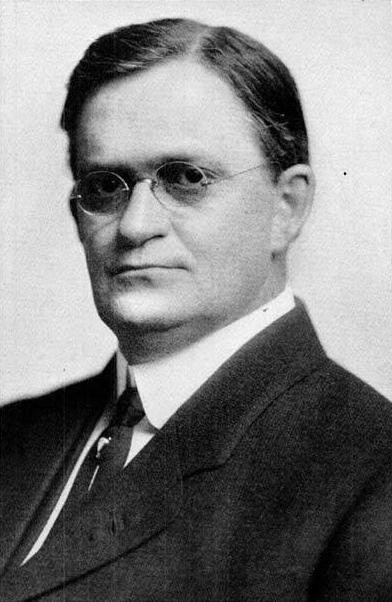
- Cooke's official photograph, c. 1917

Chief Justice of the Supreme Court of Illinois
- In office 1913–1914

Justice of the Supreme Court of Illinois
- In office 1909–1918
- Preceded by: Guy C. Scott

Member of the Illinois House of Representatives from the 33rd district
- In office 1902–1909

Personal details
- Born: George Anderson Cooke; July 3, 1869 New Athens, Ohio, U.S.
- Died: December 6, 1938 (aged 69)
- Spouse: Sarah Blee
- Children: 4
- Education: Knox College
- Profession: Politician, lawyer, judge

George Anderson Cooke (July 3, 1869 – December 6, 1938) was a member of the Illinois General Assembly 1902-1909 and a judge of the Illinois Supreme Court 1909-1918, serving as chief justice 1913-1914.

== Biography ==
Born in New Athens, Ohio, both of Cooke's parents died when he was 11 years old, and he was sent to live in Mercer County, Illinois. He was educated at Knox College, graduating in 1892.

Cooke was admitted to the bar of Illinois in 1895 and established a law practice in Aledo, Illinois. In 1902, he was elected to the Illinois House of Representatives, representing the 33rd District. He served two terms.

Upon the death of Justice Guy C. Scott of the Illinois Supreme Court in 1909, Cooke ran for and won election to the Fourth District of the Illinois Supreme Court. Cooke served out the remainder of Justice Scott's term and then won re-election to a full term in 1912. He served as chief justice of the court for two consecutive terms in 1913 and 1914.

In 1918, Cooke left the bench to become chief counsel of the Peoples Gas Light and Coke Company, a position he held for the next twenty years until his death.

Cooke was married to Sarah Blee. Together, they had four children. He died in his home on December 6, 1938.
