= Thurlow Essington =

American lawyer and politician

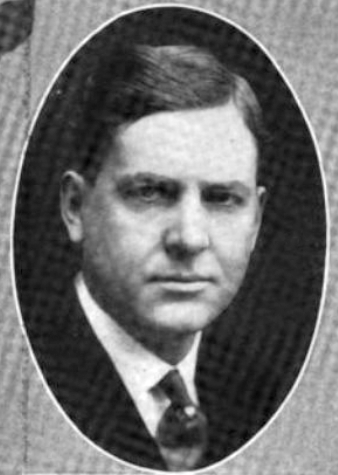

Member of the Illinois Senate
- In office 1918–1926

Personal details
- Born: Thurlow Gault Essington; May 19, 1886 Streator, Illinois
- Died: December 19, 1964 (aged 78) Streator, Illinois
- Party: Republican
- Education: University of Illinois; University of Chicago Law School
- Occupation: Lawyer, politician

Thurlow Gault Essington (May 19, 1886 – December 19, 1964) was an American lawyer and politician.

== Biography ==
Essington was born in Streator, Illinois. He went to the Streator public schools and graduated from the Streator Township High School. Essington graduated from the University of Illinois in 1906 and the University of Chicago Law School in 1908. He was admitted to the Illinois bar. He lived in Streator with his wife and family. Essington served as Streator city attorney and as mayor of Streator. Essington served in the Illinois Senate from 1919 until 1927 and was a Republican. In 1924, Essington ran for the Republican nomination for Governor of Illinois and lost the race. He died at a convalescent home in Streator, Illinois.
