= Louis Lincoln Emmerson =

Governor of Illinois from 1929 to 1933

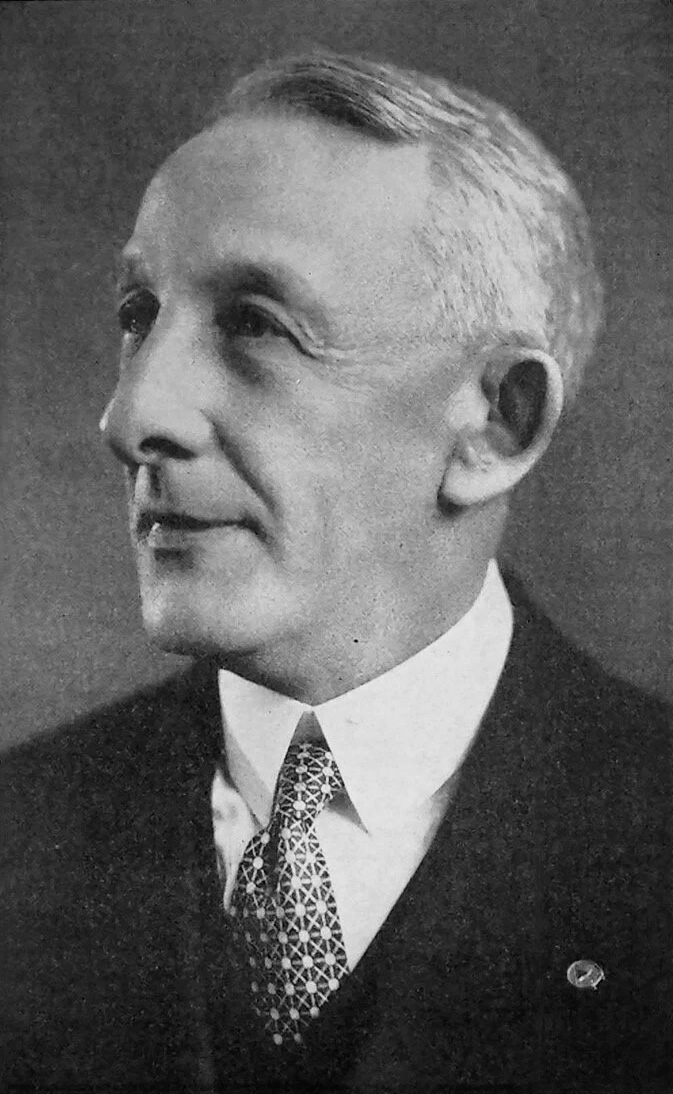
- Official portrait, c. 1929

27th Governor of Illinois
- In office January 14, 1929 – January 9, 1933
- Lieutenant: Fred E. Sterling
- Preceded by: Len Small
- Succeeded by: Henry Horner

24th Secretary of State of Illinois
- In office January 8, 1917 – January 14, 1929
- Governor: Frank O. Lowden; Lennington Small
- Preceded by: Lewis Stevenson
- Succeeded by: William J. Stratton

Personal details
- Born: Louis Lincoln Emmerson; December 27, 1863 Albion, Illinois, U.S.
- Died: February 4, 1941 (aged 77) Mount Vernon, Illinois, U.S.
- Resting place: Oakwood Cemetery; Mount Vernon, Illinois
- Party: Republican
- Spouse: Ann Mathews

Louis Lincoln Emmerson (December 27, 1863 – February 4, 1941) was an American Republican politician and the 27th governor of Illinois. He was also a prominent figure in Freemasonry in Illinois.

== Early life ==
Louis was born on December 27, 1863, in Albion, Illinois, and is the son of Jesse and Fannie Emerson. He was one of fourteen children. After completing his education in the Albion public school system, Emmerson moved to Mount Vernon, Illinois, in 1883, and established a career in the mercantile business. In 1887 Louis married his wife, Ann Mathews, who was the daughter of Thomas Matthews. He also was influential in the organization of the Mount Vernon Third National Bank, which occurred in 1901.

== Freemasonry ==
in 1891, Emmerson became a made master mason of the Mt. Vernon masonic lodge. In 1929, he was elected the Grand Master of the Grand Lodge Of Illinois. He became a Scottish Rite mason and served as the Grand High Priest of the Grand Chapter of Royal Arch Masons of Illinois and Right Eminent Grand Commander of the Grand Commandery of Knights Templar of Illinois.

== Political career ==
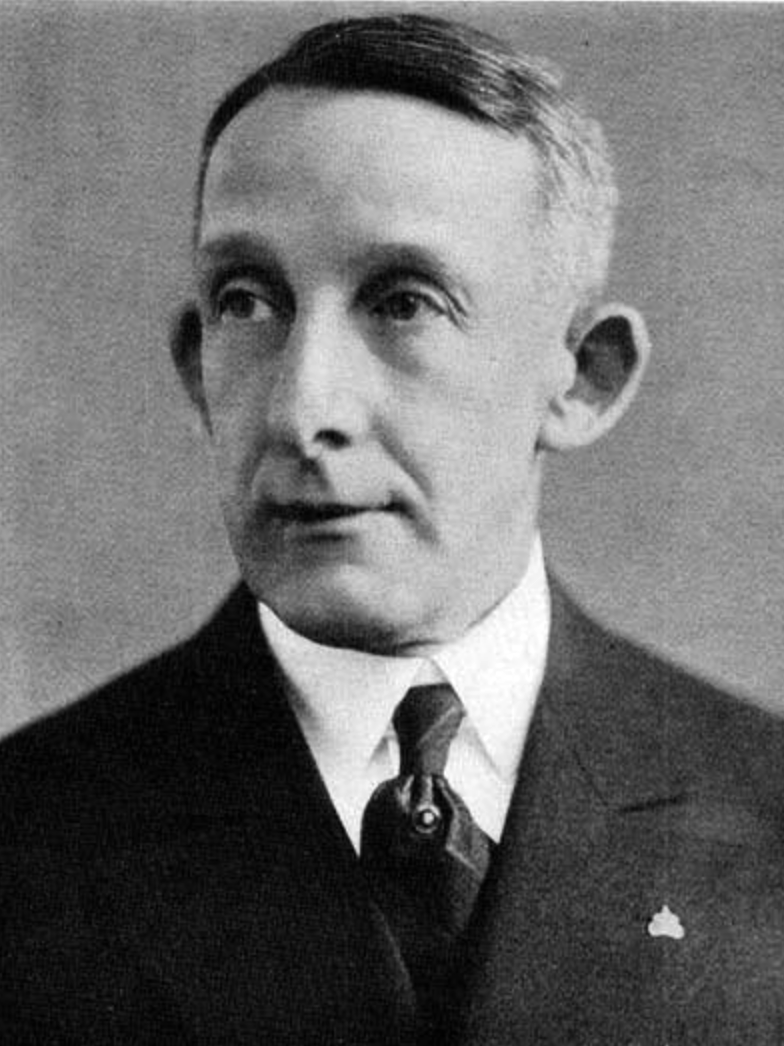
Emmerson as Secretary of State of Illinois

Emmerson entered politics in 1912, pursuing the position of state treasurer but was unsuccessful. However, four years later, he won the election for secretary of state which he held for twelve years.

=== Governor ===
Emmerson won the 1928 Republican gubernatorial nomination by a margin of 63% to 37% over the incumbent governor, the corrupt Len Small, and was sworn into the governorship on January 14, 1929. He was the oldest Illinois Governor at that time at age 65.

During his service from 1929 to 1933, at the start of the Great Depression, legislation was adopted that eased penalties on overdue taxes and allowed for the issuance of emergency bonds. Also, a motor fuel-tax was instituted and used for improvements in the highway system, the first unemployment commission was initiated, and federal grants were sanctioned for the completion of the Lakes-to-the-Gulf Waterway. Emmerson did not seek reelection and left office on January 9, 1933, retiring from politics.

== Later life ==
Governor Louis L. Emmerson died on February 4, 1941, and was buried at the Oakwood Cemetery in Mt. Vernon, Illinois.

Party political offices
Preceded by Cornelius J. Doyle	Republican nominee for Secretary of State of Illinois; 1916, 1920, 1924	Succeeded by William J. Stratton
Preceded by Len Small	Republican nominee for Governor of Illinois; 1928	Succeeded by Len Small
Political offices
Preceded by Lewis Stevenson	Illinois Secretary of State; 1917 – 1929	Succeeded by William J. Stratton
Preceded by Len Small	Governor of Illinois; 1929–1933	Succeeded by Henry Horner
