= Single Tax Party =

American political party (1910-1920s)

The Single Tax Party was a Georgist political party in the United States. It advocated for a single tax on land as a panacea for social and economic problems. In 1924, it changed its name to the Commonwealth Land Party. The party garnered little more than 5,000 votes in the 1920 United States presidential election, representing 0.02% of the total.

Georgists organized the Land Value Tax Party in 1910 as an extension of the campaign for a single tax in New York. Single-taxers attended the convention that organized the Farmer–Labor Party ahead of the 1920 United States elections; subsequently, the single-tax delegates held their own meeting on July 12, 1920, and nominated Robert C. Macauley for president and Richard C. Barnum for vice president. The ticket polled 5,353 votes in eight states, finishing last out of a field of nine candidates. The party nominated William J. Wallace in the 1924 United States presidential election but polled only 1,532 votes.

The platform adopted by the 1924 national convention called for a land value tax to replace all other methods of taxation. It attributed economic depressions, wars, poverty, and crime to "land monopoly" and predicted these problems would cease once private ownership was abolished. The party opposed income taxes and adopted a resolution attacking the incumbent Coolidge administration over the Teapot Dome scandal.

== Electoral history ==
=== Presidential tickets ===
Election	Ticket		Electoral results		
Election	Presidential nominee	Running mate	Popular vote	Electoral votes	Ranking
1920	Robert C. Macauley	Richard C. Barnum	0.02%	0 / 531	9
1924	William J. Wallace	John C. Lincoln	0.01%	0 / 531	8

== See also ==
- Tax reform
- Tax shift
- Third party (United States)

== Bibliography ==
- Petersen, Svend (1963). A Statistical History of the American Presidential Elections. New York: Frederick Ungar Publishing Company. LCCN 62-21786.
- Spooner, Walter W.; Smith, Ray B. (1922). National Political Parties with their Platforms. Syracuse, NY: Syracuse Press.
- Stanwood, Edward (1916). A History of the Presidency from 1897 to 1916. Cambridge, MA: Riverside Press.
