= Harry B. Hershey =

American judge

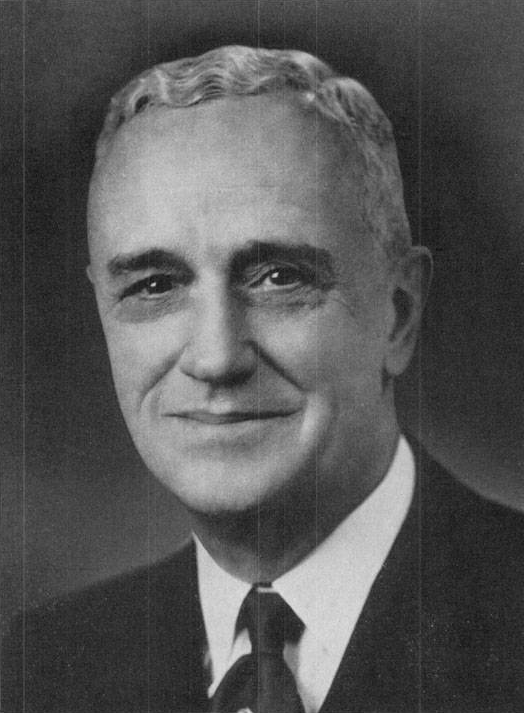
Hershey's official photograph, c. 1953.

Harry Bryant Hershey (March 8, 1885 – August 3, 1967) was an American jurist and politician.

Hershey was born March 8, 1885, in Mifflin, Ohio. His family moved to Taylorville, Illinois where Hershey was educated in Taylorville public schools. He earned his bachelor's degree in 1909 from the College of Law at the University of Illinois Urbana-Champaign and his Juris Doctor degree from the University of Chicago Law School in 1911. Hershey was admitted to the bar in 1911. The next year, he was elected City Attorney of Taylorville and shortly thereafter elected State's Attorney for Christian County. Hershey served two terms as State's Attorney from 1912 to 1920. He then served two, two-year terms as the Mayor of Taylorville from 1922 to 1926. In 1940, Hershey defeated incumbent Lieutenant Governor John Henry Stelle in the Democratic gubernatorial primary. In the general election, Republican nominee and former U.S. Attorney for Northern Illinois Dwight H. Green defeated Hershey with 52.93% of the vote to Hershey's 46.74% of the vote.

After having served as general counsel for the Bureau of Liquidation, Conservation and Rehabilitation for the Department of Insurance from 1932 to 1940, Governor Adlai Stevenson appointed Hershey the department's director in 1949. He served in this position until he joined the Illinois Supreme Court from the 2nd district. He served on the court until 1966. Hershey died in a hospital in Taylorville, Illinois.

== Notes ==
Party political offices
Preceded by Henry Horner	Democratic nominee for Governor of Illinois; 1940	Succeeded by Thomas J. Courtney
