= 1948 Illinois gubernatorial election =

- November 2, 1948
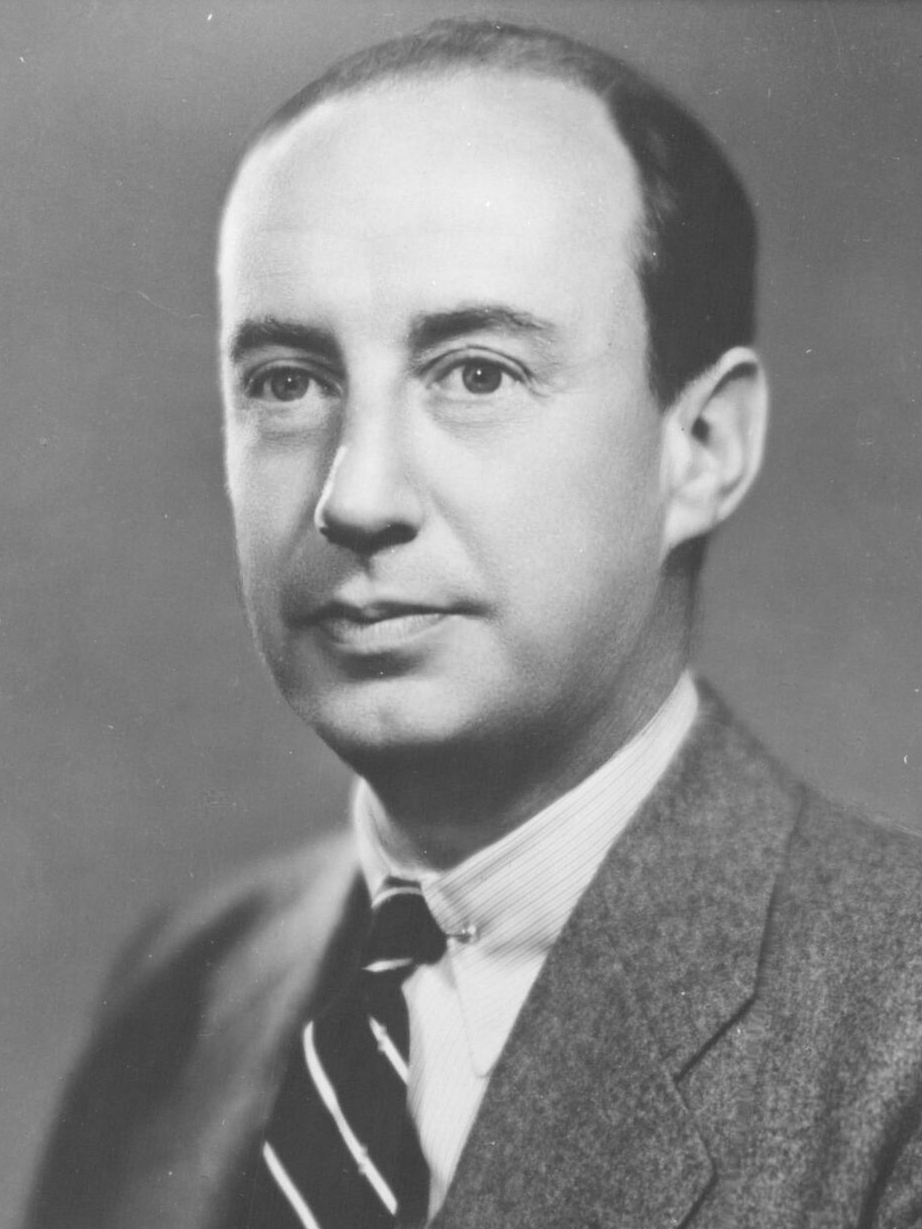

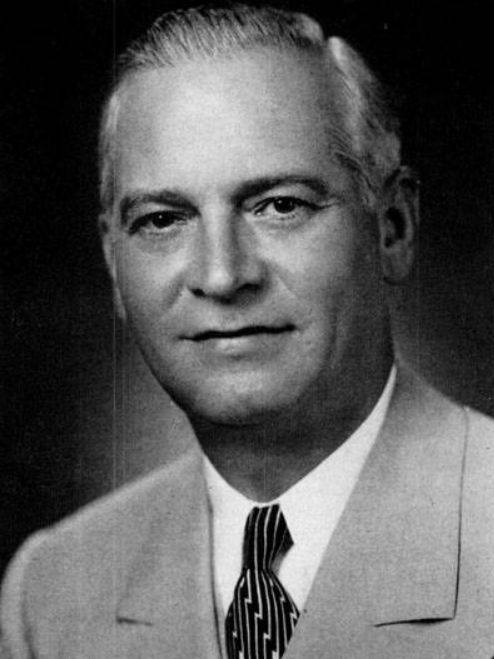
Nominee	Adlai Stevenson II	Dwight H. Green
Party	Democratic	Republican
Popular vote	2,250,074	1,678,007
Percentage	57.11%	42.59%
- County results Stevenson: 40–50% 50–60% 60–70% Green: 40–50% 50–60% 60–70%
Governor before election
Dwight H. Green
Republican
Elected Governor
Adlai Stevenson II
Democratic

The 1948 Illinois gubernatorial election took place on November 2, 1948. Incumbent Governor Dwight H. Green, a Republican seeking a third term, lost reelection to Democratic nominee Adlai Stevenson II.

The primaries and general election both coincided with those for federal offices (United States President, House, and United States Senate) and those for other state offices. The election was part of the 1948 Illinois elections.

At the time, Illinois was a predominantly Republican-leaning state. The state had only elected three Democratic governors since the American Civil War. Stevenson defeated Green in what was regarded as a surprise upset. His margin of victory of 572,067 votes was, at the time, record-breaking for an Illinois gubernatorial election.

Stevenson's strong performance in the gubernatorial election and Democratic nominee Paul Douglas' strong performance in the 1948 United States Senate election in Illinois were regarded as having helped the Democratic ticket of Harry S. Truman and Alben W. Barkley secure their narrow victory in Illinois in the 1948 United States presidential election.

== Democratic primary ==
=== Campaign ===
Adlai Stevenson II was chosen by Jacob Arvey, leader of the powerful Cook County Democratic Party organization, to the Democratic candidate in the Illinois gubernatorial race against the incumbent Republican governor, Dwight H. Green. While Stevenson had a preference for a role that would see him involved in national politics, such as being a United States senator, the path for him to run for senate would have been difficult, while Arvey was offering him a clear path to be elected governor.

Stevenson launched his campaign with a speech to the McLean County Democrats Jackson Day dinner in his hometown of Bloomington on February 23, 1948. He made clear that, rather than seeking out the office himself, he had been drafted by the Democratic State Central Committee, who had asked him to be their gubernatorial candidate due to his "record in private life," and, "public service in the war and the peace," and their confidence he would win and, that as governor would be, "a credit," to the Democratic party. Stevenson, in launching his campaign, pledged to clean up Illinois politics, which had been plagued by corruption and scandal. Part of his appeal as a candidate in the year 1948 was that he lacked ties to the state's "politics as usual".

Stevenson ultimately faced no opponents on the ballot in the primary.

=== Results ===
Gubernatorial Democratic primary
Party	Candidate	Votes	%
Democratic	Adlai E. Stevenson	578,390	100
Total votes		578,390	100

== Republican primary ==
Incumbent governor Dwight H. Green ultimately faced no opponents on the ballot.

Gubernatorial Republican primary
Party	Candidate	Votes	%
Republican	Dwight H. Green (incumbent)	744,348	100
Write-in		12	0.00
Total votes		744,360	100

== General election ==
With little fodder to attack Stevenson with, Green instead sought to tie him to the national Democratic Party, headed by president Harry S. Truman, and to national scandals, as well as the large spending New Deal programs. He also sought to paint Stevenson as weak toward communism.

Stevenson had plenty of fodder to attack Green and Green's policies. Green had failed to live up to his original gubernatorial campaign promise to run an "anticorruption administration". Green's administration had faced allegations of ties to gangsters like the Shelton Brothers Gang. The 1947 Centralia mine disaster also greatly harmed the image of Green's gubernatorial administration, as state mine inspectors had received payoffs from coal companies to ignore violations during safety inspections.

Stevenson made use of his oratory skill, delivering harsh one-liners against Green.

=== Result ===
Gubernatorial election
Party	Candidate	Votes	%
Democratic	Adlai E. Stevenson	2,250,074	57.11
Republican	Dwight H. Green (incumbent)	1,678,007	42.59
Prohibition	Willis Ray Wilson	9,491	0.24
Socialist Labor	Louis Fisher	2,673	0.07
Write-in		12	0.00
Total votes		3,940,257	100
