= Thomas J. Courtney =

American politician and attorney (1892-1971)

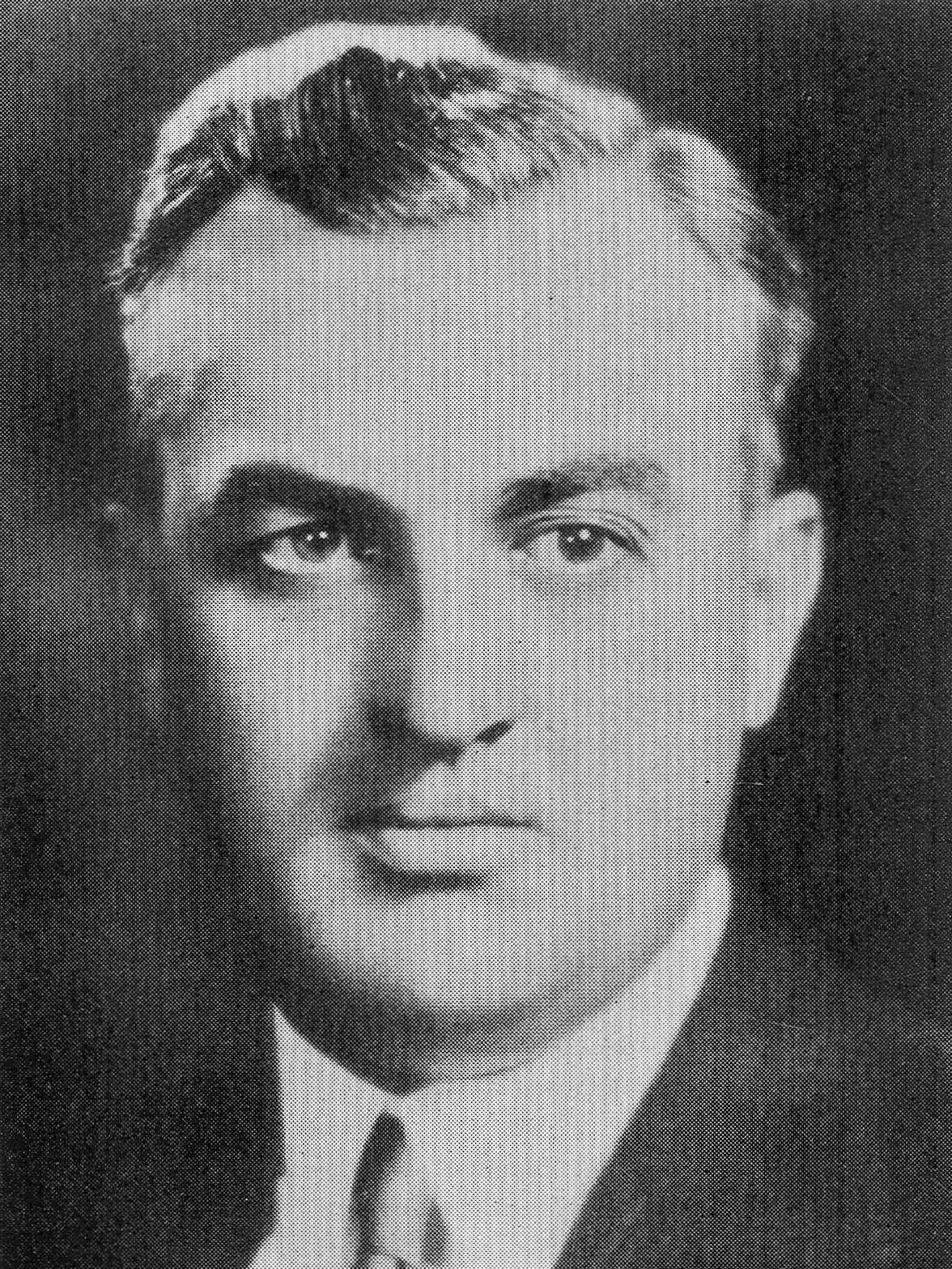
- Courtney in the 1930s

Judge of the Circuit Court of Cook County
- In office 1945–1970

Cook County State's Attorney
- In office 1932–1944
- Preceded by: John A. Swanson
- Succeeded by: William J. Tuohy

Illinois State Senator from the 11th District
- In office 1927–1933

Personal details
- Born: December 23, 1892 Chicago, Illinois, U.S.
- Died: December 3, 1971 (aged 78) Chicago, Illinois, U.S.
- Party: Democratic
- Spouse: Kathryn Foley
- Parent(s): James R. Courtney and Catherine (Hussey) Courtney
- Occupation: Attorney, judge, politician
- Known for: Cook County State's Attorney, Illinois gubernatorial candidate, longtime Circuit Court judge

Thomas J. Courtney (December 23, 1892 – December 3, 1971) was an influential Illinois Democratic politician and attorney for roughly 50 years in the mid-20th Century.

Courtney was born in Chicago, Illinois to James R. Courtney and Catherine (Hussey) Courtney. In 1917 he married Kathryn Foley. In 1927 he was elected to the Illinois State Senate from the 11th District, serving one term of six years.

In his last year in the legislature, Courtney ran successfully for Cook County State's Attorney, and for the next dozen years held that office. During his tenure, Courtney frequently made local and even national news for such actions as the "railroaded" prosecution of mobster Roger Touhy for the fake kidnapping of Jake "The Barber" Factor; investigating a CTA "L" crash where 20 persons died, raiding betting parlors, and raiding slot machines. Numerous raids in 1938 netted headlines but no convictions and are viewed by historians as political show.

While State's Attorney Courtney was twice a delegate to the Democratic National Convention.

In the late 1930s, Courtney tried to ally himself with Governor Henry Horner in the latter's political feud with Chicago mayor Edward Joseph Kelly and Democratic boss Patrick A. Nash, going so far as to challenge Kelly in the 1939 mayoral primary. Horner, however, had reconciled with the Democratic bosses, and without Horner's support, Courtney was beaten by a 2:1 margin.

In 1944, Courtney was the Democratic nominee for governor of Illinois, losing in the general election to Republican incumbent Dwight H. Green. The next year, 1945, he became a judge of the Circuit Court of Cook County and served on the bench for the next quarter-century, until 1970. He died the year after he left the bench, in 1971, in Chicago. Courtney was a Catholic and a member of the Knights of Columbus.

Party political offices
Preceded by Thomas Donovan	Democratic nominee for Attorney General of Illinois; 1928	Succeeded by Otto Kerner Sr.
Preceded by Harry B. Hershey	Democratic nominee for Governor of Illinois; 1944	Succeeded by Adlai Stevenson II
