= 1940 Illinois gubernatorial election =

- November 5, 1940
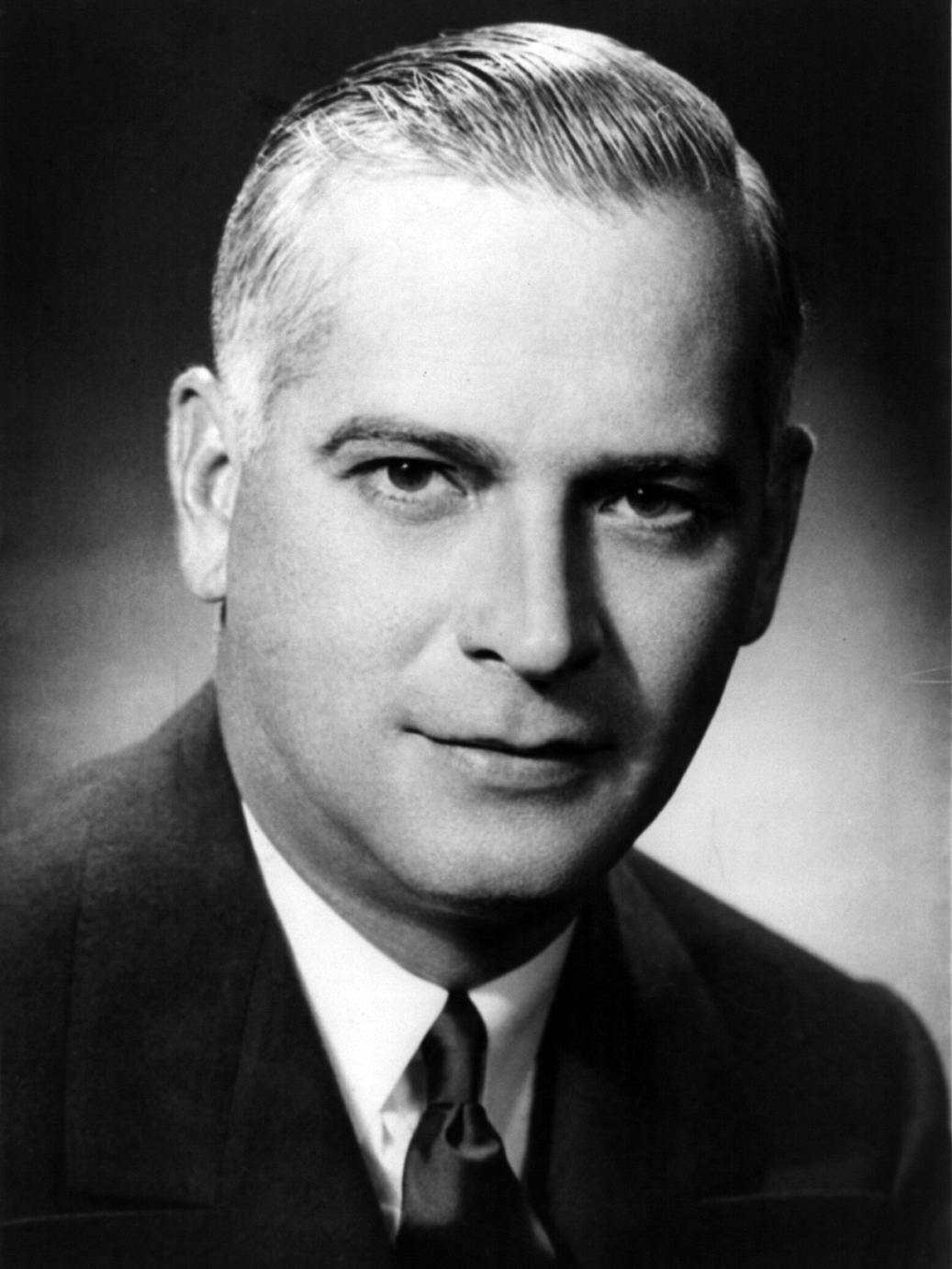

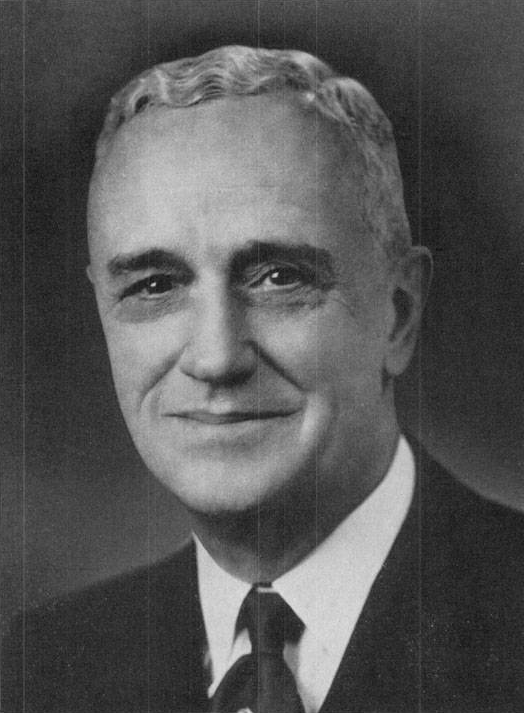
Nominee	Dwight H. Green	Harry B. Hershey
Party	Republican	Democratic
Popular vote	2,197,778	1,940,833
Percentage	52.93%	46.74%
- County results Green: 40–50% 50–60% 60–70% 70–80% Hershey: 50–60% 60–70%
Governor before election
John Henry Stelle (Note: Lieutenant Governor Stelle assumed office as Governor after the death of Governor Henry Horner in October 1940, less than a month before the election. Stelle had lost the Democratic primary for Governor earlier that year.)
Democratic
Elected Governor
Dwight H. Green
Republican

The 1940 Illinois gubernatorial election was held on November 5, 1940.

Before the primary, incumbent governor Henry Horner, a Democrat, opted not to seek a third term. In October, before the general election, his death in office made John Henry Stelle assume the governorship. However, Stelle had previously failed to win the Democratic nomination in the primary.

Republican former Attorney Dwight H. Green won the election, defeating his Democratic opponent, former Mayor of Taylorville Harry B. Hershey, with 52.93% of the vote.

== Democratic primary ==
=== Candidates ===
- Harry B. Hershey, former mayor of Taylorville
- Albert Lagerstedt, former member of the Minnesota House of Representatives and unsuccessful candidate for Democratic nomination in 1938 United States Senate election in Illinois
- Robert W. McKinlay
- James O. Monroe
- John H. Stelle, incumbent lieutenant governor of Illinois

=== Results ===
Gubernatorial Democratic primary
Party	Candidate	Votes	%
Democratic	Harry B. Hershey	815,604	59.73
Democratic	John H. Stelle	484,454	35.48
Democratic	Robert W. McKinlay	27,593	2.02
Democratic	James O. Monroe	24,862	1.82
Democratic	Albert Lagerstedt	12,925	0.95
Write-in		2	0.00
Total votes		1,365,440	100

== Republican primary ==
=== Candidates ===
- Dwight H. Green, Republican nominee for mayor of Chicago in 1939
- Richard J. Lyons, former Illinois state representative

Gubernatorial Republican primary
Party	Candidate	Votes	%
Republican	Dwight H. Green	610,025	57.14
Republican	Richard J. Lyons	457,643	42.86
Total votes		1,067,668	100

== General election ==
Gubernatorial election
Party	Candidate	Votes	%
Republican	Dwight H. Green	2,197,778	52.93
Democratic	Harry B. Hershey	1,940,833	46.74
Socialist Labor	Arthur G. McDowell	7,523	0.18
Prohibition	Clay Freeman Gaumer	6,467	0.16
Total votes		4,152,622	100
