= 1939 Chicago mayoral election =

- April 5, 1939
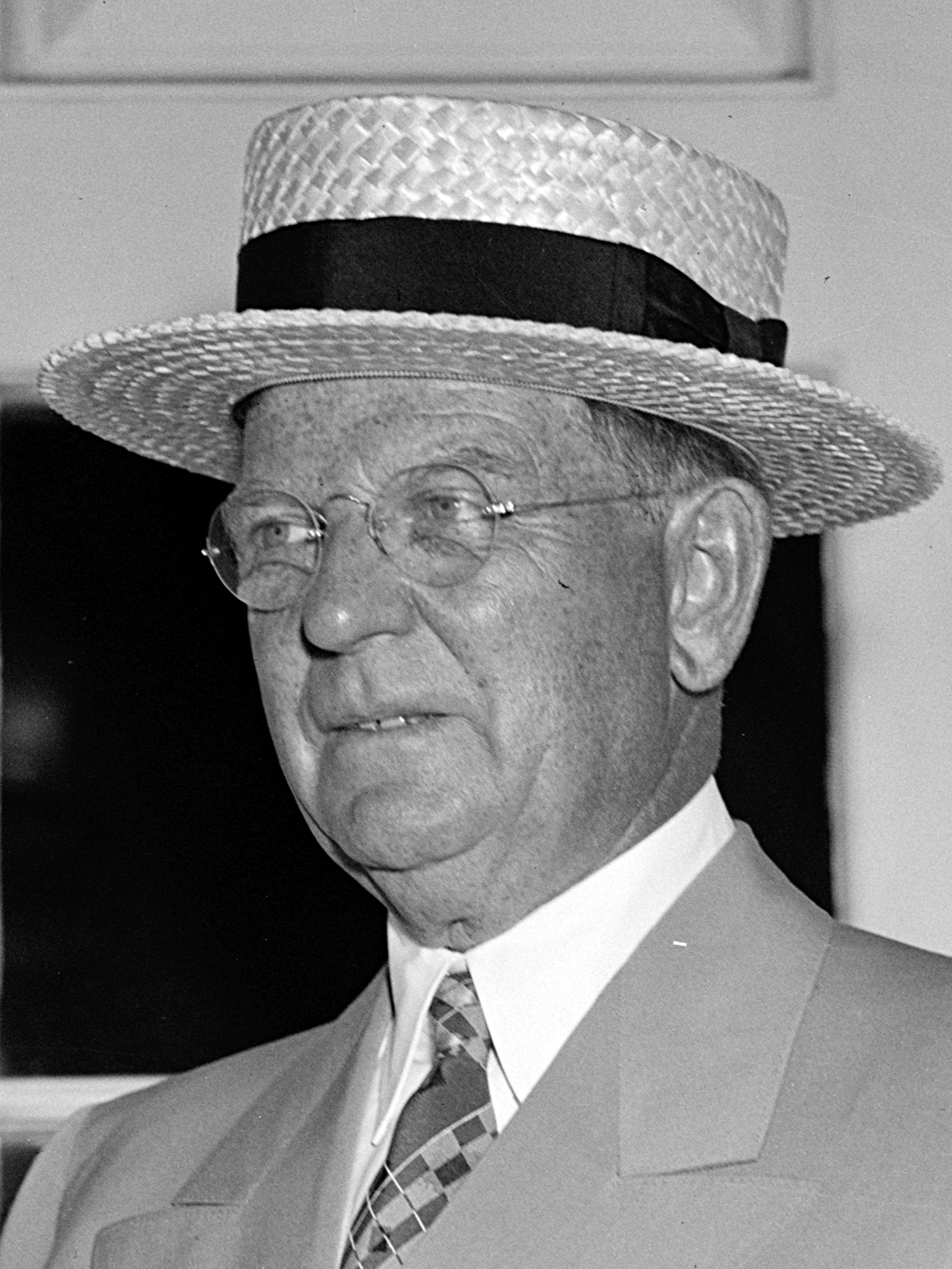

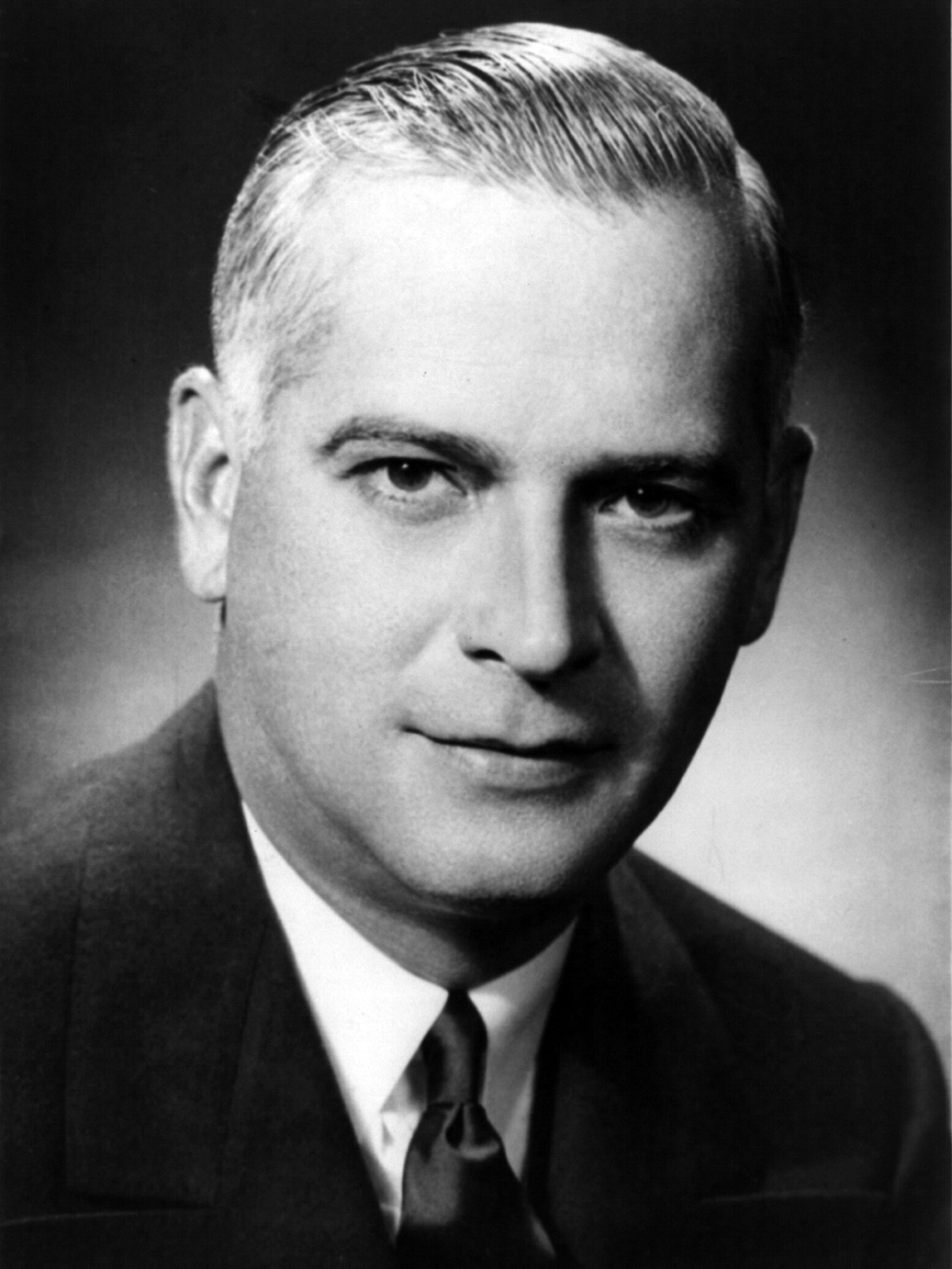
Nominee	Edward J. Kelly	Dwight H. Green
Party	Democratic	Republican
Popular vote	822,469	638,068
Percentage	56.12%	43.54%
Mayor before election
Edward J. Kelly
Democratic
Elected mayor
Edward J. Kelly
Democratic

The Chicago mayoral election of 1939 was held on April 5, 1939. The election saw incumbent Edward J. Kelly being reelected to a second full term (third overall term), defeating Dwight H. Green by a double-digit margin.

Both major parties held primary elections to determine their nominees. The primaries were held on February 28, 1939. Kelly won renomination in the Democratic Party primary against Thomas J. Courtney, the Cook County state's attorney. In his candidacy, Courtney had sought to challenge the city's Democratic political machine. In the Republican Party primary, Green won a massive victory over former mayor William Hale Thompson.

Green would be elected Governor of Illinois one year later.

== Nominations ==
=== Democratic primary ===
Incumbent Democrat Edward J. Kelly had already served for nearly six years, which meant that he was going to tie the record at the time for the most consecutive years spent as mayor (Carter Harrison Jr. had also spent six consecutive years between 1899 and 1905). By seeking election an additional four-year term, Kelly was running to have the longest uninterrupted mayoralty Chicago had ever seen. An additional four years would also tie him with Carter Harrison Jr. for the longest-serving mayor in Chicago history at the time (Harrison had served ten non-consecutive years as mayor).

Poster from Courtney's campaign

Kelly fended off a primary challenge from Thomas J. Courtney. Rebellious and reform-oriented Democrats united behind Thomas J. Courtney as a challenger to Kelly and the political machine. Courtney had initially held hopes of aligning himself with Governor Henry Horner. Horner had been engaging in a political feud with Kelly and Chicago Democratic boss Patrick Nash. However, Horner made peace with Chicago's Democratic machine before the mayoral primary, consequentially robbing Courntney of an opportunity to capitalize off of discord between the Chicago political establishment and the state's governor. Despite efforts to draft him, Harold L. Ickes did not run for the nomination.

==== Results ====
Chicago Democratic mayoral primary (February 28, 1939)
Party	Candidate	Votes	%
Democratic	Edward J. Kelly (incumbent)	604,000	62.78
Democratic	Thomas J. Courtney	358,139	37.22
Turnout		962,139	

=== Republican primary ===
Dwight H. Green defeated former mayor William Hale Thompson in the Republican primary. Thompson had announced his bid in mid-December 1938. This is regarded to have been the last time that two big-name individuals faced one another in a Republican Chicago mayoral primary.

==== Results ====
Chicago Republican mayoral primary (February 28, 1939)
Party	Candidate	Votes	%
Republican	Dwight H. Green	211,965	77.27
Republican	William H. Thompson	62,352	22.73
Turnout		274,317	

=== Independent candidacy of Arthur P. Reilly ===
Republican Arthur P. Reilly ran as an independent.

== General election ==
Republican nominee Dwight H. Green was strong opponent to the incumbent Kelly. Green was a young and talented lawyer, as well as a political reformer. As an assistant district attorney, Green had helped to construct the income tax evasion case which led to mobster Al Capone's imprisonment. Green ran a vigorous campaign which attempted to make the case against Kelly's political campaign for its connections with criminal elements. His campaign also harshly criticized increases in the city tax rate. Green's campaign, in a sense, was a four-month series of attacks on the Kelly-Patrick Nash political machine. Kelly did not respond to Green's criticisms. In fact, for the duration of his campaign, Kelly did not even utter his Republican opponent's name. After his defeat in the primary, Thomas Courtney reluctantly agreed to endorse Kelly.

Kelly received the backing of trade unions. By 1939, a significant number of Chicago's African American voters had migrated their support from the Republican Party to the Democratic Party. Kelly would receive at least half the African American vote. Additionally, many of those who supported or benefited from the New Deal policies of Democratic president Franklin Roosevelt supported Kelly's reelection. On the eve of the election, Kelly received a further boost when former United States District Attorney George E. Q. Johnson declared in a radio address that he considered Chicago to no longer be a capital of crime, arguing that the city now led the nation in crime prevention, largely crediting Kelly and the city's police commissioner for this.

=== Results ===
Kelly won the election by a decisive margin and with a record-setting vote total. The overall vote total in the election was record-setting as well.

Mayor of Chicago 1939 election (General Election)
Party	Candidate	Votes	%
Democratic	Edward J. Kelly (incumbent)	822,469	56.12
Republican	Dwight H. Green	638,068	43.54
Independent	Arthur P. Reilly	4,921	0.34
Turnout		1,465,458	

== Aftermath ==
Both parties attempted to spin the narrative of the election result to their advantage. Democratic National Committee chairman James Farley declared that "As Illinois goes, so will the nation 1940." However Republicans tried to argue that Green's performance, the best by a Republican Chicago mayoral candidate in a decade, demonstrated that there was promise for Republicans to carry Illinois' 29 electoral votes in 1940. Green would go on to be elected Governor of Illinois the following year.
