= Dwight H. Green =

Governor of Illinois from 1941 to 1949

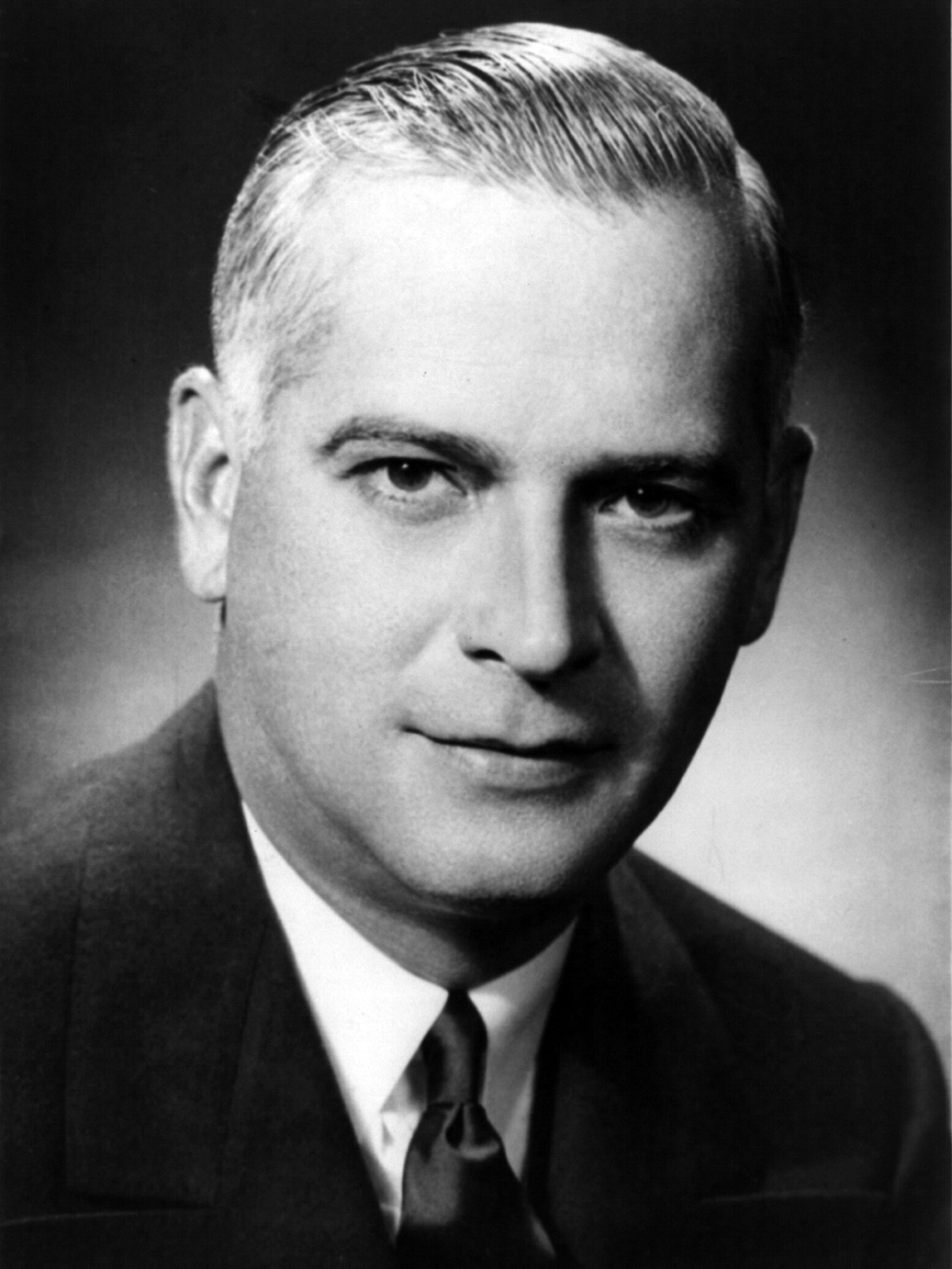
- Official portrait c. 1940

30th Governor of Illinois
- In office January 13, 1941 – January 10, 1949
- Lieutenant: Hugh W. Cross
- Preceded by: John Henry Stelle
- Succeeded by: Adlai Stevenson II

United States Attorney for the Northern District of Illinois
- In office 1931–1935
- Preceded by: George E. Q. Johnson
- Succeeded by: Michael L. Igoe

Personal details
- Born: Dwight Herbert Green; January 9, 1897 Ligonier, Indiana, U.S
- Died: February 20, 1958 (aged 61) Chicago, Illinois, U.S
- Resting place: Rosehill Cemetery
- Party: Republican
- Spouse: Mabel Kingston (1926–1958)
- Education: Wabash College (BA); University of Chicago (JD)
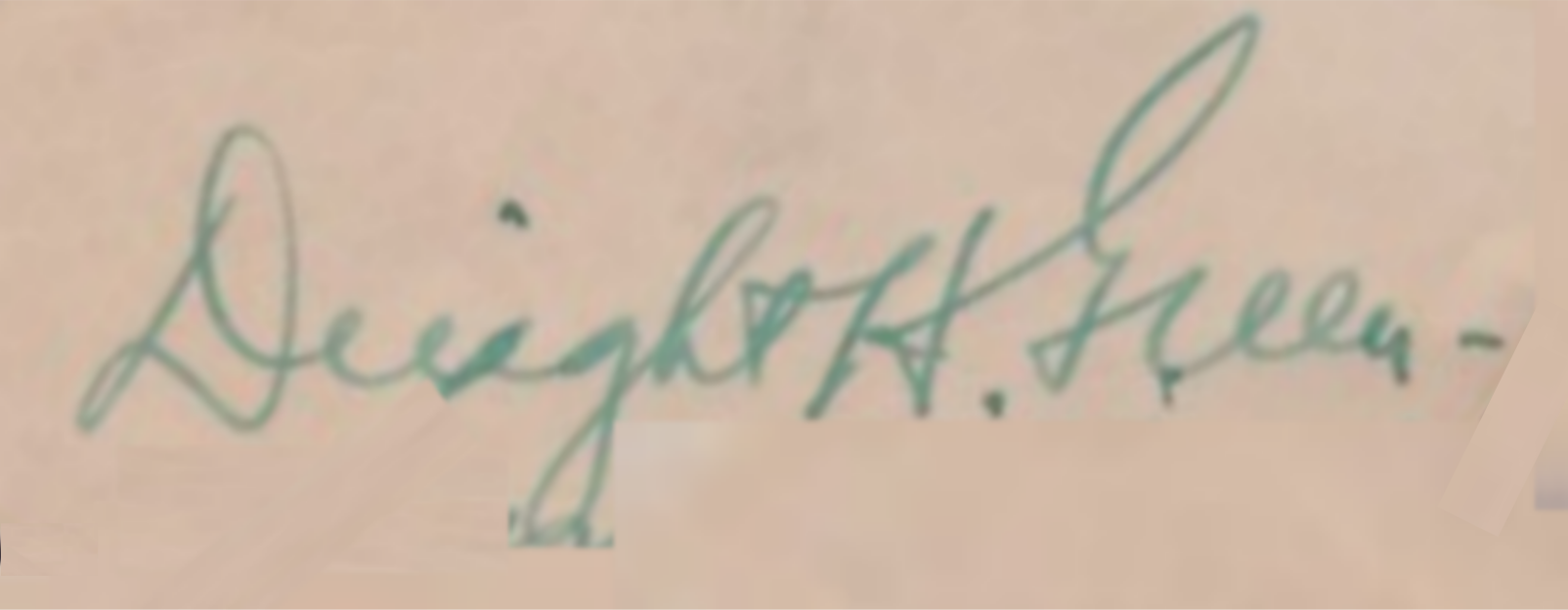
- Signature

Military service
- Allegiance: United States
- Branch/service: United States Army
- Battles/wars: World War I

Dwight Herbert Green (January 9, 1897 – February 20, 1958) was an American politician who served as the 30th governor of the US state of Illinois, serving from 1941 to 1949. Green was a Republican. Prior to being elected governor, he served as United States attorney for the Northern District of Illinois (1931–1935), and ran unsuccessfully as his party's nominee in the 1939 Chicago mayoral election.

== Earily life and career ==
Green was born in Ligonier, Noble County, Indiana, son of Harry Green and Minnie (Gerber) Green. On June 29, 1926, he married Mabel Victoria Kingston. He served in the U.S. Army during World War I. Dwight and Mabel's children were Gloria and Nancy—they attended Springfield High School in LaPorte County. Nancy married Dr. James Gilbert and they had two daughters, Susie and Gloria. Gloria married Dr. Warren McPherson and they had two children, Scott and Victoria. Nancy Green Gilbert died in 2019. Gloria Green McPherson died in 1985.

Green attended Wabash College in Crawfordsville, Indiana, where he was a member of the Alpha-Pi chapter of Kappa Sigma fraternity. He attended law school at the University of Chicago, practiced law, and served as United States Attorney for the Northern District of Illinois in 1931–35. It would be Green's primary responsibility to help fight the organized crime operations—such as Al Capone's gang—which virtually ruled Chicago and much of the state in the 1930s. The government team prosecuting Al Capone for Tax Evasion consisted of U.S. Attorney George E. Q. Johnson, and his prosecutors Dwight H. Green, Samuel Clawson, Jacob Grossman and William Froelich.

In 1939, Green was the unsuccessful Republican candidate for mayor of Chicago. He defeated former mayor William Hale Thompson by a broad margin in the Republican primary, but lost the general election to incumbent mayor Edward Joseph Kelly (a Democrat).

== Governor of Illinois ==
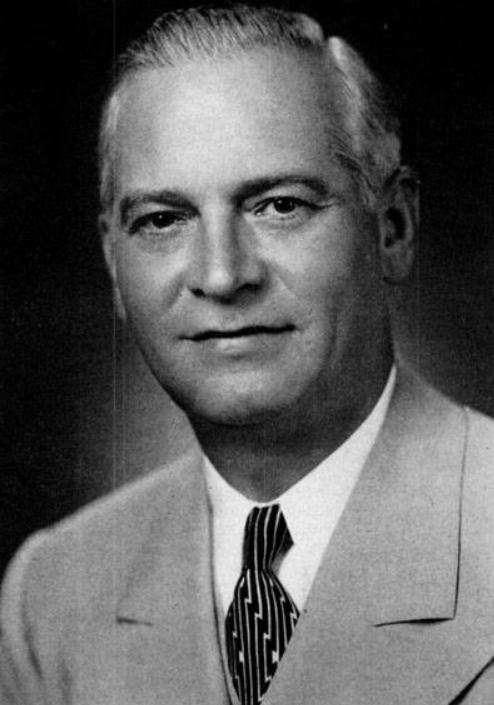
Green during his last term as governor.

In 1940, a backlash against the New Deal and the U.S. Democratic Party had begun to affect Illinois and many other states, especially in the Midwest. The Republican Green, with his record as a prosecutor and established opposition to the big-city Chicago political machine, was elected governor of Illinois in the 1940 Illinois gubernatorial election. He was inaugurated on January 13, 1941.

At the end of the same year, Pearl Harbor thrust Governor Green into the job of leading one of the largest U.S. state governments during World War II. He won widespread support during the war and was reelected in 1944 to serve a second full term.

The coming of peace in 1945 created new challenges for America's big cities and state governments. In particular, there was a sharp shortage of housing for returning veterans and their families, as little had been built during the war or the Great Depression.

The Chicago Democratic party slated an intellectual lawyer, Adlai Stevenson, to oppose Green for a third term in office. In a surprising upset, Stevenson defeated Green in November 1948, ending Green's political career; the defeat was in part owing to his negligence in preventing the deaths of 111 miners in the Centralia mine disaster. Though the disaster was likely accidental, the buildup to the mine explosion was due to the governmental regulators following a "weak, ineffectual, and indifferent policy toward enforcement of state mining laws".

== Later years ==
Governor Green returned to private life after his 1948 defeat. He died February 20, 1958, and was buried at Rosehill Cemetery in Chicago.

Legal offices
Preceded by George E. Q. Johnson	United States Attorney for the Northern District of Illinois; 1931–1935	Succeeded by Michael L. Igoe
Party political offices
Preceded by Emil C. Wetten	Republican nominee for Mayor of Chicago; 1939	Succeeded by George B. McKibbin
Preceded by Charles W. Brooks	Republican nominee for Governor of Illinois; 1940, 1944, 1948	Succeeded by William Stratton
Preceded by Earl Warren	Keynote Speaker of the Republican National Convention; 1948	Succeeded by Douglas MacArthur
Political offices
Preceded by John H. Stelle	Governor of Illinois; 1941–1949	Succeeded by Adlai Stevenson II
