= Adlai Stevenson II =

American politician and diplomat (1900–1965)

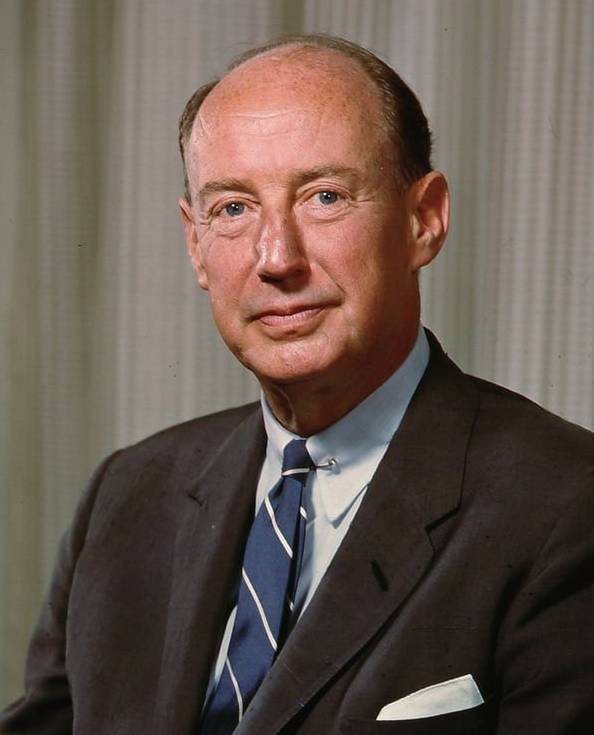
- Official portrait, 1961

5th United States Ambassador to the United Nations
- In office January 23, 1961 – July 14, 1965
- President: John F. Kennedy; Lyndon B. Johnson
- Preceded by: James Jeremiah Wadsworth
- Succeeded by: Arthur Goldberg

31st Governor of Illinois
- In office January 10, 1949 – January 12, 1953
- Lieutenant: Sherwood Dixon
- Preceded by: Dwight H. Green
- Succeeded by: William Stratton

Personal details
- Born: Adlai Ewing Stevenson II; February 5, 1900 Los Angeles, California, U.S.
- Died: July 14, 1965 (aged 65) London, England
- Resting place: Evergreen Cemetery
- Party: Democratic
- Spouse: Ellen Borden (m. 1928; div. 1949)
- Children: 3, including Adlai III
- Parent: Lewis Stevenson (father)
- Relatives: Stevenson family
- Education: Princeton University (BA); Northwestern University (JD)

Military service
- Branch/service: United States Navy
- Years of service: 1918–1919
- Rank: Seaman second class
- Unit: Princeton Naval Unit
- Wars: World War I

Adlai Ewing Stevenson II (/ˈædleɪ/; February 5, 1900 – July 14, 1965) was an American politician and diplomat who was the United States ambassador to the United Nations from 1961 until his death in 1965. He served as the 31st governor of Illinois from 1949 to 1953 and was the Democratic Party nominee for president of the United States in 1952 and 1956, losing both elections to Dwight D. Eisenhower.

Stevenson was the grandson of Adlai Stevenson, the 23rd vice president of the United States. He was raised in Bloomington, Illinois. After a short stint in the U.S. Navy at the end of World War I, he became a lawyer. He served in many positions in the federal government during the Franklin D. Roosevelt and Harry S. Truman presidential administrations, including in the Department of the Navy, and the State Department during World War II. In 1945, he served on the committee that created the United Nations, and was a member of the initial U.S. delegations to the UN.

In 1948, Stevenson was elected governor of Illinois, defeating incumbent governor Dwight H. Green in an upset. As governor, Stevenson reformed the state police, cracked down on illegal gambling, improved the state highways, and attempted to cleanse the state government of corruption. Stevenson also sought, with mixed success, to reform the Illinois state constitution and introduced several crime bills in the state legislature.

In 1952 and 1956, Stevenson was chosen as the Democratic nominee for president but was defeated in a landslide by Eisenhower both times, campaigning on themes of diplomatic engagement, moderate economic management, and the preservation of civil liberties amid the tensions of the early Cold War. In 1960, he unsuccessfully sought the Democratic presidential nomination for a third time at the Democratic National Convention. After President John F. Kennedy was elected, persistent tensions – particularly Kennedy's perception that Stevenson had been late to endorse his candidacy – prompted Kennedy to decline offering him a cabinet position and instead appoint him as the United States ambassador to the United Nations (UN). Two major events Stevenson dealt with during his time as UN ambassador were the Bay of Pigs Invasion of Cuba in April 1961 and the Cuban Missile Crisis in October 1962. He was still serving as UN ambassador through the Lyndon Johnson administration when he suffered a heart attack during a visit to London on July 14, 1965, dying later that day at the age of 65. He is buried in Evergreen Cemetery in his hometown of Bloomington, Illinois.

== Early life and education ==
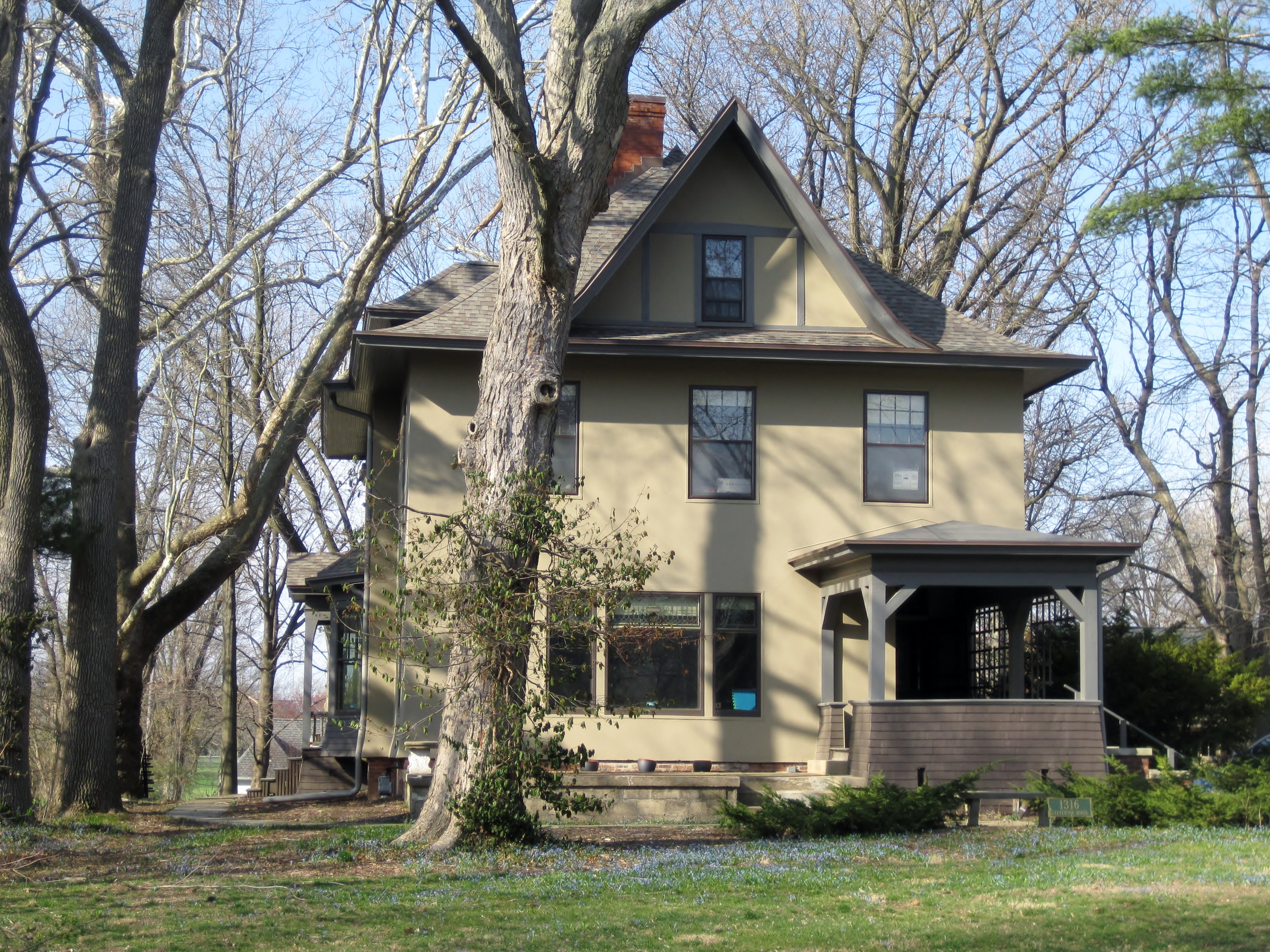
Stevenson's childhood home in Bloomington, Illinois

Adlai Ewing Stevenson II was born in Los Angeles, California, in a neighborhood that is now designated as the North University Park Historic District. His home and birthplace at 2639 Monmouth Avenue has been designated as a Los Angeles Historic-Cultural Monument. Part of a prominent Illinois political family, his grandfather and namesake Adlai Stevenson was Vice President of the United States under President Grover Cleveland from 1893 to 1897. His father, Lewis Stevenson, never held an elected office, but was appointed Illinois Secretary of State (1914–1917) and was considered a strong contender for the Democratic vice-presidential nomination in 1928. A maternal great-grandfather, Jesse W. Fell, had been a close friend and campaign manager for Abraham Lincoln in his 1858 US Senate race; Stevenson often referred to Fell as his favorite ancestor. Stevenson's eldest son, Adlai E. Stevenson III, became a U.S. Senator from Illinois (1970–1981). His mother was Helen Davis Stevenson, and he had an older sister, Elizabeth Stevenson Ives, an author who was called "Buffie". Actor McLean Stevenson was a second cousin once removed. He was the nephew by marriage of novelist Mary Borden, and she assisted in the writing of some of his political speeches.

Stevenson was raised in the city of Bloomington, Illinois, and his family was a member of Bloomington's upper class and lived in one of the city's well-to-do neighborhoods. On December 30, 1912, at the age of twelve, Stevenson accidentally killed Ruth Merwin, a 16-year-old friend, while demonstrating drill technique with a rifle, inadvertently left loaded, during a party at the Stevenson home. Stevenson was devastated by the accident and rarely mentioned or discussed it as an adult, even with his wife and children. However, in 1955 Stevenson heard about a woman whose son had experienced a similar tragedy. He wrote to her that she should tell her son that "he must now live for two", which Stevenson's friends took to be a reference to the shooting incident.

Stevenson left Bloomington High School after his junior year and attended University High School in Normal, Illinois, Bloomington's "twin city", just to the north. He then went to boarding school in Connecticut at The Choate School (now Choate Rosemary Hall), where he played on the tennis team, acted in plays, and was elected editor-in-chief of The Choate News, the school newspaper. Upon his graduation from Choate in 1918, he enlisted in the United States Naval Reserve for World War I. He served as a seaman apprentice while undergoing training but the Armistice of November 11, 1918 ended the war while he was still in training, and he was discharged as a seaman second class in January 1919.

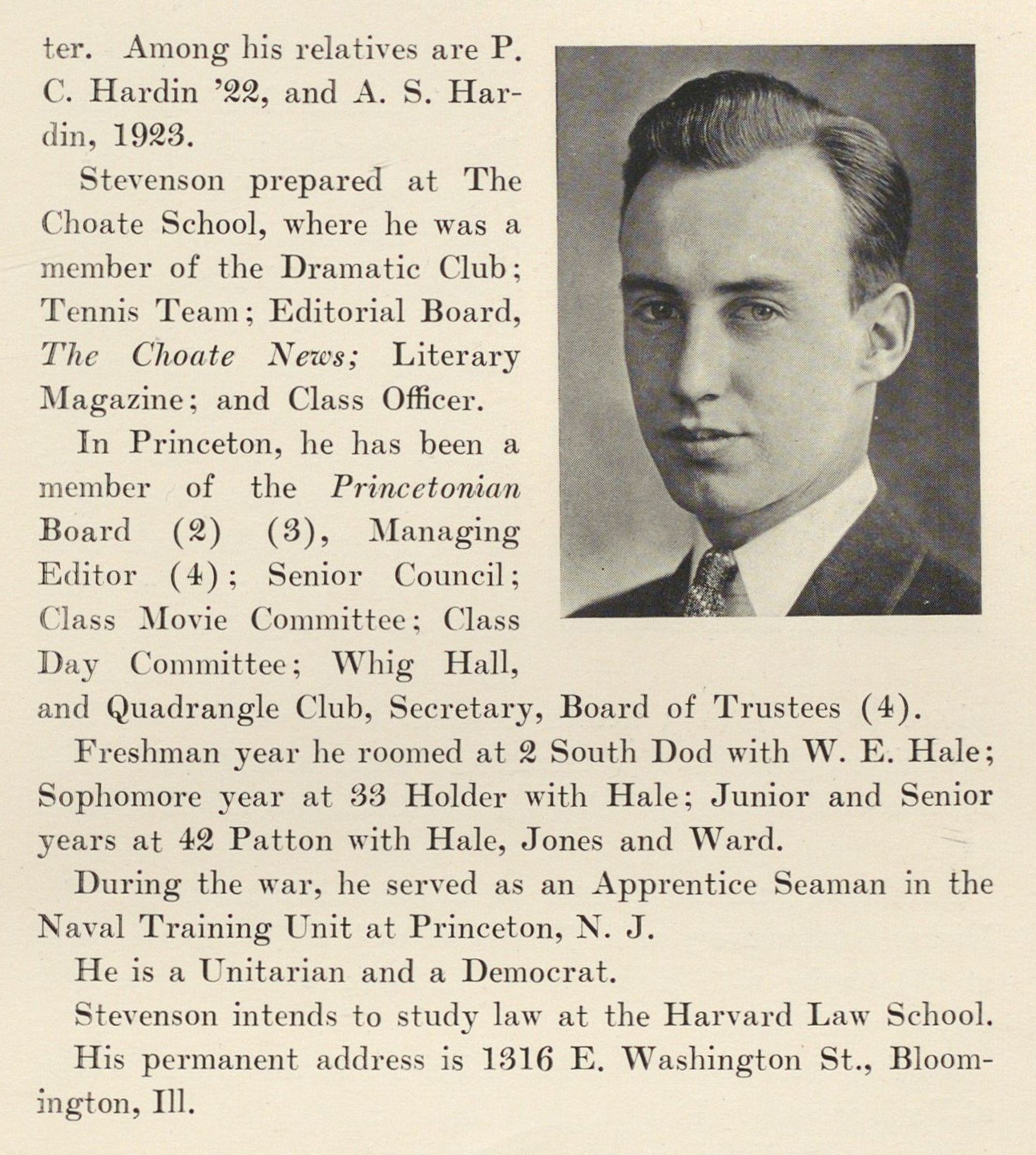
Stevenson in the Princeton University yearbook, 1922

He attended Princeton University, becoming managing editor of The Daily Princetonian, a member of the American Whig-Cliosophic Society, a member of the Quadrangle Club, and received a B.A. degree in 1922 in literature and history. Under prodding from his father, he then went to Harvard Law School, but found law to be "uninteresting", and withdrew after failing several classes. He returned to Bloomington where he wrote for the family newspaper, The Daily Pantagraph, which was founded by his maternal great-grandfather Jesse Fell. The Pantagraph, which had one of the largest circulations of any newspaper in Illinois outside the Chicago area, was a main source of the Stevenson family's wealth. Following his mother's death in 1935, Adlai inherited one-quarter of the Pantagraph's stock, providing him with a large, dependable source of income for the rest of his life.

A year after leaving Harvard, Stevenson became interested in the law again after talking to Supreme Court Justice Oliver Wendell Holmes Jr. When he returned home to Bloomington, he decided to finish his degree at Northwestern University School of Law, attending classes during the week and returning to Bloomington on the weekends to write for the Pantagraph. Stevenson received his J.D. degree from Northwestern in 1926 and passed the Illinois state bar examination the same year. He obtained a position at Cutting, Moore & Sidley, one of Chicago's oldest and most prestigious law firms.

=== Family ===
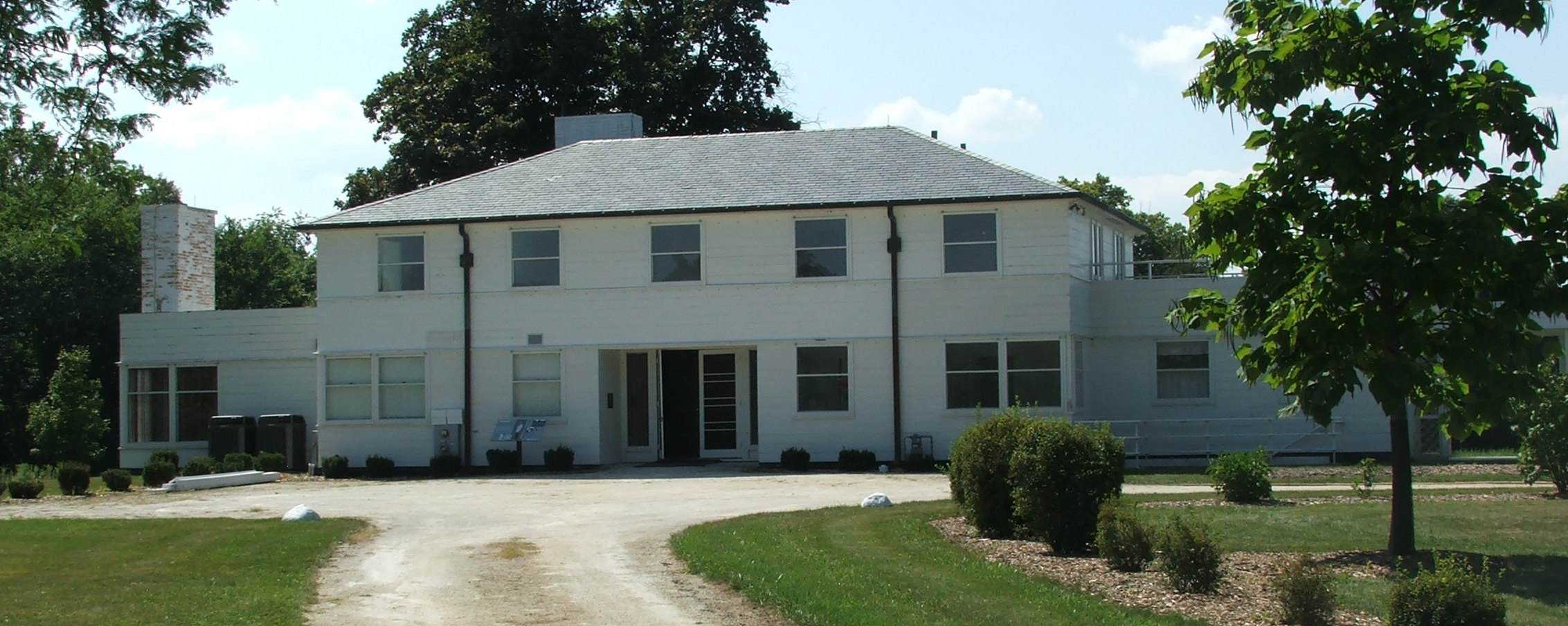
Stevenson's home in Libertyville, Illinois (now Mettawa, Illinois)

On December 1, 1928, Stevenson married Ellen Borden, a well-to-do socialite. The young couple soon became popular and familiar figures on the Chicago social scene; they especially enjoyed attending and hosting costume parties. They had three sons: Adlai Stevenson III, who would become a U.S. Senator; Borden Stevenson, and John Fell Stevenson. In 1935, Adlai and Ellen purchased a 70-acre (28 ha) tract of land along the Des Plaines River near Libertyville, Illinois, a wealthy suburb of Chicago. They built a home on the property and it served as Stevenson's official residence for the rest of his life. Although he spent relatively little time there due to his career, Stevenson did consider the estate to be his home, and in the 1950s, he was often called "The Man from Libertyville" by the national news media. Stevenson also purchased a farm in northwestern Illinois, just outside Galena, where he frequently rode horses and kept some cattle.

On December 12, 1949, Adlai and Ellen were divorced; their son Adlai III later recalled that "There hadn't been a good relationship for a long time. I remember her [Ellen] as the unreasonable one, not only with Dad, but with us and the servants. I was embarrassed by her peremptory way with servants." During both of Stevenson's presidential runs, she publicly declared her support for his opponent, Eisenhower. Several of Stevenson's biographers have written that his wife suffered from mental illness: "Incidents that went from petulant to bizarre to nasty generally have been described without placing them in the context of the progression of [her] increasingly serious mental illness. It was an illness that those closest to her – including Adlai for long after the divorce – were slow and reluctant to recognize. Hindsight, legal proceedings, and psychiatric testimony now make understandable the behavior that baffled and saddened her family." Stevenson did not remarry after his divorce, but instead dated a number of prominent women throughout the rest of his life, including Alicia Patterson, Marietta Tree, and Betty Beale.

=== Religion ===
Stevenson belonged to the Unitarian faith, and was a longtime member of Bloomington's Unitarian church. However, he also occasionally attended Presbyterian services in Libertyville, where a Unitarian church was not present, and as governor he became close friends with the Rev. Richard Graebel, the pastor of Springfield's First Presbyterian church. Graebel "acknowledged that Stevenson's Unitarian rearing had imbued him with the means of translating religious and ethical values into civic issues". According to one historian, "religion never disappeared entirely from his public messages – it was indeed part of his appeal".

== Early career ==
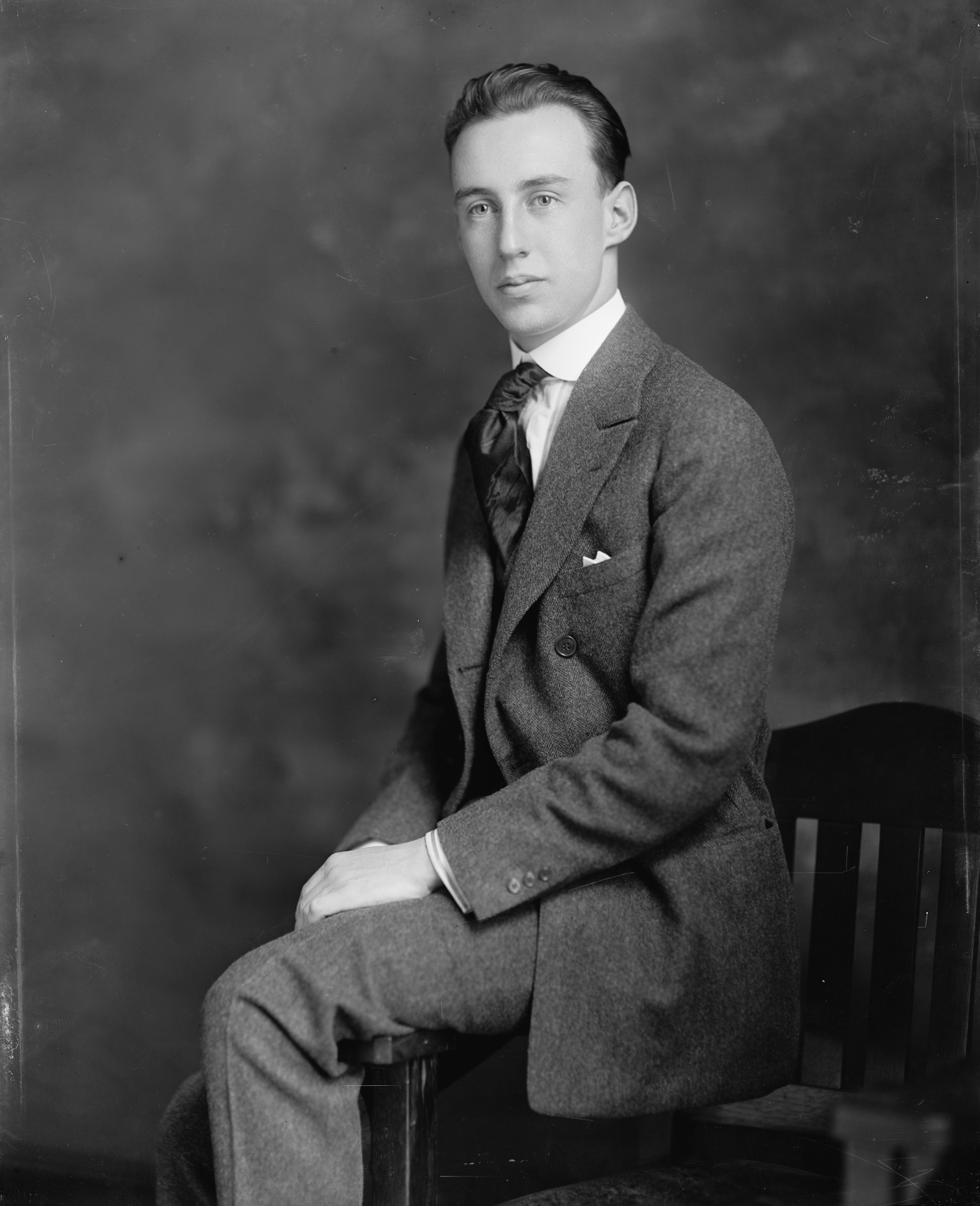
Stevenson c. 1920s

In July 1933, Stevenson took a job opportunity as special attorney and assistant to Jerome Frank, the general counsel of the Agricultural Adjustment Administration (AAA), a part of President Franklin D. Roosevelt's New Deal. Following the repeal of Prohibition in December 1933, Stevenson changed jobs, becoming chief attorney for the Federal Alcohol Control Administration (FACA), a subsidiary of the AAA which regulated the activities of the alcohol industry.

In 1935, Stevenson returned to Chicago to practice law. He became involved in civic activities, particularly as chairman of the Chicago branch of the Committee to Defend America by Aiding the Allies from 1940 to 1941. As chairman, Stevenson worked to raise public support for military and economic aid to the United Kingdom and its allies in fighting Nazi Germany during the Second World War. Stevenson "believed Britain [was] America's first line of defense" and "argued for a repeal of the neutrality legislation" and support for President Roosevelt's Lend-Lease programme. His efforts earned strong criticism from Colonel Robert R. McCormick, the powerful, isolationist publisher of the Chicago Tribune, and a leading member of the non-interventionist America First Committee.

In 1940, Major Frank Knox, newly appointed by President Franklin D. Roosevelt as Secretary of the Navy, offered Stevenson a position as Principal Attorney and special assistant. Stevenson accepted the position and in this capacity wrote speeches, represented Secretary Knox and the Navy on committees, toured the various theaters of war, and handled many administrative duties. Since Knox was largely a figurehead, there were few major roles for Stevenson. However, in early 1944 he joined a mission to Sicily and Italy for the Foreign Economic Administration to report on the country's economy. After Knox died in April 1944, Stevenson returned to Chicago where he attempted to purchase Knox's controlling interest in the Chicago Daily News, but his syndicate was outbid by another party.

In 1945, Stevenson took a temporary position in the State Department, as special assistant to US Secretary of State Edward Stettinius to work with Assistant Secretary of State Archibald MacLeish on a proposed world organization. Later that year, he went to London as Deputy United States Delegate to the Preparatory Commission of the United Nations Organization, a position he held until February 1946. When the head of the delegation fell ill, Stevenson assumed his role. His work at the commission, and in particular his dealings with the representatives of the Soviet Union, resulted in appointments to the US delegations to the United Nations in 1946 and 1947.

== Governor of Illinois (1949–1953) ==
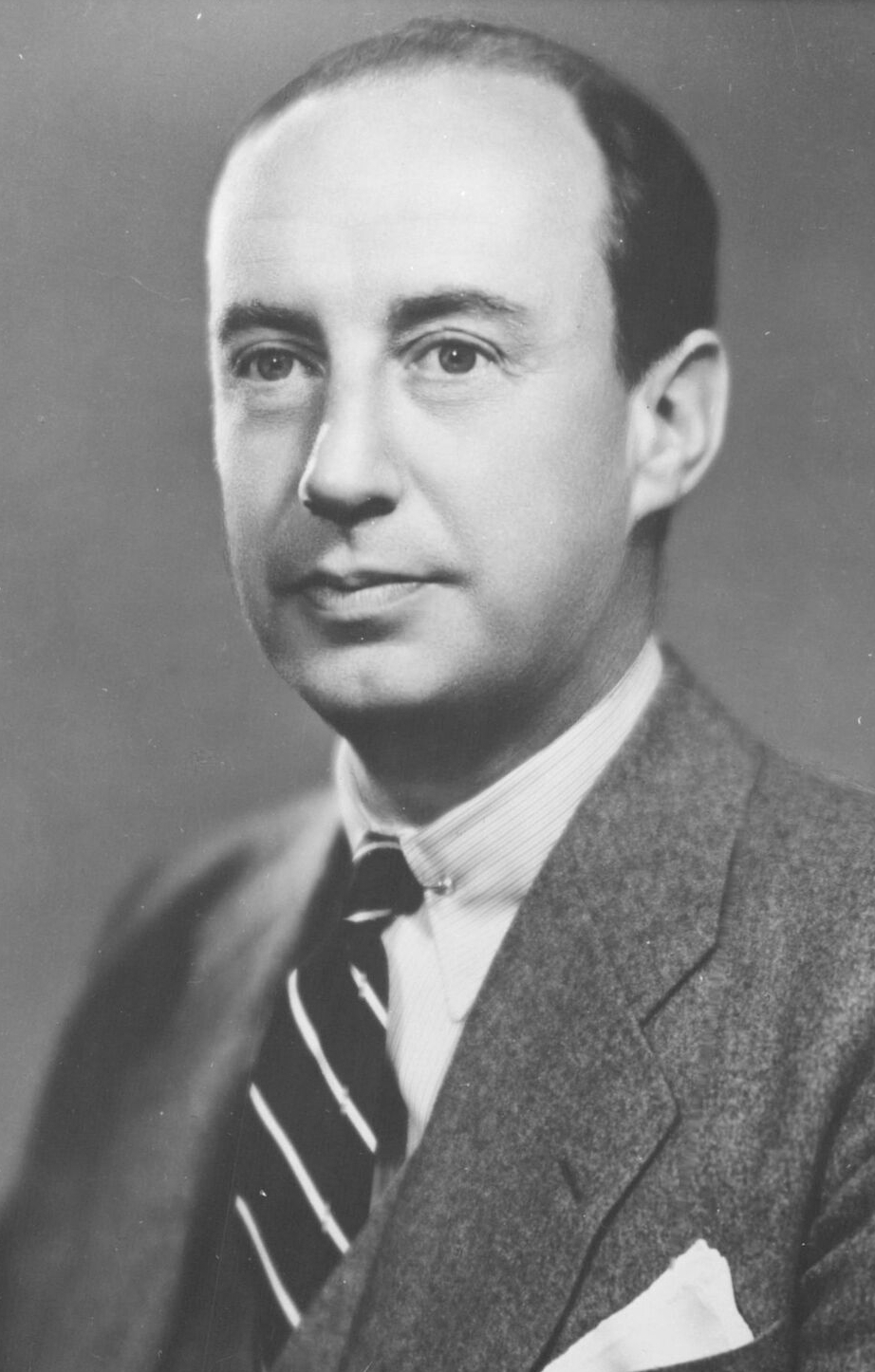
Stevenson as governor c. 1950

In 1948, Stevenson was chosen by Jacob Arvey, leader of the powerful Chicago Democratic political organization, to be the Democratic candidate in the Illinois gubernatorial race against the incumbent Republican, Dwight H. Green. In an upset, Stevenson defeated Green by 572,067 votes, a record margin in Illinois gubernatorial elections. This was significant because President Harry S. Truman, a Democrat, carried Illinois by only 33,612 votes over his Republican opponent, New York Governor Thomas E. Dewey, leading a biographer to write that "Clearly, Adlai had carried the President in with him." Paul Douglas, a University of Chicago professor of economics, was elected senator on the same ticket.

Principal among Stevenson's achievements as Illinois governor were reforming the state police by removing political considerations from hiring practices and instituting a merit system for employment and promotion, cracking down on illegal gambling, and improving the state highways. He sought, with mixed success, to cleanse the Illinois state government of corruption; in one instance he fired the warden of the state penitentiary for overcrowding, political corruption, and incompetence that had left the prisoners on the verge of revolt, and in another instance Stevenson fired the superintendent of an institution for alcoholics when he learned that the superintendent, after receiving bribes from local tavern owners, was allowing the patients to buy drinks at local bars. Two of Stevenson's major initiatives as governor were a proposal to create a constitutional convention (called "con-con") to reform and improve the Illinois state constitution, and several crime bills that would have provided new resources and methods to fight criminal activities in Illinois. Most of the crime bills and con-con failed to pass the state legislature, much to Stevenson's chagrin. However, Stevenson agreed to support a Republican alternative to con-con called "Gateway", it passed the legislature and was approved by Illinois voters in a 1950 referendum. Stevenson's push for an improved state constitution "began the process of constitutional change...and in 1969, four years after his death, the goal was achieved. It was perhaps his most important achievement as governor." The new constitution had the effect of removing the structural limitations on the growth of government in the state.

Stevenson's governorship coincided with the Second Red Scare, and during his term, the Illinois state legislature passed a bill that would have "made it a felony to belong to any subversive group", and would have required "a loyalty oath of public employees and candidates for office." Stevenson vetoed the bill. In his public message regarding the veto, Stevenson wrote:

Does anyone seriously think that a real traitor will hesitate to sign a loyalty oath? Of course not. Really dangerous subversives and saboteurs will be caught by careful, constant, professional investigation, not by pieces of paper. The whole notion of loyalty inquisitions is a natural characteristic of the police state, not of democracy. I know full well this veto will be distorted and misunderstood...I know that to veto this bill in this period of grave anxiety will be unpopular with many. But I must, in good conscience, protest against any unnecessary suppression of our ancient rights as free men...we will win the contest of ideas that afflicts the world not by suppressing those rights, but by their triumph.

Stevenson proved to be a popular public speaker and gained a national reputation as an intellectual, with a self-deprecating sense of humor to match. One example came when the Illinois legislature passed a bill (supported by bird lovers) declaring that cats roaming unescorted were a public nuisance. Stevenson vetoed the bill and sent this public message regarding the veto:

It is in the nature of cats to do a certain amount of unescorted roaming... the problem of cat versus bird is as old as time. If we attempt to solve it by legislation who knows but what we may be called upon to take sides as well in the age old problem of dog versus cat, bird versus bird, or even bird versus worm. In my opinion, the State of Illinois and its local governing bodies already have enough to do without trying to control feline delinquency. For these reasons, and not because I love birds the less or cats the more, I veto and withhold my approval from Senate Bill No. 93.

After Stevenson's divorce in late-1949, his eldest sister, Elizabeth Ives, took over duties as hostess at the Illinois Governor's Mansion that were usually filled by the state's first lady. As a result, in 1952 she was speculated to potentially fill similar hostess duties held by the first lady of the United States if Stevenson were elected president.

On June 2, 1949, Stevenson privately gave a sworn deposition as a character witness for Alger Hiss, a former State Department official who was later found to be a spy for the Soviet Union. Stevenson had infrequently worked with Hiss, first in the legal division of the Agricultural Adjustment Administration in 1933 and then in 1945, 1946, and 1947 on various United Nations projects, but he was not a close friend or associate of him. In the deposition, Stevenson testified that the reputation of Hiss for integrity, loyalty, and veracity was good. In 1950, Hiss was found guilty of perjury on the spying charges. Stevenson's deposition, according to his biographer Porter McKeever, would later be used in the 1952 presidential campaign by senators Joseph McCarthy and Richard Nixon to "inflame public opinion and attack Adlai as 'soft on communism'." In the 1952 campaign, Senator Nixon would claim that Stevenson's "defense of Hiss" reflected such "poor judgment" on his part that "doubt was cast about Adlai's capacity to govern." In a 1952 appearance on NBC's Meet the Press, Stevenson responded to a question about his deposition for Hiss by saying, "I'm a lawyer. I think that one of the most fundamental responsibilities... particularly of lawyers, is to give testimony in a court of law, to give it honestly and willingly, and it will be a very unhappy day for Anglo-Saxon justice when a man, even in public life, is too timid to state what he knows and what he has heard about a defendant in a criminal trial for fear that defendant might later be convicted. That would to me be the ultimate timidity."

As governor, Stevenson issued an executive order that made it so concession leases for Illinois state parks said, "The concessionaire agrees that no person shall be denied or rejected full and equal use of accommodations or facilities on account of race, color or religion." Stevenson also desegregated the Illinois National Guard.

Stevenson was governor during the Cicero race riot of 1951 in which violent protest happened in response to a black family attempting to move to a white neighborhood with the family's apartment being broken into by a mob and their furniture burned on the street. The police were not able to end the riot and the National Guard was called out by Stevenson. In response to the riot Stevenson stated:

Deep beneath the Cicero disorders and the breakdown of local law enforcement, lie the fears, the alarms, the pressures, and tensions of the continuously critical housing shortage. . . . Large numbers of the low income groups, and among them large numbers of the so-called minority groups, are inadequately housed, rigidly segregated, and confined to slums and deteriorated residential areas. The demoralizing effects of overcrowding, of substandard housing, inadequate sanitation, illegal building conversions, and a host of resultant social evils, are placing a server strain upon the whole range of state and municipal welfare services. This is the root of the Cicero affair—the grim reality underlying the tension and violence that accompany the efforts of minority group members to break through the iron curtain which confines so many of our fellow citizens.

== Presidential campaigns ==
=== 1952 presidential election ===
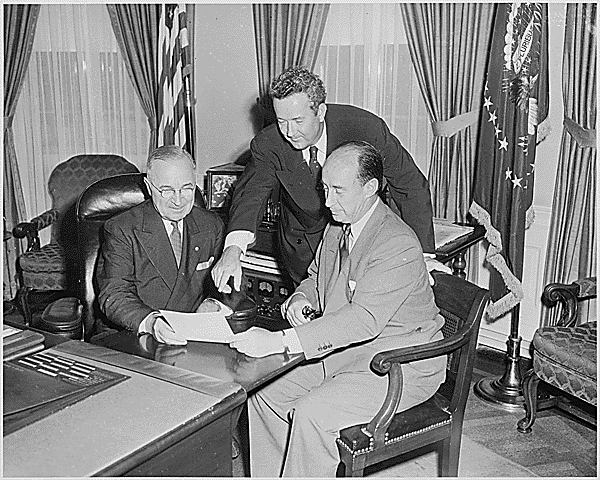
President Harry S. Truman, vice presidential nominee Alabama senator John Sparkman and presidential nominee Illinois governor Adlai Stevenson in the Oval Office, 1952

Early in 1952, while Stevenson was still governor of Illinois, President Harry S. Truman decided that he would not seek another term as president. Instead, Truman met with Stevenson in Washington and proposed that Stevenson seek the Democratic nomination for president; Truman promised him his support if he did so. Stevenson at first hesitated, arguing that he was committed to running for a second gubernatorial term in Illinois. However, a number of his friends and associates (such as George Wildman Ball) quietly began organizing a "draft Stevenson" movement for president; they persisted in their activity even when Stevenson (both publicly and privately) told them to stop. When Stevenson continued to state that he was not a candidate, President Truman and the Democratic Party leadership looked for other prospective candidates. However, each of the other main contenders had a major weakness. Senator Estes Kefauver of Tennessee won most of the presidential primaries and entered the 1952 Democratic National Convention with the largest number of delegates, but he was unpopular with President Truman and other prominent Democrats. In 1950, Kefauver had chaired a Senate committee that traveled to several large cities and held televised hearings into organized crime. The hearings revealed connections between organized-crime syndicates and big-city Democratic political organizations, which led Truman and other Democratic leaders to oppose Kefauver's bid for the nomination: "a machine politician and proud of it, [Truman] had no use for reformers who blackened the names of fellow Democrats." Truman favored U.S. diplomat W. Averell Harriman, but he had never held elected office and was inexperienced in national politics. Truman next turned to his vice-president, Alben Barkley, but at 74 years of age he was dismissed as being too old by labor union leaders. Senator Richard Russell Jr. of Georgia was popular in the South and his campaign easily won the Florida primary, but his support for racial segregation and opposition to civil rights for blacks made him unacceptable to Northern and Western Democrats. In the end, Stevenson, despite his reluctance to run, remained the most attractive candidate heading into the 1952 Democratic National Convention in Chicago.

At the convention, Stevenson, as governor of the host state, was assigned to give the welcoming address to the delegates. His speech was so stirring and witty that it invigorated efforts to secure the nomination for him, in spite of his continued protests that he was not a presidential candidate. In his welcoming speech he poked fun at the 1952 Republican National Convention, which had been held in Chicago in the same coliseum two weeks earlier. Stevenson described the achievements of the Democratic Party under presidents Franklin Roosevelt and Harry Truman, but noted:

our Republican friends have said it was all a miserable failure. For almost a week pompous phrases marched over this landscape in search of an idea, and the only idea that they found was that the two great decades of progress...were the misbegotten spawn of bungling, of corruption, of socialism, of mismanagement, of waste and worse...after listening to this everlasting procession of epithets about our [party's] misdeeds I was even surprised the next morning when the mail was delivered on time. But we Democrats were by no means the only victims here. First they [Republicans] slaughtered each other, and then they went after us...perhaps the proximity of the stockyards accounts for the carnage.

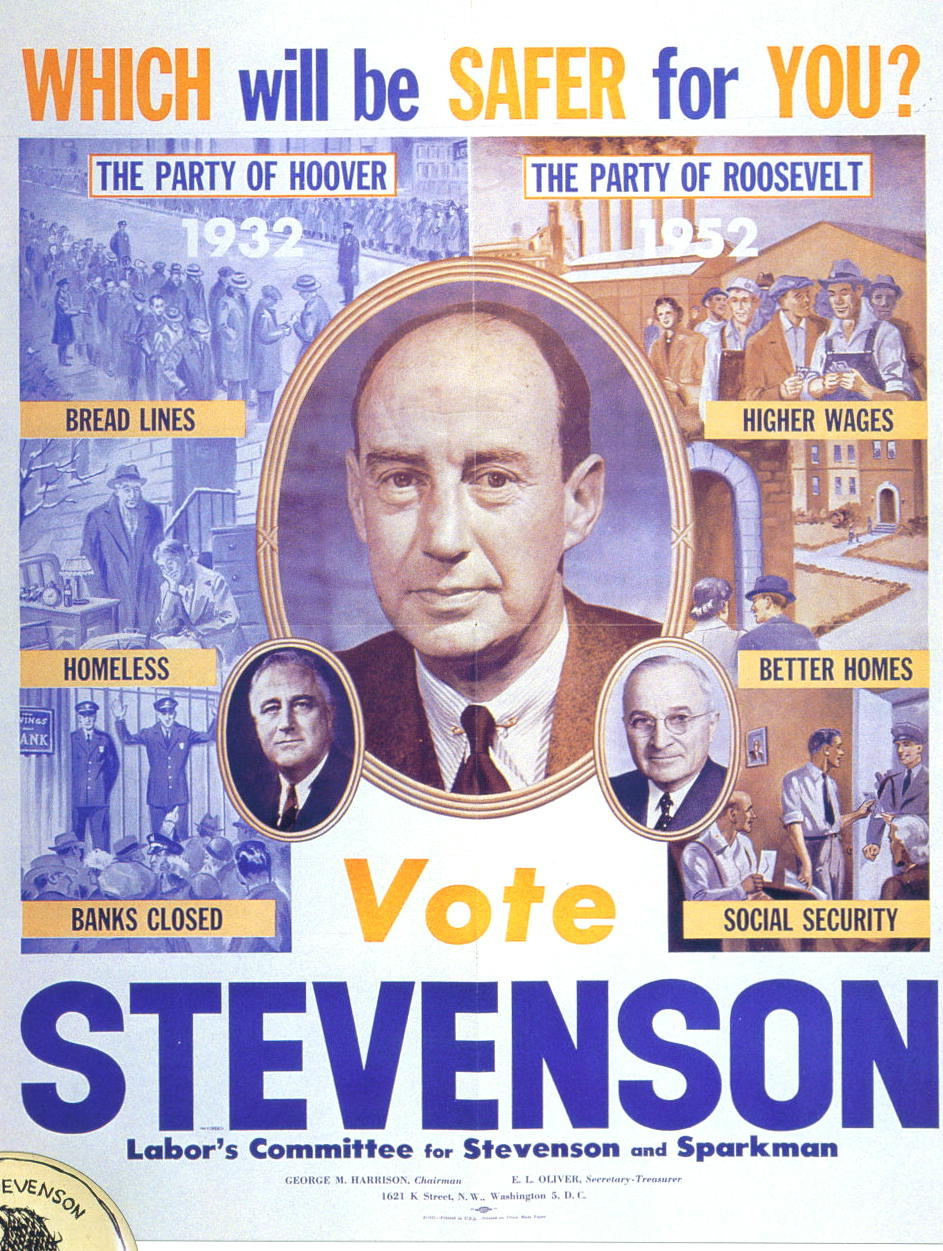
A poster from the 1952 campaign

Following this speech, the Illinois delegation (led by Jacob Arvey) announced that they would place Stevenson's name in nomination, and Stevenson called President Truman to ask if "he would be embarrassed" if Stevenson formally announced his candidacy for the nomination. Truman told Stevenson "I have been trying since January to get you to say that. Why should it embarrass me?" Kefauver led on the first ballot, but was well below the vote total he needed to win. Stevenson gradually gained strength until he was nominated on the third ballot. The 1952 Democratic National Convention was the last political convention of either major party to require more than one ballot to nominate a presidential candidate.

Historian John Frederick Martin says party leaders selected Stevenson because he was "more moderate on civil rights than Estes Kefauver, yet nonetheless acceptable to labor and urban machines—so a coalition of southern, urban, and labor leaders fell in behind his candidacy in Chicago". Stevenson's 1952 running mate was Senator John Sparkman of Alabama.

Stevenson accepted the Democratic nomination with an acceptance speech that, according to contemporaries, "electrified the delegates:"

When the tumult and the shouting die, when the bands are gone and the lights are dimmed, there is the stark reality of responsibility in an hour of history haunted with those gaunt, grim specters of strife, dissension, and materialism at home, and ruthless, inscrutable, and hostile power abroad. The ordeal of the twentieth century – the bloodiest, most turbulent age of the Christian era – is far from over. Sacrifice, patience, understanding, and implacable purpose may be our lot for years to come. ... Let's talk sense to the American people! Let's tell them the truth, that there are no gains without pains, that we are now on the eve of great decisions.

Although Stevenson's eloquent oratory and thoughtful, stylish demeanor impressed many intellectuals, journalists, political commentators, and members of the nation's academic community, the Republicans and some working-class Democrats ridiculed what they perceived as his indecisive, aristocratic air. During the 1952 campaign Stewart Alsop, a powerful Connecticut Republican, labeled Stevenson an "egghead", based on his baldness and intellectual air. His brother, the influential newspaper columnist Joe Alsop, used the word to underscore Stevenson's difficulty in attracting working-class voters, and the nickname stuck. Stevenson himself made fun of his "egghead" nickname; in one speech he joked "eggheads of the world unite, you have nothing to lose but your yolks!" In his campaign speeches Stevenson strongly criticized the Communist-hunting tactics of Senator Joseph McCarthy, labeling "McCarthy's kind of patriotism" as "a disgrace" and ridiculing right-wing Republicans "who hunt Communists in the Bureau of Wildlife and Fisheries while hesitating to aid the gallant men and women who are resisting the real thing in the front lines of Europe and Asia...they are finally the men who seemingly believe that we can confound the Kremlin by frightening ourselves to death." In return, Senator McCarthy stated in a speech that "he would like to get on the Stevenson campaign trail with a club and thereby make a good and loyal American out of the governor".

In the 1952 campaign, Stevenson also developed a strong dislike for Richard M. Nixon, then the GOP vice-presidential candidate. "Adlai literally loathed Nixon. No other person aroused such disgust; not even Joseph McCarthy...Friends who often wished he could be more of a hater were awed at the strength of his distaste for Nixon." A biographer wrote that "for Stevenson, Nixon was an ambitious, unprincipled partisan who craved winning, the exact personification of what was wrong with modern American politics...[for Stevenson] Nixon was an entirely plastic politician...Nixon was Stevenson's complete villain. Others sensed the potential for immorality that led to Nixon's humiliating resignation in 1974, but Stevenson was among the first." During the 1952 campaign Stevenson often used his wit to attack Nixon, and once stated that Nixon "was the kind of politician who would cut down a redwood tree, and then mount the stump and make a speech for [tree] conservation".

Journalist David Halberstam later wrote that "Stevenson [was] an elegant campaigner who raised the political discourse" and that in 1952 "Stevenson reinvigorated [the Democratic Party] and made it seem an open and exciting place for a generation of younger Americans who might otherwise never have thought of working for a political candidate." During the campaign, a photograph revealed a hole in the sole of Stevenson's right shoe. This became a symbol of Stevenson's frugality and earthiness. The Eisenhower campaign attempted to use the symbol of the shoe with a hole to criticize Stevenson in advertising, to which Stevenson said, “Better a hole in the shoe than a hole in the head.” Photographer William M. Gallagher of the Flint Journal won the 1953 Pulitzer Prize on the strength of the image.

Stevenson did not use television as effectively as his Republican opponent, war hero Dwight D. Eisenhower, and was unable to rally the New Deal voting coalition for one last hurrah. Historian Richard Aldous wrote "Occasionally persuasive, [Stevenson] was rarely compelling and, unlike Eisenhower, he lacked any kind of rapport or common touch with large crowds. He also failed to respond quickly enough to Eisenhower's pioneering use of TV. Both candidates resisted the new medium at first, but Ike relented sooner. He used "Mad Men" advertising executive Rosser Reeves of the Ted Bates agency to create brilliant thirty-second TV spots. Ironically, Stevenson came across well on TV, but his arrogant nature caused him to minimize it in the campaign. "This is the worst thing I've ever heard of," he scoffed, "selling the presidency like breakfast cereal!" That attitude left him behind the curve." On election day, Eisenhower won the national popular vote by 55% to 45%. Stevenson lost heavily outside the Solid South; he carried only nine states and lost the Electoral College vote 442 to 89. In his concession speech on election night, Stevenson said: "Someone asked me...how I felt, and I was reminded of a story that a fellow townsman of ours used to tell – Abraham Lincoln. He said he felt like the little boy who had stubbed his toe in the dark. He said that he was too old to cry, but it hurt too much to laugh."

Biographer Jean H. Baker summarized Stevenson's 1952 campaign: "Uncomfortable with the carnival side of elections, Stevenson tried to be a man for the people, not of them; a man of reason talking sense, not manipulation or sentiment." She continued:

Liberals...were attracted to the Illinois governor because he firmly opposed McCarthyism, [and] they also appreciated Stevenson because of his style...he had clearly dissociated himself, as did many Americans, from the plebians. Stevenson dramatized the complex feelings of educated elites, some of whom came to adore him not because he was a liberal, but because he was not...he spoke a language that set apart from average Americans an increasingly college-educated population. His approach to voters as rational participants in a process that depended on weighing the issues attracted reformers, intellectuals, and middle-class women with time and money (the "Shakespeare vote", joked one columnist). Or as one enthralled voter wrote "You were too good for the American people ... Adlai Stevenson ended the 1952 campaign with an adoring group of Stevensonites. Articulate and loyal...they would soon create the Stevenson legend and make the Man from Libertyville a counterhero to President Eisenhower, whom they would portray as inept and banal."

=== 1953 world tour and 1954 elections ===
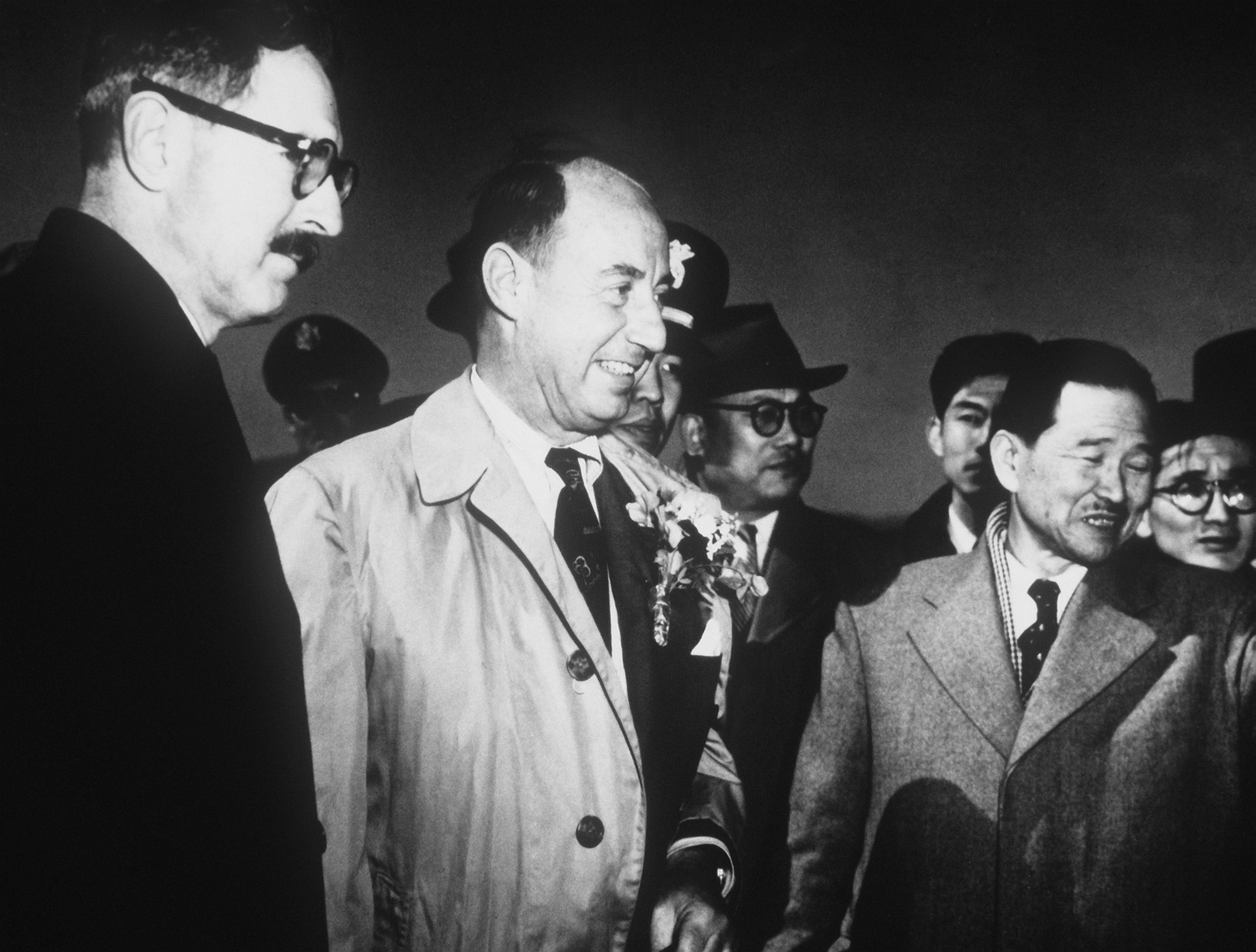
Stevenson in March 1953 at U.S. Air Force 17th Bomb Wing base in Korea, joined by US ambassador to Korea Ellis O. Briggs (left), acting foreign minister of the Republic of Korea Cho Chong-Hwan (second from right) and acting prime minister Paik Too-chin (far right)

Following his defeat, Stevenson in 1953 made a well-publicized world tour through Asia, the Middle East and Europe, writing about his travels for Look magazine. His political stature as head of the Democratic Party gave him access to many foreign leaders and dignitaries. He was elected a Fellow of the American Academy of Arts and Sciences in 1953. In the 1954 off-year elections, Stevenson took a leading role in campaigning for Democratic congressional and gubernatorial candidates around the nation. When the Democrats won control of both houses of Congress and picked up nine gubernatorial seats it "put Democrats around the country in Stevenson's debt and greatly strengthened his position as his party's leader."

=== 1956 presidential election ===
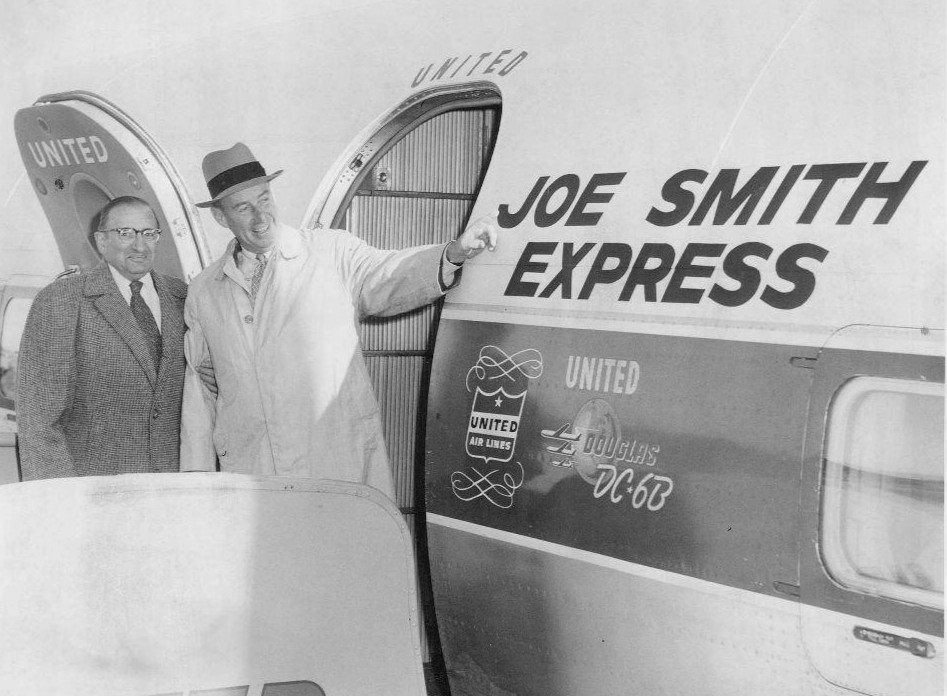
Stevenson and supporter Joe Smith leave Chicago's O'Hare Airport for four days of campaigning in the Pacific Northwest and California

Unlike 1952, Stevenson was an announced, active candidate for the Democratic presidential nomination in 1956. Initially, with polls showing Eisenhower headed for a landslide re-election, few Democrats wanted the 1956 nomination, and Stevenson hoped that he could win the nomination without a serious contest, and without entering any presidential primaries. However, on September 24, 1955, Eisenhower suffered a serious heart attack. Although he recovered and eventually decided to run for a second term, concerns about his health led two prominent Democrats, Tennessee Senator Estes Kefauver and New York Governor Averell Harriman, to decide to challenge Stevenson for the Democratic nomination. After being told by his aides that he needed to enter and win several presidential primaries to defeat Kefauver and Harriman, Stevenson officially entered the race on November 16, 1955, and campaigned in the Minnesota, Florida, and California primaries. Stevenson was upset in the Minnesota primary by Kefauver, who successfully portrayed him as a "captive" of corrupt Chicago political bosses and "a corporation lawyer out of step with regular Democrats". Stevenson next battled Kefauver in the Florida primary, where he agreed to debate Kefauver on radio and television. Stevenson later joked that in Florida he had appealed to the state's citrus farmers by "bitterly denouncing the Japanese beetle and fearlessly attacking the Mediterranean fruit fly". He narrowly defeated Kefauver in Florida by 12,000 votes, and then won the California primary over Kefauver with 63% of the vote, effectively ending Kefauver's presidential bid.

At the 1956 Democratic National Convention in Chicago, former President Truman endorsed Governor Harriman, to Stevenson's dismay, but the blow was softened by former first lady Eleanor Roosevelt's continued enthusiastic support. Stevenson easily defeated Harriman on the first ballot, winning his second Democratic presidential nomination. He was aided by strong support from younger delegates, who were said to form the core of the "New Politics" movement. In a bid to raise enthusiasm for the Democratic ticket, Stevenson made the unusual decision to leave the selection of his running mate up to the convention delegates. This set off a frantic scramble among several prominent Democrats to win the vice-presidential nomination, including Kefauver, Senator Hubert Humphrey, and Senator John F. Kennedy. After fending off a surprisingly strong challenge from Kennedy, Kefauver narrowly won the vice-presidential nomination on the second ballot. In his acceptance speech, Stevenson spoke of his plan for a "New America", which included extending New Deal programs to "areas of education, health, and poverty". He also criticized Republicans for trying to "merchandise candidates like breakfast cereal".

Following his nomination, Stevenson waged a vigorous presidential campaign, delivering 300 speeches and traveling 55,000 miles (89,000 km); he crisscrossed the nation three times before the election in November. Robert F. Kennedy traveled with the Stevenson campaign, hoping to "take home some lessons on how to manage a presidential campaign". Kennedy was deeply disillusioned by Stevenson's campaign, later saying that "I thought it was ghastly. It was poorly organized...my feeling was that he had no rapport with his audience – no comprehension of what campaigning required, no ability to make decisions...In 1952 I had been crazy about him...Then I spent six weeks with him on the campaign and he destroyed it all." Kennedy voted for Eisenhower in November. For their part, Stevenson and many of his aides resented Kennedy's attitude during his stay with the campaign; Stevenson friend and aide George W. Ball recalled "My impression was that Bobby was a very surly and arrogant young man...he wasn't doing any good for Adlai. I don't know why we had him along." The tension that developed between Stevenson and Robert Kennedy would have significant consequences for the 1960 presidential campaign, and for Stevenson's relationships with both John and Robert Kennedy during President Kennedy's administration.

Against the advice of many of his political advisers, Stevenson insisted on calling for an international ban to aboveground nuclear weapons tests, and for an end to the military draft. Despite strong criticism from President Eisenhower and other leading Republicans, such as Vice President Nixon and former New York Governor Thomas Dewey, that his proposals were naïve and would benefit the Soviet Union in the Cold War, Stevenson held his ground and said in various speeches that "Earth's atmosphere is contaminated from week to week by exploding hydrogen bombs...We don't want to live forever in the shadow of a radioactive mushroom cloud... [and] growing children are the principal potential sufferers" of increased strontium 90 in the atmosphere. In the end, Stevenson's push to ban atmospheric nuclear bomb tests "cost him dearly in votes," but "Adlai finally won the verdict," as Eisenhower suspended above-ground nuclear tests in 1958, President Kennedy would sign the Partial Nuclear Test Ban Treaty into law in 1963, and President Nixon would end the military draft in 1973.

Civil rights was emerging rapidly as a major political issue. Stevenson urged caution and warned against aggressive enforcement of the Supreme Court's decision in Brown v. Board of Education in order to gain Southern white support. Kotlowski writes:

Liberal Democrats, too, flinched before Brown. Adlai E. Stevenson, front-runner for the party's presidential nomination in 1956, urged the government to "proceed gradually" on school desegregation in deference to the South's long-held "traditions". Stevenson backed integration but opposed using armed personnel to enforce Brown.... It certainly helped. Stevenson carried most of Dixie in the fall campaign but received just 61 percent of the black vote, low for a Democrat, and lost the election to Eisenhower by a landslide.

Stevenson's views on racial progress were described after his death by his long-time companion Marietta Tree as: "He thought of all Negroes as being loveable old family retainers and not as individuals like you and me who were longing to get educated and who had aspirations and dreams just like the rest of us. I think this took him a long time to get over--the fact that they really indeed not only were created equal; they wanted equality of opportunity and wanted it now. It was hard for him to understand the urgency."

While President Eisenhower suffered heart problems, the economy enjoyed robust health. Stevenson's hopes for victory were dashed when, in October, Eisenhower's doctors gave him a clean bill of health and the Suez Crisis and Revolution in Hungary erupted simultaneously. The public was not convinced that a change in leadership was needed. Stevenson lost his second bid for the presidency by a landslide, winning only 42% of the popular vote and 73 electoral votes from just seven states, all except Missouri in the solid Democratic South.

Early in 1957, Stevenson resumed law practice and allied himself with Judge Simon H. Rifkind to create a law firm based in Washington, DC. (Stevenson, Paul, Rifkind, Wharton & Garrison), and a second firm in Chicago (Stevenson, Rifkind & Wirtz). Both law firms were related to New York City's Paul, Weiss, Rifkind, Wharton & Garrison. Stevenson's associates in the new law firm included Willard Wirtz, William McCormick Blair Jr., and Newton N. Minow; each of these men later served in the Kennedy and Johnson administrations. He also accepted an appointment, along with other prominent Democrats, to the new Democratic Advisory Council, which "pursued an aggressive line in attacking the [Republican] Eisenhower administration and in developing new Democratic policies". He was also employed part-time by the Encyclopædia Britannica as a legal consultant.

=== 1960 presidential election ===
In early 1960, Stevenson announced that he would not seek a third Democratic presidential nomination, but would accept a draft. One of his closest friends told a journalist that "Deep down, he wants [the Democratic nomination]. But he wants the [Democratic] Convention to come to him, he doesn't want to go to the Convention." In May 1960, Senator John F. Kennedy, who was actively campaigning for the Democratic nomination, visited Stevenson at his Libertyville home. Kennedy asked Stevenson for a public endorsement of his candidacy; in exchange Kennedy promised, if elected, to appoint Stevenson as his Secretary of State. Stevenson turned down the offer, which strained relations between the two men. At the 1960 Democratic National Convention in Los Angeles, Stevenson's admirers, led by Eleanor Roosevelt, Agnes Meyer, and such Hollywood celebrities as Dore Schary and Henry Fonda, vigorously promoted him for the nomination, even though he was not an announced candidate. JFK's campaign manager, his brother Robert F. Kennedy, reportedly threatened Stevenson in a meeting, telling him that unless he agreed to place his brother's name in nomination "you are through". Stevenson refused and ordered him out of his hotel room. In letters to friends, Stevenson described both John and Robert Kennedy as "cold and ruthless", referred to Robert Kennedy as the "Black Prince", and expressed his belief that JFK, "though bright and able, was too young, too unseasoned, to be President; he pushed too hard, was in too much of a hurry; he lacked the wisdom of humility...[Stevenson felt] that both Kennedy and the nation would benefit from a postponement of his ambition."

The night before the balloting, Stevenson began working actively for the nomination, calling the leaders of several state delegations to ask for their support. The key call went to Chicago Mayor Richard J. Daley, the leader of the Illinois delegation. The delegation had already voted to give Kennedy 59.5 votes to Stevenson's 2, but Stevenson told Daley that he now wanted the Democratic nomination, and asked him if the "delegates' vote might merely indicate they thought he was not a candidate". Daley told Stevenson that he had no support in the delegation. Stevenson then "asked if this meant no support in fact or no support because the delegates thought he was not a candidate. Daley replied that Stevenson had no support." According to Stevenson's biographer John Bartlow Martin, the phone conversation with Daley "was the real end of the [1960] Stevenson candidacy...if he could not get the support of his home state his candidacy was doomed". However, Stevenson continued to work for the nomination the next day, fulfilling what he felt were obligations to old friends and supporters such as Eleanor Roosevelt and Agnes Meyer. Senator Eugene McCarthy of Minnesota delivered an impassioned nominating speech for Stevenson, urging the convention to not "reject the man who has made us proud to be Democrats. Do not leave this prophet without honor in his own party." However, Kennedy won the nomination on the first ballot with 806 delegate votes; Stevenson finished in fourth place with 79.5 votes.

== Ambassador to the United Nations ==
Once Kennedy won the nomination, Stevenson, who was always an enormously popular public speaker, campaigned actively for him. Due to his two presidential nominations and previous United Nations experience, Stevenson perceived himself an elder statesman and the natural choice for Secretary of State. However, according to historian Robert Dallek, "neither Jack nor Bobby [Kennedy] thought all that well of Stevenson...they saw him as rather prissy and ineffective. [Stevenson] never met their standard of tough-mindedness." Stevenson's refusal to publicly endorse Kennedy before the Democratic Convention was something that Kennedy "couldn't forgive", with JFK telling a Stevenson supporter after the election, "I'm not going to give him anything." The prestigious post of Secretary of State went instead to the (then) little-known Dean Rusk. However, "although Jack and Bobby would have been just as happy to freeze Stevenson out of the administration, they felt compelled to offer him something" due to his continued support from progressive Democrats. President Kennedy offered Stevenson the choice of becoming ambassador to Britain, attorney general (a post that eventually went to Robert Kennedy), or United States Ambassador to the United Nations. Stevenson accepted the UN position.

Many years later, it was revealed that during the campaign Stevenson was approached by Soviet ambassador Mikhail A. Menshikov, who offered Soviet financial and public relations help to assist him in getting elected if he decided to run. Stevenson flatly rejected the Soviet offer, telling Menshikov that he "considered the offer of such assistance highly improper, indiscreet and dangerous to all concerned". Stevenson then reported the incident directly to President Eisenhower.

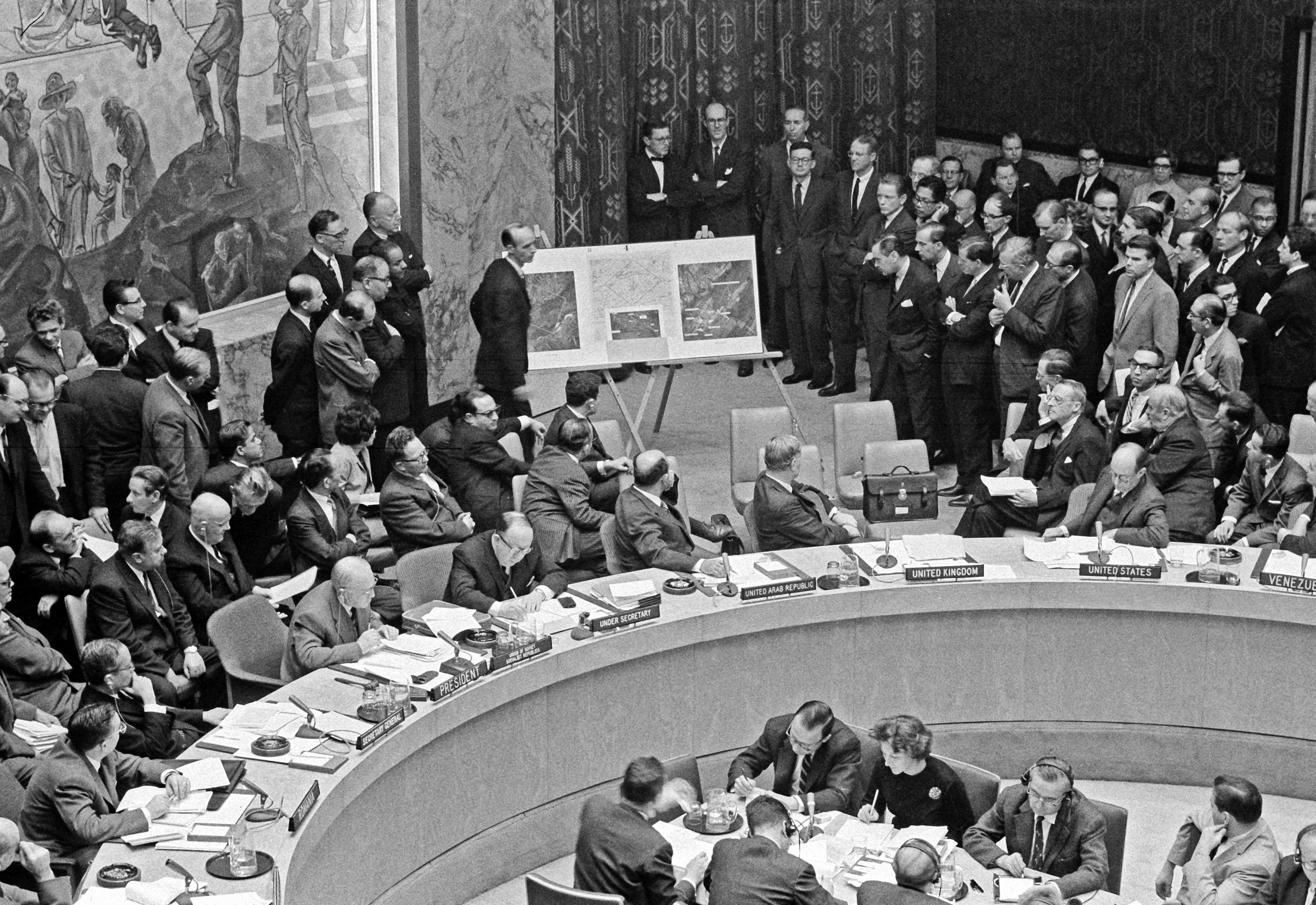
Stevenson shows aerial photos of Cuban missiles to the United Nations

At the United Nations, Stevenson worked tirelessly to support U.S. foreign policy, even when he personally disagreed with some of President Kennedy's actions. However, he was often seen as an outsider in the Kennedy administration, with one historian noting "everyone knew that Stevenson's position was that of a bit player". Kennedy told his adviser Walt Rostow that "Stevenson wouldn't be happy as president. He thinks that if you talk long enough you get a soft option and there are very few soft options as president."

=== Bay of Pigs incident ===
In April 1961 Stevenson suffered the greatest humiliation of his diplomatic career in the Bay of Pigs invasion. After hearing rumors that "a lot of refugees wanted to go back and overthrow Castro", Stevenson voiced his skepticism about an invasion, but "he was kept on the fringes of the operation, receiving...nine days before the invasion, only an unduly vague briefing by Arthur M. Schlesinger Jr." and the CIA. Senior CIA official Tracy Barnes told Stevenson and his staff that "there was going to be a clandestine operation in Cuba...it was strictly a Cuban affair. It would have some American cooperation, but only with the training and financing." According to historian Peter Wyden, Barnes did not tell Stevenson that there would be a large-scale invasion of Cuba, nor did he provide details about the full extent of American support for, and involvement with, the Cuban rebels, nor did he tell Stevenson about the planned air strikes to destroy Castro's air force. Kennedy Library historian Sheldon Stern interviewed Ambassador Charles W. Yost, Stevenson's deputy, who attended the meeting and confirmed that Yost had been suspicious of the story from the start. Yost agreed that this was another one of the CIA's "clumsy tricks". Assistant Secretary of State Harlan Cleveland, who attended the briefing, felt that Barnes was too evasive in his description of the operation, and that it was clear that Stevenson was not to be given the full details of the invasion plan. Historian Garry Wills has written that "news of the invasion was leaking out...Castro knew the landings would occur; only Adlai Stevenson was kept in the dark" about the invasion by President Kennedy and his aides.

Kennedy, anticipating that Stevenson might be angered at being left out of the discussions over whether to invade Cuba, told Schlesinger that "the integrity and credibility of Adlai Stevenson constitute one of our great national assets. I don't want to do anything to jeopardize that", and he asked Schlesinger to let Stevenson know that the president was shielding him from many of the details to protect him in case the clandestine operation failed. Instead, as Robert Dallek has written, "by leaving him out of the discussion it led to his humiliation". Unaware that the anti-Castro Cuban exiles landing at the Bay of Pigs were being armed and assisted directly by the CIA and US Navy, and that American pilots were participating in bombing raids of Cuban targets, Stevenson unwittingly "repeated a CIA cover story in a speech before the UN General Assembly". He argued that the rebels were not assisted in any way by the U.S. government; when this claim was proven to be false Stevenson complained that "I took this job on the understanding that I would be consulted and kept fully informed on everything. Now my credibility has been compromised and therefore my usefulness." When he told his friend Harlan Cleveland that his own government had "deliberately tricked" him into believing there was no direct American involvement in the invasion, Cleveland replied "I feel as betrayed as you do." Stevenson seriously considered resigning, but was convinced by his friends and President Kennedy to stay.

=== Cuban Missile Crisis ===
During the Cuban Missile Crisis in October 1962, Stevenson gave a presentation at an emergency session of the Security Council. In his presentation, which attracted national television coverage, he forcefully asked Soviet UN representative Valerian Zorin if his country was installing nuclear missiles in Cuba, and when Zorin appeared reluctant to reply, Stevenson punctuated with the demand "Don't wait for the translation, [answer] 'yes' or 'no'!" When Zorin replied that "I am not in an American court of law, and therefore do not answer a question put to me in the manner of a prosecuting counsel...you will have your answer in due course", Stevenson retorted, "I am prepared to wait for my answer until Hell freezes over." Stevenson then showed photographs taken by a U-2 spy plane which proved the existence of nuclear missiles in Cuba, just after Zorin had implied they did not exist.

Stevenson also attended several meetings of the EXCOMM at the White House during the Missile Crisis, where he boldly proposed to make an exchange with the Soviets: if they would remove their missiles from Cuba, the United States would agree to remove its obsolete Jupiter missiles from Turkey. However, he faced strong opposition from some other EXCOMM members, who regarded such an exchange as a sign of weakness. According to Kennedy adviser and Stevenson friend George W. Ball, who was present, these members "intemperately upbraided Stevenson...[and were] outraged and shrill". However, President Kennedy remarked "You have to admire Adlai, he sticks to his position even when everyone is jumping on him", and Robert Kennedy wrote that "Stevenson has since been criticized for the position he took at the meeting...although I disagreed strongly with his recommendations, I thought he was courageous to make them, and I might add that they made as much sense as some others considered during that period of time." Stevenson remarked "I know that most of those fellows will consider me a coward for the rest of my life for what I said today, but perhaps we need a coward in the room when we are talking about nuclear war." In fact, the Kennedy Administration did remove the Jupiter-class MRBMs from Italy and Turkey some six months after the Cuban Missile Crisis ended, and there is evidence that President Kennedy privately agreed that, if the Soviets would remove their missiles from Cuba, he would remove the Jupiter missiles from Turkey and Italy at a later date. The deal was kept a secret for many years, however, and Stevenson was thus given no credit for his original suggestion.

In December 1962 journalists Stewart Alsop and Charles Bartlett published an article about the Missile Crisis in the Saturday Evening Post. The article quoted a "non-admiring official" who claimed that Stevenson "Wanted a Munich. He wanted to trade U.S. bases for Cuban bases" and generally portrayed Stevenson's behavior and actions during the Missile Crisis as weak and inept. Stevenson was deeply angered by the article, especially as it was widely believed that the "non-admiring" official who criticized Stevenson was President Kennedy himself – "Kennedy had fed the Stevenson story to Alsop and Bartlett, partly because it enabled him to look strong" in comparison to Stevenson. However, a number of Stevenson's friends and supporters, such as historian and White House aide Arthur Schlesinger Jr., came to Stevenson's defense. Schlesinger told Kennedy "The suggestion in the Alsop-Bartlett story that Stevenson favored a Caribbean Munich is grossly unfair and shows the number of people who still have their knives out for him." Stevenson, knowing that Bartlett was a close friend of President Kennedy, assumed that the article had been written with Kennedy's permission and let the president know through friends that if Kennedy had wanted him to resign, "he did not have to go about it in such a roundabout fashion." Kennedy told Stevenson that he did not want him to resign and had his Press Secretary, Pierre Salinger, release a letter to the press praising Stevenson's performance during the Missile Crisis. Although the letter did "cause the public furor to die down... for months Washington continued to buzz over what everyone saw as an effort to force Adlai's resignation", and Stevenson friend George Ball later said that the "injury inflicted by the magazine article lingered on and on... After the Cuban Missile Crisis, Adlai was only going through the motions. From then on, he knew he was not going to have an impact on foreign policy."

=== Kennedy assassination and Vietnam War ===
During his time as UN ambassador, Stevenson often traveled around the country promoting the United Nations in speeches and seminars. On these trips, he frequently faced opposition and protests from groups skeptical of the United Nations, such as the right-wing John Birch Society. On October 25, 1963, Stevenson spoke in Dallas, Texas, where he was heckled and spat upon by unruly protestors led by retired General Edwin Walker's "National Indignation Convention". At one point a woman hit Stevenson on the head with a sign, leading Stevenson to remark "is she animal or human?", and telling a policeman "I don't want her to go to jail, I want her to go to school." Afterwards, Stevenson warned President Kennedy's advisers about the "ugly and frightening" mood he had found in Dallas, but he did not discuss his concerns directly with Kennedy before the president's visit to Texas in late November 1963. On November 22, Stevenson was attending a luncheon held by the Chilean ambassador when he was informed that Kennedy had been shot in Dallas. He told friends and aides "That Dallas! Why, why, didn't I insist that he not go there?"

After President Kennedy was assassinated, Stevenson continued to serve in his position as ambassador to the UN under President Lyndon Johnson. As the country moved toward the 1964 presidential election, the war in Vietnam became an important campaign issue. The Republican presidential candidate, Arizona Senator Barry Goldwater, advocated victory in Vietnam—a rollback strategy that Johnson denounced as tantamount to nuclear war. Stevenson was not a major player on the Vietnam issue. He did support Johnson publicly and in private because he believed in the containment of communism, but he also wanted to start negotiations with North Vietnam through the United Nations, which Johnson rejected.

== Death and legacy ==
In July 1965, Stevenson traveled to Geneva, Switzerland, to attend the annual meeting of the United Nations Economic and Social Council. After the conference he stopped in London for several days, where he visited UK Prime Minister Harold Wilson, discussed the situation in South Vietnam with British officials, and was interviewed by CBS newsman Eric Sevareid. On the afternoon of July 14, while walking in London with his aide and girlfriend Marietta Tree to Grosvenor Square, Stevenson suffered a massive heart attack, and died later that day at age 65 of heart failure at St George's Hospital. Marietta Tree recalled:

As we were walking along the street he said do not walk quite so fast and do hold your head up Marietta. I was burrowing ahead trying to get to the park as quickly as possible and then the next thing I knew, I turned around and I saw he'd gone white, gray really, and he fell and his hand brushed me as he fell and he hit the pavement with the most terrible crack and I thought he'd fractured his skull.

That night in her diary, she wrote, "Adlai is dead. We were together." Following memorial services at the United Nations General Assembly Hall (on July 19, 1965), and in Washington, D.C.; Springfield, Illinois; and Bloomington, Illinois, Stevenson was interred in the family plot in Evergreen Cemetery, Bloomington, Illinois. The funeral in Bloomington's Unitarian Church was attended by many national figures, including President Lyndon B. Johnson, Vice President Hubert Humphrey, and Chief Justice Earl Warren.

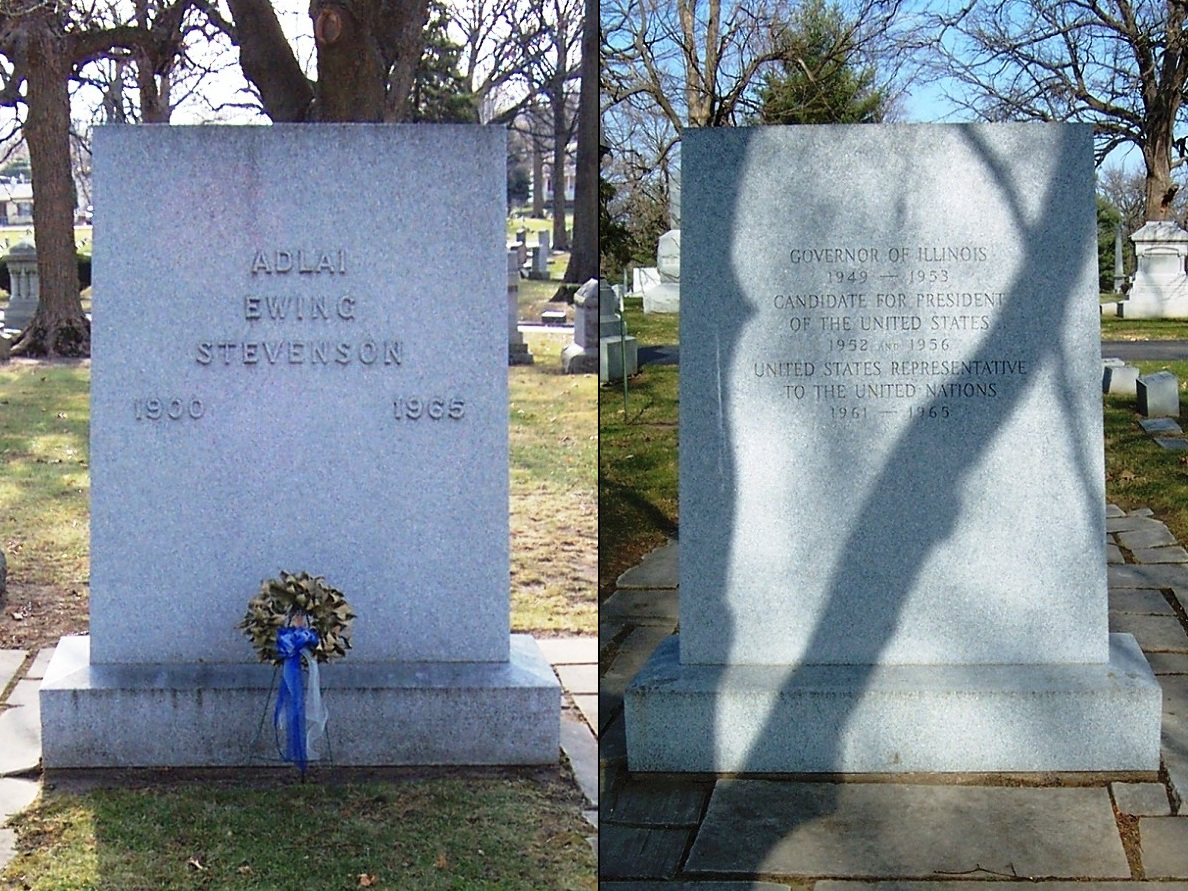
Stevenson grave in Evergreen Memorial Cemetery in Bloomington, Illinois

Historian Arthur M. Schlesinger Jr., who served as one of his speechwriters, described Stevenson as a "great creative figure in American politics. He turned the Democratic Party around in the fifties and made JFK possible...to the United States and the world he was the voice of a reasonable, civilized, and elevated America. He brought a new generation into politics, and moved millions of people in the United States and around the world."

Journalist David Halberstam wrote that "Stevenson's gift to the nation was his language, elegant and well-crafted, thoughtful and calming." His biographer Jean H. Baker stated that Stevenson's memory "still survives...as an expression of a different kind of politics – nobler, more issue-oriented, less compliant to the greedy ambitions of modern politicians, and less driven by public opinion polls and the media."

W. Willard Wirtz, his friend and law partner, once said "If the Electoral College ever gives an honorary degree, it should go to Adlai Stevenson."

Halberstam wrote of Stevenson that

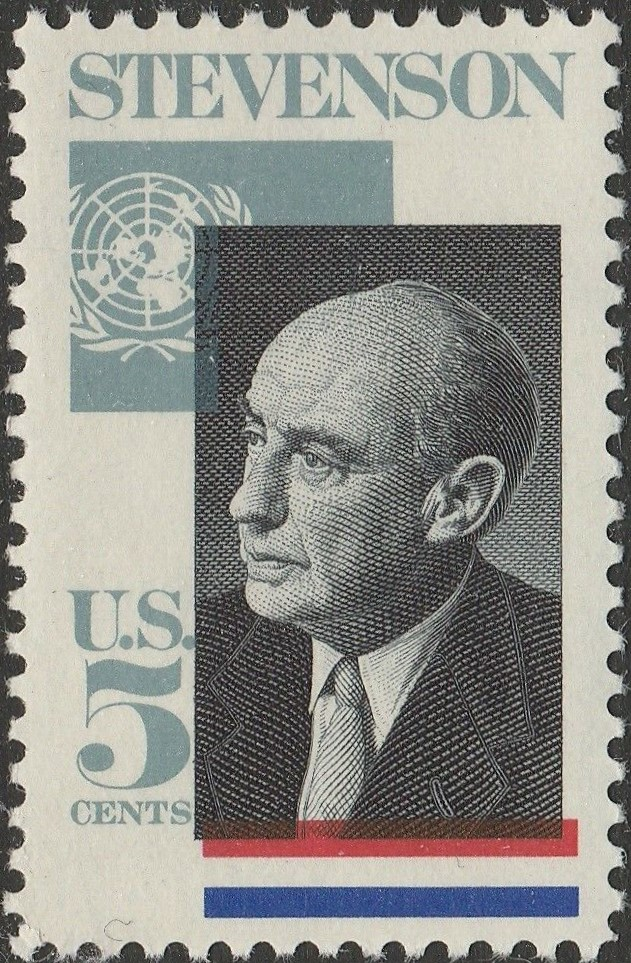
1966 U.S. postage stamp in honor of Stevenson

he had played a historic role for his party, twice its presidential candidate, the first time running against impossible odds in 1952, at the height of the Korean War and McCarthyism, with the [Democratic] party already decaying from the scandals of twenty years in power. Running against the great hero of the era, Dwight Eisenhower, Stevenson had lost, of course, but his voice had seemed special in that moment, a voice of rationality and elegance. In the process of defeat, he had helped to salvage the party, giving it a new vitality and bringing to its fold a whole new generation of educated Americans, volunteers now in the political process, some very professional amateurs who would be masterly used by the Kennedys in 1960. If John and Robert Kennedy seemed to symbolize style in politics, much of that was derived directly from Stevenson. He had, at what should have been a particularly low point for the party, managed to keep it vibrant and vital, and to involve a new kind of people in politics.

His biographer Jean H. Baker wrote of Stevenson's two presidential campaigns in 1952 and 1956 that "what would be remembered...were not his public programs and ideas for a New America but, ironically, the private man – his character and personality, his wit and charm, his efforts to negotiate and keep the peace within the Democratic Party, his elegant speeches, and the grace with which he accepted defeat."

The Central Illinois Regional Airport near Bloomington has a whimsical statue of Stevenson, sitting on a bench with his feet propped on his briefcase and his head in one hand, as if waiting for his flight. He is depicted wearing shoes that had a hole in the sole, from having walked many miles during his election campaign. The shoe had become a symbol of his campaign.

The Adlai E. Stevenson II Farm in Mettawa, Illinois, which was Stevenson's home from 1936 to 1965, is on the National Register of Historic Places and has been designated a National Historic Landmark.

Adlai Stevenson II was inducted as a Laureate of The Lincoln Academy of Illinois and awarded the Order of Lincoln (the state's highest honor) by the governor of Illinois in 1965 in the area of government.

In October 1965, the United States Post Office Department issued a 5 cent stamp in Bloomington, Illinois, to commemorate the life of Stevenson.

== Stevenson in popular culture ==
=== In film and television ===
Stevenson has been referenced in television episodes of The Simpsons in the episodes "Lisa the Iconoclast" and "The Secret War of Lisa Simpson" (appearing in the latter in an educational film, with Harry Shearer providing the cartoon Stevenson's voice. In the former, a gag occurs, as the mob of Springfielders exhume the corpse of Jedediah, Willie mistakenly throws dirt over the flame of a candle vigil set in front of Adlai's grave). He has also been referenced in The Golden Girls, Happy Days (in the January 28, 1975, episode "The Not Making of the President") and Mystery Science Theater 3000's presentation of Manos: The Hands of Fate (a Stevenson lookalike buys a car and one of the MST3K characters comments on it). Murphy Brown briefly names her newborn son 'Adlai Stevenson'. He was also mentioned in The West Wing (Arnold Vinick compares himself to Stevenson, the latter having been nominated twice to run for president)

Stevenson has also been referenced in films. Peter Sellers claimed that his portrayal of President Merkin Muffley in Dr. Strangelove was modeled on Stevenson. Stevenson's "Don't wait for the translation" speech to Russian ambassador Valerian Zorin during the Cuban Missile Crisis inspired dialogue in a courtroom scene in Star Trek VI: The Undiscovered Country. The historical speech itself is depicted in the 2000 film Thirteen Days with Michael Fairman playing Stevenson, as well as partially depicted in the 1974 television play The Missiles of October by Ralph Bellamy. Stevenson is also referenced in Wayne's World 2 ("Waynestock" is held in an Aurora, Illinois, park named for Stevenson), Plain Clothes (the high school is named for Stevenson), Annie Hall (Woody Allen's character tells a standup joke about the Stevenson-Eisenhower campaign) and Breakfast at Tiffany's. Stevenson also appears in A Global Affair credited as himself.

In Pioneer One, a crowd-financed TV series published under a Creative Commons license, one of the characters introduces himself as "Adlai Steve DiLeo", named after Adlai Stevenson, "someone who ran three times for president unsuccessfully".

In a parallel universe featured in the Sliders episode "The Return of Maggie Beckett", the German Wehrmacht breaks through the Allied lines in the Battle of the Bulge in 1944, which causes World War II to drag on until 1947. General Eisenhower is relieved as the Supreme Commander of the Allied Forces in Europe and returns to the United States in disgrace. Consequently, Stevenson becomes president. The Stevenson administration makes the Roswell UFO incident in July 1947 public knowledge and signs the Reticulan-American Free Trade Agreement (RAFTA), giving the US access to advanced Reticulan technology. This leads to a human mission to Mars in the 1990s.

In the 2016 movie Bogie and Bacall, Stevenson was portrayed by actor Ryan Paevey.

=== In other media ===
The writer Gore Vidal, who admired and supported Stevenson, based a main character in his 1960 Broadway play The Best Man on Stevenson. The play, which was nominated for six Tony Awards, centers on the contest for the presidential nomination at a fictitious political convention. One of the main contenders for the nomination is Secretary of State William Russell, a principled, liberal intellectual. The character is based on Stevenson; his main opponent is the ruthless, unscrupulous Senator Joseph Cantwell, whom Vidal modeled on Richard Nixon and the Kennedy brothers. The play was turned into a 1964 film of the same name, with actor Henry Fonda playing Russell. Fonda had been a Stevenson supporter at the 1960 Democratic National Convention.

The Avalanche: Outtakes and Extras from the Illinois Album, a 2006 album by Sufjan Stevens of songs about the state of Illinois, contains a song called "Adlai Stevenson". Stevenson's speech to the UN during the midst of the Cuban Missile Crises plays a minor but important role in Stephen King's 2011 time-travel novel 11/22/63.

== Things named after Stevenson ==
- Stevenson Expressway – Interstate 55 is known as the Adlai E. Stevenson Expressway between I-294 and US 41 (Lake Shore Drive) in Illinois
- Adlai E. Stevenson Elementary School in Fairfield, New Jersey
- Adlai E. Stevenson Elementary School in Rochester, New York
- Adlai E. Stevenson II Elementary School in Bloomington, Illinois
- Adlai E. Stevenson High School located in Lincolnshire, Illinois
- Adlai E. Stevenson High School in Sterling Heights, Michigan
- Adlai Stevenson Elementary School (formerly Junior High) in Cleveland, Ohio
- Adlai E. Stevenson High School in Livonia, Michigan
- Adlai E. Stevenson High School in the Bronx, New York City, now closed
- Adlai E. Stevenson Elementary School in Elk Grove Village, Illinois
- Adlai E. Stevenson Elementary School in Des Plaines, Illinois
- Adlai Stevenson Elementary School in the Plum Borough School District in Plum, Pennsylvania
- Adlai E. Stevenson Elementary School in Chicago, Illinois
- Stevenson Elementary School in Mountain View, California
- Adlai E. Stevenson College, a residential college at the University of California, Santa Cruz
- Stevenson Hall, a lecture building on the Illinois State University campus in Normal, Illinois
- Adlai E. Stevenson Hall, Sonoma State University in Rohnert Park, California
- Stevenson Drive, a major thoroughfare in Springfield, Illinois
- Stevenson Hall, a residence hall for students on the Northern Illinois University campus in DeKalb, Illinois
- Stevenson Hall, a residence hall for students on the Eastern Illinois University campus in Charleston, Illinois
- Adlai E. Stevenson Chair, a professorship of International Affairs at Columbia University, currently held by Robert Jervis
- Adlai Stevenson Middle School in Westland, Michigan
- Adlai E. Stevenson School, an Elementary School in Decatur, Illinois
- Adlai E. Stevenson Elementary School in Southfield, Michigan
- Stevenson Hall, a student dining facility at Princeton University
- Stevenson Center for Community and Economic Development, graduate school program at Illinois State University

== Electoral history ==
=== Gubernatorial ===
1948

1948 Illinois gubernatorial Democratic primary
Party	Candidate	Votes	%
Democratic	Adlai E. Stevenson	578,390	100
Total votes		578,390	100

1948 Illinois gubernatorial election
Party	Candidate	Votes	%
Democratic	Adlai E. Stevenson	2,250,074	57.11
Republican	Dwight H. Green (incumbent)	1,678,007	42.59
Prohibition	Willis Ray Wilson	9,491	0.24
Socialist Labor	Louis Fisher	2,673	0.07
Write-in	Others	12	0.00
Total votes		3,940,257	100

1952

1952 Illinois gubernatorial Democratic primary
Party	Candidate	Votes	%
Democratic	Adlai E. Stevenson (incumbent)	708,275	99.97
Write-in	Others	213	0.03
Total votes		708,488	100

=== Presidential ===
1952

Electoral results
Presidential candidate	Party	Home state	Popular vote		Electoral vote	Running mate		
Presidential candidate	Party	Home state	Count	Percentage	Electoral vote	Vice-presidential candidate	Home state	Electoral vote
Dwight David Eisenhower	Republican	New York	34,075,529	55.18%	442	Richard Milhous Nixon	California	442
Adlai Ewing Stevenson II	Democratic	Illinois	27,375,090	44.33%	89	John Jackson Sparkman	Alabama	89
Vincent Hallinan	Progressive	California	140,746	0.23%	0	Charlotta Amanda Spears Bass	New York	0
Stuart Hamblen	Prohibition	Texas	73,412	0.12%	0	Enoch Arden Holtwick	Illinois	0
Eric Hass	Socialist Labor	New York	30,406	0.05%	0	Stephen Emery	New York	0
Darlington Hoopes	Socialist	Pennsylvania	20,203	0.03%	0	Samuel Herman Friedman	New York	0
Douglas MacArthur	Constitution	Arkansas	17,205	0.03%	0	Harry Flood Byrd Sr.	Virginia	0
Farrell Dobbs	Socialist Workers	Minnesota	10,312	0.02%	0	Myra Tanner Weiss	California	0
Other			9,039	0.02%	—	Other		—
Total			61,751,942	100%	531			531
Needed to win					266			266

1956

Electoral results
Presidential candidate	Party	Home state	Popular vote		Electoral vote	Running mate		
Presidential candidate	Party	Home state	Count	Percentage	Electoral vote	Vice-presidential candidate	Home state	Electoral vote
Dwight David Eisenhower (Incumbent)	Republican	Pennsylvania	35,579,180	57.37%	457	Richard Milhous Nixon	California	457
Adlai Ewing Stevenson II	Democratic	Illinois	26,028,028	41.97%	73	Carey Estes Kefauver	Tennessee	73
(Unpledged electors)	(n/a)	(n/a)	196,318	0.32%	0	(n/a)	(n/a)	0
Thomas Coleman Andrews	States' Rights	Virginia	108,956	0.18%	0	Thomas Harold Werdel	California	0
Eric Hass	Socialist Labor	New York	44,300	0.07%	0	Georgia Olive Cozzini	Wisconsin	0
Enoch Arden Holtwick	Prohibition	Illinois	41,937	0.07%	0	Edwin M. Cooper	California	0
Farrell Dobbs	Socialist Workers	New York	7,797	0.01%	0	Myra Tanner Weiss	California	0
Harry Flood Byrd Sr.	States' Rights	Virginia	2,657	<0.01%	0	William Ezra Jenner	Indiana	0
Darlington Hoopes	Socialist	Pennsylvania	2,128	<0.01%	0	Samuel Herman Friedman	New York	0
Henry B. Krajewski	American Third	New Jersey	1,829	<0.01%	0	Anna Yezo	New Jersey	0
Gerald Lyman Kenneth Smith	Christian Nationalist	Michigan	8	<0.01%	0	Charles Robertson	Michigan	0
Walter Burgwyn Jones	Democratic	Alabama	—^{(a)}	—^{(a)}	1	Herman Eugene Talmadge	Georgia	1
Other			8,691	0.01%	—	Other		—
Total			62,021,328	100%	531			531
Needed to win					266			266

== Notes ==
Party political offices
Preceded by Thomas J. Courtney	Democratic nominee for Governor of Illinois; 1948, 1952 (withdrew)	Succeeded by Sherwood Dixon
Preceded by Harry S. Truman	Democratic nominee for President of the United States; 1952, 1956	Succeeded by John F. Kennedy
Political offices
Preceded by Dwight H. Green	Governor of Illinois; 1949–1953	Succeeded by William Stratton
Diplomatic posts
Preceded by James Jeremiah Wadsworth	United States Ambassador to the United Nations; 1961–1965	Succeeded by Arthur Goldberg
