= 1947 Centralia mine disaster =

Fatal coal mine explosion in Wamac, Illinois

- Location within Illinois Location within the United States
- Date: March 25, 1947
- Location: Centralia No. 5 coal mine, Washington County section of Wamac, Illinois; 38°29′46.572″N 89°8′40.2″W
- Deaths: 111

On March 25, 1947, the Centralia No. 5 coal mine exploded near the town of Centralia, Illinois, killing 111 people. The Mine Safety and Health Administration of the United States Department of Labor reported the explosion was caused when an underburdened shot or blown-out shot ignited coal dust. The US Department of Labor lists the disaster as the second worst US mining disaster since 1940 with a total of 111 men dead.

== Mine conditions ==
The mine had received numerous warnings about conditions prior to the explosion. At that time, 142 men were in the mine; 65 were killed by burns and other injuries and 45 were killed by afterdamp. Eight men were rescued, but one died from the effects of afterdamp. Only 31 miners escaped. United Mine Workers Union President John L. Lewis testified to Congress that the secretary of the Interior, Julius Krug, had ignored warnings by inspectors that coal dust had been accumulating, which can cause explosions.

== Events ==
At 3:25 a.m. on March 25, 1947, electric power to the mine stopped. Survivors testified that there was a strong blow or rush of dust for about five minutes. One miner claimed that the dust appeared to be a black powder, while a mine employee claimed that he could smell powder smoke, though he did not enter the mine until after the explosion. An Illinois government report claimed that the explosion was caused by buildup of coal powder, though could not find a catalyst. Though the catalyst was likely accidental, the buildup of coal powder was due to the governmental regulators following a "weak, ineffectual, and indifferent policy toward enforcement of state mining laws".

== In popular culture ==
American folksinger Woody Guthrie wrote and recorded a song about the Centralia mine disaster entitled The Dying Miner. Guthrie's recording of the song is now available on the Smithsonian-Folkways recording Struggle (1990). Songwriter Bucky Halker rearranged this song and recorded it for his Welcome to Labor Land CD (Revolting Records, 2002), a collection of Halker's renditions of labor songs from Illinois. Halker also recorded his version of "New Made Graves of Centralia" for his CD Don't Want Your Millions (Revolting Records, 2000). Halker based his version on an original recording of this song in the Country Music Hall of Fame, but the author and recording artist were unknown.

Along with The Dying Miner, Guthrie wrote two other songs regarding the 1947 disaster: "Waiting at the Gate" (from the perspective of a miner's son); and "Talking Centralia" (also known as "Talking Miner").
