= Daniel A. Gilbert =

American police official and politician (1889–1970)

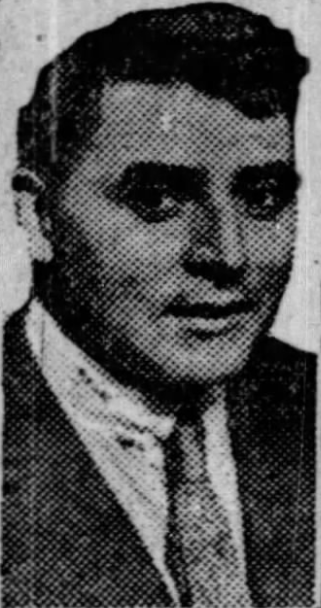
- Gilbert, c. 1920

Personal details
- Born: August 31, 1889
- Died: July 31, 1970 (aged 80) Chicago, Illinois, U.S.
- Party: Democratic
- Spouse: Elizabeth Courtney
- Children: 1

Daniel A. Gilbert (August 31, 1889 – July 31, 1970) was an American police officer and politician who was active in Cook County, Illinois's law enforcement from 1917 to 1950. He was referred to as the world's richest police officer due to his net worth of $360,000. He unsuccessfully ran for Cook County Sheriff with the Democratic nomination in 1950.

Entering the workforce at age 11, Gilbert was elected secretary-treasurer for his local affiliate of the Baggage and Parcel Delivery Drivers Union and later controlled multiple Teamsters locals. He became a police officer for the Chicago Police Department in 1917, and rose to captain by 1926. State's Attorney Thomas J. Courtney selected him to serve as chief investigator in 1932, and Gilbert held the position, with a brief interruption in 1935, until his resignation in 1950.

Jacob Arvey had the Democratic nomination for sheriff given to Gilbert in 1950, despite opposition from U.S. Senators Scott W. Lucas and Paul Douglas. Gilbert's testimony before the Kefauver Committee was leaked and Gilbert's defeat was blamed for other Democratic losses on the ballot, including that of Lucas.

== Early life ==
Daniel Gilbert was born on August 31, 1889, and was the oldest of eight children. He was given the nickname "Tubbo" due to his large size. He married Elizabeth Courtney, with whom he had one child.

At age 11 Gilbert claimed to be 14 so that he could become a wagon boy for Marshall Field's and became a member of Local 725 of the Baggage and Parcel Delivery Drivers Union. He was elected secretary-treasurer of Local 725 in 1913, defeating incumbent Henry L. Deike, who was shot during the campaign. The police questioned Gilbert, M.J. Ross (the president of the union), and Charles Applequist, but they were exonerated. Journalist George William Bliss stated that Gilbert controlled seven International Brotherhood of Teamsters locals by 1938 and that union leaders reported directly to him.

== Law enforcement ==
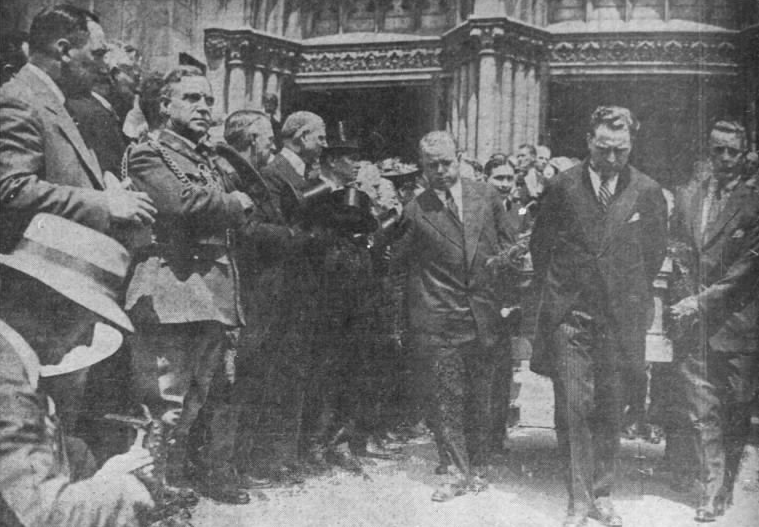
The funeral procession of George E. Brennan, with Gilbert as one of the pallbearers.

Gilbert was made supervisor of division 5 of the Chicago Police Department in 1932.

Gilbert applied to be a police driver for the Chicago Police Department in 1912, and listed his birthdate as August 31, 1885, due to the minimum age requirement of 24. He gave his actual birthdate when he applied again in 1914, but his first submission remained his officially recognized birthdate. In 1948, he successfully sued to have it officially changed to 1889 to avoid a forced retirement. Gilbert became a police officer on April 6, 1917, and was promoted to sergeant on May 6, 1922, lieutenant on August 2, 1924, and captain on January 25, 1926. In May 1920, Gilbert and W.H. Beehan arrested 12 people and recovered $12,050 (equivalent to $193,661 in 2025) worth of property, the most for both categories that month in Chicago. From 1931 to December 5, 1932, he served as a supervising captain.

Political boss George E. Brennan was a friend of Gilbert and he was a pallbearer at Brennan's funeral in 1928.

Commissioner James P. Allman reorganized the police department on July 30, 1932. The uniformed division was separated and divided into six division, each with its own supervisor, across Chicago. Gilbert was made supervisor of the 5th division.

State's Attorney Thomas J. Courtney selected Gilbert to replace chief investigator Pat Roche starting December 5, 1932. Commissioner James P. Allman appointed Gilbert to replace Ira J. McDowell as head of the uniformed division on Chicago police department on April 4, 1935, making him one of the highest-ranking officials. However, Gilbert returned to his position as chief investigator on July 13. Gilbert was the head of the police investigation into the kidnapping of John Factor's son, for which Roger Touhy claimed that he was "railroaded" by Gilbert, and the manhunt for John Dillinger occurred during his tenure.

In 1940, Oscar Nelson, the Republican nominee for Cook County State's Attorney, claimed that Gilbert met with organized crime figure Frank Nitti in Hot Springs, Arkansas, the previous year and played golf on a daily basis; Gilbert denied the allegations.

=== Legal affairs and wealth ===
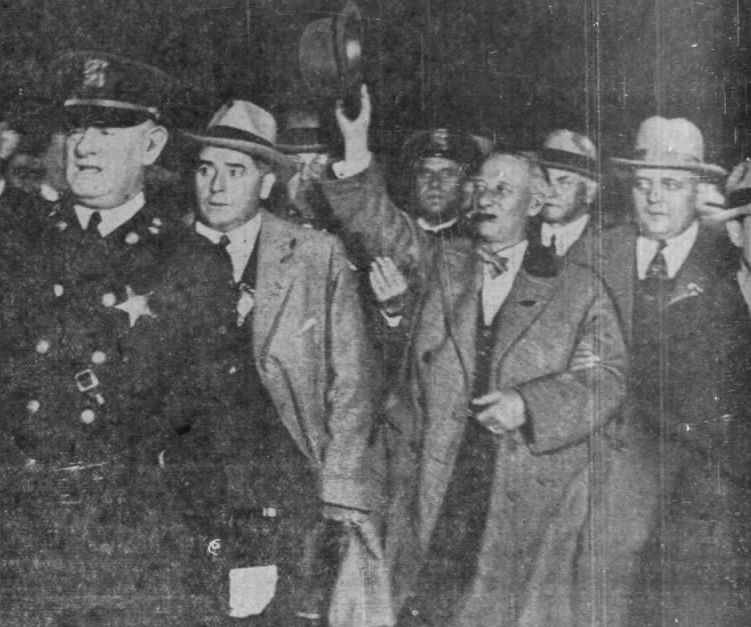
Gilbert and other officers escorting Al Smith in 1928.

Newspapers referred to Gilbert as the world's richest police officer. His salary as chief investigator for the Cook County state's attorney was $9,000 (equivalent to $168,750 in 2025) per year. Gilbert claimed to have received his first stock tip in 1921, and his net worth rose to $98,000 by 1929 (equivalent to $1,837,500 in 2025), but fell to $15,000 (equivalent to $281,250 in 2025) after the Wall Street crash of 1929. A report conducted during Clinton Anderson's tenure as United States Secretary of Agriculture showed that Gilbert was profiting from grain market speculation. Gilbert claimed to have earned $10,000-12,000 from gambling in 1936.

On November 15, 1938, Gilbert was among 63 people and 34 companies indicted for violating the Sherman Antitrust Act by conspiring to fix the prices and create an artificial scarcity in the ice cream and milk industries. Gilbert pled not guilty and the charges against 43 people and 14 corporations were dismissed on July 13, 1939, by Judge Charles Edgar Woodward. The charges against the remaining people and companies were dismissed on September 16, 1940.

Theodore Dalpe filed a $50,000 (equivalent to $1,157,297 in 2025) lawsuit against Gilbert, John R. McWhorter, and six investigators on November 21, 1939, claiming that the defendants had assaulted and detained him without probable cause from January 28 to February 1, 1938. Dalpe had been convicted on April 4, 1938, for receiving stolen property, but the Supreme Court of Illinois reversed the decision on June 30, 1938. Dalpe's wife Bernice filed an additional $50,000 lawsuit against the same defendants on January 25, 1940, claiming their furs and jewelry were illegally seized and that she was beaten and held for 12 hours without food. On November 5, 1941, a jury awarded Dalpe $1 for the charges against McWhorter, but the other defendants were found not guilty. The defendants for Bernice Dalpe's lawsuit were found not guilty on June 24, 1943.

In October 1940, Elmer Williams's magazine Lightnin' published an article which accused Gilbert of being a part of an organization stealing fur clothing. The state of Illinois filed rarely-used criminal libel charges against Williams. Gilbert was cross-examined for hours during the trial. Williams was acquitted on June 6, 1941, after the jury deliberated for 20 minutes.

== 1950 sheriff election ==
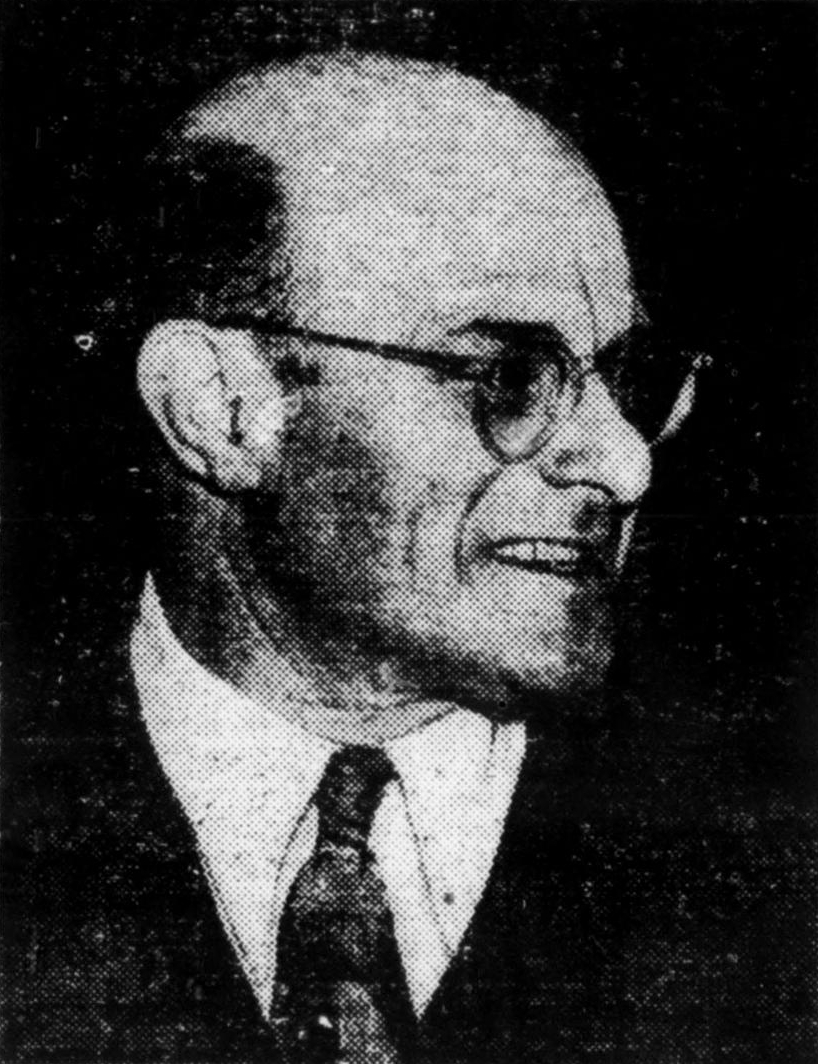
Political boss Jacob Arvey pushed for Gilbert's nomination as Cook County Sheriff.

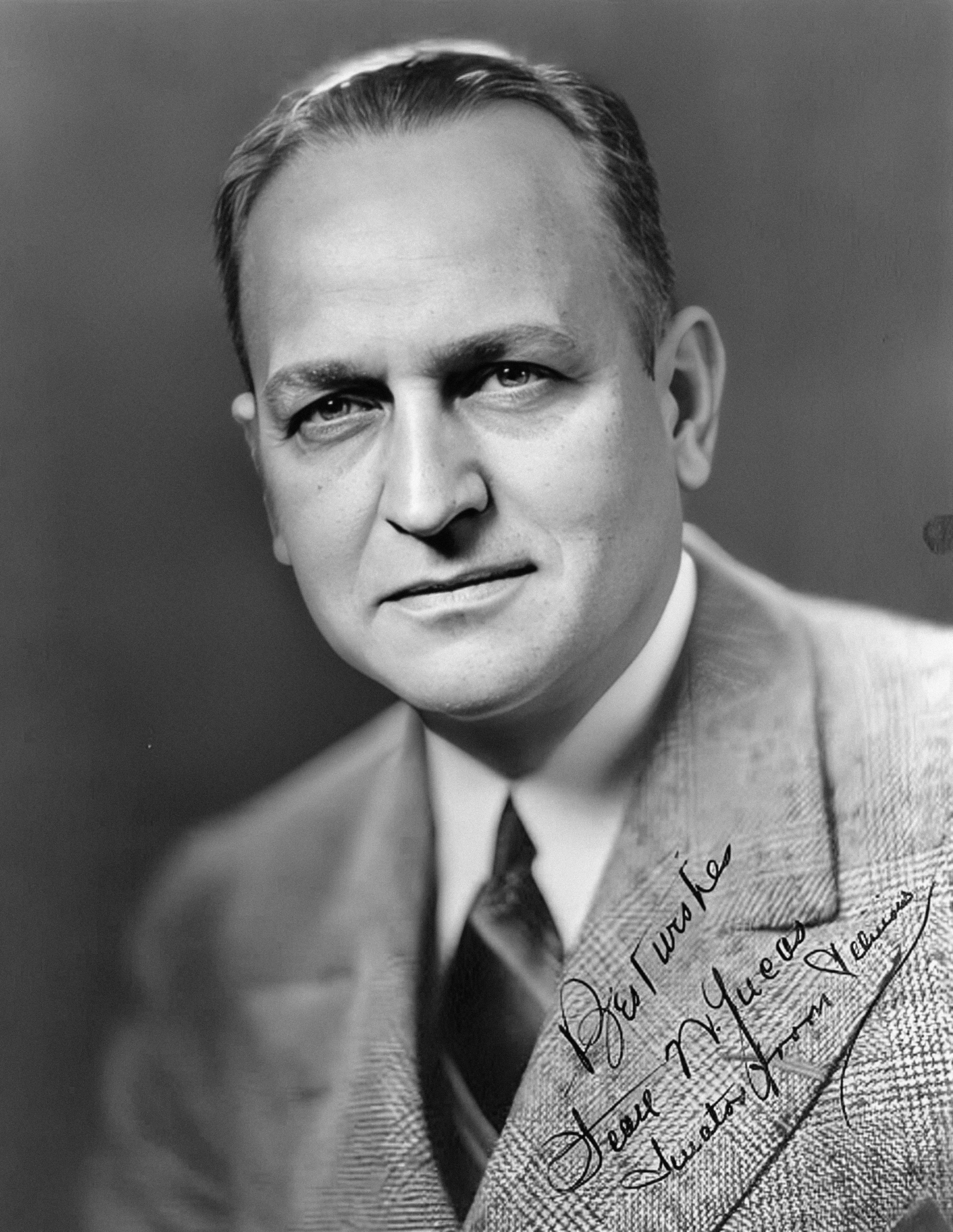
Gilbert's defeat was blamed for causing Scott W. Lucas to lose in the concurrent U.S. Senate election.

In 1950, Democratic boss Jacob Arvey had the Democratic nomination for Cook County Sheriff given to Gilbert and later stated that he blundered by doing that. U.S. Senators Scott W. Lucas and Paul Douglas opposed his nomination; according to Lucas, Douglas attempted to persuade the Cook County political machine to select somebody other than Gilbert. On January 19, 1950, Gilbert was given a year's leave of absence as police regulations prohibited police officers from taking part in political campaigns. Gilbert was in California from August to September 13, as he was attempting to recover from hay fever.

The Republicans initially nominated J. Malachy Coughlan, but selected John E. Babb after Coughlan died on August 25, 1950. The Chicago Crime Commission offered to host a televised debate between the two candidates, which Babb accepted, but Gilbert declined. Higher on the ballot, Lucas declined to debate Everett Dirksen, his Republican opponent. The two candidates met for a radio broadcast moderated by Kermit Eby on November 5.

Vice President Alben W. Barkley endorsed Gilbert, but Douglas refused to campaign for him and the Chicago Sun-Times, which usually endorsed Democrats, endorsed Babb instead. Arvey was concerned by the lack of newspaper support for Gilbert. Gilbert spent $45,000 (equivalent to $602,178 in 2025) of his own money putting up billboards.

During Gilbert's testimony at Estes Kefauver's committee in 1950, he estimated his own net worth at $360,000 (equivalent to $4,817,427 in 2025), claiming that it was due to investment tips from friends and sports and election gambling. He admitted during the hearing that his gambling activities were not legal stating "Well, no. No, it is not legal. No." when asked by Rudolph Halley. Journalist Ray Brennan was able to gain access to the confidential transcripts of the committee hearing after posing as an office manager. A story on Gilbert's testimony was published by the Chicago Sun-Times on November 2.

A July 1941 sheet showing $24,480 (equivalent to $535,846 in 2025) in bribery payouts by the gambling syndicate managed by Jake Guzik, Murray Humphreys, Nitti, and Edward David Vogel listed $4,000 going to an individual named "Tub". Gilbert's political opponents attacked him, citing the closeness of Tub and his nickname Tubbo. Babb also attacked him for the 1,038 unsolved murders in Cook County.

Gilbert's defeat was alleged to have caused other Democratic candidates to have lost due to voters using straight ballot tickets. Lucas lost reelection in the concurrent U.S. Senate election and the Republicans gained control of the Sanitary District. Arvey stated that Gilbert's defeat had affected other Democratic candidates and retired as chair of the Cook County Democratic Party. This was the only time that Gilbert ran for elected office.

== Later life ==
Gilbert resigned as chief investigator a day after losing the sheriff election and retired from the police department a few days later. He received a job as security chief at Arlington Park, which was owned by Democratic-aligned businessman Benjamin F. Lindheimer. His brother, Maurice Gilbert, held the same position since 1948, while on leave from the Chicago Police Department due to bad health and business reasons.

Gilbert was injured on February 9, 1960, after a tree fell on his golf cart while he was golfing in Palm Springs, California. He suffered a heart attack in July 1963 and was hospitalized at Wesley Memorial Hospital in July 1964. His wife was made conservator of his estate in November. He died on July 31, 1970, at Wesley Memorial Hospital. His funeral was attended by Arvey, Richard J. Daley, and Joseph D. Keenan.

== Works cited ==
=== Books ===
- Barnhart, Bill (1999). Kerner: The Conflict of Intangible Rights. University of Illinois Press. ISBN 0252025040.
- Kefauver, Estes (1951). Crime in America. Greenwood Publishing Group.
- Merriner, James (2004). Grafters and Goo Goos: Corruption and Reform in Chicago, 1833-2003. Southern Illinois University Press. ISBN 0809325713.
- Peterson, Virgil (1952). Barbarians in Our Midst: A History of Chicago Crime and Politics. Atlantic Monthly Press.

=== Journal ===
- Deason, Brian (2002). "Scott Lucas, Everett Dirksen, and the 1950 Senate Election in Illinois". Journal of the Illinois State Historical Society. 95 (1). University of Illinois Press: 31–51. JSTOR 40193486.

=== Newspapers ===
- "2 Sheriff Rivals Quit Scene For Health Reasons". Chicago Tribune. August 8, 1950. p. 10 – via Newspapers.com.
- "250 Attend Services For Daniel Gilbert". Chicago Tribune. August 2, 1970. p. Part 1: Page 7 – via Newspapers.com.
- "51 Patrolmen Promoted To Be Sergeants". Chicago Tribune. May 7, 1922. p. Part 1: Page 12 – via Newspapers.com.
- "Babb Declares Gilbert Proves Own Unfitness". Chicago Tribune. November 3, 1950. p. 11 – via Newspapers.com.
- "Babb Knocks Richest Cop From Office". Daily Chronicle. November 8, 1950. p. 1 – via Newspapers.com.
- "Capt. Gilbert And Aids Freed In Arrest Suit". Chicago Tribune. November 6, 1941. p. 13 – via Newspapers.com.
- "Capt. Gilbert Calls Nelson's Charges 'Lies'". Chicago Tribune. September 27, 1940. p. 1 – via Newspapers.com.
- "Capt. Gilbert Finally Gets In and Finds His Birthday!". Chicago Tribune. September 1, 1936. p. 12 – via Newspapers.com.
- "Capt. Gilbert Wins In Fight On Retirement". Chicago Tribune. December 31, 1948. p. 8 – via Newspapers.com.
- "Chicago Paper Makes Change to Back Babb". Daily Chronicle. October 9, 1950. p. 3 – via Newspapers.com.
- "'Dago Frank,' King of Levee, Shot By Detective In Raid". Chicago Inter Ocean. December 26, 1913. p. 3 – via Newspapers.com.
- "Dan A. Gilbert Dies; 'World's Richest Cop'". Chicago Tribune. August 2, 1970. p. 18 – via Newspapers.com.
- "Daniel Gilbert Gravely Ill In Hospital". Chicago Tribune. July 30, 1964. p. Section 1A: Page 15 – via Newspapers.com.
- "Dan Gilbert Hurts As Tree Topples On His Golf Cart". Chicago Tribune. February 10, 1960. p. Part 2: Page 10 – via Newspapers.com.
- "Dan Gilbert's Role In Union Warfare Told". Chicago Tribune. August 11, 1954. p. 4 – via Newspapers.com.
- "Dan Gilbert's Wife Is Named Conservator". Chicago Tribune. November 26, 1964. p. Section 1A: Page 4 – via Newspapers.com.
- "Defense Seeks Settlement In Federal Court". The Daily Sentinel. December 9, 1938. p. 1 – via Newspapers.com.
- "Democrats In Cook Seek Help For Candidate". The Rock Island Argus. October 14, 1950. p. 22 – via Newspapers.com.
- "Democrats Says He Put Up Most Of It Himself". Chicago Tribune. October 26, 1950. p. Part 2: Page 1 – via Newspapers.com.
- "Dillinger Is At Large Yet". Daily Republican-Register. March 5, 1934. p. 1 – via Newspapers.com.
- "Drives To Home As His Father Pursues Hunt". Chicago Tribune. April 21, 1933. p. 1 – via Newspapers.com.
- "Exonerated". The Day Book. December 30, 1913. p. 6 – via Newspapers.com.
- "Furrier Files $50,000 Suit Against Police". The Daily Sentinel. November 22, 1939. p. 1 – via Newspapers.com.
- "Gilbert". Chicago Tribune. April 14, 1983. p. Section 2: Page 18 – via Newspapers.com.
- "Gilbert Given Year Leave To Run For Sheriff". Chicago Tribune. January 19, 1950. p. Part 1: Page 14 – via Newspapers.com.
- "Gilbert In, Roche Out". Chicago Eagle. December 3, 1932. p. 4 – via Newspapers.com.
- "Gilbert Reassigned To Courtney Staff As Chief Investigator". Chicago Tribune. July 14, 1935. p. 2 – via Newspapers.com.
- "Gilbert Second in Command of All City Police". Chicago Tribune. April 5, 1935. p. 1 – via Newspapers.com.
- "Gilbert To Push War On Crime As No. 2 Police Chief". Chicago Tribune. April 6, 1935. p. 4 – via Newspapers.com.
- "Indicted In Federal Milk Investigation". The Daily Sentinel. November 15, 1938. p. 1 – via Newspapers.com.
- "List of Accused in Milk Indictments". Chicago Tribune. November 16, 1938. p. 6 – via Newspapers.com.
- "Map Indictment Of Nitti For Bar Union "Capture"". Chicago Tribune. September 29, 1940. p. Part 1: Page 17 – via Newspapers.com.
- "Marriage Licenses". Chicago Inter Ocean. May 28, 1909. p. 10 – via Newspapers.com.
- "Milk Industry Enjoined From Setting Prices". The Rock Island Argus. September 16, 1940. p. 7 – via Newspapers.com.
- "Milk Monopoly Fight Headed For Supreme Court". Chicago Tribune. July 14, 1939. p. 3 – via Newspapers.com.
- "Minister-Editor Opens Criminal Libel Defense". Chicago Tribune. June 4, 1941. p. 18 – via Newspapers.com.
- "Move To Make Gilbert Police Chief Fought". Chicago Tribune. January 22, 1949. p. 2 – via Newspapers.com.
- "New Setup Of Police Force". Chicago Tribune. July 31, 1932. p. 10 – via Newspapers.com.
- "Pastor-Editor Freed By Jury On Libel Charge". Chicago Tribune. June 7, 1941. p. 18 – via Newspapers.com.
- "Police System Reorganized; Pick 8 Chiefs". Chicago Tribune. July 31, 1932. p. 1 – via Newspapers.com.
- "Question Three in Deike Case". Chicago Tribune. December 30, 1913. p. 14 – via Newspapers.com.
- "Rivals Babb and Gilbert Meet on Radio Program - How to Vote Republican on Voting Machine". Chicago Tribune. November 6, 1950. p. Part 4: Page 8 – via Newspapers.com.
- "Ruling Is To Be Appealed To Supreme Court". The Times. July 13, 1939. p. 1 – via Newspapers.com.
- "Six Acquitted On Charges Of False Arrests". Chicago Tribune. June 25, 1943. p. 5 – via Newspapers.com.
- "Smith Plans To Attend Funeral". The Dispatch. August 9, 1928. p. 1 – via Newspapers.com.
- "Start Criminal Libel Trial of Minister-Editor". Chicago Tribune. June 3, 1941. p. 15 – via Newspapers.com.
- "Sues Police". Chicago Tribune. January 26, 1940. p. 10 – via Newspapers.com.
- "Touhy Says He Should Be Freed". Belleville News-Democrat. November 21, 1957. p. 12 – via Newspapers.com.
- "Trappers". Chicago Tribune. June 2, 1920. p. 10 – via Newspapers.com.
- Doherty, James (September 15, 1950). "Grill Sheriff, Too, Gilbert's Backers Urge". Chicago Tribune. p. Part 2: Page 1 – via Newspapers.com.
- Morrow, Thomas (November 3, 1950). "Barkley Backs All Democrats - Even Gilbert". Chicago Tribune. p. 17 – via Newspapers.com.
- Tagge, George (November 1, 1950). "$4,000 Question Put To Gilbert By Rival, Babb". Chicago Tribune. p. 25 – via Newspapers.com.
- Tagge, George (October 10, 1950). "Crime Foe Ask Babb, Gilbert Debate On Video". Chicago Tribune. p. 9 – via Newspapers.com.
- Tagge, George (October 11, 1950). "Gilbert Turns Down Debate On TV With Babb". Chicago Tribune. p. 11 – via Newspapers.com.

=== Web ===
- "The Press: The Big Story". Time. September 22, 1952. Archived from the original on March 1, 2025.
- Grossman, Ron (May 12, 2019). "Who was Chicago's Dan Gilbert? 'The world's richest cop'". Chicago Tribune. Archived from the original on March 1, 2025.
