= Roger Touhy, Gangster =

1944 film by Robert Florey

- Directed by: Robert Florey
- Written by: Jerome Cody; Crane Wilbur
- Produced by: Lee S. Marcus
- Cinematography: Glen MacWilliams
- Edited by: Harry Reynolds
- Music by: Hugo Friedhofer
- Distributed by: 20th Century Fox
- Release date: July 1944
- Running time: 65 min.
- Country: United States
- Language: English

Roger Touhy, Gangster is a 1944 American gangster film based on the life of Chicago mob figure Roger Touhy, directed by film noir specialist Robert Florey.

Parts of the film were shot at Stateville Correctional Center near Joliet, Illinois, where Touhy himself was serving time. Although the story was fictionalized, Touhy successfully sued the studio for defamation of character. After six years, he won a judgment of $15,000, although Fox was able to profitably distribute the film overseas without legal repercussions.

== Cast ==
- Preston Foster as Roger Touhy
- Victor McLaglen as Herman 'Owl' Banghart
- Lois Andrews as Daisy
- Kent Taylor as Captain Steve Warren
- Anthony Quinn as George Carroll
- William Post Jr. as Joseph P. Sutton
- Harry Morgan as Thomas J. 'Smoke' Reardon
- Matt Briggs as Cameron
- Moroni Olsen as Riley
- Reed Hadley as FBI Agent
- Trudy Marshall as Sutton's escort
- John Archer as FBI Agent
- Frank Jenks as Bernard O'Connor
- George E. Stone as Icebox Hamilton
- Charles Lang as FBI Agent
