= Jacob Arvey =

American politician (1895–1977)

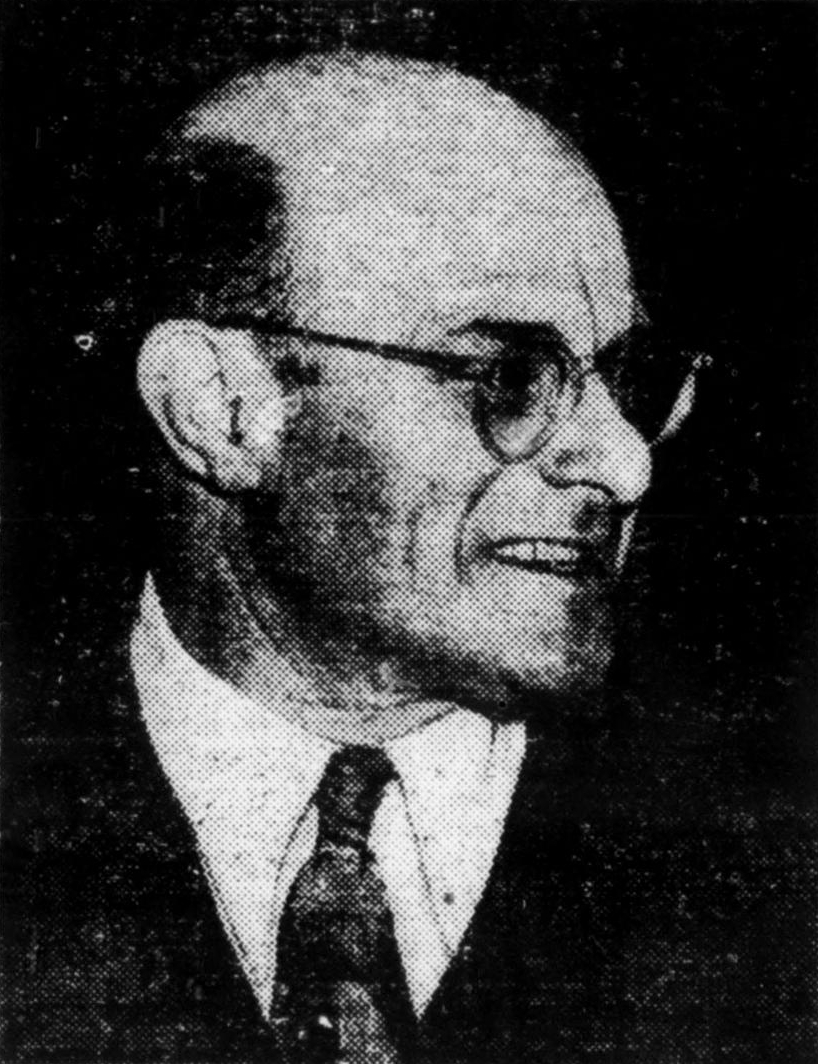
- Arvey c. 1952

Member of the Democratic National Committee from Illinois
- In office 1950–1972
- Preceded by: Edward Joseph Kelly

Personal details
- Born: November 3, 1895 Chicago, Illinois
- Died: August 25, 1977 (aged 81) Chicago, Illinois
- Party: Democratic

Military service
- Allegiance: United States
- Branch/service: United States Army
- Rank: Colonel
- Unit: 33rd Infantry Division

Jacob M. Arvey (November 3, 1895 – August 25, 1977) was an influential Chicago political leader from the Depression era until the mid-1950s. He may be best known for his efforts to end corruption in the Chicago Democratic organization, and for promoting the candidacies of liberal Democratic politicians such as Adlai Stevenson and Senator Paul Douglas of Illinois. He was known as "Jake" and "Jack" at different times in his career.

== Early life and political career ==
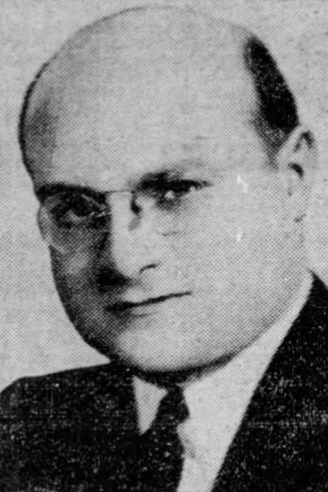
Arvey c. 1929

Arvey was the son of Israel and Bertha (née Eisenberg) Arvey, poor Jewish emigrants from Russia. He grew up in Chicago's 24th political ward in the North Lawndale neighborhood on the city's West Side. Arvey never attended college, but did study law, served as a clerk in a Chicago law firm, and eventually passed the Illinois bar exam and became an attorney. On June 11, 1916 he married Edith Freeman; they would remain married until his death in 1977. They had three children: Erwin, Helen and Howard Arvey.

In 1923 Arvey was elected to the Chicago city council from his native 24th ward. Known as "Jake" Arvey, he was the third-ranking member of the powerful political machine led by Chicago Mayor Ed Kelly. A superb political organizer, his organization consistently turned out the largest Democratic majorities (often nine-to-one) of any ward in Chicago, thus enhancing his influence and reputation among the city's Democrats. Reflecting on the qualifications he required for someone to serve in his organization, Arvey once commented that

Every man had to belong to a church, a lodge, some other group. He had to be active in the Elks, masons, K of C, places where he could spread the word about the Democratic Party ... if an apartment was vacant and you moved in, the precinct captain was there to welcome you. He'd get the electricity turned on, perhaps get milk for your children; he'd help with your tax problems. Our organization is geared to the masses, our candidates depend on the precinct captain and our captains are trained to go into the home and make personal contact with the voter.

During World War II Arvey temporarily left his political career to serve as a colonel in the U.S. Army; he was the judge advocate of the 33rd Infantry Division, Illinois' National Guard unit, in the Pacific theater of the war.

== Leader of the organization ==
When Arvey returned from the war in 1945 he was appointed commissioner of the Chicago Park District, and served until 1967. From 1946 to 1950 was also the chairman of the Cook County Democratic Party. Now known as "Colonel" or "Jack" Arvey, he found that the Chicago Democratic organization was in trouble due to numerous scandals and charges of corruption. To improve the organization's reputation and its electoral chances, Arvey began promoting the candidacies of reformers and liberals; he also made a serious effort to clean up the city's politics. He forced Chicago Mayor Edward Joseph Kelly, his former boss and mentor, to retire as mayor when a voter revolt appeared; Arvey instead promoted and helped elect as mayor a prominent businessman, Martin Kennelly.

In 1948, Arvey had the Chicago Democratic organization nominate Adlai Stevenson II, grandson of U.S Vice President Adlai E. Stevenson, for Governor of Illinois and Paul Douglas, a professor of economics at the University of Chicago, for U.S. Senator. Both men were well-educated liberals whom Arvey felt would improve the image of the party and attract many independents and moderate Republicans. To improve their chances of winning Arvey joined with several other prominent Democrats, such as Florida Senator Claude Pepper and New Jersey party leader Frank Hague, to try to prevent incumbent President Harry S. Truman from winning the Democratic presidential nomination. Truman was trailing the GOP presidential candidate, Thomas E. Dewey, in the polls, and Arvey feared that Truman would lose by a wide margin in Illinois and drag Stevenson and Douglas to defeat with him. Arvey and his allies promoted the candidacy of General Dwight D. Eisenhower, but the plan failed when Eisenhower refused to run (in 1952 he revealed that he was a Republican and won the GOP nomination). Arvey reluctantly agreed to support Truman for the nomination. However, in a major upset Truman won Illinois – and the election – by a narrow margin. Both Stevenson and Douglas won their respective elections by landslide margins – Stevenson defeated his GOP opponent, incumbent Governor Dwight Green, by 572,000 votes.

During his years as governor Stevenson formed an effective working partnership with Arvey. Stevenson agreed to appoint qualified Democratic Party loyalists and workers to lesser positions in the state government; in return Arvey agreed to support Stevenson's efforts to reform the state government, and in particular to end corruption in the Illinois state police by removing political considerations from hiring practices.

== Political decline ==
During the 1950 general election, Daniel A. Gilbert, the candidate for Cook County Sheriff was called to testify in front of the United States Senate Special Committee to Investigate Crime in Interstate Commerce led by Senator Estes Kefauver. The transcript of the secret hearing was leaked to the Chicago Sun-Times and the scandal tanked the Democratic ticket. Arvey then resigned under pressure from the county chairmanship, although he remained active in politics.

From 1950 to 1972 Arvey was a member of the Democratic National Committee for Illinois, a prominent if not powerful role. Arvey played a role in securing the 1952 Democratic presidential nomination for Stevenson. However, as a presidential candidate Stevenson increasingly ignored Arvey and other professional Democratic politicians in favor of reformers and liberals in the party. In 1955, Richard J. Daley, an Arvey protégé, was elected Mayor of Chicago. He allowed Arvey to retain his positions on the Park District Board and the Democratic National Committee for a time, but Arvey's influence was limited. As a result of the McGovern Commission, the Committeeman and Committeewoman positions were replaced by an expanded group of members. Mayor Daley's perception that Arvey failed to prevent McGovern Commission reforms that Daley viewed unfavorably continued the falling out between Arvey and Daley and Arvey was not retained as an Illinois member of the Democratic National Committee.

== Death ==
Jacob Arvey died of heart failure in Chicago's Weiss Memorial Hospital on August 25, 1977, aged 81 and was buried in Chicago. He was survived by his wife and their three children.

== Sources ==
- An obituary article written after Arvey's death in 1977.
- An account of Arvey's political career from The Political Graveyard website.
