= Roger Touhy =

Irish American mob boss (1898–1959)

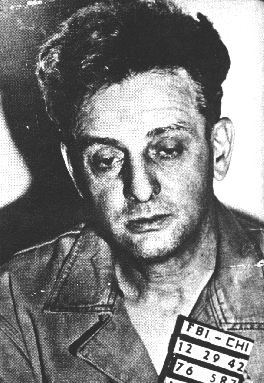
- 1942 FBI mugshot of Touhy
- Born: September 18, 1898; Chicago, Illinois, U.S.
- Died: December 16, 1959 (aged 61); Chicago, Illinois, U.S.
- Cause of death: Gunshot wounds
- Occupations: Gangster and racketeer
- Spouse: Clara Catherine Touhy (m. 1922)
- Children: 2
- Status: Deceased
- Criminal charges: Kidnapping
- Penalty: Imprisonment from 1934 to 1959

Roger Touhy (September 18, 1898 – December 16, 1959) was an Irish American mob boss and prohibition-era Chicago bootlegger. He is remembered for having been framed by his rivals in Chicago organized crime for the fake 1933 kidnapping of Jewish-American organized crime figure and Chicago Outfit associate John "Jake the Barber" Factor, a brother of cosmetics manufacturer Max Factor Sr.

Despite numerous appeals and at least one federal court ruling freeing him, Touhy spent 26 years in prison until he was finally exonerated and released in November 1959. In retaliation for filing a lawsuit against acting boss Tony Accardo and other senior Mafiosi, Touhy was murdered in an alleged contract killing by the Chicago Outfit less than a month after his release.

== Early life and career ==
=== Early years ===
Touhy was born on September 18, 1898, (Note: At least one source places his date of birth in 1896.) at 822 S. Robey Street in Chicago, Illinois, to James A. Touhy and his wife, Mary (née Moroghan). James was an immigrant from County Sligo, Ireland. Roger was one of eight children, the youngest of six boys, with an older sister and a younger sister. Rare for the Chicago Police Department at that time, Patrolman James Touhy was known to be fiercely honest and incorruptible, but he was also a strict disciplinarian who beat his children so severely that his neighbors complained. Mary Touhy was a devout Catholic who required her children to attend Mass with her.

The Touhy family lived near Polk Street and South Damen Avenue on Chicago's Near West Side. Roger initially attended local public school in Chicago. In 1908, Mary Touhy died after a stove in the kitchen exploded and caused a fire, after which James Touhy moved his family to Downers Grove, Illinois. (Note: The date of this move is not clear. Gladys Erickson says it happened in 1913, and that Touhy completed school in Downers Grove. He would have been 15 in 1913, but Erickson says he was just 13. Jay Nash, however, dates the move to 1908.) The family was Roman Catholic, and Touhy was an altar boy at their church. He attended St. Joseph Catholic School in Downers Grove, graduating from the sixth grade as valedictorian of his class. (Note: Daniel Stout, however, says Touhy dropped out of school at the age of 13 before graduating. MacNee and Hoehner, however, say he graduated but that the year was 1911.)

All but one of Roger's brothers were engaged in criminal activity. James Touhy Jr. was shot and killed by a police officer during an armed robbery in 1917. John Touhy was killed by members of the Chicago Outfit, then led by Al Capone, in 1927 while engaged in bootlegging. Joe Touhy was killed by Victor Willert, a roadhouse owner, in 1929 after Touhy threatened his life for refusing to buy moonshine from the gang. Tommy "The Terrible" Touhy served six of a 12-year sentence at Indiana State Prison for robbing the L.S. Ayres & Co. department store in Indianapolis in 1924. Paroled in 1930, he served 11 of a 23-year sentence for stealing $78,000 ($1.94 million in 2025 dollars) from a U.S. Mail shipment at a Milwaukee, Wisconsin train station on January 3, 1933. Only Eddie Touhy, a bartender, seemed to steer clear of crime. (Note: Eddie Touhy died in 1945. At the time of Roger Touhy's death, Tommy was partially crippled and living in Arizona.)

=== Legitimate employment ===
Roger began working full-time for a living at the age of 13. His ham radio hobby enabled him to get a job as a telegrapher with Western Union, and he proved so adept that he was soon made manager of the small office where he worked. He was fired in 1915 for expressing support for unionization efforts. Touhy says he spent some time as a union organizer for the Commercial Telegraphers Union of America, but felt the job had no security. He joined the Order of Railroad Telegraphers, which qualified him for a well-paying railroad job. He obtained a position with the Denver and Rio Grande Railroad and moved to Colorado.

The United States entered World War I on April 6, 1917, and Touhy enlisted in the United States Navy in 1918. Touhy did not see combat; rather, the Navy assigned him to a teaching post at Harvard University near Boston, Massachusetts. The college had lent the Navy classroom space, and Touhy taught officers Morse code. For the rest of his life, Touhy tried to impress people by claiming he taught at Harvard.

After leaving the Navy, Touhy traveled to Oklahoma with a friend from the Navy. He paid a petroleum engineer a bottle of bootleg corn whiskey to spend a few hours teaching him the fundamentals of petroleum engineering. (Note: Oklahoma had adopted the prohibition of alcohol when it became a state in 1907, and remained a "dry" state until 1959.) Touhy bluffed his way into a petroleum engineering job, paying the drilling rig and well mechanics in corn whiskey to do his job. Saving $1,000 ($18,600 in 2025 dollars), he began speculating in oil leases with his Navy friend. After about a year in Oklahoma, Touhy had made $25,000 ($500,000 in 2025 dollars). He returned to Chicago, and on April 22, 1922, he married a 23-year-old telegraph operator, Clara, whom he had met seven years earlier while working for Western Union.

== Criminal involvement ==
Touhy's initial employment after his marriage was legitimate, and included being a successful automobile salesman by day and a taxicab driver by night. He made $50,000 ($900,000 in 2025 dollars) a year selling cars. In 1927, Touhy formed a legitimate trucking firm with his brothers Eddie and Tommy. Touhy's first son, Roger Scott Touhy, was born in 1927 as well. The same year, Touhy moved his family to Des Plaines, Illinois, a suburb of Chicago. Des Plaines was still quite a rural area, and the family lived in a large home on a farm on River Road just north of Maryville Academy.

=== The Touhy-Kolb bootleg empire ===
According to Touhy, he began to bootleg immediately after founding his trucking firm. Shortly thereafter, bootlegger Matt Kolb allowed Touhy to buy into his business. Kolb owned a saloon near Touhy's automobile dealership, and Touhy said he once sold Kolb a vehicle. Kolb had once been part of Al Capone's Chicago Outfit, supplying as much as a third of the beer it sold but quit as the Outfit became more violent. For an investment of $10,000 ($200,000 in 2025 dollars), Touhy became a partner with Kolb.

Touhy's bootlegging business expanded dramatically. Touhy and Kolb built 10 illegal beer and liquor breweries northwest of Chicago (Note: The smell of used mash was particularly odiferous, and a tip-off to law enforcement that illegal brewing was occurring on a property. To avoid a raid on his own home, where beer brewing was occurring, Touhy needed to dump his used mash in a nearby creek. Between his home and the creek lay another farm. Touhy invited his neighbors on a free, three-week vacation in Europe. During their absence, Touhy's men built a drainage and sewer system beneath the neighbor's farm which allowed him to dump used mash in the creek. The neighbors returned home with no evidence of what had occurred on their property.) and built a wooden barrel manufacturing plant in Schiller Park for transporting the goods. (Note: Making his own casks ensured they were leak-proof, unlike those supplied by others. Once, Al Capone claimed the barrels of beer which Touhy had sold him leaked, and refused to pay $1,900. Touhy, knowing his barrels were good, met Capone face-to-face and said, "Don't try to chisel me, Al." Capone backed down.) Touhy purchased oil trucks and had them painted to look like Texaco vehicles to hide the delivery of his alcohol. He even hired off-duty police officers to drive the trucks to help avoid arrests. Unlike other bootleggers, Touhy and Kolb consulted a chemist, and brewed a high-quality beer.

Demand for Touhy's beer was extremely high. Touhy and Kolb sold their bootleg alcohol to a network of 200 bars, nightclubs, and roadhouses west and northwest of Chicago. They regularly sold 18,000 bottles of beer a week. During summer (the peak season for beer drinking), they could sell an enormous 1,000 barrels of beer a week, making a profit of $50.50 ($936.00 in 2025 dollars) on a $55 barrel. (Note: It cost Touhy and Kolb $4.50 to brew a barrel of beer.)

Touhy and Kolb also got into the slot machine racket in 1926. Although illegal, slot machines were highly popular, and Touhy and Kolb were able to put hundreds of them in drug stores, gas stations, grocery stores, and taverns throughout the area they controlled. The two men grossed $1 million ($18.2 million in 2025 dollars) from slot machines alone that first year.

For several years, Touhy avoided problems with law enforcement by becoming one of the best fixers in the Chicago area. Like nearly all bootleggers, he paid extensive bribes to judges, police, and prosecutors, and he supplemented his payments with free shipments of his high-quality beer (which often was more prized than the cash). For high-level officials, Touhy printed personalized labels for each person to whom he gave bottled beer. He aided law enforcement by keeping bottom-rung gangsters (who were more likely to cause problems for a community) out of Des Plaines, and refused to allow brothels to operate in the northwest and west suburbs of Chicago. He won the grudging respect of the local community for regularly donating large amounts of beer to local civic, fraternal, and social fundraising events, and for buying ice cream for hundreds of children each Sunday.

=== Rivalry with Capone ===
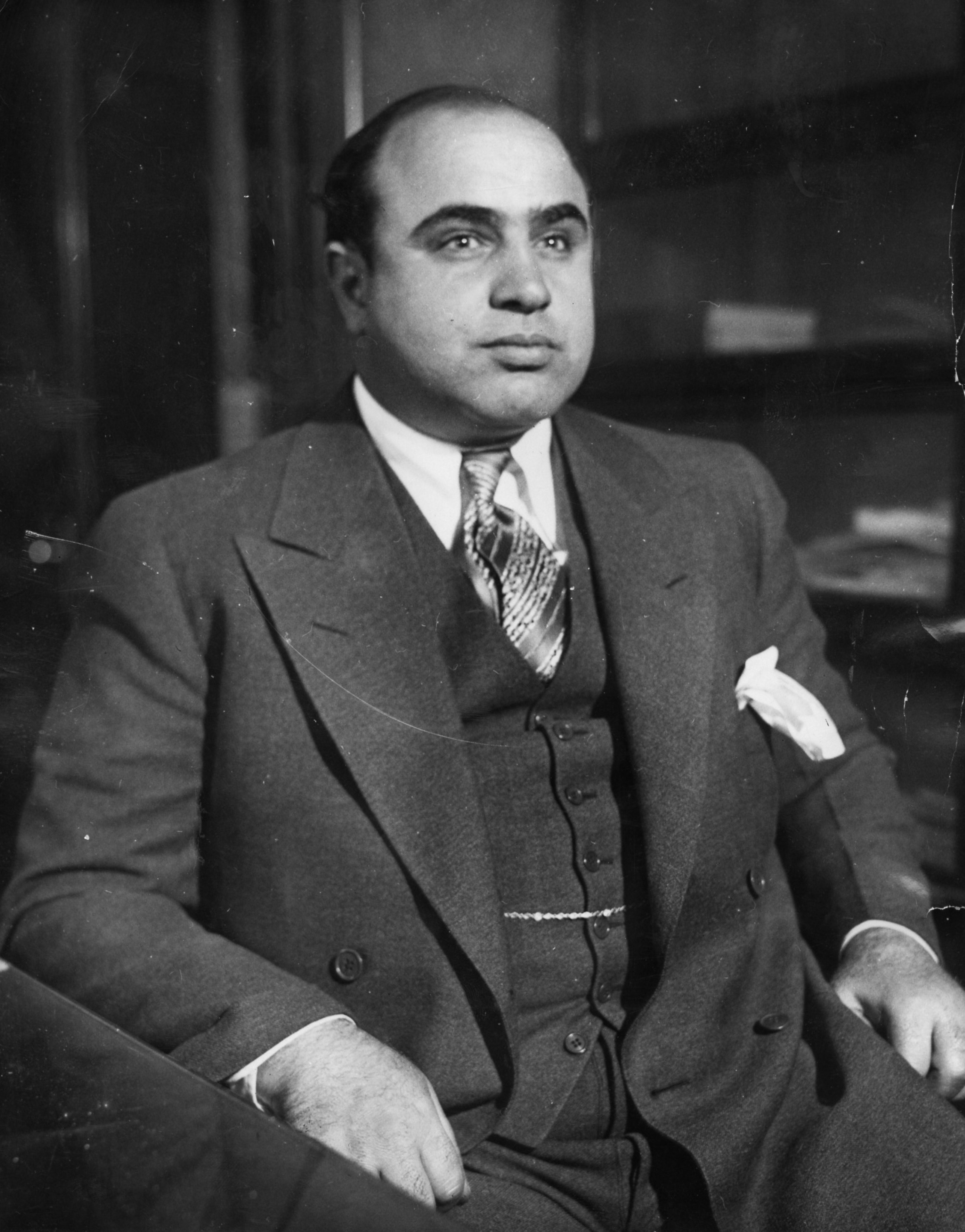
Al Capone in 1930

By the late 1920s, the Chicago Outfit was ordering hundreds of barrels of beer a week from Touhy and Kolb. At one point, Touhy was selling Capone 800 barrels of beer a week at a discounted price of $37.50 per barrel ($695.00 in 2025 dollars) (making a profit of 488 percent on each barrel).

Capone first tested Touhy's toughness (Note: The sequence of Capone's events to intimidate Touhy vary from source to source. The sequence in this article follows that provided by Touhy himself, and which is supported by Kenneth Allsop and Jay Nash. Other sources vary as to the timeline. For example, Gus Russo says that the Humphreys/Fawcett meeting with Touhy occurred in 1930, and that prior to this meeting Humphreys had kidnapped Matt Kolb. Touhy, however, puts Kolb's kidnapping last in the sequence of events. In contrast, Sanford Horwitt puts Kolb's kidnapping after the Humphreys/Fawcett meeting. He also indicates that the kidnapping was relatively close, chronologically, to Kolb's death. Nitti biographer Mars Eghigian has the Heeney/Rio meeting first, the Humphreys/Fawcett meeting second, and Kolb's kidnapping last. The date of these events is unclear. Russo puts the date of the Humphreys/Fawcett meeting with Touhy in 1930, while Troy Taylor puts the Heeney/Rio meeting in 1931. Yet, according to Touhy's own account, the Heeney/Rio meeting came first and the Humphreys/Fawcett meeting second, and both were within weeks of one another.) by sending Outfit members Willie Heeney and Frank Rio to meet with Touhy. The men told Touhy that Capone felt the northwestern suburbs were "virgin territory" for brothels, illegal gambling, and taxi dance halls.

Touhy's gang was small, so he chose to intimidate Heeney and Rio: he lined his office walls with handguns and rifles, and borrowed submachine guns from the local police. Touhy hired off-duty police officers and local farmers to lounge around the building while armed. While Touhy talked with Heeney, men would occasionally enter the office, grab a weapon, and casually tell Touhy they were going to kill someone. Touhy would nod in agreement or mumble his approval. Touhy also arranged for a man to call his office every few minutes. He would answer the phone, pretend to listen, and then order someone intimidated or killed. Touhy told Heeney that he didn't want anything Capone was offering, and to stay out of his territory. Heeney and Rio left convinced that the Touhy gang was large, well-armed, and ruthless and that a gang war would be devastating to the Chicago Outfit. Capone backed down. Word of the meeting spread, and Touhy gained the unlikely nickname "Touhy the Terrible".

A short time later, Capone sent Louis "Little New York" Campagna and Jack "Machine Gun" McGurn to Touhy. They advised Touhy to turn over part of his business to the Chicago Outfit, but Touhy refused. Once more, Touhy "playacted" for the men, who left convinced Touhy was more powerful than he really was. (Note: Gus Russo says that it was Humphreys and Fawcett who offered the merger deal to Touhy, not Campagna and McGurn.)

According to Touhy, he now approached local law enforcement and retailers and told them about Capone's interest in the western suburbs. He asked them to resist Capone's attempt to get them to sell punchboards or buy low-quality beer, and in turn Touhy said he would resist Capone. The appeal worked.

Capone now attempted to lure Touhy into a trap. He sent Francis "Frank Diamond" Maritote, Sam "Golf Bag" Hunt, and Frank Rio to see Touhy again. (Note: Maritote was Capone's brother-in-law. Hunt received his nickname because he allegedly carried a shotgun in a golf bag on his shoulder.) The playacting did not impress Rio this time, even after Touhy claimed to have 200 prison-toughened thugs in his gang. Touhy, sensing trouble, told the trio that he was hosting a party for all his men that night at The Arch, his Schiller Park roadhouse. Touhy invited Capone, Nitti, and all the other top leaders of the Chicago Outfit to the party. Touhy had no intention of hosting a party; instead, he closed the roadhouse early in the evening and removed all liquor from the premises. Chicago police and Cook County sheriff's men raided the premises that evening, sent there on a tip by Capone.

Capone then laid a second trap. He sent Murray "The Camel" Humphreys to Touhy to suggest an alliance. Humphreys and his driver/bodyguard, James "Red" Fawcett, met with Touhy and asked him to come to Capone's headquarters in Cicero, Illinois, to meet with underboss Frank Nitti and hammer out a deal. Warned by a Capone insider that the Outfit intended to kill him, Touhy told Humphreys that Nitti should come to Schiller Park. When Humphreys threatened Touhy, Touhy pointed a shotgun at him. Humphreys was visibly intimidated, and Touhy sent him back to Nitti, humiliated.

Capone's last attempt to intimidate Touhy came on March 4, 1931, when an Outfit member named Summers visited Touhy and once again proposed bringing brothels, gambling, and taxi dance halls to the northwestern suburbs. Touhy bribed two of his men to take Summers out drinking. They ended up at Capone's Cotton Club in Cicero where the two men successfully urged Summers to pick a fight with Ralph Capone, who ran the club (and whom Summers did not know). Two federal law enforcement officers drinking at the club came to Ralph's defense, and were disarmed. Touhy's men kept their firearms. Capone desperately needed to return the federally-owned firearms to the Treasury agents, and contacted Touhy. Touhy feigned ignorance of the two men's identity and suggested that Summers knew who they were, but Capone had already had Summers killed. Federal officials raided the Cotton Club on March 12 and again on March 13 looking for the guns, and shut it down.

Capone began to apply pressure in other ways. Chicago Outfit men began to occasionally travel to the western and northwestern suburbs and engage in short gun fights with Touhy's men.

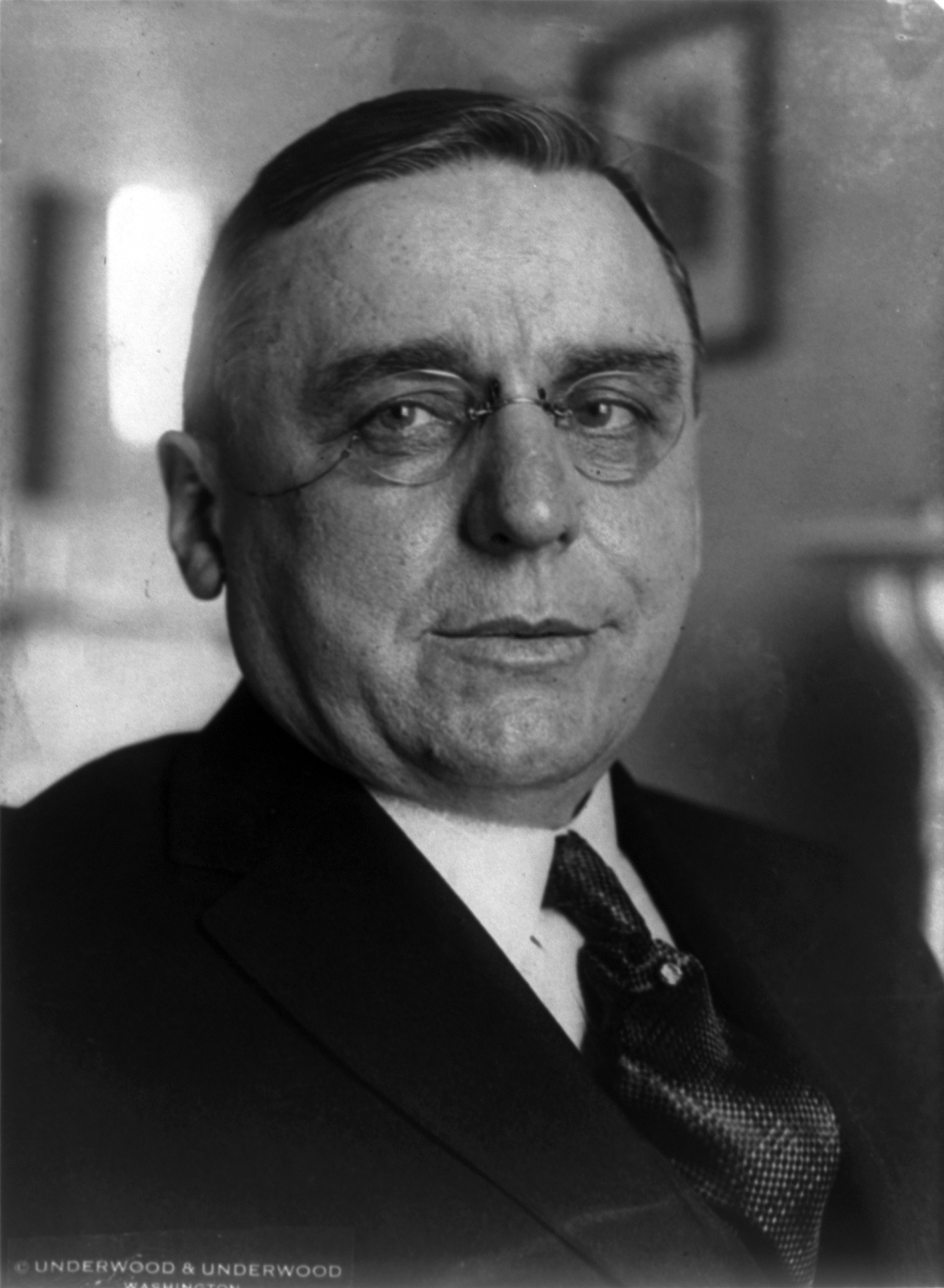
Anton Cermak

On April 8, 1931, Anton Cermak was sworn in as mayor of Chicago. As chair of the Cook County Board of Commissioners from 1923 to 1931, Cermak had gotten along very well with Touhy. Cermak had pledged to "clean up" Chicago and get rid of violent gangs. Cermak was allegedly advised that strict enforcement of Prohibition was impossible. A better option was to have a "good gang" like Touhy's take over from the Chicago Outfit, which was not only more violent but also promoting gambling, prostitution, and a wide range of other vices. Cermak then met Touhy and urged him to take over Capone's territory. Touhy, whose gang was relatively small and nonviolent, balked. Cermak then suggested that the Chicago Police Department would assist in putting pressure on the Outfit through raids, arrests, prosecutions, and even killings. Cermak allegedly offered to allow Touhy to take over bootlegging in Chicago if the war was successful. (Note: Historians are not in complete agreement with this narrative. Crime historian Kristofer Allerfeldt provides an overview of the different views of Cermak's relationship with organized crime and Touhy.) Touhy's men now began engaging in gun battles with Chicago Outfit members within the Chicago city limits.

The alleged alliance between Cermak and Touhy alarmed Al Capone. Some time in the first three months of 1931, while Touhy was vacationing in Florida, Capone's men threatened Matt Kolb with death if he did not pay them $25,000 ($500,000 in 2025 dollars). Kolb did so. Capone then had Kolb kidnapped. Touhy paid a $50,000 ($1,100,000 in 2025 dollars) ransom to free him. Sensing Kolb was the weak link in the Touhy-Kolb partnership, Capone sent several capos into the northwestern suburbs and seized 40 of Kolb's bars, clubs, and resorts in early May 1931. Kolb's liquor was poured out, his gambling machines destroyed, and the managers told to buy alcohol from Capone in the future. Capone then ordered Matt Kolb killed. Just before 2 A.M. on October 18, 1931, two Capone hitmen murdered Kolb inside Kolb's Club Morton in Morton Grove, Illinois.

After Kolb's death, Touhy lived in fear and surrounded himself with armed guards.

=== Battle for control of the Chicago labor movement ===
Touhy's involvement with the labor movement began again in 1929 when Capone approached Touhy with a proposal to take over several Chicago-area locals of the International Brotherhood of Teamsters (IBT). (Note: The Chicago Outfit had been engaged in labor racketeering throughout the 1920s. Murray "The Camel" Humphreys led this effort, which involved intimidating trade unions into appointing a member of the Outfit as their "business agent". The agent used Outfit thugs to terrorize businesses during collective bargaining negotiations and extract high wage concessions. Worker wages were paid to the "business agent", who passed on only a portion of the money to workers. Humphreys then intimidated employers into joining a "trade association" to fight such shakedowns, pocketing most of the "dues" businesses paid. In the late 1920s, the Chicago Outfit began to actually take over union locals, installing Outfit members as officials and board members and transferring large sums of union dues money to the Outfit's bank accounts. Identifying which locals were ripe for takeover was the job of Outfit member George "Red" Barker. "Trade associations" also engaged in collusive price fixing and permitted customers to work only with those businesses approved by the "trade association". Although such practices were common before the Outfit's infiltration, the Outfit now skimmed money from them.) Marcus "Studdy" Looney of Chicago Outfit met with Touhy and showed him a list of various American Federation of Labor (AFL) unions in the area and how much money each of them had in their treasury. (Note: Touhy was dismissive of Looney as a "pimp who had graduated into labor muscling." According to the Chicago Tribune, however, Looney had been engaged in labor slugging (the use of thugs to intimidate employers and non-union employees) since 1905 for the Marcus Gilhooley Gang. He was one of the earliest labor racketeers, and an attempt was made on his life at the District Council headquarters in 1916. He had gotten himself named president of the head of the Excavating, Grading, and Dump Drivers local after driving the incumbent president out of town, and of the Hoisting Engineers local, and was diverting enormous sums of money to the Outfit.) The Teamsters were a particular focus of the Outfit. Touhy declined to participate in the scheme. Capone went ahead with the takeovers of the local unions anyway.

The Outfit's attempt to take control of the Teamsters District Council and other local unions began in the fall of 1930. At first, the presidents of the independent Teamsters and other union officials sought help from Touhy and other non-Outfit gangsters. They purchased homes close to Touhy's in Des Plaines in the hope that proximity would discourage assassination attempts. These labor officials began hiring bodyguards, many of whom were ex-gangsters. As Touhy told a federal court in 1952, (Note: Touhy's account of the Outfit's takeover of Chicago-area labor unions is considered reliable. Labor historian David Scott Witwer has noted, "A bootlegger, a rival of Capone, and himself the target of allegations that he strong-armed union officials, Touhy's account should be read with a healthy amount of skepticism. But it generally squares with the accounts provided by other sources, and it helps explain how the Outfit came to wield influence over the Building Service Union.")

William Rooney, president of Sheet Metal Workers union; Patrick J. "Paddy" Berrell, vice president of the IBT; and Art Wallace, secretary-treasurer of the Painters union met with Touhy in 1931 and asked him to hold on to $125,000 ($2,600,000 in 2025 dollars) which they had raised as a fund to fight Outfit takeovers. (Note: Although Touhy does not provide a date for this meeting in his 1959 book, it most likely began after the fall of 1930, as that is the date he gave the federal district court for the start of the Outfit's domination of union locals in the Chicago area. Rooney was slain by gangsters on March 19, 1931, so the meeting had to take place before then.) Touhy claims he retained the money until Berrell and Jerry Horan, president of the Building Service Employees International Union, retrieved it some time later. (Note: Touhy does not provide a date for the retrieval of the money in his 1952 testimony. However, Berrell was slain on July 21, 1932, so it must have occurred before then.)

Thomas J. Courtney, who became Cook County State's Attorney in 1933, was ostensibly a reformer who professed a desire to root out organized crime influence in the labor movement. Courtney had little interest in doing so, intending to use his defense of collective bargaining as a means of seeking higher office. Modern historians agree that, behind the scenes, Courtney engaged in collusion with gang leaders. The Chicago District Council of Teamsters (an umbrella group for Teamster locals in the area) had broken away from the IBT in 1905, (Note: The District Council locals were rife with corruption. They colluded with employers, using strikes and picketing to limit competition. In turn, the employers lessened their opposition to the union, and worked with the District Council to eliminate independent unions. After the 1905 strike, the international union attempted to clean up the District Council. The locals disaffiliated from the international to avoid this anti-corruption effort.) and now Courtney colluded with the AFL and IBT to force the independent District Council back into the IBT. Courtney's chief investigator, Chicago Police captain Daniel A. Gilbert, became the point-man for Courtney's efforts. (Note: Gilbert was on the payroll of the Chicago Outfit, and had long protected its members from arrest or prosecution. Gilbert was likely behind the murder of Teamsters District Council president Michael J. "Mike" Galvin in November 1936. Gilbert became so wealthy from his participation in organized crime that by 1950 he was derisively called "the richest cop in America".) Under the agreement, Courtney had to approve of the leaders of IBT locals in the area, and was permitted to bar certain individuals from membership. (Note: The Outfit's corruption of the Chicago Police Department was so extensive that the police failed to arrest a single individual for the 13 murders of high-ranking labor union officials that occurred in the 1930s.)

Courtney faced a Chicago Outfit in disarray. (Note: Ralph Capone and eight of his associates were imprisoned in April 1930. Jack "Greasy Thumb" Guzik, the Outfit's primary political fixer, was imprisoned in November 1930. Frank Nitti went to prison for 18 months in January 1931. Sam Guzik followed his brother to prison in April 1931. "Machine Gun" Jack McGurn went to prison in July 1931. With the conviction of Al Capone on tax evasion charges in October 1931, this left only two of the Outfit's top men—Dennis "The Duke" Cooney and Ted Newberry—to run the mob. Newberry was actually a member of the North Side Gang run by Dean O'Banion and George "Bugs" Moran. The murder of O'Banion in 1924 and the diminution of the gang after the Saint Valentine's Day Massacre in 1929 led Newberry to make peace with and become an ally of the Chicago Outfit, which essentially granted him a "concession" to run illegal activities on the North Side.) When Al Capone was imprisoned on October 24, 1931, only two of the Chicago Outfit's top 16 leaders remained out of prison.

Lower-level mobsters now fought for control of the Chicago Outfit. Irish gangster and Outfit member George "Red" Barker had been in control of a number of union locals in Chicago since 1928, (Note: Barker demanded control of the Coal Teamsters, Local 704, in 1928. Members of this union drove the trucks which hauled coal to every business, factory, and home in the Chicago area. Control of the Coal Teamsters would be a very lucrative source of income for the Outfit. Local 704 president James "Lefty" Lynch balked at Barker's demands. Barker sent hitmen to Wisconsin, where Lynch was vacationing, and the men shot him in both legs on April 28, 1928. The next day, Barker assumed the presidency of Local 704.) and now began using this base of power to put pressure on the Sicilian mobsters who had dominated the Outfit under Capone. Barker was murdered in June 1932. The press reported at the time that the Sicilian faction was responsible, although labor historian David Scott Witwer says someone from Touhy's gang was the likely culprit. After Barker's death, Capt. Gilbert began putting Courtney-approved leaders in charge of the "liberated" local unions. In retaliation for the Barker murder, the Outfit killed Berrell in July 1932.

Touhy was aware of the collusion between Courtney and the IBT to dominate the District Council. After the death of Barker, Courtney installed a pro-IBT president as president of the Coal Haulers, and removed Looney as president of the Excavating, Grading, and Dump Drivers. (Note: This did not curtail Looney's involvement in labor racketeering. He was likely responsible for the 1931 murders of west side labor leader Timothy Lynch and gangster "Dago" Dan Tagnetti. In 1933, Looney, Charles "Trigger Happy" Fischetti, Murray Humphreys, William "Klondike" O'Donnell, and "Three Finger" Jack White were unsuccessfully tried for conspiracy in 1933. They operated the Trucking & Transportation Exchange, an organization which allegedly acted as a pool of trucks, railroad cars, and other conveyances but which in fact was a vehicle for labor racketeering that preyed on both union members and employers.) On February 2, 1933, Tommy Touhy and other members of the Touhy gang attacked James "Fur" Sammons, a hitman for the O'Donnell Gang, (Note: This gang, led by Myles O'Donnell, operated on Chicago's West Side.) and several others involved in labor racketeering, but managed to neither kill nor wound anyone. (Note: William "Klondike" O'Donnell appears to have allied with the Chicago Outfit by this time, which may provide a rationale for the attack.) Worried that Touhy's attack might embolden union leaders to resist the Outfit, Frank Nitti (Note: Nitti was released from prison on March 24, 1932, after serving 14 months of his 18-month prison sentence.) ordered a series of vandalisms and bombings that intimidated business owners and unions alike into remaining under the Outfit's control.

The Cullen–Harrison Act, which legalized the sale in the United States of beer and wine with an alcohol content of 3.2% (by weight), went into effect on April 7, 1933. Organized crime sought to retain its profits by imposing a protection racket on now-legal brewers. On April 8, the Prima Brewing Company plant in Chicago was bombed, and there was some suggestion that Touhy (not the Chicago Outfit) had planted the explosive device.

Touhy's last known involvement with the labor movement came in April 1933. Early that month, Horan and Arthur Wallace (secretary-treasurer of the Chicago District Council of the Painters Union) met with Touhy and told him they were giving in to the Chicago Outfit's demands. Horan asked Capt. Gilbert to set up a meeting with the Outfit, and turned his union over to the mob. Wallace did the same. On Friday, April 28, 1933, a group of men wielding machine guns entered the Teamsters District Council headquarters building at 637 S. Ashland Avenue in Chicago at about 8:30 A.M. and held about 80 people hostage for three hours. (Note: The number of gunmen is disputed by sources, which claim five, six, or 10 men. The number of individuals held hostage also varies by source, with some saying it was 30 or 40 people, 70 people, 80 people or 100 people. The variation in numbers may be because the gang held hostage anyone who entered the building while they held it.) The leader of the gunmen declared their purpose was to break the hold of Murray "The Camel" Humphreys, William "Klondike" O'Donnell, and "Three Finger" Jack White on the Teamster unions. When the three gangsters did not appear as expected after three hours, the gunmen kidnapped Fred Sass, business agent of the Ash Wagon Drivers Union, and Morris Goldberg, clerk for the Moving Van Drivers Union. Someone later communicated with Frank Goldberg, Morris' brother, and assured him Morris was uninjured. The gunmen held the two men over the weekend, apparently in the belief that Sass and Goldberg (who was O'Donnell's brother-in-law) knew where the three Outfit members were. Sass and Goldberg repeatedly said they did not know. The duo was told to quit their union jobs or face assassination, and were released around dawn on Monday, May 1. The Chicago Tribune initially declared that Roger Touhy himself led the kidnappers, but a few days later reported only that "members of the Touhy gang" had committed the kidnapping. According to one theory, the Touhy gang had seen revenues dry up with the repeal of Prohibition, and were seeking to take over unions themselves as a way of generating income. Another theory was that the Touhy gang had been hired by the IBT, which was seeking to wrest back control of the District Council. A third theory held that Roger Touhy was seeking to take over unions in an attempt to raise money to pay for the medical care of his brother Tommy, who had recently been partially paralyzed. (Note: According to the press, the Touhy mob kidnapped mail robber James Murray in mid-March, and successfully sought a $10,000 ransom from his family.)

== Hamm kidnapping charge ==
=== Conceiving the Hamm kidnapping ===
Alvin Karpis, Fred Barker, and Fred's mother took up residence in St. Paul, Minnesota, in late December 1931. (Note: The gang left the city on April 25, 1932, to avoid police capture, and did not return until July 9, 1932. They spent the period from the first week of January 1933 to April 1933 in Reno, Nevada, spending money from a bank heist.) There, Alvin and Fred formed a new incarnation of the Barker–Karpis gang. (Note: Fred's older brother, convicted murderer Arthur "Doc" Barker, was paroled from the Oklahoma State Penitentiary on September 10, 1932, and joined the gang in St. Paul a few days later.) Local gangster and casino owner Jack Peifer put the Barker-Karpis gang up in a rented cottage in White Bear Lake, Minnesota, on the outskirts of St. Paul. Kidnapping had become a lucrative enterprise for American gangsters in the past year. The number of high-profile kidnappings reached 27 in 1933, more than double the number in 1932. It was safer than bank robbery but just as lucrative. In early June 1933, Peifer met with Barker-Karpis gang leaders and persuaded them to kidnap William Hamm Jr., president of the Hamm's Brewing Company and heir to the Hamm family fortune. (Note: Who attended the meeting varies according to different sources. For example, Frethem and Smith say that Karpis and Fred Barker met with Jack Peifer. Mahoney says only Karpis met with Peifer. Nash, however, says Fred and Doc Barker met with St. Paul crime boss Harry Sawyer and Peifer.)

The rationale for kidnapping Hamm, Peifer said, was the $100,000 ransom ($2.49 million in 2025 dollars) the gang could expect to collect. (Note: Robert "Frisco Dutch" Steinhardt was a pickpocket from Chicago who became a bouncer at two illegal casinos in St. Paul. He'd become an expert on running illegal gambling operations, and was a friend of the Barker-Karpis gang. The Hamm brewery had stayed open during Prohibition making near beer, soft drinks, alcohol for industrial purposes, barley malt syrup, confectioner's ingredients, and other items. Organized crime, however, wanted to take over the brewery and begin making beer again. According to an FBI informant, William Hamm Jr. paid Steinhardt $6,000 to $8,000 a year to keep the mob out. Congress legalized intoxicating beverages with 3.2 percent alcohol by weight on April 7, 1933, and the 21st Amendment repealing Prohibition was ratified on December 5, 1933. With Prohibition ending, Hamm ceased to make payments. According to historian Julie Thompson, this made Hamm "fair game" for predatory activities by organized crime, and may have been a factor in his kidnapping.)

Some historians assert that the Barker-Karpis gang was manipulated into kidnapping Hamm so Touhy could be framed for the crime and eliminated as competition for the Chicago Outfit. (Note: Karpis may not have been completely duped. In his memoir, Karpis claimed that, even in 1933, he suspected the kidnapping had more to do with sending a signal to Ramsey County officials and Tom Dahill, the new St. Paul chief of police, who had pledged to clean up the city.) Sources vary widely as to who conceived of framing Touhy. It may have been Outfit head Frank Nitti, but the idea may have come from Murray "The Camel" Humphreys, the Outfit's chief fixer and labor racketeer. (Note: Some sources claim that the idea originated with Al Capone himself, or with Capone acting through Capt. Gilbert. This seems unlikely, as by June 1933 Capone had already been incarcerated for a year at the federal penitentiary in Atlanta. By mid-1933, Capone was suffering from neurosyphilis that was impairing his mental faculties, making it unlikely he had ordered the scheme. Moreover, despite unsubstantiated claims to the contrary by other prisoners, Capone had completely turned over control of the Chicago Outfit to Frank Nitti and a group of other high-ranking gangsters, who ran it corporatively (without the need for a single chief, like Capone).) Tom Brown, the corrupt ex-chief of police of St. Paul, or Chicago Police captain Daniel Gilbert may also have conceived of the plot. Crime historian Jay Nash says the idea came jointly from Peifer, Harry Sawyer, and Fred Goetz (a.k.a. George "Shotgun" Ziegler), a Chicago Outfit assassin. Historian Julie A. Thompson, however, attributes it only to Peifer.

=== Hamm and Factor kidnappings ===
The Barker–Karpis gang kidnapped Hamm shortly after 12:15 PM on June 15, 1933, as he walked from the brewery to his home in St. Paul. Four men assisted Karpis and Barker in kidnapping Hamm: Arthur "Doc" Barker (Fred's brother), Byron Bolton, Charles "Old Fitz" Fitzgerald, and Fred Goetz. (Note: Peifer recruited Goetz from the Chicago Outfit to help with the kidnapping. Goetz had posed as a police officer in the Saint Valentine's Day Massacre in 1929, and by the early 1930s was a high-ranking member of the Outfit. Goetz had known Peifer for years. Despite receiving a regular cut of the Outfit's profits, Goetz was in chronic need of money. He had also openly boasted of his role in the massacre, angering other members of the Outfit. Participating in the kidnapping would earn him money as well as possible forgiveness from the Outfit. Goetz recruited Bolton. Bolton had served as lookout at the Saint Valentine's Day Massacre, but bungled the job and left behind fingerprints. He, too, likely hoped that helping with the Hamm kidnapping would redeem him in the eyes of the Outfit. Another eight other people, most of them also members of the Barker–Karpis gang, assisted with the kidnapping. Among them were Edmund Bartholmey and Elmer "Deafy" Farmer. Bartholmey's home in Bensenville, Illinois, was where Hamm was held.) Brown, still a detective with the St. Paul police, kept the Barker-Karpis gang apprised of the FBI and St. Paul police investigations into the kidnapping. The Hamm family paid the $100,000 ransom on June 17, and Hamm was freed at dawn on June 19.

Melvin Purvis was the FBI Special Agent in Charge of the investigation into the Hamm kidnapping. From the beginning, Purvis believed that the Touhy gang committed the kidnapping. Purvis may have convinced himself of this, but it is also documented that Capt. Daniel Gilbert told Purvis that the Chicago police had information that Touhy was responsible.

On June 30, gangster and stock manipulator John "Jake the Barber" Factor disappeared. Factor was facing extradition to the United Kingdom for trial on charges of stock fraud. Factor conceived of the kidnapping as a way to avoid extradition, as American law enforcement and prosecutors would need to keep him in the U.S. as legal proceedings against the kidnappers went forward. The British consul in the United States declared the kidnapping a farce.

Factor's disappearance was convenient for the Outfit: Not only could police blame the Factor "kidnapping" on Touhy, but Factor (himself an affiliate of The Outfit) could accuse Touhy as well. Capt. Gilbert told Purvis that he was convinced Touhy was responsible. Gilbert publicly accused Touhy of engineering Factor's abduction on July 3, and repeated the claim several times to the press. Gilbert later claimed that he had 25 law enforcement officers trying to find Touhy in the days after Factor's kidnapping, but could not find him. Factor reappeared on July 12, allegedly after payment of a $70,000 ransom ($1.74 million in 2025 dollars). The same day, Gilbert's men arrested two members of the Touhy gang for kidnapping Factor.

=== Arrest and indictment ===
Unconcerned about Gilbert's public statements, Touhy decided to go on a mid-July fishing trip in southern Wisconsin with fellow gangsters Edward "Father Tom" McFadden, Gustave "Gloomy Gus" Schaefer, and Willie Sharkey. While returning to Chicago on July 19, Tuohy's car skidded off the road in misty, rainy weather and struck a utility pole. Touhy reported the accident and attempted to pay for the pole. Police discovered some weapons in Touhy's vehicle, (Note: Police said they found a rifle, seven pistols, a large amount of ammunition, a roll of gauze, adhesive tape, rope, and $1,730 in cash in the vehicle.) and arrested the four on concealed weapons charges. Purvis drove to Wisconsin, and took Touhy and his three associates to Minnesota without an extradition order.

The FBI falsely claimed to have an "ironclad case" against Touhy. Taxicab driver Leo J. Allison failed to identify any of the four men as the person who paid him $2 to take a ransom note to the Hamm family. The four men were taken to Hamm's brewery office in secret, and Hamm failed to identify them as his kidnappers. Unable to link Touhy to the Factor kidnapping, (Note: Touhy and his men were presented in a police lineup, but Jake Factor could not identify any of them as his kidnappers.) the four men were sent back to Elkhorn to face weapons charges. Only then did Purvis claim he had four eyewitnesses connecting Touhy and his men to the Hamm kidnapping. Touhy could have sought a writ of habeas corpus, as Purvis decline to provide the names of his eyewitnesses to a federal court. To discourage this, Purvis added a charge of conspiracy to kidnap, and indicated he would keep adding charges to prevent any release of Touhy. (Note: Capt. Gilbert also arrested Touhy associates Marty O'Leary and Carlos Fontana, but was forced to release them on lack of evidence of any crime.) With little evidence on which to hold Touhy, FBI agents beat Touhy brutally and did not let him sleep in an attempt to wring a confession from him. (Note: Touhy later described what happened: "I went into jail in excellent physical shape. When I came out I was twenty-five pounds lighter, three vertebrae in my upper spine were fractured, and seven of my teeth had been knocked out. ... They questioned me day and night, abused me, beat me up, and demanded that I confess the Hamm kidnapping. Never was I allowed to rest for more than half an hour. If I was asleep when a team of interrogators arrived at my cell, they would slug me around and bang me against the wall.")

The federal court scheduled a hearing on Touhy's motion for summary judgment on August 14. Federal agents made a series of wild and inaccurate claims which bolstered their case in public. The FBI said it had been investigating Touhy for two years already, and had intensified their focus on him after enactment of the Federal Kidnapping Act on June 22, 1932. Federal law enforcement officials now claimed that Touhy had kidnapped people in Kansas City, Missouri; Denver, Colorado; and Minneapolis and St. Paul, Minnesota, and had operated a vast kidnap ring operating across the entire Midwestern United States. The United States Department of Justice reiterated its claim that the case against Touhy was "ironclad". FBI agents told the press that Touhy was a "callous killer; cruel by nature and devoid of any human attributes; driven by an insane desire for gangland power, which makes him absolutely ruthless and more deadly than a viper". They claimed he had a gang of more than 100 killers, "a loosely knit band of the most notorious desperadoes in the country, most of them fugitives from justice". Touhy, they said, led "a reign of terror" and "boasted that the law could not touch him" FBI agents also claimed that Touhy was so vicious that even other gangsters called him "America's Menace".

On August 8, the Justice Department convened a federal grand jury to hear evidence regarding an indictment against Touhy and the other three men on charges of kidnapping, conspiracy to kidnap, and interstate transportation of a person held for ransom. Testifying before the grand jury were the arresting officers from Elkhorn, the Walworth County sheriff, three Chicago police officers, and William Hamm, among others. (Note: Most of the evidence concerned the alleged kidnapping materials found in the trunk of Touhy's car, although the prosecutor also claimed that a pistol altered into an illegal machine gun. Prosecutors also claimed that the money found in Touhy's automobile matched the serial numbers on the money used to ransom Hamm. The serial number claim later proved false.) On August 12, 1933, all four men were indicted by grand jury on charges of kidnapping, conpsiracy, and interstate transportation. (Note: George Wilkie and his wife, Stella, were arrested by FBI agents on August 2 and charged with being accomplices in the Hamm kidnapping. Both were released 11 days later.) A grand jury indictment did not require that any accusatory evidence be revealed to the defendants or the court, quashing Touhy's habeas corpus effort.

=== Pre-trial activities in the Hamm kidnapping ===
Roger Touhy and his co-defendants were among the first people to be prosecuted under Federal Kidnapping Act. L.L. Drill, the United States District Attorney for St. Paul, now admitted the case against Touhy was thin at first, but he was "fairly confident" that now it had "nothing lacking". Dissatisfied with Drill's preparation and handling of the case, (Note: Allegedly, the names of several eyewitnesses to the Hamm kidnapping and ransom delivery were included in the indictment issued by the grand jury. Drill had the indictment on his desk, and "someone" (a reporter, a defense lawyer, or some other person) saw the names of the eyewitnesses. Fearful that the eyewitnesses would now be murdered or intimidated, the prosecution decided not to use them at Tuohy's trial. This incident is, the press said, what caused Cummings to conclude Drill was inept.) United States Attorney General Homer Cummings replaced him with Special Assistant to the Attorney General Joseph B. Keenan. (Note: Keenan, a special assistant in the office of the Ohio Attorney General, was appointed by President Franklin D. Roosevelt as Special Assistant to the U.S. Attorney General. Sworn in on July 7, 1933, he was tasked with tackling a wide range of organized crime, including drug smuggling, kidnapping, and racketeering. Keenan was appointed Assistant Attorney General in October 1933.) Keenan had successfully convicted George "Machine Gun" Kelly and three others for the kidnapping of oil man Charles F. Urschel, and his experience was believed to be critical to convicting Touhy.

The FBI now developed evidence of Touhy's innocence. Alvin Karpis, "Doc" Barker, and George Fitzgerald had left their fingerprints on the ransom notes given to the Hamm family. The FBI Technical and Research Laboratory, established in the fall of 1932, had only just developed a technique to lift fingerprints from paper. This technique was now used to lift the Karpis gang's prints from the ransom notes on September 6, 1933.

Despite evidence of the involvement of the Barker-Karpis gang, law enforcement continued to press their case against Touhy, McFadden, Schaefer, and Sharkey. Touhy was indicted for leading a $234,000 ($5.82 million in 2025 dollars) mail robbery in Sacramento, California, in February 1933. (Note: Also indicted were Gus Schaefer, his wife, convicted felon George Kerr, William Barry, and a John Doe.) Police in Nebraska believed Touhy and Sharkey led a $51,000 ($1.2 million in 2025 dollars) bank robbery in Grand Island in 1932. Schaefer and Sharkey, along with Frank "Blackie" McKee and "Silent Jim" Ryan (two other alleged members of the Touhy gang), were indicted for a mail robbery in Minneapolis in January 1933. Alleged Touhy associates Gene Thomas (a.k.a. Frank McGee) and George W. "Red" Kerr were indicted for participating in a $100,000 ($2.49 million in 2025 dollars) mail robbery in Milwaukee in January 1933.

=== Hamm trial ===
Judge Matthew M. Joyce of the United States District Court for the District of Minnesota presided over the Touhy trial. The lead prosecutor was Joseph B. Keenan. The nine jurors were seated on November 9, 1933.

Keenan's star witness was William Hamm. Hamm identified McFadden as one of his kidnappers on the trial's first day, and then recanted his testimony the next day. When asked by the prosecution to identify Willie Sharkey as one of his kidnappers, Hamm could not do so. He was able to testify about a Wisconsin road sign he saw, which the prosecution said put the place of his imprisonment in Wisconsin. Keenan also called Daniel Rush to the stand, but Rush, who had seen the kidnapping from his home, was not able to identify any of the kidnappers. When pressed, Rush could only say that Sharkey "resembled" the driver of the kidnap car. Taxicab driver Leo Allison proved so reluctant to testify that Keenan had to ask the court for permission to treat Allison as a hostile witness. Only after extensive questioning did Allison admit that the man who'd given him the ransom note resembled McFadden. Two other prosecution eyewitnesses, dentist Dr. Horace C. La Bissoniere and drug store owner Clarence J. Thomas, also testified that Touhy "resembled" the man who left ransom note in Thomas' drug store. Neither could not positively identify him, however.

The prosecution had better luck from two other eyewitnesses, however. Printer Walter Bowick, who was in the drug store when one of the Hamm ransom notes was delivered, positively identified Touhy as the man who delivered the ransom note. Farm hand Charles Carlson positively identified Touhy, McFadden, and Schaefer as the men he saw loitering near the spot where the ransom money was left. Carlson stuck to his testimony despite strong defense cross-examination. Toward the end of the government's case, various law enforcement officers testified about the weapons found in the Touhy car, although none mentioned a pistol converted into a machine gun. (Note: Police found a rifle, a .28-caliber revolver, a .32-caliber revolver, a .45-caliber revolver, and two more unidentified pistols in the car as well as 23 shotgun shells and a box of rifle cartridges.) Elkhorn police also testified about the "kidnapping gear" they found in the car, which included a sash, a pair of rubber boots, and some bandages. (Note: Other witnesses included the Elkhorn and Walworth County law enforcement officers who arrested the four men; Russell Bull, police evidence photographer; the two law enforcement officers who retained custody of the goggles used to cover Hamm's eyes during his kidnapping; and William Hoenig, Wisconsin highway engineer, Charles Motl, Minnesota highway maintenance engineer, and T.R. Perry, Iowa highway maintenance engineer—all of whom testified about road signs in their respective states in an attempt to rule Minnesota and Iowa as places where Hamm might have been imprisoned. W.W. Dunn presented the ransom notes in court, and claimed that Hamm's life had been threatened repeatedly over the telephone during the trial.) The prosecution rested on November 16.

Jake Factor arrived in Minneapolis during the trial at the request of federal prosecutors. He never took the witness stand. Factor did, however, give almost daily interviews with the press on the courthouse steps in which he accused Touhy of kidnapping and torturing him.

The defense opened its case on November 17. Three and a half days were spent reading into the record depositions from a wide range of individuals who claimed to have seen Touhy, McFadden, Schaefer, and Sharkey nowhere near Minneapolis during the Hamm kidnapping. Defense attorney Thomas McMeekin attempted to introduce extensive evidence that Walter Bowick was an inveterate liar who had fled town after his prosecution testimony. Judge Joyce disallowed the evidence, arguing that it should have been raised during cross-examination. A defense effort to discredit Carlson on the grounds of witness coaching was rejected on the same grounds. (Note: The defense intended to show evidence that Carlon had been told what to say by FBI agent Werner Hanni.)

Touhy's defense relied on an alibi for June 15 and 16. The alibi was provided in part by Des Plaines lawyer Vincent Connor and his client Gus A. Palmquist. Both men said they met with Touhy on the night of June 16 when drug store ransom note was delivered, and Connor said he'd telephoned Touhy at Touhy's home on June 15. Telephone records supported Connor's testimony. Connor and Edward J. Meany, a Des Plaines realtor and insurance broker, also testified that they had met with Touhy in Des Plaines on June 15. Local police arrested both Connor and Meany as they left the courtroom, claiming they had violated a local ordinance against registering in a hotel under an assumed name. Judge Joyce was outraged when he learned of it, and freed both men. Touhy's co-defense attorney, William Scott Stewart, called the two men's imprisonment an "old trick" to intimidate defense witnesses.

Gus Schaefer's defense also rested on an alibi. He claimed he was at a motel in King City, California, the week of the Hamm kidnapping. In addition to depositions from the motel clerks, postcards postmarked sent by Schaefer to his wife from California and Wyoming on June 21 and 22 were introduced as evidence as well. Two handwriting experts testified that Schaefer had written the postcards. A prosecution attempt to impugn their testimony by comparing prison letters to the postcards failed when the experts pointed out the different writing instruments used.

Touhy's wife, Clara, testified for the defense regarding certain "kidnapping" items found in Touhy's car. The "sash cord" was a clothes line rope her children used to play with, she said. The "bandages" were rags used to clean up the car when her children became carsick, and the rubber boots were hers.

The defense rested on November 25, declining to provide alibis for McFadden or Sharkey.

The government had intended to recall William Hamm to the stand as part of its rebuttal and have him identify his kidnappers by their voices alone, but never did so. The prosecution attempted to call Jake Factor to the stand, claiming Factor would identify the four men as his kidnappers. It also attempted to bring in a new witness, Richard Gustafson, to testify that he had seen Touhy and his men loitering about the Hamm brewery for three days prior to kidnapping. Judge Joyce denied both requests on the grounds that these witnesses should have been called during the prosecution's original case. The government then rested on November 25.

The jury was out for just six and a half hours. On November 28, the jury acquitted all four men of William Hamm's kidnapping. (Note: In 1959, Touhy said that during the Hamm trial, he communicated with his wife in court by tapping his fingers in Morse code. Touhy claimed that he told her about eyewitnesses who could provide an alibi, and he believed that these eyewitnesses were critical to proving his innocence in the Hamm case.)

== Factor kidnapping trial ==
On July 21, 1933, shortly after Touhy's arrest in Elkhorn, police secretly arranged for a lineup of Touhy, McFadden, Schaeffer, and Sharkey and brought Jake Factor in to identify them as his kidnappers. He failed to recognize any of the men.

Factor now told police that his kidnappers were demanding even more money or they would kidnap him again. Factor agreed to allow FBI agent Melvin Purvis to tap his telephone, and Purvis listened in on a number of the demands for more cash. Purvis told Factor to arrange for a new payment, and the FBI decided to set a trap for anyone who showed up at the ransom drop site. The ransom was delivered by two undercover police officers in St. Paul on August 15. Basil "The Owl" Banghart and Martin "Ice Wagon" O'Connor (a.k.a. Charles Conners) showed up at the location. The two gangsters realized it was a trap, and shot their way clear even though more than 300 FBI and local law enforcement officers surrounded them and two law enforcement spotter planes circled overhead to track their getaway vehicle.

Law enforcement continued to build their case against Touhy as the Hamm kidnapping trial went forward. On September 15, Chicago Police Capt. Dan Gilbert claimed several eyewitnesses saw three members of the Touhy gang loitering about the Dells Roadhouse where Factor was kidnapped. On November 9, a grand jury indicted Hugh Basil Banghart (a.k.a. Larry Green), Charles "Ice Wagon" Conners (a.k.a. Eugene Crotty), and August John Lamar (a.k.a. Albert J. Kator, a.k.a. Louis La Mar) for participating in the Factor kidnapping. Banghart was captured in Baltimore, Maryland, on February 11. Arrested with him was Isaac "Ike" Costner.

Immediately after Touhy's acquittal for the Hamm kidnapping, federal authorities arrested Touhy, McFadden, Schaefer, and Sharkey on charges of kidnapping Factor. Schaefer and Sharkey were also arrested for robbing the mail in Milwaukee in January 1933. Willie Sharkey, who had twice exhibited irrational behavior during the Hamm trial, committed suicide by hanging on November 30.

Touhy's trial in the kidnapping of Jake Factor opened on January 16, 1934. Thomas Courtney, Minnesota state's attorney prosecuting the case, convinced President Franklin D. Roosevelt to not deport Factor in the interest of law enforcement. (Note: The Supreme Court of the United States ruled on December 4, 1933, that there was no legal bar to Factor's extradition to the United Kingdom.) The prosecution called six eyewitnesses who claimed they saw Touhy and his co-defendants kidnap Factor. Factor himself testified at the trial. Now claiming that his blindfold had slipped one day, he accused Touhy of being his kidnapper. Under cross-examination, Factor was confronted with the fact that he'd failed to identify any of the four co-defendants in July 1933. Factor now claimed that he'd been told not to by Capt. Daniel Gilbert. Touhy was able to provide an alibi for the night of Factor's kidnapping, with several neighbors testifying that he had sat on his front porch conversing. The jury deadlocked, and a mistrial was declared on February 2, 1934.

A second trial began on February 13, 1934. Charges were inexplicably dropped against Connors, and charges against McFadden dropped as nol pressed. Banghart and Costner were brought to Chicago to testify in the case. Costner turned state's evidence and completely corroborated Factor's accusations. (Note: The prosecution dropped all charges against Costner in exchange for his evidence.) Banghart testified for the defense. Banghart claimed that Jake Factor had recruited him and others to fake Factor's kidnapping as a way of helping Factor avoid deportation, and Banghart was paid $50,000 for his trouble. Factor and others then began framing Touhy and his gang for the kidnapping. A police officer who saw Factor minutes after he claimed to be freed claimed Factor was clean-shaven and his clothes in good appearance (even though Factor said he'd slept in his clothes for nearly two weeks and not been allowed to shower or shave). The press reported that the judge and jury giggled at Banghart's testimony, and that even Touhy's defense attorney hid a smile at how ridiculous it seemed. The jury convicted Touhy and his co-defendants in just four hours, and deliberated the penalty for another six. Deciding against death, the jury imposed a life sentence on all three men. They would be eligible for parole in 33 years.

Basil Banghart was tried separately in the kidnapping of Jake Factor. He was convicted on March 13, 1934, and sentenced to 99 years in prison as well. The day he was convicted, Charles Connors was found murdered (allegedly by gangland thugs) in the Forest Preserve area of Cook County, Illinois.

== Incarceration ==
=== Appeals ===
Touhy was incarcerated at Stateville Correctional Center in Illinois. Touhy immediately filed an appeal. Over the next eight years, he spent most of his bootlegger's fortune on legal fees.

On October 9, 1942, Touhy and six other men escaped from Stateville prison. After a month, Touhy and the others were discovered living in a Chicago boarding house. Touhy and three others surrendered peacefully. The remaining two escapees tried to fight their way out and were killed. Touhy re-entered Stateville on December 31, 1942, and was sentenced to an additional 199 years in prison for the escape.

In 1944, 20th Century Fox released a semi-biographical and highly fictionalized film based on Touhy's life, title Roger Touhy, Gangster. Touhy successfully sued the studio for defamation of character (after six years, he won a judgment of $15,000), but Fox was able to distribute the film overseas without legal repercussions.

On August 9, 1954, Federal District Court Judge John Barnes set Touhy free. The ruling was the culmination of an appeal Touhy began in 1948. The Court found that Capt. Gilbert had induced Costner to perjur himself, that Gilbert had held back critical evidence of Touhy's innocence, that Courtney (now a state circuit judge) had presumably had knowledge of Costner's perjury, that multiple Illinois state attorneys had engaged in other prosecutorial misconduct, and that it was now widely known that Factor's kidnapping had been faked. The State of Minnesota appealed the ruling, arguing that Touhy had not exhausted his state appeals before filing his federal appeal. Touhy was released on August 10, 1954, but the United States Court of Appeals for the Seventh Circuit ordered him returned to prison after just 48 hours of freedom while the appeal was pending. On August 30, the Seventh Circuit declined Touhy's bid for habeas corpus, ruling he should remain in prison until the state's appeal was fully heard. The U.S. Supreme Court declined to hear Touhy's appeal on February 14, 1955, and did not accept his writ of habeas corpus.

=== Release ===
While the state's appeal was still pending, Governor William Stratton commuted Touhy's two sentences on July 31, 1957. Stratton reduced the 99-year sentence to 72 years, and reduced the 199-year sentence to three years. Touhy won parole on the kidnapping charge on February 20, 1958. Touhy's three-year sentence for escape began running after his kidnapping parole. He was eligible for parole after serving a third of the sentence, and was granted parole on November 12, 1959. Touhy left Statesville Prison on November 24, 1959, having served exactly 25 years and nine months. He lived with his sister, Ethel Alesia, at 125 N. Lotus Avenue in Chicago.

Touhy's autobiography, The Stolen Years, was published in the fall of 1959. John Factor sued Touhy for libel for the statements published in the book.

== Death ==
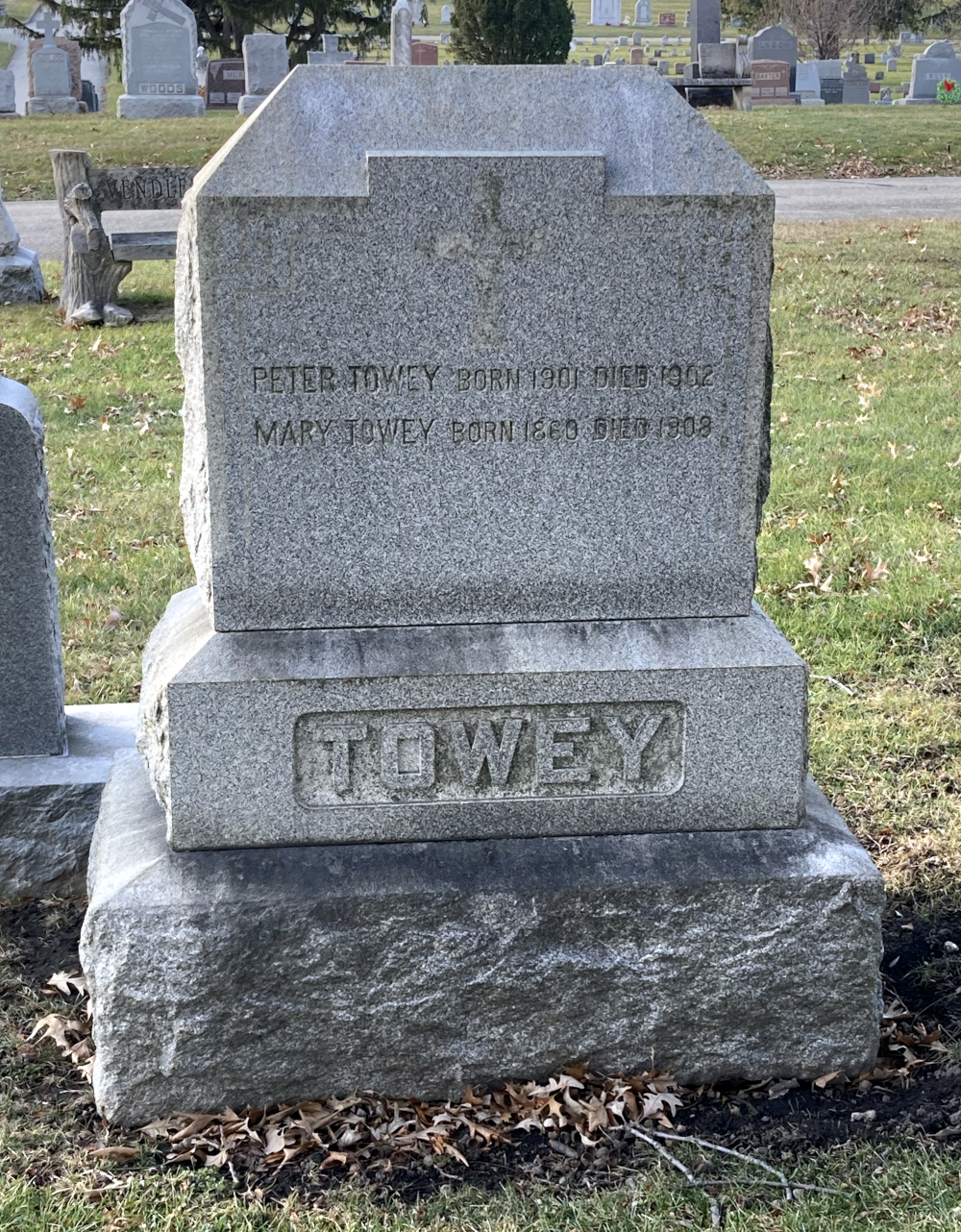
Family plot at Mount Carmel Cemetery

At 10:30 P.M. on December 16, 1959, Touhy and Walter Miller, a retired Chicago police detective who served as his bodyguard, were gunned down as they entered the Alesia house. Two or three men stepped out of shadows as Touhy and Miller mounted the steps to the front door. Miller identified himself as a police officer, and the men pulled 12 gauge shotguns from beneath their overcoats. Touhy was struck in the left leg above the knee, and in the right leg below the knee. Miller was shot three times in the arms and legs. Miller was able to pull his revolver and fire five shots. Miller was taken to Loretto Hospital in critical condition. Touhy was taken to St. Anne's Hospital, where he died an hour later on the operating table from loss of blood. He received last rites a few minutes before he died. As Touhy was moved into an oxygen tent, he told medical and police bystanders, "I've been expecting it. The bastards never forget." The hitman duo of Charles Nicoletti and Felix Alderisio are considered the likely culprits.

Clara Touhy and her son Thomas buried Roger Touhy in a quiet, secret graveside service at Mount Carmel Cemetery in Hillside, Illinois, on Friday, December 18. No clergy or police were present. (Note: The burial site is in the Towey family plot. Towey is the spelling of the family name before it was changed.)

== Personal life ==
Roger Touhy claimed he ran afoul of the law only twice before the Hamm kidnapping case. The first time was when he received a traffic ticket for speeding in Chicago, and the second was when a court in Florida found him guilty for discharging a firearm on his property.

On April 22, 1922, Roger and Clara Touhy wed. Clara was a 23-year-old telegraph operator, whose maiden name or surname has been given as Morgan or Disque (varying sources). The couple's first child died in infancy. They then had two children, both boys: Roger Scott Touhy (1925–2006) and Thomas Touhy (born c. 1927). Touhy claimed to have sent his children to college while in prison, one attending the University of Florida and the other Stetson University. Both worked in the construction industry for a time. By 1959, Thomas was working as a police officer and going to law school. Touhy's wife and sons lived under assumed names in Forest Park, Illinois at the time of Touhy's release.

At one time, Touhy owned a small farm and home in Des Plaines, Illinois, as well as a home on a large piece of property in Florida. While in prison, Touhy sued 20th Century Fox for $100,000 for libeling him in the motion picture Roger Touhy, Gangster. The parties settled out of court, with Touhy receiving $15,000 in damages. At the time of his death, however, Touhy had no property, and only $35,000 in cash and some furniture in storage. Clara and her sons relied on the potential royalties from his autobiography for income.

=== Post-death legal cases ===
Jake Factor's libel suit against Touhy was dismissed due to Touhy's death. Factor then sued autobiography co-author Ray Brennan, KCOP-TV, KCOP reporter Tom Duggan, and the two publishers of Touhy's book for a combined $4 million for libel in January 1960. The outcome of that case is not known.

In August 1961, Clara and Thomas Touhy filed a $2 million defamation and libel suit against CBS for airing a program about Roger Touhy that included their names. The outcome of that case is not known.

In 1979, Roger Scott Touhy filed suit against 20th Century Fox for breaching the 1949 agreement between the studio and his father, Roger Touhy. The son claimed the agreement barred Fox from distributing the motion picture Roger Touhy, Gangster in the United States. A court found in favor of 20th Century Fox.

== Legal legacy ==
Roger Touhy filed a habeas corpus proceeding in federal District Court against Ragen, the warden of Stateville Prison, alleging he was restrained in violation of the Due Process Clause. As part of this proceeding, in 1949 he subpoenaed FBI agent George McSwain to provide documents showing his kidnapping conviction was based on conspiracy and fraud. McSwain refused, citing Justice Department policy. While the District Court held McSwain in contempt for defying the subpoena, the 7th Circuit Court of Appeals and the US Supreme Court disagreed, both holding that McSwain's refusal was legal. Thereafter, the proper protocols for subpoenaing a federal agent to appear in court have variously been known as Touhy regulations, Touhy letters, Touhy requests or the Touhy process.

== See also ==
- List of homicides in Illinois § Organized crime

== Bibliography ==
- Allerfeldt, Kristofer (2018). Organized Crime in the United States, 1865-1941. Jefferson, N.C.: McFarland & Co. ISBN 9781476670652.
- Allsop, Kenneth (1961). The Bootleggers and Their Era. Garden City, N.Y.: Doubleday. OCLC 1154939.
- Bair, Deirdre (2016). Al Capone: His Life, Legacy, and Legend. New York: Nan A. Talese/Doubleday. ISBN 9780385537155.
- Bremner, Robert H.; Reichard, Gary W. (1982). Reshaping America: Society and Institutions, 1945-1960. Columbus, Ohio: Ohio State University Press. ISBN 9780814203088.
- Breuer, William B. (1995). J. Edgar Hoover and His G-Men. Westport, Conn.: Praeger. ISBN 9780275949907.
- Cohen, Andrew Wender (2004). The Racketeer's Progress: Chicago and the Struggle of the Modern American Economy, 1900-1940. Cambridge, UK: Cambridge University Press. ISBN 9780521834667.
- Cohen, Daniel (1989). The Encyclopedia of Unsolved Crimes. New York: Dorset Press. ISBN 9780880294430.
- Dale, Elizabeth (2016). Robert Nixon and Police Torture in Chicago, 1871-1971. DeKalb, Ill.: Northern Illinois University Press. ISBN 9780875807393.
- Eghigian, Mars (2006). After Capone: The Real Untold Life and World of Chicago Mob Boss Frank 'the Enforcer' Nitti. Nashville: Cumberland House. ISBN 9781581824544.
- Eig, Jonathan (2010). Get Capone: The Secret Plot That Captured America's Most Wanted Gangster. New York: Simon & Schuster. ISBN 9781416580591.
- Erickson, Gladys A. (1957). Warden Ragen of Joliet. New York: Dutton. OCLC 850990162.
- Ferraro, Thomas E. (2012). Niles: The Early Years. Charleston, S.C.: Arcadia Publishing. ISBN 9780738583068.
- Frethem, Deborah; Smith, Cynthia Schreiner (2020). Alvin Karpis and the Barker Gang in Minnesota. Charleston, S.C.: The History Press. ISBN 9781467146227.
- Hartley, Robert E. (2013). Battleground 1948: Truman, Stevenson, Douglas, and the Most Surprising Election in Illinois History. Carbondale, Ill.: Southern Illinois University Press. ISBN 9780809332663.
- Herion, Don (2017). Touhy vs. Capone: The Chicago Outfit's Biggest Frame Job. Charleston, S.C.: The History Press. ISBN 9781625858931.
- Horwitt, Sanford D. (1992). Let Them Call Me Rebel: Saul Alinsky, His Life and Legacy. New York: Vintage Books. ISBN 9780679734185.
- Humble, Ron (2008). Frank Nitti: The True Story of Chicago's Infamous Enforcer. Fort Lee, N.J.: Barricade Books. ISBN 9781569803424.
- Iorizzo, Luciano (2003). Al Capone: A Biography. Westport, Conn.: Greenwood Press. ISBN 9780313323171.
- Johnson, Curt; Sautter, R. Craig (1998). The Wicked City: Chicago from Kenna to Capone. New York: Da Capo Press. ISBN 9780306808210.
- Kantrowitz, Nathan (1996). Close Control: Managing a Maximum Security Prison: The Story of Ragen's Stateville Penitentiary. Guilderland, N.Y.: Harrow and Heston. ISBN 9780911577310.
- Kraus, Joe (2019). The Kosher Capones: A History of Chicago's Jewish Gangsters. Ithaca, N.Y.: Cornell University Press. ISBN 9781501747311.
- Kyvig, David E. (2000). Repealing National Prohibition. Kent, Ohio: Kent State University Press. ISBN 9780873386722.
- LaFrance, Peter (2013). "Beer". In Smith, Andrew F. (ed.). The Oxford Encyclopedia of Food and Drink in America. New York: Oxford University Press. ISBN 9780199734962.
- Lindberg, Richard (1999). Return to the Scene of the Crime: A Guide to Infamous Places in Chicago. Nashville: Cumberland House. ISBN 9781581820133.
- Lyle, John Homer (1960). The Dry and Lawless Years. New York: Prentice-Hall. OCLC 1063120234.
- Maccabee, Paul (1995). John Dillinger Slept Here: A Crooks' Tour of Crime and Corruption in St. Paul, 1920-1936. St. Paul, Minn.: Minnesota Historical Society Press. ISBN 9780873513159.
- MacNee, Marie J.; Hoehner, Jane (1998). Outlaws, Mobsters and Crooks. Volume 3: Bandits and gunslingers, bootleggers, pirates: From the Old West to the Internet. Detroit: UXL. ISBN 9780787628062.
- Mahoney, Timothy R. (2013). Secret Partners: Big Tom Brown and the Barker Gang. St. Paul, Minn.: Minnesota Historical Society Press. ISBN 9780873519045.
- Mayer, Milton (1964). 'What Can a Man Do?': A Selection of His Most Challenging Writings. Chicago: University of Chicago Press. OCLC 1388877.
- McKinley, James (1977). Assassination in America. New York: Harper & Row. ISBN 9780060129514.
- Mooney, Martin (1939). The Parole Scandal. Los Angeles: Lymanhouse. OCLC 3316493.
- Murray, George (1965). The Madhouse on Madison Street. Chicago: Follett Publishing Co. OCLC 12083633.
- Myers, Peter L.; Isralowitz, Richard (2011). Alcohol. Santa Barbara, Calif.: Greenwood Press. ISBN 9780313372476.
- Nash, Jay Robert (1973). Bloodletters and Badmen: A Narrative Encyclopedia of American Criminals From the Pilgrims to the Present. New York: M. Evans and Company. ISBN 9780871311139.
- Nash, Jay Robert (1989). Encyclopedia of World Crime: Criminal Justice, Criminology, and Law Enforcement. Vol. 1: A—C. Wilmette, Ill.: CrimeBooks. ISBN 9780923582005.
- Nash, Jay Robert (1989). Encyclopedia of World Crime: Criminal Justice, Criminology, and Law Enforcement. Vol. 4: S-Z; Supplements. Wilmette, Ill.: CrimeBooks. ISBN 9780923582005.
- Newell, Barbara Warne (1961). Chicago and the Labor Movement. Urbana, Ill.: University of Illinois Press. OCLC 1011819822.
- Newton, Michael (2002). The Encyclopedia of Kidnappings. New York: Facts on File. ISBN 9780816044863.
- Newton, Michael (2012). The FBI Encyclopedia. Jefferson, N.C.: McFarland Publishing. ISBN 9780786466207.
- Newton, Michael (2015). Famous Assassinations in World History: An Encyclopedia. Santa Barbara, Calif.: ABC-CLIO. ISBN 9781610692854.
- Purvis, Alston; Tresniowski, Alex (2005). The Vendetta: Special Agent Melvin Purvis, John Dillinger, and Hoover's FBI in the Age of Gangsters. New York: Public Affairs. ISBN 9781586487416.
- Ronnenberg, Herman Wiley (2016) [2011]. Material Culture of Breweries. New York: Routledge. ISBN 9781598741674.
- Russo, Gus (2008) [2001]. The Outfit: The Role of Chicago's Underworld in the Shaping of Modern America. London: Bloomsbury. ISBN 9781596918979.
- Sifakis, Carl (2005). The Mafia Encyclopedia. New York: Facts on File. ISBN 9780816056941.
- Stout, David (2020). The Kidnap Years: The Astonishing True History of the Forgotten Kidnapping Epidemic That Shook Depression-Era America. Naperville, Ill.: SourceBooks. ISBN 9781492694793.
- Taylor, Troy (2009). Murder and Mayhem on Chicago's West Side. Charleston, S.C.: The History Press. ISBN 9781596296930.
- Thompson, Julie A. (2019). The Hunt for the Last Public Enemy in Northeastern Ohio: Alvin "Creepy" Karpis and His Road to Alcatraz. Charleston, S.C.: The History Press. ISBN 9781467138208.
- Touhy, Roger (1959). The Stolen Years. with Ray Brennan. Cleveland: The Pennington Press. OCLC 1074414365.
- Underhill, Robert (2015). Criminals and Folk Heroes: Gangsters and the FBI in the 1930s. New York: Algora Publishing. ISBN 9781628941388.
- Witwer, David Scott (2003). Corruption and Reform in the Teamsters Union. Urbana, Ill.: University of Illinois Press. ISBN 9780252028250.
- Witwer, David Scott (Summer 2003). "The Scandal of George Scalise: A Case Study in the Rise of Labor Racketeering in the 1930s". Journal of Social History. 36 (4): 917–940. doi:10.1353/jsh.2003.0121. JSTOR 3790357. S2CID 143544135.
- Witwer, David Scott (2009). Shadow of the Racketeer: Scandal in Organized Labor. Urbana, Ill.: University of Illinois Press. ISBN 9780252034176.
- Witwer, David Scott; Rios, Catherine (2019). Murder in the Garment District: The Grip of Organized Crime and the Decline of Labor in the United States. New York: The New Press. ISBN 9781620974636.
- Woodiwiss, Michael (1988). Crime, Crusades and Corruption: Prohibitions in the United States, 1900-1987. London: Pinter Publishers. ISBN 9780861879809.
