= John Factor =

American gangster (1892–1984)

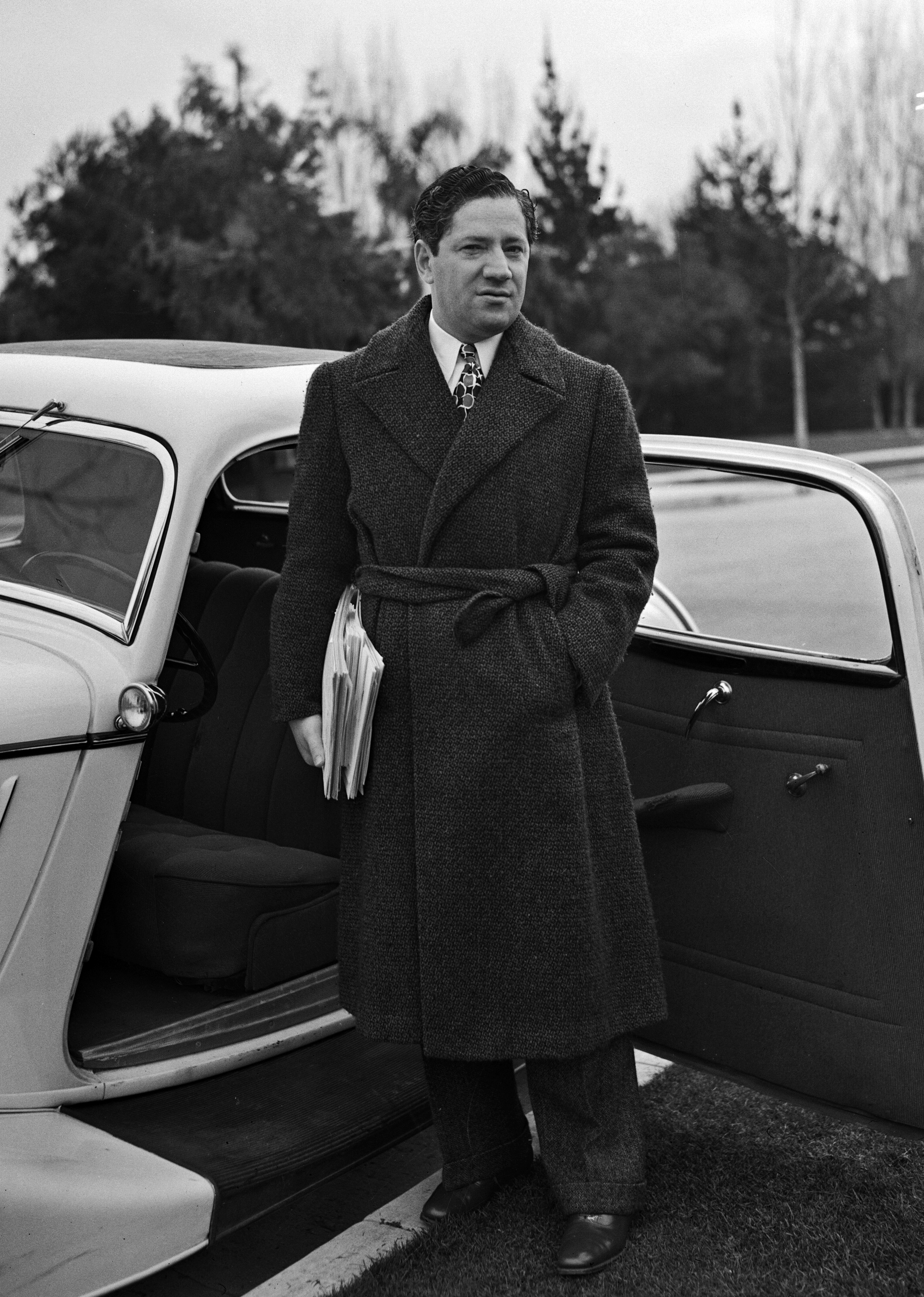
- Factor in 1936
- Born: Iakov Faktorowicz; October 8, 1892; Łódź, Congress Poland
- Died: January 22, 1984 (aged 91); Los Angeles, California, U.S.
- Other name: Jake the Barber
- Occupations: Stock investor, casino operator, real estate investor, philanthropist
- Spouse: Rella
- Relatives: Max Factor Sr. (half-brother)
- Convictions: Stock fraud (United Kingdom); Mail fraud (U.S.)
- Penalty: 10 years in federal prison (U.S.)

John Factor (October 8, 1892 – January 22, 1984), born Iakov Faktorowicz and widely known as Jake "The Barber" Factor, was a Prohibition-era gangster and con artist affiliated with the Chicago Outfit.

== Biography ==
Factor was born Iakov Faktorowicz on October 8, 1892, in Łódź, Congress Poland, to Avrum (Abraham) Iakov Faktorowicz and his wife, Leah. His father was a rabbi, and he had one sibling, a sister, Dena. His family left Poland before the Bolshevik revolution and refused to register for citizenship in Stalin's USSR, thus forfeiting their Russian citizenship and leaving them stateless. Like his more-famous older half-brother, Max Factor, he had trained at an early age in haircare, which led to his mob nickname "Jake the Barber". The family emigrated to the United States in 1906. They joined his elder brother, Nathan, in St. Louis, Missouri.

In 1926, Factor perpetrated a massive stock fraud in England that netted $8 million (equivalent to $113,172,000 in 2024). Some of his victims were members of the British royal family. He subsequently fled to Monaco and executed another major scam, rigging the tables at the Monte Carlo Casino and breaking the bank. He then returned to the United States.

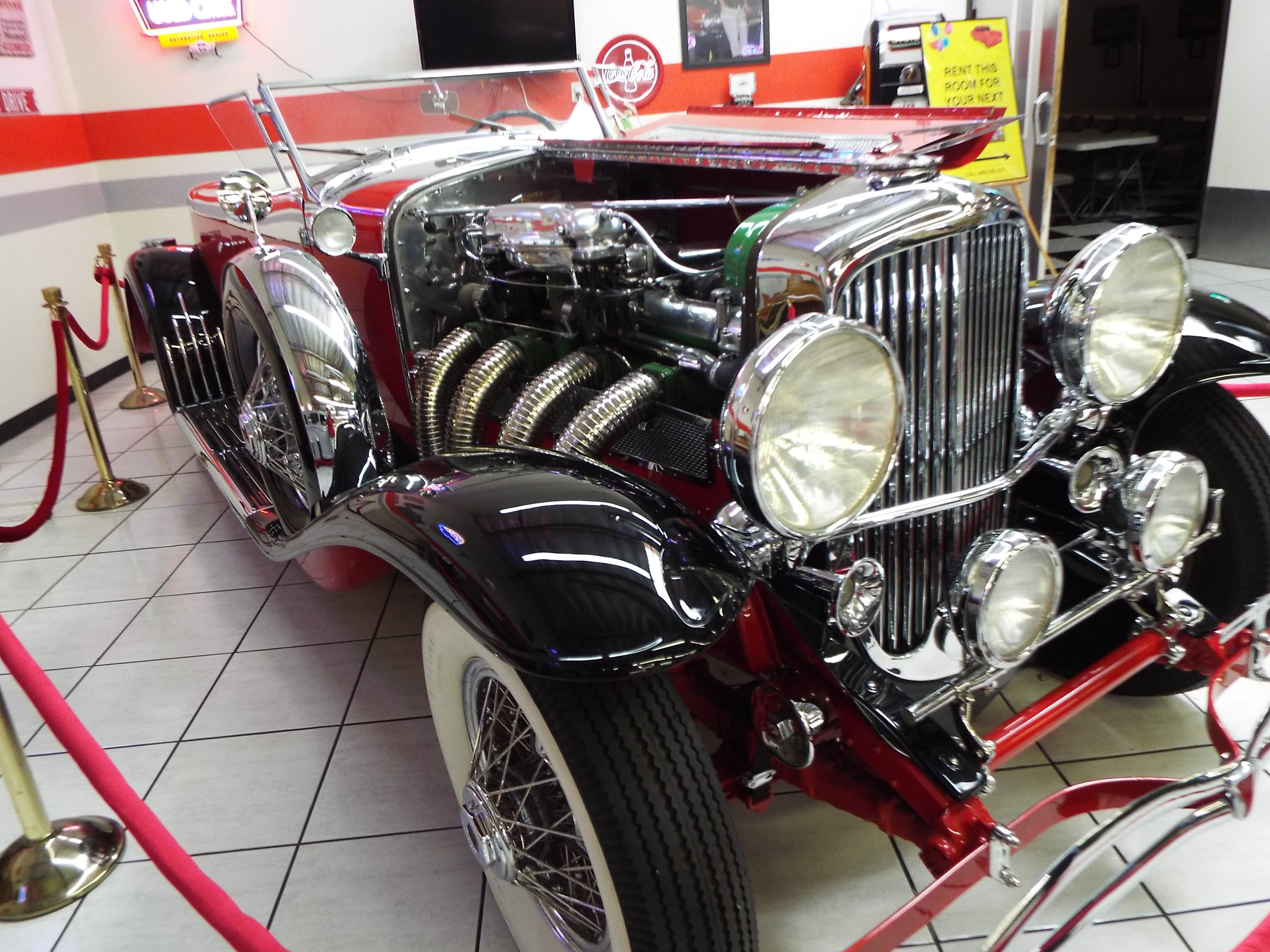
1930 Duesenberg Boattail Speedster once owned by John Factor, and on display in the Martin Auto Museum.

While in the United States, he was tried and sentenced in absentia in England to 24 years in prison. He fought extradition all the way to the U.S. Supreme Court, which heard oral argument on April 18, 1933. Factor's son, Jerome, was kidnapped the same day, and some believe this was staged. Eight days later, Factor himself and several members of the Chicago Outfit (with whom Factor was associated) saw Jerome in a car. They gave chase and freed him, while the kidnappers got away. Again, some believe this was staged. As Factor was trying to free his son, the Supreme Court held the case over for reargument on October 9.

Some claim that, fearing he would lose the case, Factor had himself "kidnapped" on June 30, 1933. Factor reappeared on July 12, and his family claimed they had given the kidnappers a $50,000 ransom. The FBI believed Jerome's kidnapping was genuine and that the pending extradition made Factor avoid contact with law enforcement. They believe this avoidance was the reason Touhy chose him as the second kidnap victim. This time, however, the kidnapping was reported and had to be investigated. When found, Factor had been burned and beaten.

Some claim Factor, working closely with the Chicago Outfit and corrupt local law enforcement, framed local Irish mob boss and Outfit mortal enemy Roger Touhy for the kidnapping. Touhy was tried for the kidnapping. The jury in the first trial was dismissed before reaching a verdict. The second jury convicted him, and Touhy lost his case on appeal. On his release from jail, Touhy published a book claiming the kidnappings were faked and he had been jailed unjustly. Factor sued him, his publisher, his printer and his ghostwriter. The case was dismissed because Factor was discovered to have been a stateless person when he filed the case, and thus unable to sue.

Factor lost his extradition battle when, on December 4, 1933. The Supreme Court held in Factor v. Laubenheimer, 290 U.S. 276 (Sup.Ct. 1933). that Factor should be turned over to British authorities. He was taken into custody on April 17, 1934. On June 27, 1934 Factor's wife, Rella, then asked a U.S. federal district court to dismiss the extradition on the grounds that Factor had been held for longer than the two months permitted for extradition proceedings under U.S. law. The United States Secretary of State, acting on a request by local law enforcement, intervened in the case, asking the court to release Factor because he might be needed as a witness in further legal proceedings against Touhy. The Secretary of State declined to exercise his discretion under the law to toll the case. The 7th Circuit Court of Appeals ordered Factor released and extradition proceedings quashed in In re Factor's Extradition, 75 F.2d 10 (7th Cir. 1934).

Factor was convicted of mail fraud in 1942, and served six years of a 10-year sentence.

In 1955, Factor took over the running of the Stardust Hotel on the Las Vegas Strip, allegedly as a front man for the Chicago Outfit. He sold the hotel for $7 million in either 1962 or 1963. It is alleged that when Factor ran the casino, it made between $50–$200 million. He was also involved in an attempt to bail out Jimmy Hoffa from his real-estate related financial problems.

Factor became politically and philanthropically active, and was the largest donor to John F. Kennedy's 1960 presidential campaign. In late 1962, Factor was again scheduled to be deported to the United Kingdom but received a presidential pardon. He contributed $25,000 to a committee fund that paid the ransom for the release of those captured during the Bay of Pigs invasion in Cuba. Attorney General Bobby Kennedy had offered him a pardon in exchange for this donation. He became a naturalized American citizen in 1963. He became a major contributor to the gubernatorial campaigns of Pat Brown in California. Brown later called him a close friend.

He lived his later years in Los Angeles, where he made large charitable contributions to enhance the lives of inner city children.

Factor died from a long, undisclosed illness on January 22, 1984, and was interred at the Hollywood Forever Cemetery in Los Angeles.

== See also ==
- List of people pardoned or granted clemency by the president of the United States

== Bibliography ==
- Al, Stefan (2017). The Strip: Las Vegas and the Architecture of the American Dream. Cambridge, Mass.: The MIT Press. ISBN 9780262035743.
- Eghigian, Mars (2005). After Capone: The Real Untold Life and World of Chicago Mob Boss Frank 'the Enforcer' Nitti. Nashville: Cumberland House. ISBN 9781581824544.
- Newton, Michael (2002). The Encyclopedia of Kidnappings. New York: Facts on File. ISBN 9780816044863.
- Newton, Michael (2007). Mr. Mob: The Life and Crimes of Moe Dalitz. Jefferson, N.C.: McFarland & Co. ISBN 9780786453627.
- Russo, Gus (2004). The Outfit: The Role of Chicago's Underworld in the Shaping of Modern America. London: Bloomsbury. ISBN 9780747566519.
- Stout, David (2020). The Kidnap Years: The Astonishing True History of the Forgotten Kidnapping Epidemic That Shook Depression-Era America. Naperville, Ill.: SourceBooks. ISBN 9781492694793.
- Tuohy, John William (2001). When Capone's Mob Murdered Roger Touhy: The Strange Case of "Jake the Barber" and the Kidnapping That Never Happened. Fort Lee, N.J.: Barricade Books. ISBN 9781569801741.
