= List of elections in 1826 =

The following elections occurred in the year 1826.

- 1826 Argentine presidential election
- 1826 Chilean parliamentary election
- 1826 Chilean presidential election
- 1826 Norwegian parliamentary election
- 1826 Portuguese legislative election

== North America ==
=== United States ===
- 1826 United States elections

==== United States Senate ====
- 1826 and 1827 United States Senate elections
- 1826 United States Senate election in Pennsylvania

==== United States House of Representatives ====
- 1826 and 1827 United States House of Representatives elections

==== United States lieutenant gubernatorial ====
- 1826 Connecticut lieutenant gubernatorial election
- 1826 Illinois lieutenant gubernatorial election

==== United States gubernatorial ====
- 1826 Connecticut gubernatorial election
- 1826 Delaware gubernatorial election
- 1826 Illinois gubernatorial election
- 1826 Maine gubernatorial election
- 1826 Maryland gubernatorial election
- 1826 Massachusetts gubernatorial election
- 1826 New Hampshire gubernatorial election
- 1826 New Jersey gubernatorial election
- 1826 New York gubernatorial election
- 1826 North Carolina gubernatorial election
- 1826 Ohio gubernatorial election
- 1826 Pennsylvania gubernatorial election
- 1826 Rhode Island gubernatorial election
- 1826 South Carolina gubernatorial election
- 1826 Vermont gubernatorial election
- 1826 Virginia gubernatorial election

==== United States mayoral elections ====
- 1826 Boston mayoral election

== Europe ==
=== United Kingdom ===
- 1826 United Kingdom general election

== South America ==
=== Argentina ===
- 1826 Argentine presidential election

== See also ==
- Category:1826 elections
