= Illinois gubernatorial elections =

This is a list of the Illinois gubernatorial elections since 1818, as follows:

== 2022 ==
2022 Illinois gubernatorial election
Party	Candidate	Votes	%	±%
Democratic	J. B. Pritzker (incumbent)	2,253,748	54.91%	+0.38%
Republican	Darren Bailey	1,739,095	42.37%	+3.54%
Libertarian	Scott Schluter	111,712	2.72%	+0.32%
Write-in		81	0.0%	-0.01%
Total votes		4,104,636	100.00%	
Democratic hold				

== 2018 ==
2018 Illinois gubernatorial election
Party	Candidate	Votes	%	±%
Democratic	J. B. Pritzker	2,479,746	54.53%	+8.18%
Republican	Bruce Rauner (incumbent)	1,765,751	38.83%	−11.44%
Conservative	Sam McCann	192,527	4.23%	N/A
Libertarian	Kash Jackson	109,518	2.40%	−0.95%
Write-in		115	0.01%	-0.02%
Total votes		4,547,657	100.00%	N/A
Democratic gain from Republican				

== 2014 ==
2014 Illinois gubernatorial election
Party	Candidate	Votes	%	±%
Republican	Bruce Rauner / Evelyn Sanguinetti	1,823,627	50.27%	
Democratic	Pat Quinn (incumbent) / Paul Vallas	1,681,343	46.35%	
Libertarian	Chad Grimm / Alex Cummings	121,534	3.35%	
Write-In	Write-ins	1,186	0.03%	0.03%
Majority		142,284	3.92%	
Total votes		3,627,690	100.00%	
Republican gain from Democratic				

== 2010 ==
2010 Illinois gubernatorial election
Party	Candidate	Votes	%	±%
Democratic	Pat Quinn / Sheila Simon (incumbent)	1,721,812	46.79%	−3.2
Republican	Bill Brady / Jason Plummer	1,702,399	45.94%	+6.8
Independent	Scott Lee Cohen / Baxter B. Swilley	134,219	3.64%	+3.6%
Green	Rich Whitney / Don W. Crawford	99,625	2.70%	−7.7
Libertarian	Lex Green / Ed Rutledge	34,293	.9%	+1.0
Plurality		19,413	0.5%	
Total votes		3,692,348	100.00%	
Democratic hold				

== 2006 ==
2006 Illinois gubernatorial election
Party	Candidate	Votes	%	±%
Democratic	Rod Blagojevich/Pat Quinn (incumbent)	1,736,731	49.79%	−2.4%
Republican	Judy Baar Topinka/Joe Birkett	1,369,315	39.26%	−5.8%
Green	Rich Whitney/Julie Samuels	361,336	10.36%	+10.4%
Constitution	Randy Stufflebeam/Randy A. White (Write-in)	19,020	0.5%	+0.5%
	Other Write-ins	1,111	0.03%	+0.03
Write-In	Mark Robert McCoy	476	0.01%	+0.01
Plurality		367,537	10.5%	
Total votes		3,486,671	100.0%	
Democratic hold				

== 2002 ==
2002 Illinois gubernatorial election
Party	Candidate	Votes	%	±%
Democratic	Rod Blagojevich/Pat Quinn	1,818,823	52.19%	+4.5
Republican	Jim Ryan/Carl Hawkins	1,582,604	45.07%	−5.8
Libertarian	Cal Skinner/James Tobin	73,404	2.1	+2.09
Independent	Marisellis Brown	22,803	0.65	+0.7
Majority		236,219	6.8	
Total votes		3,497,634	100.00	
Democratic gain from Republican				

== 1998 ==
1998 Illinois gubernatorial election
Party	Candidate	Votes	%	±%
Republican	George Ryan/Corinne Wood	1,714,094	51.03%	−12.9%
Democratic	Glenn Poshard/Mary Lou Kearns	1,594,191	47.46%	+13.4%
Reform	Lawrence Redmond/Philomena Nirchi	50,372	1.5%	+1.50%
Majority		119,903	3.2%	
Total votes		3,358,657	100.0%	
Republican hold				

== 1994 ==
1994 Illinois gubernatorial election
Party	Candidate	Votes	%	±%
Republican	Jim Edgar (incumbent)	1,984,318	63.87%	+13.1%
Democratic	Dawn Clark Netsch	1,069,850	34.44%	−13.8%
Libertarian	David L. Kelley	52,388	1.69%	+1.69%
N/A	write-ins	10	0.0%	+0.0%
Majority		914,468	29.5%	
Total votes		3,106,556		
Republican hold				

== 1990 ==
1990 Illinois gubernatorial election
Party	Candidate	Votes	%	±%
Republican	Jim Edgar	1,653,126	50.75%	−1.92%
Democratic	Neil Hartigan	1,569,217	48.17%	+41.53%
Illinois Solidarity	Jessie Fields	35,067	1.08%	−38.89%
Majority		83,909	2.58%	−10.12%
Total votes		3,257,410		
Republican hold				

== 1986 ==
1986 Illinois gubernatorial election
Party	Candidate	Votes	%	±%
Republican	James R. Thompson (incumbent)	1,655,849	52.67%	+3.23%
Illinois Solidarity	Adlai Stevenson III	1,256,626	39.97%	−9.33%
Democratic	No candidate	208,830	6.64%	+6.64%
Libertarian	Gary L. Shilts	15,646	0.50%	−0.16%
Socialist	Diane Roling	6,843	0.22%	+0.22%
Majority		399,223	12.70%	
Total votes		3,143,794	100.00%	
Republican hold				

== 1982 ==
1982 Illinois gubernatorial election
Party	Candidate	Votes	%	±%
Republican	James R. Thompson (incumbent)	1,816,101	49.44%	−9.60%
Democratic	Adlai Stevenson III	1,811,027	49.30%	+9.20%
Libertarian	Bea Armstrong	24,417	0.66%	
Taxpayers	John E. Roche	22,001	0.60%	
Write-In	Write-ins	161	0.00%	+0.00%
Majority		5,074	0.14%	−18.80%
Total votes		3,673,707	100.00%	
Republican hold				

== 1978 ==
1978 Illinois gubernatorial election
Party	Candidate	Votes	%	±%
Republican	James R. Thompson (incumbent)	1,859,684	59.04%	
Democratic	Michael Bakalis	1,263,134	40.10%	
Libertarian	Georgia Shields	11,420	0.36%	
Socialist Workers	Cecil Lampkin	11,026	0.35%	
U.S. Labor	Melvin Klenetsky	4,737	0.15%	
Write-In	Write-ins	106	0.00	
Majority		596,550	18.94%	−11.03%
Total votes		3,150,107	100.00%	
Republican hold				

== 1976 ==
1976 Illinois gubernatorial election
Party	Candidate	Votes	%	±%
Republican	James R. Thompson	3,000,365	64.68%	
Democratic	Michael J. Howlett	1,610,258	34.71%	
Communist	Ishmael Flory	10,091	0.22%	
Libertarian	F. Joseph McCaffrey	7,552	0.16%	
Socialist Workers	Suzanne Haig	4,926	0.11%	
Socialist Labor	George LaForest	3,147	0.07%	
U.S. Labor	Edward Waffle	2,302	0.05%	
Write-In	Write-ins	369	0.01%	
Majority		1,390,137	29.97%	
Total votes		4,639,040	100.00%	
Republican gain from Democratic				

== 1972 ==
1972 Illinois gubernatorial election
Party	Candidate	Votes	%	±%
Democratic	Dan Walker	2,372,313	50.68	+2.31
Republican	Richard B. Ogilvie (incumbent)	2,293,809	49.02	−2.19
Socialist Labor	George LaForest	7,966	0.17	−0.26
Communist	Ishmael Flory	4,592	0.10	N/A
N/A	write-ins	1,373	0.03	N/A
Majority		77,494	1.66	−1.18
Turnout		4,679,043		
Democratic gain from Republican		Swing		

== 1968 ==
1968 Illinois gubernatorial election
Party	Candidate	Votes	%	±%
Republican	Richard B. Ogilvie	2,307,295	51.20	+3.12
Democratic	Samuel H. Shapiro (incumbent)	2,179,501	48.37	−3.55
Socialist Labor	Edward C. Gross	19,175	0.43	N/A
N/A	Write-ins	19,175	0.00	N/A
Majority		127,794	2.84	−1.01
Turnout		4,506,000		
Republican gain from Democratic		Swing		

== 1964 ==
1964 Illinois gubernatorial election
Party	Candidate	Votes	%	±%
Democratic	Otto Kerner (incumbent)	2,418,394	51.92	−3.59
Republican	Charles H. Percy	2,239,095	48.08	+3.78
N/A	Write-ins	11	0.00	N/A
Majority		179,299	3.85	−7.37
Turnout		4,657,500		
Democratic hold		Swing		

== 1960 ==
1960 Illinois gubernatorial election
Party	Candidate	Votes	%	±%
Democratic	Otto Kerner	2,594,731	55.51	+6.03
Republican	William G. Stratton (incumbent)	2,070,479	44.30	−6.04
Socialist Labor	Edward C. Gross	8,976	0.19	+0.01
Write-In	Write-ins	1	0.00	N/A
Majority		524,252	11.22	+10.37
Turnout		4,674,187		
Democratic gain from Republican		Swing		

== 1956 ==
1956 Illinois gubernatorial election
Party	Candidate	Votes	%	±%
Republican	William G. Stratton (incumbent)	2,171,786	50.34	−2.14
Democratic	Richard Austin	2,134,909	49.48	+2.16
Socialist Labor	Edward C. Gross	7,874	0.18	−0.02
Write-in	Write-ins	42	0.00	N/A
Majority		36,877	0.85	−4.31
Turnout		4,415,864		
Republican hold		Swing		

== 1952 ==
1952 Illinois gubernatorial election
Party	Candidate	Votes	%	±%
Republican	William G. Stratton	2,317,363	52.48	+9.89
Democratic	Sherwood Dixon	2,089,721	47.32	−9.78
Socialist Labor	Louis Fisher	8,777	0.20	+0.13
Write-In	Write-ins	3	0.00	N/A
Majority		227,642	5.16	−9.36
Turnout				
Republican gain from Democratic		Swing		

== 1948 ==
1948 Illinois gubernatorial election
Party	Candidate	Votes	%	±%
Democratic	Adlai Stevenson	2,250,074	57.10	
Republican	Dwight H. Green (incumbent)	1,678,007	42.59	
Prohibition	Willis Ray Wilson	9,491	0.24	+0.10
Socialist Labor	Louis Fisher	2,673	0.07	−0.10
Write-In	Write-ins	12	0.00	
Majority				
Turnout				
Democratic gain from Republican		Swing		

== 1944 ==
1944 Illinois gubernatorial election
Party	Candidate	Votes	%	±%
Republican	Dwight H. Green (incumbent)	2,013,270	50.75	
Democratic	Thomas J. Courtney	1,940,999	48.93	
Socialist Labor	Charles Storm	6,906	0.17	
Prohibition	Willis R. Wilson	5,590	0.14	−0.02
Majority				
Turnout				
Republican hold		Swing		

== 1940 ==
1940 Illinois gubernatorial election
Party	Candidate	Votes	%	±%
Republican	Dwight H. Green	2,197,778	52.93	
Democratic	Harry Hershey	1,940,833	46.74	
Socialist	Arthur G. McDowell	7,523	0.18	0.00
Prohibition	Clay F. Gaumer	6,467	0.16	+0.09
Write-In	Write-ins	21	0.00	0.00
Majority				
Turnout				
Republican gain from Democratic		Swing		

== 1936 ==
1936 Illinois gubernatorial election
Party	Candidate	Votes	%	±%
Democratic	Henry Horner (Incumbent)	2,067,861	53.16	
Republican	C. Wayland Brooks	1,680,685	43.21	
Independent	William Hale Thompson	128,962	3.32	
Prohibition	Harmon W. Reed	2,896	0.07	
Socialist Labor	O. Alfred Olson	2,602	0.07	
Socialist	John Fisher	6,966	0.18	
Write-In	Write-ins	4	0.00	
Majority				
Turnout				
Democratic hold		Swing		

== 1932 ==
1932 Illinois gubernatorial election
Party	Candidate	Votes	%	±%
Democratic	Henry Horner	1,930,330	57.62	
Republican	Len Small	1,364,043	40.71	
Socialist	Roy E. Burt	39,389	1.18	
Communist	Leonides McDonald	12,466	0.37	
Socialist Labor	J. E. Procum	2,896	0.09	
Independent	W. W. O'Brien	1,182	0.04	
Majority				
Turnout				
Democratic gain from Republican		Swing		

== 1928 ==
1928 Illinois gubernatorial election
Party	Candidate	Votes	%	±%
Republican	Louls L. Emmerson	1,709,818	56.76	
Democratic	Floyd E. Thompson	1,284,897	42.66	
Socialist	George Koop	12,974	0.43	
Communist	William F. Kruse	3,153	0.10	
Socialist Labor	J. E. Procum	1,361	0.05	
Majority				
Turnout				
Republican hold		Swing		

== 1924 ==
1924 Illinois gubernatorial election
Party	Candidate	Votes	%	±%
Republican	Len Small (incumbent)	1,366,446	56.72	
Democratic	Norman L. Jones	1,021,408	42.40	
Socialist	Andrew Lafin	15,191	0.63	
Communist	William F. Dunne	2,312	0.10	
Socialist Labor	Fred Koch	2,312	0.10	
Independent	James A. Logan	1,025	0.04	
Independent	Morris Lychenheim	414	0.02	
Write-in	Write-ins	6	0.00	
Majority				
Turnout				
Republican hold		Swing		

== 1920 ==
1920 Illinois gubernatorial election
Party	Candidate	Votes	%	±%
Republican	Len Small	1,243,148	58.87	
Democratic	J. Hamilton Lewis	731,551	34.64	
Socialist	Andrew Lafin	58,998	2.79	
Farmer–Labor	John H. Walker	56,480	2.67	
Prohibition	James H. Woertendyke	9,876	0.47	
Independent	John Maynard Harlan	5,990	0.28	
Socialist Labor	John M. Francis	3,020	0.14	
Independent	Harrison Parker	1,254	0.06	
Independent	Lewis D. Spaulding	930	0.04	
Independent	Parke Longworth	357	0.02	
Write-In	Write-ins	5	0.00	
Majority				
Turnout				
Republican hold		Swing		

== 1916 ==
1916 Illinois gubernatorial election
Party	Candidate	Votes	%	±%
Republican	Frank O. Lowden	696,535	52.67	
Democratic	Edward F. Dunne (incumbent)	556,654	42.09	
Socialist	Seymour Stedman	52,316	3.96	
Prohibition	John R. Golden	15,309	1.16	
Socialist Labor	John M. Francis	1,739	0.13	
Majority				
Turnout				
Republican gain from Democratic		Swing		

== 1912 ==
1912 Illinois gubernatorial election
Party	Candidate	Votes	%	±%
Democratic	Edward F. Dunne	443,120	38.11	
Republican	Charles S. Deneen (incumbent)	318,469	27.39	
Progressive	Frank H. Funk	303,401	26.09	
Socialist	John C. Kennedy	78,679	6.77	
Prohibition	Edward Worrell	15,131	1.30	
Socialist Labor	John M. Francis	3,980	0.34	
Plurality				
Turnout				
Democratic gain from Republican		Swing		

== 1908 ==
1908 Illinois gubernatorial election
Party	Candidate	Votes	%	±%
Republican	Charles S. Deneen (incumbent)	550,076	47.64	
Democratic	Adlai Stevenson I	526,912	45.64	
Prohibition	Daniel R. Sheen	33,922	2.94	
Socialist	James H. Brower	31,293	2.71	
Independent	George W. McCaskrin	10,883	0.94	
Socialist Labor	Gustav A. Jennings	1,526	0.13	
Plurality				
Turnout				
Republican hold		Swing		

== 1904 ==
1904 Illinois gubernatorial election
Party	Candidate	Votes	%	±%
Republican	Charles S. Deneen	634,029	59.09	
Democratic	Lawrence B. Stringer	334,880	31.21	
Socialist	John Collins	59,062	5.50	
Prohibition	Robert H. Patton	35,440	3.30	
Socialist Labor	Philip Veal	4,379	0.41	
Populist	James Hogan	4,364	0.41	
Independent	Andrew G. Specht	780	0.07	
Majority				
Turnout				
Republican hold		Swing		

== 1876 ==
1876 Illinois gubernatorial election
Party	Candidate	Votes	%	±%
Republican	Shelby Moore Cullom	279,263	50.58%	0.00%
Democratic	Lewis Steward	272,465	49.35%	
Independent	Samuel B. Allen	184	0.03%	
Prohibition	James F. Simpson	181	0.03%	
Total votes		552,093	100.00%	
Republican hold				

== 1872 ==
1872 Illinois gubernatorial election
Party	Candidate	Votes	%	±%
Republican	Richard J. Oglesby	237,774	54.41%	−1.16%
Liberal Republican	Gustavus Koerner	197,084	45.10%	
Independent	B. G. Wright	2,185	0.50%	
Majority		40,690	9.31%	−1.83%
Total votes		437,043	100.00%	
Republican hold				

== 1868 ==
1868 Illinois gubernatorial election
Party	Candidate	Votes	%	±%
Republican	John M. Palmer	249,912	55.57%	+1.03%
Democratic	John R. Eden	199,813	44.43%	−1.03%
Majority		50,099	11.14%	+2.06%
Total votes		449,725	100.00%	
Republican hold				

== 1864 ==
1864 Illinois gubernatorial election
Party	Candidate	Votes	%	±%
Republican	Richard J. Oglesby	190,376	54.54%	+3.39%
Democratic	James Carroll Robinson	158,711	45.46%	−1.88%
Majority		31,665	9.08%	+5.23%
Total votes		349,087	100.00%	
Republican hold				

== 1860 ==
1860 Illinois gubernatorial election
Party	Candidate	Votes	%	±%
Republican	Richard Yates	172,196	51.15%	+4.22%
Democratic	James C. Allen	159,253	47.34%	+2.35%
Independent	Thomas Hope	2,049	0.61%	N/A
Constitutional Union	John T. Stuart	1,626	0.48%	N/A
Independent	J. W. Chickering	1,148	0.34%	N/A
Independent	William Brown	68	0.02%	N/A
Independent	John Hossack	46	0.01%	N/A
Independent	Scattering	17	0.01%	N/A
Majority		12,943	3.85%	−6.77%
Turnout		336,403	100.00%	
Republican hold		Swing		

== 1856 ==
1856 Illinois gubernatorial election
Party	Candidate	Votes	%	±%
Republican	William Henry Bissell	111,466	46.97%	+5.21%
Democratic	William A. Richardson	106,769	44.99%	−7.40%
Know Nothing	Buckner S. Morris	19,088	8.04%	N/A
Majority		16,381	10.62%	−68.90%
Turnout		237,323	100.00%	
Republican gain from Democratic		Swing		

== 1852 ==
1852 Illinois gubernatorial election
Party	Candidate	Votes	%	±%
Democratic	Joel Aldrich Matteson	80,789	52.39%	−34.37%
Whig	E. B. Webb	64,408	41.76%	+34.52%
Free Soil	D. A. Knowlton	9,024	5.85%	−0.15%
Majority		16,381	10.62%	−68.90%
Turnout		154,221	100.00%	
Democratic hold		Swing		

== 1848 ==
1848 Illinois gubernatorial election
Party	Candidate	Votes	%	±%
Democratic	Augustus C. French (incumbent)	67,828	86.76%	+28.56%
Whig	W. L. D. Morrison	5,659	7.24%	−29.45%
Free Soil	Charles V. Dyer	4,692	6.00%	+6.00%
Majority		62,169	79.52%	N/A
Turnout		78,179	100.00%	
Democratic hold		Swing		

== 1846 ==
1846 Illinois gubernatorial election
Party	Candidate	Votes	%	±%
Democratic	Augustus C. French	58,657	58.20%	+4.68%
Whig	Thomas M. Kilpatrick	37,033	36.69%	−8.74%
Independent	Richard Eels	5,154	5.11%	+4.07%
Majority		21,624	21.51%	N/A
Turnout		100,844	100.00%	
Democratic hold		Swing		

== 1842 ==
1842 Illinois gubernatorial election
Party	Candidate	Votes	%	±%
Democratic	Thomas Ford	46,452	53.52%	+2.74%
Whig	Joseph Duncan	39,429	45.43%	−3.79%
Independent	Charles M. Hunter	906	1.04%	+1.04%
Independent	Scattering	3	0.00%	0.00%
Majority		7,023	8.09%	N/A
Turnout		86,793		
Democratic hold		Swing		

== 1838 ==
1838 Illinois gubernatorial election
Party	Candidate	Votes	%	±%
Democratic	Thomas Carlin	30,668	50.78%	+19.57%
Whig	Cyrus Edward	29,722	49.22%	−3.71%
Majority		946	1.56%	N/A
Turnout		60,390		
Democratic gain from Whig		Swing		

== 1834 ==
1834 Illinois gubernatorial election
Party	Candidate	Votes	%	±%
Whig	Joseph Duncan	17,349	52.93%	+52.93%
Democratic	William Kinney	10,229	31.21%	−27.74%
Independent	Robert K. McLaughlin	4,315	13.16%	
Independent	James Adams	887	2.71%	
Majority		7,120	21.72%	
Turnout		32,780	100.00%	
Whig gain from Democratic				

== 1830 ==
1830 Illinois gubernatorial election
Party	Candidate	Votes	%	±%
Democratic	John Reynolds	12,837	58.95	+54.38
Democratic-Republican	William Kinney	8,938	41.05	−8.42
Majority		3,899	17.90	N/A
Turnout		21,775		
Democratic gain from Democratic-Republican		Swing		

== 1826 ==
1826 Illinois gubernatorial election
Party	Candidate	Votes	%	±%
Democratic-Republican	Ninian Edwards	6,280	49.47	N/A
Independent	Thomas Sloo Jr.	5,834	45.96	N/A
Democratic-Republican	Adolphus Hubbard	580	4.57	N/A
Majority		446	3.51	N/A
Turnout		12,694		
Democratic-Republican gain from Independent		Swing		

== 1822 ==
1822 Illinois gubernatorial election
Party	Candidate	Votes	%	±%
Independent	Edward Coles	2,845	33.16	N/A
Democratic-Republican	Joseph Phillips	2,687	31.22	N/A
Democratic-Republican	Thomas C. Brown	2,443	28.39	N/A
Democratic-Republican	James B. Moore	622	7.23	N/A
Majority		167	1.94	N/A
Turnout		8,606		
Democratic-Republican hold		Swing		

== 1818 ==
1818 Illinois gubernatorial election
Party	Candidate	Votes	%	±%
Independent	Shadrach Bond	3,828	98.99	N/A
Independent	Henry Reavis	19	1.01	N/A
