= 1822 Illinois gubernatorial election =

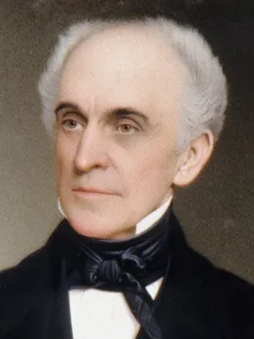

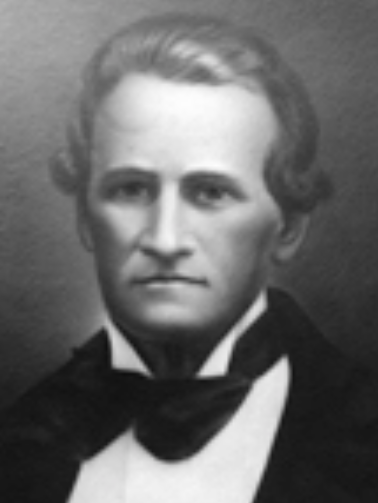

Nominee	Edward Coles	Joseph Phillips
Party	Independent	Democratic-Republican
Popular vote	2,854	2,687
Percentage	33.16%	31.22%
Nominee	Thomas C. Browne	James B. Moore
Party	Democratic-Republican	Democratic-Republican
Popular vote	2,443	622
Percentage	28.39%	7.23%
- County Results Coles: 50–60% 60–70% 80–90% Phillips: 40–50% 60–70% 70–80% Browne: 40–50% 50–60% 60–70% 70–80% 80–90% Moore: 60–70% Tie: 40–50% Phillips/Browne
Governor before election
Shadrach Bond
Independent
Elected Governor
Edward Coles
Democratic-Republican

The 1822 Illinois gubernatorial election was Illinois's second gubernatorial election and its first competitive election. All candidates in the election represented the Democratic-Republican Party except Edward Coles, who ran as an independent.

The election resulted in the narrow victory of anti-slavery Edward Coles over the pro-slavery Joseph Philips.

== General election ==
=== Candidates ===
- Thomas C. Browne, justice of the Supreme Court of Illinois and former state legislator from Gallatin County (Democratic-Republican)
- Edward Coles, former private secretary to President James Madison and abolitionist (Independent)
- Joseph Philips, chief justice of the Supreme Court of Illinois (Democratic-Republican)
- James B. Moore (Democratic-Republican)

=== Results ===
1822 gubernatorial election, Illinois
Party	Candidate	Votes	%	±%
Independent	Edward Coles	2,854	33.16	N/A
Democratic-Republican	Joseph Phillips	2,687	31.22	N/A
Democratic-Republican	Thomas C. Browne	2,443	28.39	N/A
Democratic-Republican	James B. Moore	622	7.23	N/A
Majority		167	1.94	N/A
Turnout		8,606		
Independent hold		Swing		

== See also ==
- 1822 Illinois lieutenant gubernatorial election
