= 1822 Illinois lieutenant gubernatorial election =

- August 5, 1822

Nominee	Adolphus Hubbard	James Lemen Jr.	John G. Lofton
Party	Democratic-Republican	Democratic-Republican	Democratic-Republican
Popular vote	3,114	2,970	1,494
Percentage	40.42%	38.55%	19.39%
Lieutenant Governor before election
Pierre Menard
Democratic-Republican
Elected Lieutenant Governor
Adolphus Hubbard
Democratic-Republican

The 1822 Illinois lieutenant gubernatorial election was held on August 5, 1822, in order to elect the lieutenant governor of Illinois. Democratic-Republican candidate Adolphus Hubbard defeated fellow Democratic-Republican candidates James Lemen Jr. and John G. Lofton.

== General election ==
On election day, August 5, 1822, Democratic-Republican candidate Adolphus Hubbard won the election by a margin of 144 votes against his foremost opponent and fellow Democratic-Republican candidate James Lemen Jr., thereby retaining Democratic-Republican control over the office of lieutenant governor. Hubbard was sworn in as the 2nd lieutenant governor of Illinois on December 5, 1822.

=== Results ===
Illinois lieutenant gubernatorial election, 1822
Party	Candidate	Votes	%
Democratic-Republican	Adolphus Hubbard	3,114	40.42
Democratic-Republican	James Lemen Jr.	2,970	38.55
Democratic-Republican	John G. Lofton	1,494	19.39
Write-in		127	1.64
Total votes		7,705	100.00
Democratic-Republican hold			

== See also ==
- 1822 Illinois gubernatorial election
