= 1826 Illinois gubernatorial election =

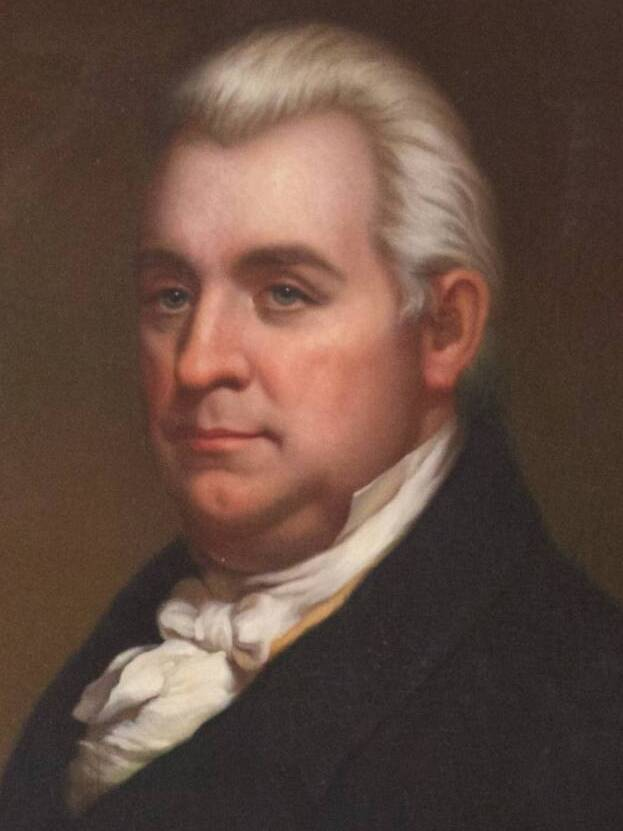

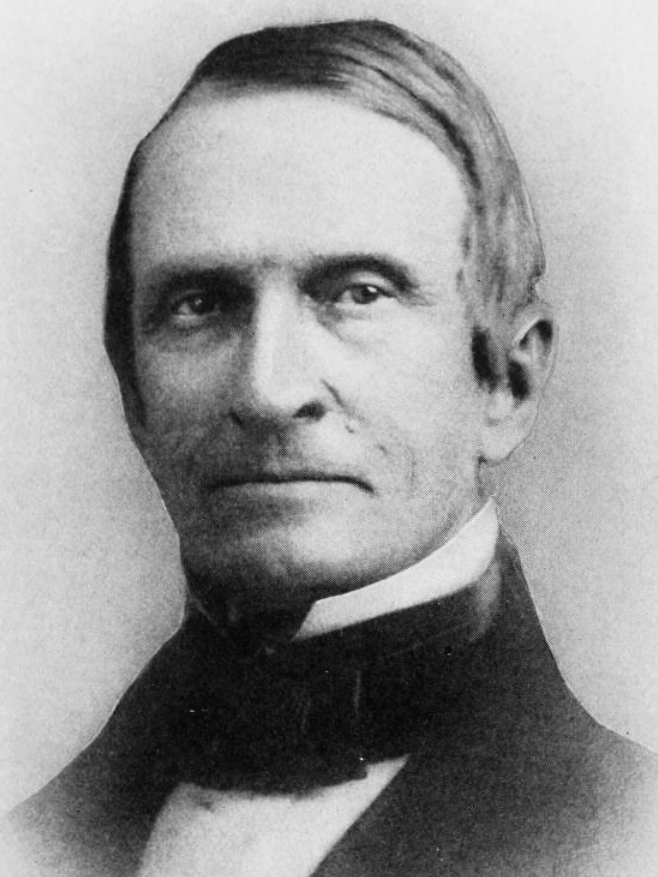
Nominee	Ninian Edwards	Thomas Sloo Jr.
Party	Anti-Jacksonian	Jacksonian
Popular vote	6,280	5,834
Percentage	49.47%	45.96%
- County Results Edwards: 40–50% 50–60% 60–70% 70–80% 80–90% 90–100% Tie: 40–50% Edwards/Sloo; Sloo: 40–50% 50–60% 60–70% 70–80% 80–90% 90–100% Unknown/No Vote
Governor before election
Edward Coles
Independent
Elected Governor
Ninian Edwards
Democratic-Republican

The 1826 Illinois gubernatorial election was the third quadrennial election for this office. Former territorial governor Ninian Edwards was elected with 49 percent of the vote. State senator Thomas Sloo Jr. came in second and lieutenant governor Adolphus Hubbard came in third.

== General election ==
=== Candidates ===
- Ninian Edwards, former U.S. senator and territorial governor (Anti-Jacksonian)
- Adolphus Hubbard, lieutenant governor of Illinois (Independent)
- Thomas Sloo Jr., state senator from McLeansboro (Jacksonian)

=== Results ===
1826 gubernatorial election, Illinois
Party	Candidate	Votes	%	±%
Anti-Jacksonian	Ninian Edwards	6,280	49.47	N/A
Jacksonian	Thomas Sloo Jr.	5,834	45.96	N/A
Independent	Adolphus Hubbard	580	4.57	N/A
Majority		446	3.51	N/A
Turnout		12,694		
Anti-Jacksonian gain from Independent		Swing		

== See also ==
- 1826 Illinois lieutenant gubernatorial election
