= 1826 Illinois lieutenant gubernatorial election =

- August 7, 1826

Nominee	William Kinney	Samuel S. Thompson
Party	Democratic-Republican	Democratic-Republican
Popular vote	6,019	5,515
Percentage	50.76%	46.51%
Lieutenant Governor before election
Adolphus Hubbard
Democratic-Republican
Elected Lieutenant Governor
William Kinney
Democratic-Republican

The 1826 Illinois lieutenant gubernatorial election was held on August 7, 1826, in order to elect the lieutenant governor of Illinois. Democratic-Republican candidate and incumbent member of the Illinois Senate William Kinney defeated fellow Democratic-Republican candidates Samuel S. Thompson and James Adams.

== General election ==
On election day, August 7, 1826, Democratic-Republican candidate William Kinney won the election by a margin of 504 votes against his foremost opponent and fellow Democratic-Republican candidate Samuel S. Thompson, thereby retaining Democratic-Republican control over the office of lieutenant governor. Kinney was sworn in as the 3rd lieutenant governor of Illinois on December 6, 1826.

=== Results ===
Illinois lieutenant gubernatorial election, 1826
Party	Candidate	Votes	%
Democratic-Republican	William Kinney	6,019	50.76
Democratic-Republican	Samuel S. Thompson	5,515	46.51
Democratic-Republican	James Adams	257	2.17
Write-in		67	0.56
Total votes		11,858	100.00
Democratic-Republican hold			

== See also ==
- 1826 Illinois gubernatorial election
