= Governor Coles State Memorial =

Coordinates: 38°47.895′N 89°58.657′W

- Location: Valley View Cemetery; Edwardsville, Illinois
- Material: Concrete, bronze
- Beginning date: 1928-1929
- Dedicated to: Edward Coles

The Governor Coles State Memorial, also known as the Edward E. Coles Monument and the Governor Coles Monument, is a concrete memorial dedicated to Edward Coles, the second governor of Illinois (1822 to 1826). Erected between 1928-1929, the memorial features a bronze portrait of Coles sculpted by Leon Hermant, and is maintained by the Illinois Historic Preservation Agency as a state historic site. The memorial is located in Valley View Cemetery in Edwardsville, Illinois.
