= 1826 Boston mayoral election =

Election in Massachusetts, United States

- December 11, 1826
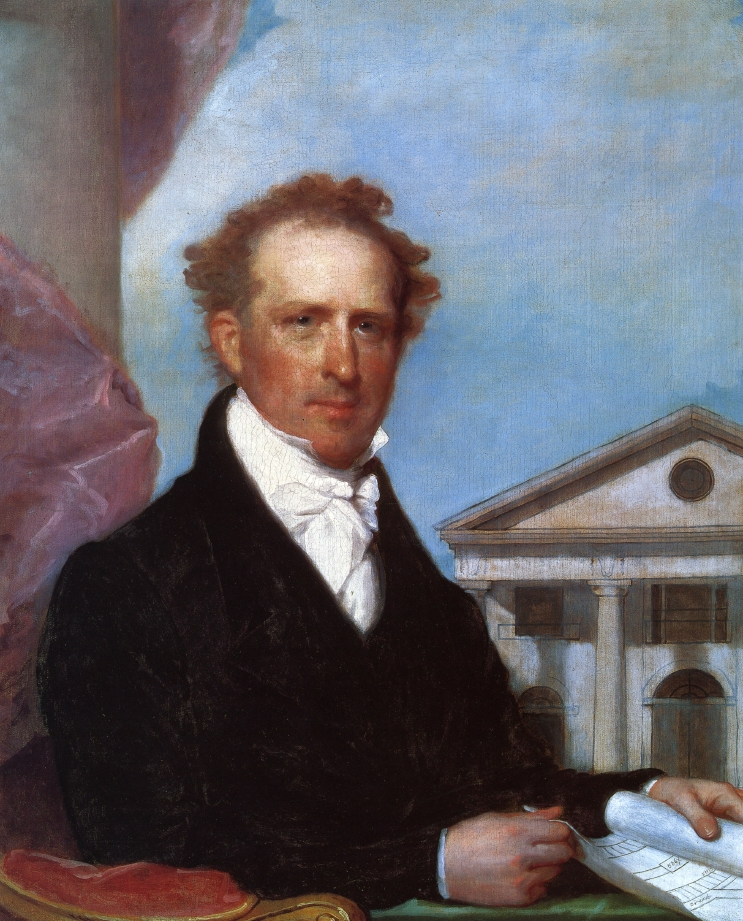

Candidate	Josiah Quincy III	George Blake
Popular vote	3,163	1,750
Percentage	62.76%	34.72%
Mayor before election
Josiah Quincy III
Federalist
Elected mayor
Josiah Quincy III
Federalist

The 1826 Boston mayoral election saw the reelection of incumbent Josiah Quincy III to a fifth consecutive term. It was held on December 11, 1826. His opponent was George Blake, the U.S. district attorney for District of Massachusetts.

== Results ==
1827 Boston mayoral election
Candidate	Votes	%
Josiah Quincy III (incumbent)	3,163	62.76
George Blake	1,750	34.72
Scattering	127	2.52
Total votes	5,040	100

== See also ==
- List of mayors of Boston, Massachusetts
