= 1826 Maine gubernatorial election =

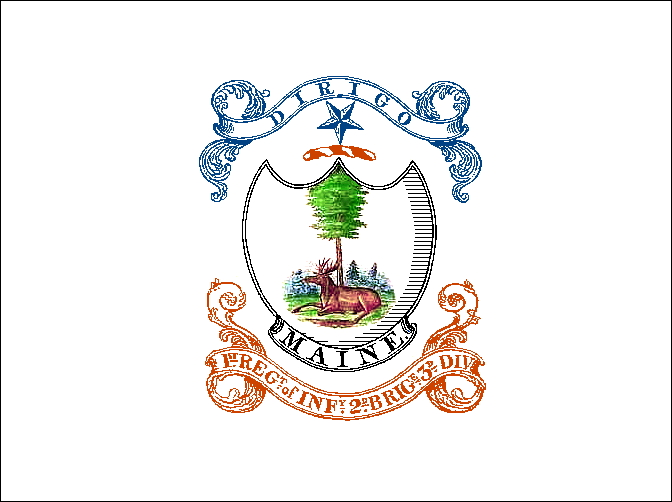
- September 11, 1826
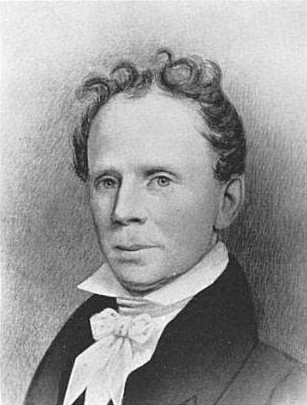
Nominee	Enoch Lincoln
Party	Democratic-Republican
Popular vote	20,689
Percentage	98.22%
- County results Lincoln: 90–100%
Governor before election
Albion Parris
Democratic-Republican
Elected Governor
Enoch Lincoln
Democratic-Republican

The 1826 Maine gubernatorial election took place on September 11, 1826. Incumbent Democratic-Republican Governor Albion Parris did not run for re-election. Democratic-Republican candidate Enoch Lincoln won election virtually unopposed.

== Results ==
1826 Maine gubernatorial election
Party	Candidate	Votes	%
Democratic-Republican	Enoch Lincoln	20,689	98.22%
Write-in		374	1.78%
Majority		20,315	96.45%
Total votes		21,063	100.00%
Democratic-Republican hold			
