= Thomas Sloo Jr. =

American politician

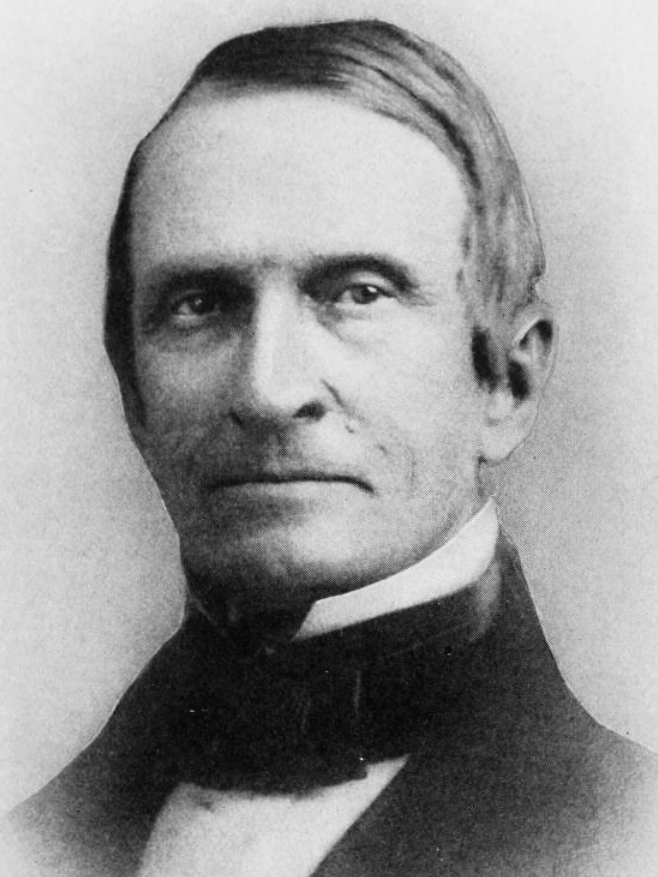

Member of the Illinois Senate from the Jefferson and Hamilton County district
- In office 1824 – 1828

Personal details
- Born: April 5, 1790 Washington, Kentucky
- Died: January 17, 1879 (aged 88)
- Spouse(s): Harriet Irwin; Rebecca Smith Findlay; Maria Francis Campbell
- Children: 7

Thomas Sloo Jr. (April 5, 1790 – January 17, 1879) was an American politician and merchant from Kentucky. Orphaned, Sloo moved to Cincinnati, Ohio, to support his siblings and made a fortune operating a store. However, he lost it all in the Panic of 1819 and settled in Illinois. He quickly regained prosperity after organizing McLeansboro, Illinois and was soon elected to the Illinois Senate. Sloo was an unsuccessful candidate for Governor of Illinois in 1826. Crestfallen, Sloo moved to New Orleans, Louisiana to trade commissions. After a brief stay in Havana, Cuba, where he founded a gas company, Sloo returned to New Orleans and served as city treasurer and president of the Sun Mutual Insurance Company.

== Biography ==
Sloo was born on April 5, 1790, in Washington, Kentucky. He attended public schools, but was orphaned before he could complete his studies. To support his siblings, Sloo moved to Cincinnati, Ohio, to work in merchandising. He was initially very successful, but lost all of his fortune in the Panic of 1819 and he was forced to close his store. Penniless, he removed to Shawneetown, Illinois.

Sloo remained in Shawneetown only briefly before moving farther west to western White County, Illinois. When Hamilton County was organized on February 15, 1821, Sloo was appointed a surveyor. He platted McLeansboro, the new county seat, and established a store there. He quickly became one of the most prosperous and well-known men in the area. Sloo was elected to the Illinois Senate in 1822, where he advocated for slavery in Illinois. Sloo was named one of the first five canal commissioners tasked with overseeing the Illinois and Michigan Canal project. He received four votes for U.S. Senator in the 1824 joint legislative ballot.

In 1826, Sloo unsuccessfully ran for Governor of Illinois as a Jacksonian against Ninian Edwards, receiving 5,834 votes compared to Edwards' 6,280. Sloo was disappointed by the defeat and decided to leave the state, selling his property and moving to New Orleans, Louisiana. For the next twenty years, Sloo worked in the commission business. He moved to Havana, Cuba in 1848 and built a gas station to provide street lights for the city. After a few years, he returned to New Orleans, where he remained for the rest of his life. He was named the first president of the Sun Mutual Insurance Company and served as city treasurer. He was also a member of the city board of education from its founding until 1860.

Sloo married Harriet Irwin on July 14, 1814. However, she died only a year after the marriage and their only child died soon afterward. He married Rebecca Smith Findlay on August 25, 1819. None of their children survived to adulthood. On May 24, 1849, he married Maria Francis Campbell, the daughter of Congressman Robert B. Campbell. They had six children, three surviving to adulthood: Maria Frances, Laura Campbell, and Thomas III. Sloo died on January 17, 1879.
