= 1826 Connecticut lieutenant gubernatorial election =

- April 13, 1826
Nominee	David Plant
Party	National Republican
Popular vote	4,794
Percentage	77.70%
- Plant: 20–30% 40–50% 50–60% 60–70% 70–80% 80–90% 90–100% Pitkin: 50–60% 60–70% Sherman: 40–50% Tie: 40–50% No Data/Vote
Lieutenant Governor before election
David Plant
National Republican
Elected Lieutenant Governor
David Plant
National Republican

The 1826 Connecticut lieutenant gubernatorial election was held on April 13, 1826, in order to elect the lieutenant governor of Connecticut. Incumbent National Republican lieutenant governor David Plant won re-election as he ran with minimal opposition.

== General election ==
On election day, April 13, 1826, incumbent National Republican lieutenant governor David Plant won re-election with 77.70% of the vote, thereby retaining National Republican control over the office of lieutenant governor. Plant was sworn in for his fourth term on May 2, 1826.

=== Results ===
Connecticut lieutenant gubernatorial election, 1826
Party	Candidate	Votes	%
National Republican	David Plant (incumbent)	4,794	77.70
	Scattering	1,378	22.30
Total votes		6,172	100.00
National Republican hold			
