= 1944 Illinois gubernatorial election =

- November 7, 1944
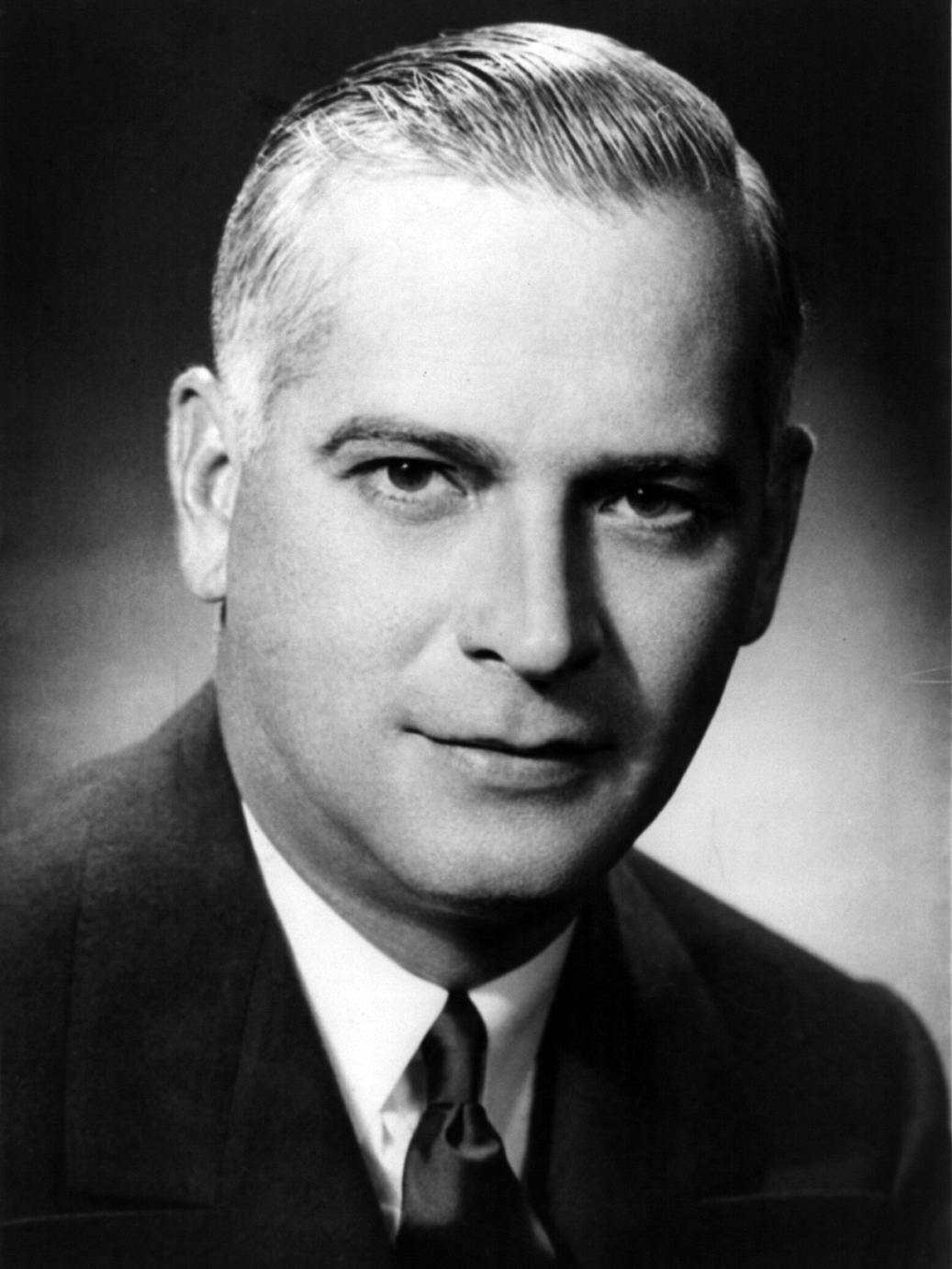

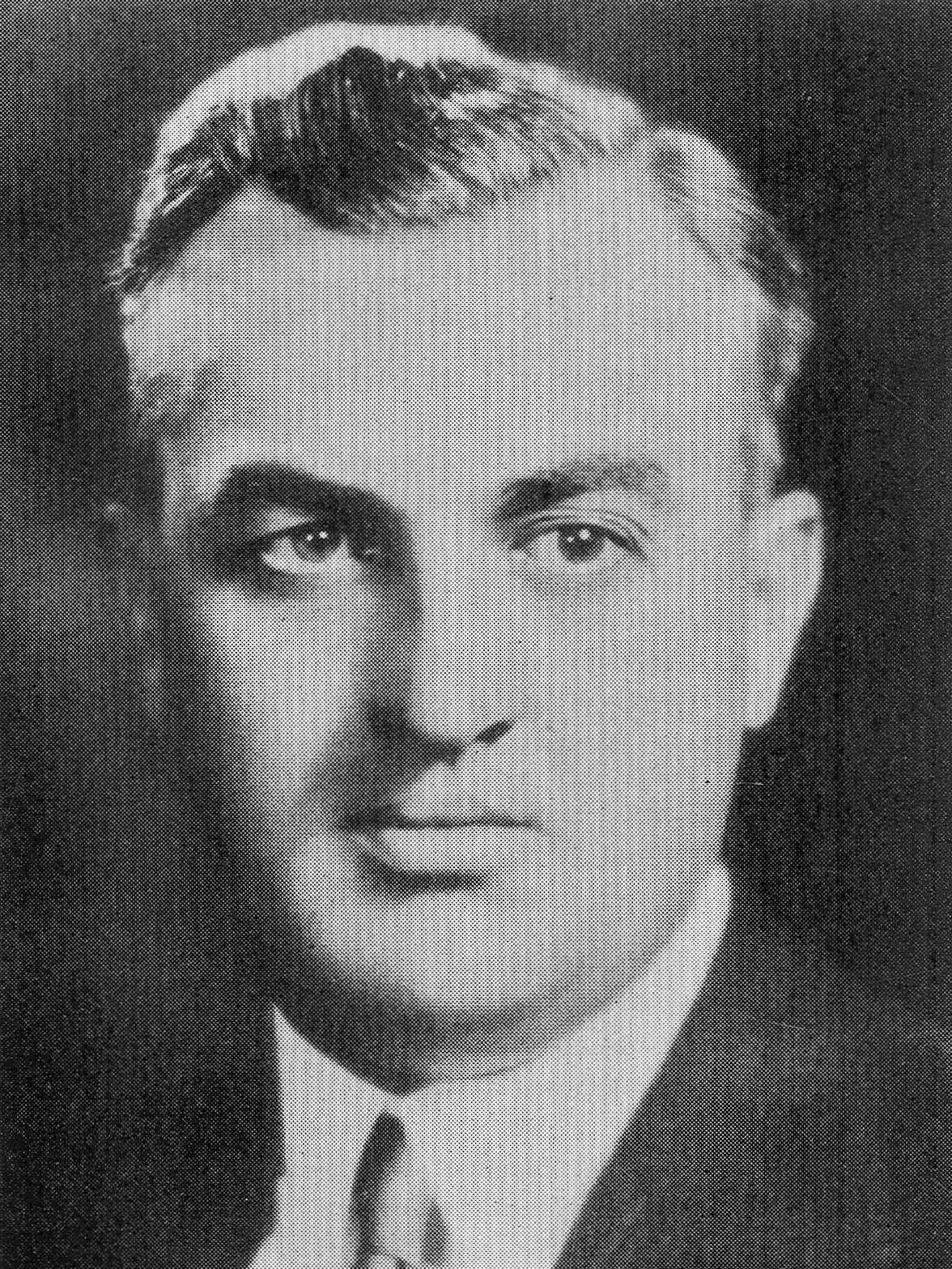
Nominee	Dwight H. Green	Thomas J. Courtney
Party	Republican	Democratic
Popular vote	2,013,270	1,940,999
Percentage	50.75%	48.93%
- County results Green: 50–60% 60–70% 70–80% Courtney: 50–60% 60–70%
Governor before election
Dwight H. Green
Republican
Elected Governor
Dwight H. Green
Republican

The 1944 Illinois gubernatorial election was held on November 7, 1944. Incumbent Governor Dwight H. Green, a Republican, was narrowly reelected to a second term, defeating Democratic nominee, Illinois State Senator and attorney, Thomas J. Courtney with 50.75% of the vote.

== Democratic primary ==
Gubernatorial Democratic primary
Party	Candidate	Votes	%
Democratic	Thomas J. Courtney	531,134	100
Write-in		1	0.00
Total votes		531,135	100

== Republican primary ==
Gubernatorial Republican primary
Party	Candidate	Votes	%
Republican	Dwight H. Green (incumbent)	621,286	86.16
Republican	Oscar E. Carlstrom	99,831	13.84
Total votes		721,117	100

== General election ==
Gubernatorial election
Party	Candidate	Votes	%
Republican	Dwight H. Green (incumbent)	2,013,270	50.75
Democratic	Thomas J. Courtney	1,940,999	48.93
Socialist Labor	Charles Storm	6,906	0.17
Prohibition	Willis Ray Wilson	5,590	0.14
Total votes		3,966,765	100
