= 1826 Argentine presidential election =

- 7 February 1826 / 27 February 1826

38 members of the Electoral College 20 votes needed to win
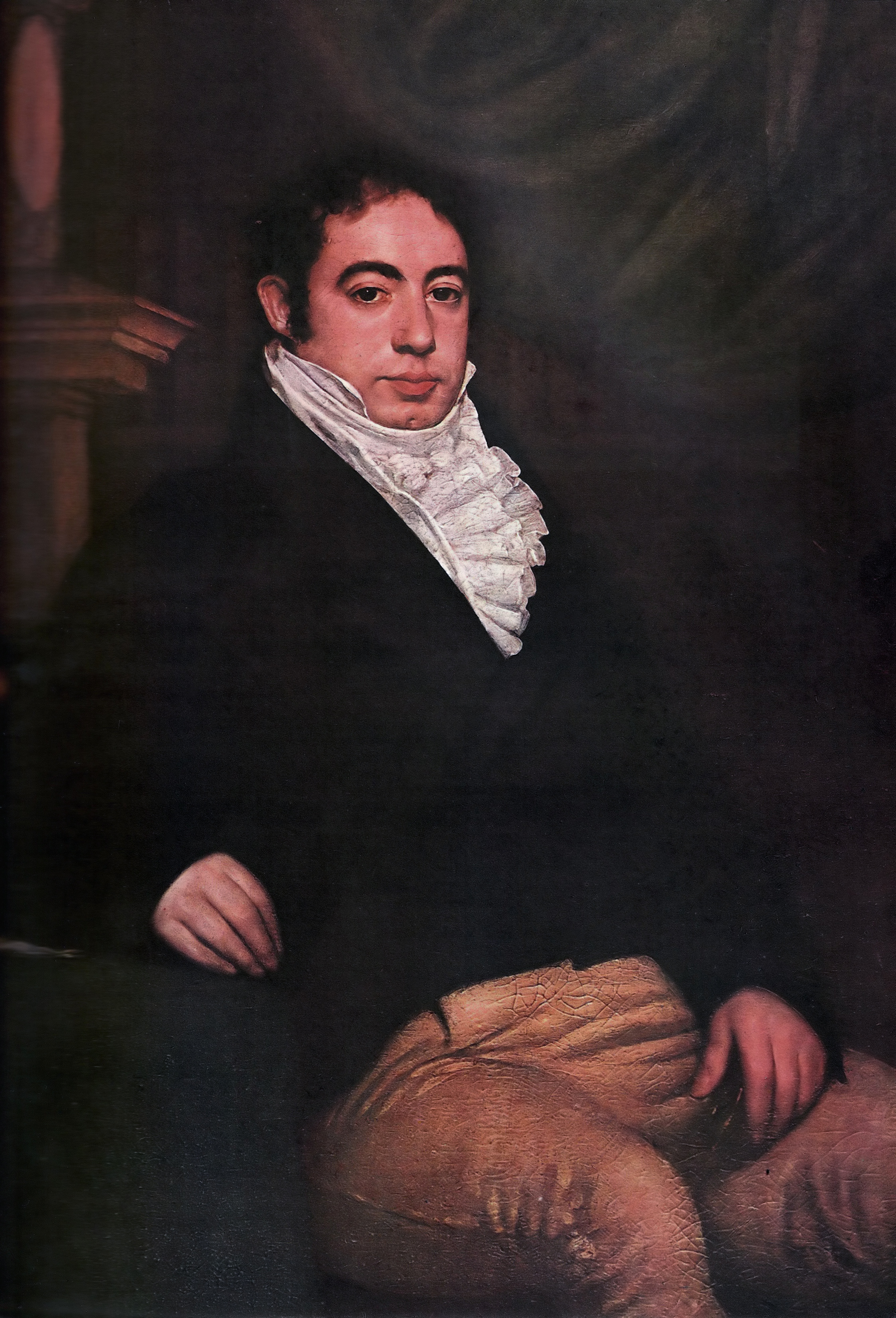

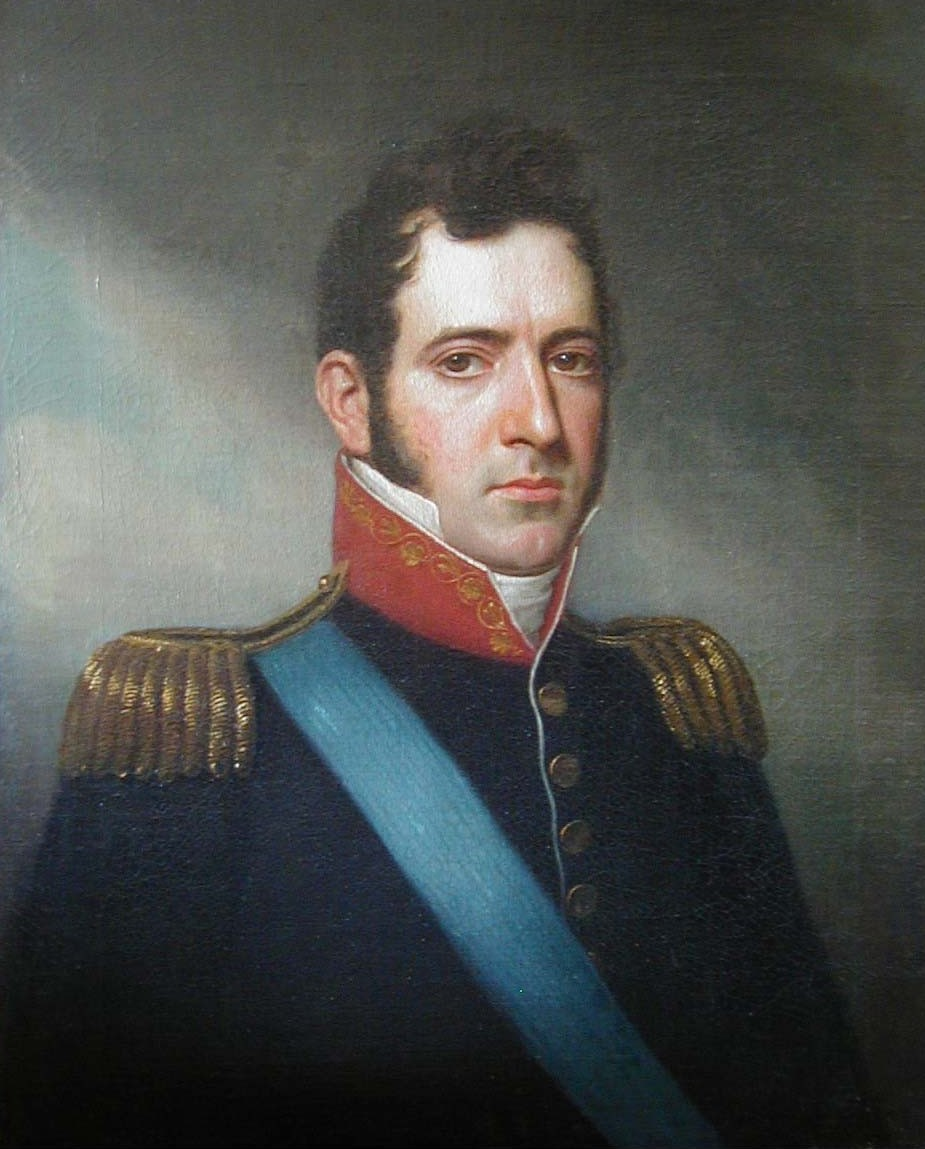

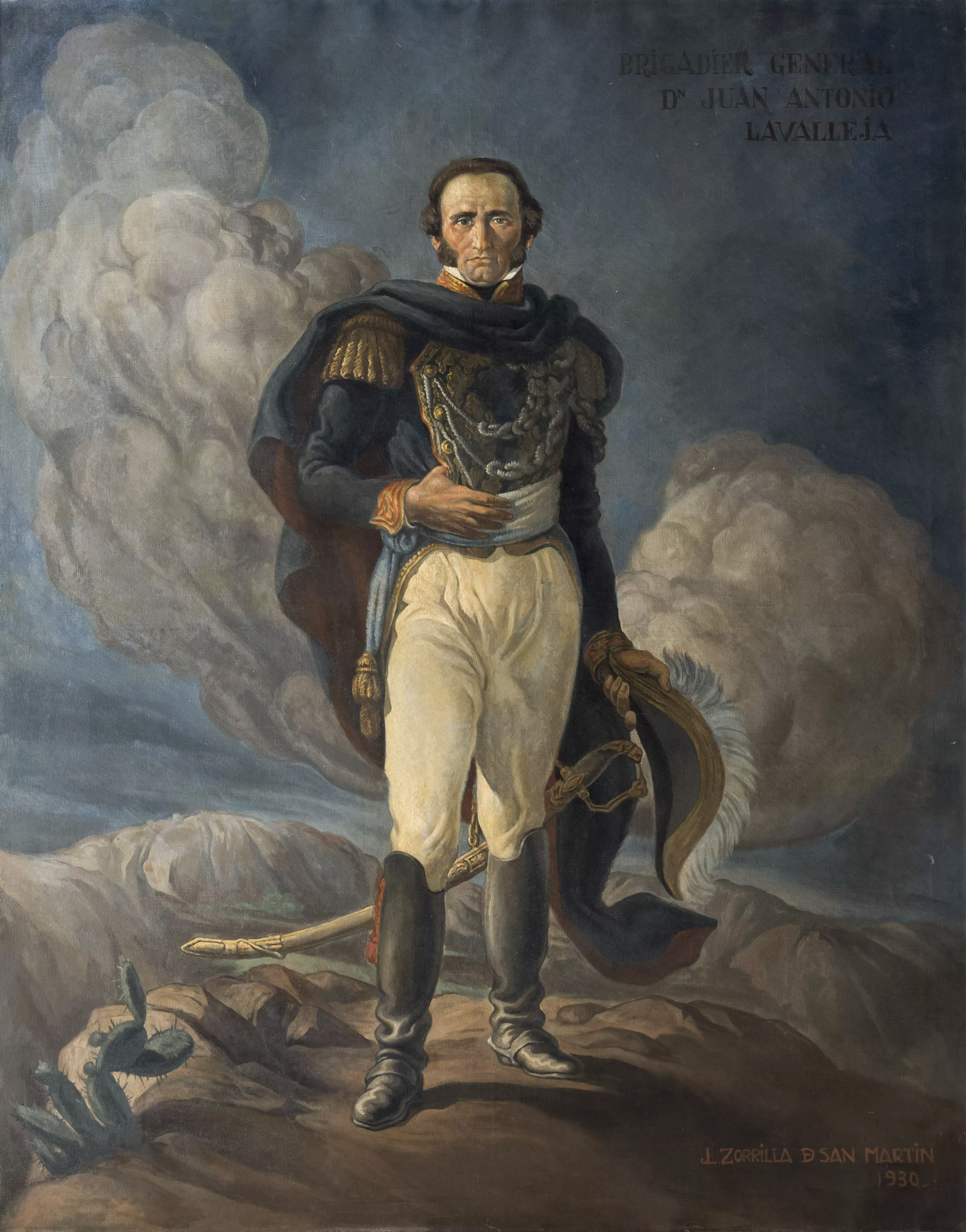

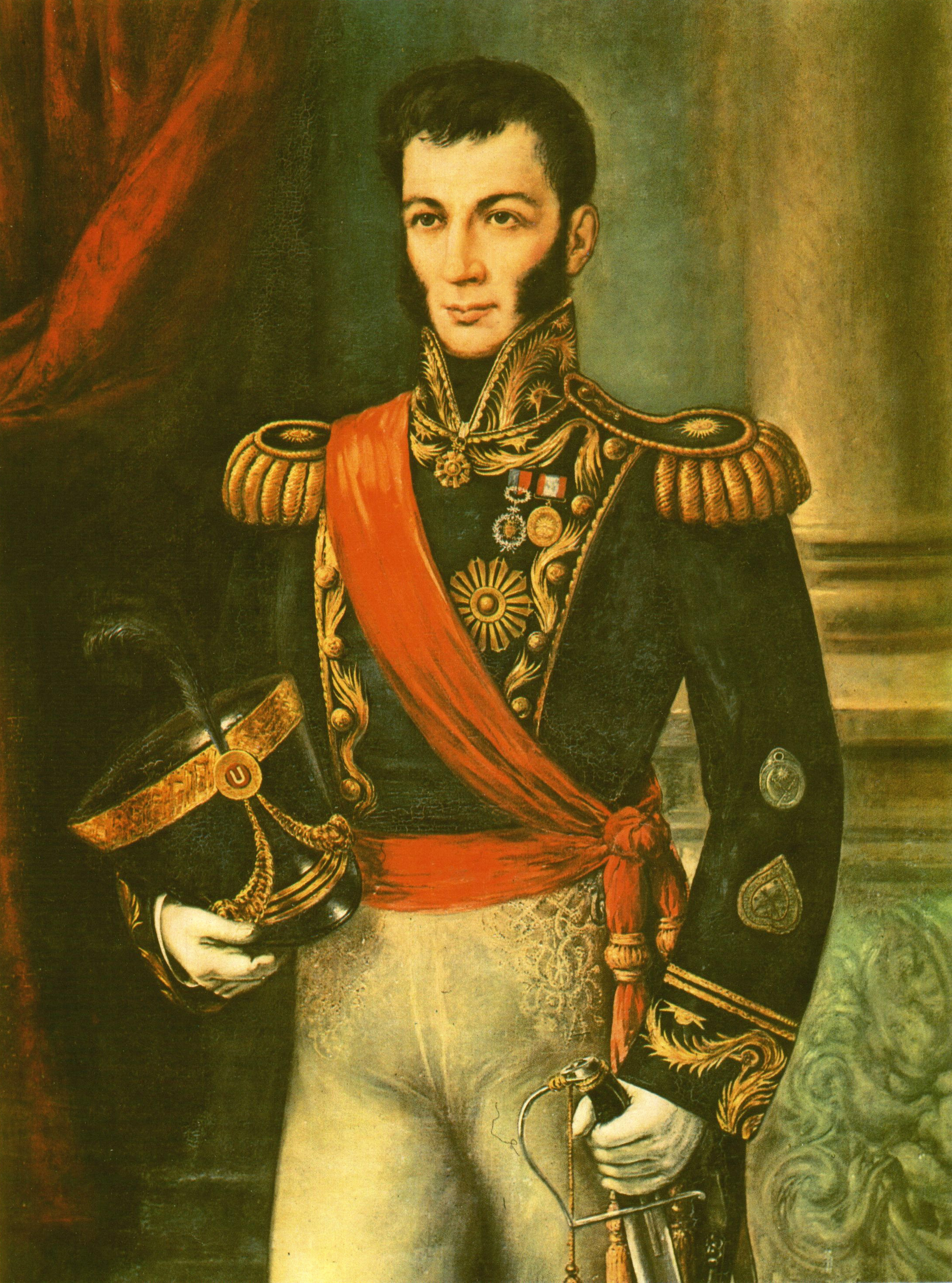
Nominee	Bernardino Rivadavia	Carlos María de Alvear
Party	Unitarian	Unitarian
Electoral vote	35	1
Percentage	92.11%	2.63%
Nominee	Juan Antonio Lavalleja	Juan Antonio Álvarez de Arenales
Party	Federalist	Unitarian
Electoral vote	1	1
Percentage	2.63%	2.63%
President before election
Juan Gregorio de las Heras
(Governor of Buenos Aires)
Independent
Elected President
Bernardino Rivadavia
Unitarian

Presidential elections were held for the first time in the United Provinces of the Río de la Plata on 7 February 1826 while other sources claim 27 February 1826, during the Cisplatine War. The elections were indirectly, with members of Congress forming an electoral college. Bernardino Rivadavia was the only candidate, and was elected with 35 votes in favor and three against. He was and sworn in the following day. His appointment, because a national constitution had not yet been sanctioned or approved, was questioned and viewed with suspicion by several provinces.

== Results ==
Candidate	Votes	%
Bernardino Rivadavia	35	92.11
Against	3	7.89
Total	38	100.00
Source: Jornada

== See also ==
- History of Argentina
- United Provinces of South America
