= 1826 Virginia gubernatorial election =

- December 9, 1826
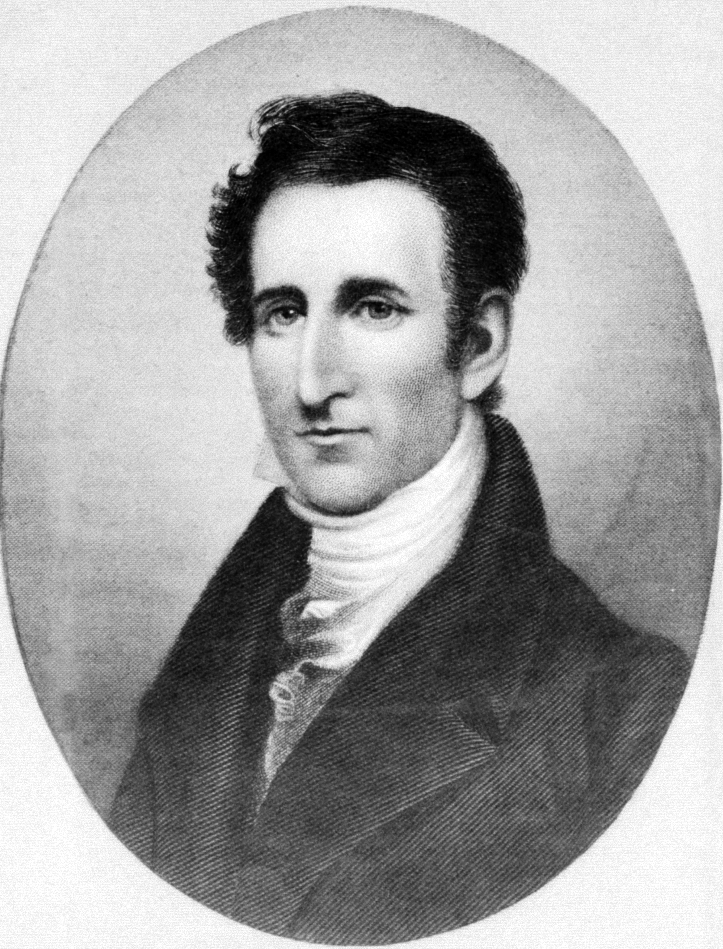
Nominee	John Tyler
Governor before election
John Tyler
Democratic-Republican
Elected Governor
John Tyler
Democratic-Republican (Note: The Journal of the House of Delegates does not list parties for this election. Chitwood states that Tyler as governor "did not have behind him in the legislature a dominant and well-disciplined party;" Sobel and Raimo say that Tyler served in the U.S. House of Representatives as a Democratic-Republican; while Kallenbach and Kallenbach list Tyler as a Jeffersonian Republican during his tenure.)

A gubernatorial election was held in Virginia on December 9, 1826. The incumbent governor of Virginia John Tyler was re-elected unanimously.

The election was conducted by the Virginia General Assembly in joint session. Tyler's first term was generally considered successful, and he faced no opposition to his bid for re-election. He was elected unanimously on the first ballot.

== General election ==
1826 Virginia gubernatorial election
Candidate	First ballot	
Candidate	Count	Percent
John Tyler (incumbent)	**	100.00
Total	**	100.00

== Bibliography ==
- Chitwood, Oliver Perry (1964). John Tyler: Champion of the Old South. New York: Russell and Russell.
- Kallenbach, Joseph E.; Kallenbach, Jessamine S. (1977). American State Governors, 1776–1976. Vol. 1. Dobbs Ferry, NY: Oceana Publications.
- Sobel, Robert; Raimo, John (1978). Biographical Directory of the Governors of the United States 1789–1978. Vol. 4. Westport, CT: Meckler Books.
- Virginia (1826). Journal of the House of Delegates [...]. Richmond.
