= 1826 Ohio gubernatorial election =

- October 10, 1826
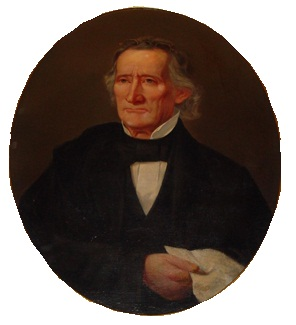

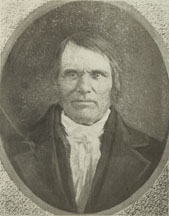
| Nominee | Allen Trimble | Alexander Campbell |
| Party | National Republican | Democratic-Republican |
| Popular vote | 71,475 | 4,765 |
| Percentage | 84.35% | 5.62% |
- Election results by county Trimble: 40–50% 50–60% 60–70% 70–80% 80–90% 90–100% Campbell: 60–70% Bigger: 40–50% No Data/Vote
Governor before election
Jeremiah Morrow
Democratic-Republican
Elected Governor
Allen Trimble
National Republican

The 1826 Ohio gubernatorial election was held on October 10, 1826, in order to elect the Governor of Ohio. National Republican candidate and former Acting Governor Allen Trimble defeated Democratic-Republican candidates Alexander Campbell, Benjamin Tappan and John Bigger.

== General election ==
On election day, October 10, 1826, National Republican candidate Allen Trimble won the election by a margin of 66,710 votes against his foremost opponent Democratic-Republican candidate Alexander Campbell, thereby gaining National Republican control over the office of Governor. Trimble was sworn in as the 10th Governor of Ohio on December 19, 1826.

=== Results ===
Ohio gubernatorial election, 1826
| Party | Candidate | Votes | % |
|---|---|---|---|
| National Republican | Allen Trimble | 71,475 | 84.35% |
| Democratic-Republican | Alexander Campbell | 4,765 | 5.62% |
| Democratic-Republican | Benjamin Tappan | 4,192 | 4.95% |
| Democratic-Republican | John Bigger | 4,114 | 4.86% |
| | Scattering | 187 | 0.22% |
| Total votes | | 84,733 | 100.00% |
| National Republican gain from Democratic-Republican | | | |
