= Thomas C. Browne =

American judge

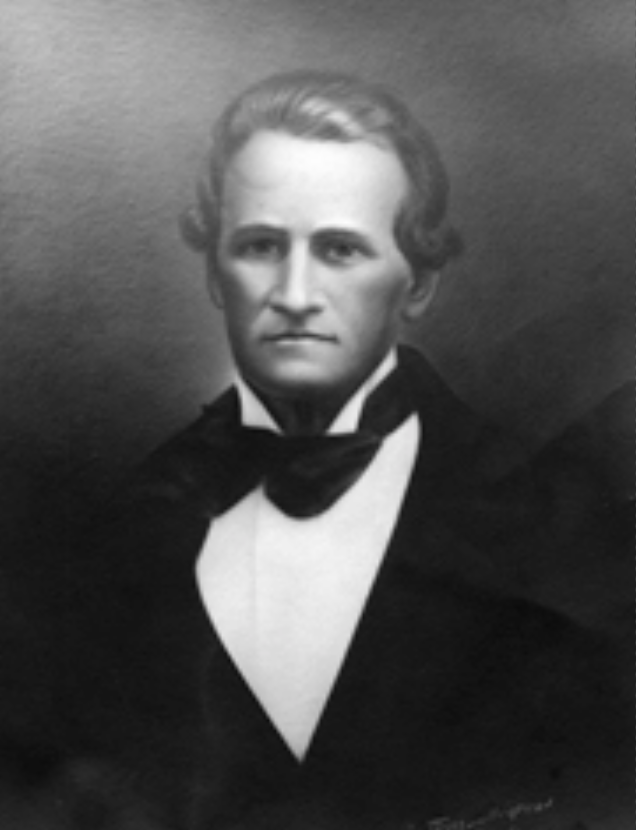
- Browne's portrait at the Illinois Supreme Court.
- Born: c. 1792; Kentucky, U.S.
- Died: November 4, 1862 (aged 70); San Francisco, California, U.S.
- Occupation(s): jurist and politician

Thomas C. Browne (c. 1792 – November 4, 1862) was an American jurist and politician from Kentucky and Illinois.

Browne was born in Kentucky around 1792. He moved to Shawneetown, Illinois in 1812. He was elected to the Legislature of the Illinois Territory in 1814 as a representative of Gallatin County, and again in 1816 as a member of the Legislative Council. Browne was appointed to the Illinois Supreme Court in 1818, and re-appointed on January 19, 1825. In 1841 Browne was assigned to the 6th Judicial Circuit of the newly expanded Court. He was accused of incompetence in 1843, but was defended by Abraham Lincoln and the charges were dropped. Browne lost his seat in 1848, when a new Illinois Constitution reduced the justices from nine to three. He died on November 4, 1862, in San Francisco.

== Bibliography ==
- Scott, John M. (1896). Supreme Court of Illinois, 1818. Bloomington, IL: Bloomington, Ill. pp. 75–100.
