= Joseph Phillips (judge) =

American judge

1st Chief Justice of the Supreme Court of Illinois
- In office October 9, 1818 – July 4, 1822
- Preceded by: Office established
- Succeeded by: Thomas Reynolds

Secretary of the Illinois Territory
- In office December 6, 1816 – October 9, 1818
- Preceded by: Nathaniel Pope
- Succeeded by: Office abolished*

Personal details
- Born: October 6, 1784 Kentucky
- Died: July 25, 1857 (aged 72) Rutherford County, Tennessee
- Party: Democratic

Joseph B. Phillips (October 6, 1784 – July 25, 1857) was an American politician and judge from Tennessee. He was a Democrat.

Phillips was born in Kentucky in the late 18th century, and his family moved to Tennessee, where he received a classical education. He was admitted to the bar in Rutherford County, Tennessee, in 1809. He served in the US Army in the War of 1812 as a captain. He led his regiment to Fort Massac in 1812, and stayed in Illinois after the war. Phillips was the second and last Secretary of Illinois Territory serving from December 6, 1816, until October 9, 1818. In 1818, upon the admission of Illinois to the union, Phillips was elected the first chief justice of the Illinois Supreme Court, inaugurated on October 9, 1818, serving until July 4, 1822, when he resigned to run for Governor of Illinois on a pro-slavery platform, and was defeated. After this defeat, he returned to his home state of Tennessee. He died in 1857 in Rutherford County, Tennessee, at the age of 73.
