= Adolphus Hubbard =

American politician

Adolphus Frederick Hubbard (ca. 1785 – 27 August 1832) was an American politician. Between 1822 and 1826, he served as Lieutenant Governor of Illinois.

== Life ==
Adolphus Hubbard was born in Warren County, Kentucky. At the time of his birth, this area still belonged to Virginia. In his early years, he moved to Shawneetown in the Illinois Territory, which became the state of Illinois in 1818. He studied law and practiced as a lawyer. Hubbard joined the Democratic-Republican Party and became a member of the constitutional convention. In 1820, he was a member of the Electoral College, voting for James Monroe.

In 1822 Hubbard was elected to the office of the Lieutenant Governor of Illinois. He served in this position between December 5, 1822, and December 6, 1826, when his term ended. In this function he was the deputy of Governor Edward Coles. Hubbard was very ambitious. He tried unsuccessfully to be appointed to the U.S. Senate. In 1825, Governor Coles was absent from the state for several weeks, and Hubbard fulfilled his duties during this time. After the return of the Governor Hubbard was not prepared to step down to his original position as Lieutenant Governor. He constructed some arguments that would allow him to officially execute the functions of the state's Governor. The case was brought to Court and Hubbard's claim was rejected. In 1826 Hubbard ran unsuccessfully in the regular elections for the Governor's office.

After the end of his term as Lieutenant Governor, Hubbard did not hold any other political office. He died on 27 August 1832 in Quincy, Illinois.

Political offices
Preceded by Pierre Menard	Lieutenant Governor of Illinois; 1822–1826	Succeeded by William Kinney
