= Hiam =

Hiam or HIAM may refer to

- Hiam (given name)
- Hiam, Ontario, Canada
- Hiam District, Houaphanh Province, Laos
- Hiam, a 1998 novel by Eva Sallis
- Heads of Intelligence Agencies Meeting of the Australian Intelligence Community
- Hoffmann Institute of Advanced Materials, at Shenzhen Polytechnic in Shenzhen, China
- "Hold It Against Me", a 2011 song by Britney Spears
