= Don Showalter =

External videos
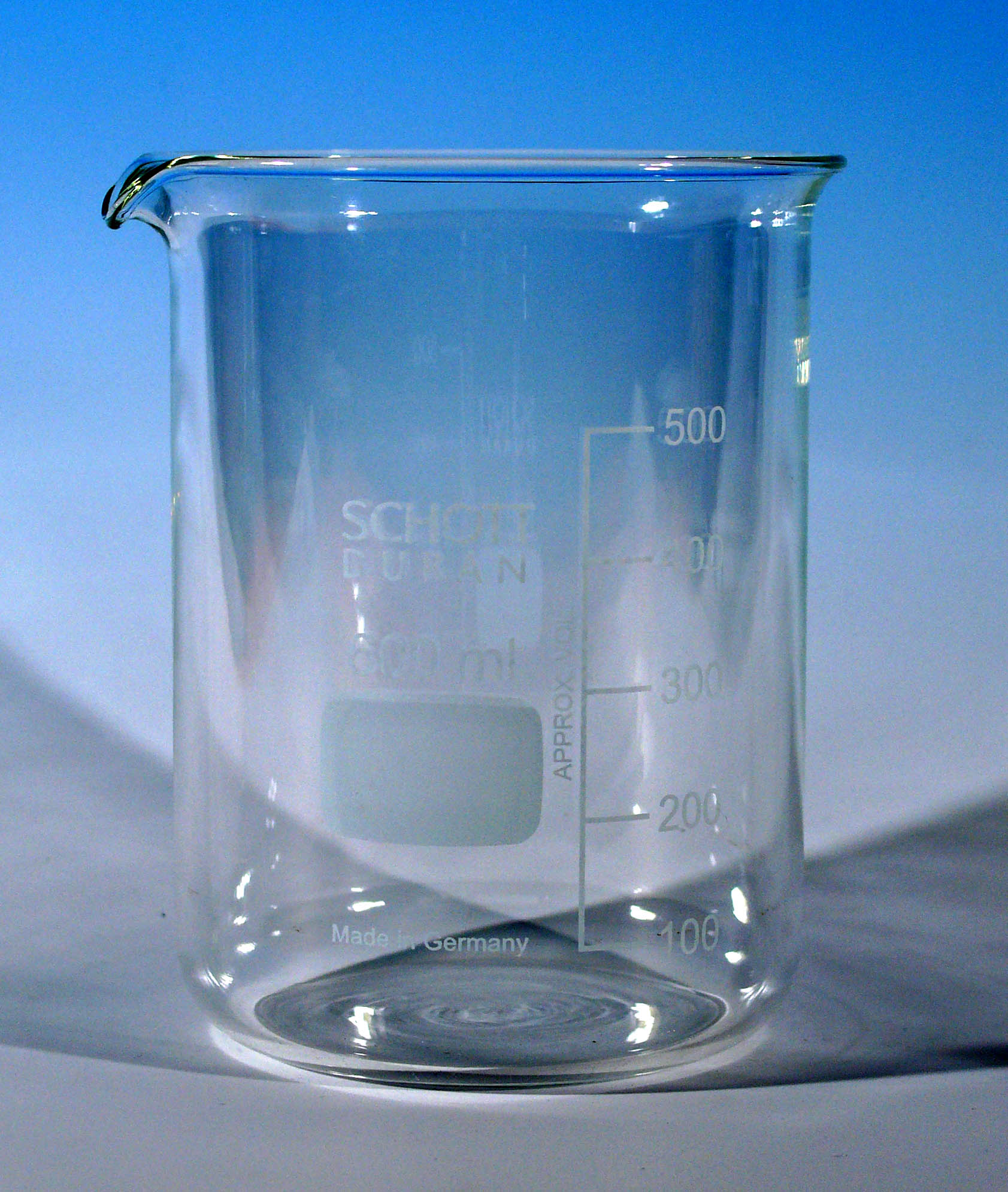
- "The World of Chemistry", Don Showalter, Annenberg Learner

Donald L. Showalter is a professor emeritus and former chairman of the department of chemistry at the University of Wisconsin–Stevens Point.

Born in Louisville, Kentucky, he attended Saint Xavier High School. Afterwards, he received his bachelor's degree from Eastern Kentucky University in 1964 and his Ph.D. in 1970 from the University of Kentucky. He spent one year as a research fellow at Oregon State University's Radiation Center before moving to UWSP in 1971. For a brief time (1973–1976) he taught at Iowa Western Community College before returning to UWSP, where he would receive many teaching awards, such as the University of Wisconsin Board of Regents Excellence in Teaching Award in 1994. In September 2006 he won the Helen M. Free Award for Public Outreach.

In 1988 Showalter became the series demonstrator in a 26-program PBS education series by Annenberg/CPB, The World of Chemistry, opposite with series host, Nobel prize winner Roald Hoffmann. While Hoffmann introduced a series of concepts and ideas, Showalter provided a series of demonstrations and other visual representations to help students and viewers to better understand the information.
