= Richard E. Dickerson =

American biochemist (1931–2025)

- Born: October 8, 1931; Casey, Illinois, U.S.
- Died: May 14, 2025 (aged 93); Pasadena, California, U.S.
- Citizenship: American
- Education: Carnegie Institute of Technology (BS), University of Minnesota (PhD)
- Known for: "Dickerson dodecamer": C-G-C-G-A-A-T-T-C-G-C-G
- Spouse: Lola Dickerson
- Children: Ian, Daniel, Joyce, Sara, Lise
- Scientific career
- Fields: Biochemistry, crystallography
- Institutions: University of Cambridge (post-doc); UCLA; Lincoln College and Laboratory of Molecular Biophysics at Oxford University
- Doctoral advisor: William N. Lipscomb
- Other academic advisors: John C. Kendrew

Richard Earl Dickerson (October 8, 1931 – May 14, 2025) was an American biochemist. He was the first to carry out a single-crystal structure analysis of B-DNA, with what has become known as the "Dickerson dodecamer": C-G-C-G-A-A-T-T-C-G-C-G. At UCLA he continued his investigations of the structures of A- and B-DNA, and of complexes between DNA and drugs or proteins. He was elected to the National Academy of Sciences and American Academy of Arts and Sciences in 1985. During the academic year 1997–1998, Dickerson was the Newton-Abraham Visiting professor in Medical, Biological and Chemical Science at Lincoln College and the Laboratory of Molecular Biophysics at Oxford University.

From 2013, Dickerson was listed on the Advisory Council of the National Center for Science Education.

== Education ==
- B.S. in chemistry from Carnegie Institute of Technology in 1953.
- Ph.D. in physical chemistry in 1957 at the University of Minnesota, studying the structures of boron hydrides under the direction of future Nobel Laureate Professor William N. Lipscomb.
- Postdoc for two years at the University of Cambridge with John C. Kendrew.

== Appointments and positions held ==
- Professor emeritus, department of chemistry and biochemistry, UCLA, US
- Professor, department of Chemistry and Chemical Engineering, Caltech, US <textbook, Chemical Principles>
