= Jing Li (chemist) =

Chinese chemist

Jing Li (Chinese: 李静) is a Board of Governors Professor of Chemistry and Chemical Biology at Rutgers University, New Jersey, United States. She and her team are engaged in solid-state, inorganic and inorganic-organic hybrid materials research. Her current research focuses on designing and developing new functional materials including metal-organic frameworks and hybrid semiconductors for applications in the field of renewable and sustainable energy, and clean environment.

Li's research has resulted in 12 issued patents and over 460 publications (articles, invited book chapters, feature and review papers), in high impact factor journals such as Science Magazine, Nature Communications, the Journal of the American Chemical Society (JACS), Advanced Materials and Angewandte Chemie International Edition. She was selected as a Highly Cited Researcher by Thomson Reuters in 2015 and 2016, and by Clarivate Analytics in 2019, 2020 and 2022.

== Education ==
Li completed her undergraduate studies in China, and received her master's degree from the State University of New York at Albany. She obtained her PhD degree in January 1990 at Cornell University under the supervision of Professor Roald Hoffmann, the 1981 Nobel Prize laureate in Chemistry. She continued to work at Cornell as a postdoc for two years (1989–1991) with Professor Francis "Frank" J. DiSalvo before taking an academic position at Rutgers University.

== Professional career ==
Li joined the Rutgers Faculty as an assistant professor in 1991, where she was promoted to associate professor in 1996, full professor in 1999, and distinguished professor in 2006. Her current research group consists of postdoc associates, graduate students, visiting scientists, exchange graduate students and undergraduate students. Li has developed and taught 17 different undergraduate and graduate courses since her first appointment with the university.

== Research ==
Li's focus of research includes areas of solid-state inorganic and materials chemistry. Her current research focuses on the development of new and functional materials that are fundamentally important and relevant for clean and renewable energy applications. These include (a) metal organic frameworks (MOFs) for gas storage and separation, carbon dioxide capture, waste remediation and chemical sensing, and energy efficient lighting applications; These materials are made of a metal ion or metal cluster such as transition metals and organic ligands such as carboxylate groups and nitrogen containing molecules; (b) inorganic-organic hybrid semiconductors for optoelectronic devices such as photovoltaics and solid-state lighting. These crystalline compounds consist of both inorganic and organic structure motifs. They combine the good features of the two components, resulting in enhanced and improved properties.

== Awards ==
Jing Li has received numerous awards and honors for her academic achievements, including:

- Henry Rutgers Research Fellow, Rutgers University, 1991–1993
- Henry Dreyfus Teacher-Scholar, The Camille & Henry Dreyfus Foundation, 1994–1998
- Presidential Faculty Fellow, The National Science Foundation, 1995–2000
- NSF CAREER Award, The National Science Foundation, 1995
- The Board of Trustees Fellowship for Scholarly Excellence, Rutgers University, 1996
- Outstanding Achievement Award, Chinese Association of Science and Technology, US, 2002
- The U.S. Clean Energy Education and Empowerment (C3E) Award, The Department of Energy, 2012
- Elected Fellow of the American Association for the Advancement of Science (AAAS), 2012
- The Humboldt Research Award (Humboldt Prize), Alexander von Humboldt Foundation, 2013
- Board of Trustees Award for Excellence in Research, Rutgers University, 2013
- Fellow of the Royal Society of Chemistry, The Royal Society of Chemistry, 2015
