= Roald Hoffmann =

Nobel laureate theoretical chemist

Roald Hoffmann ForMemRS
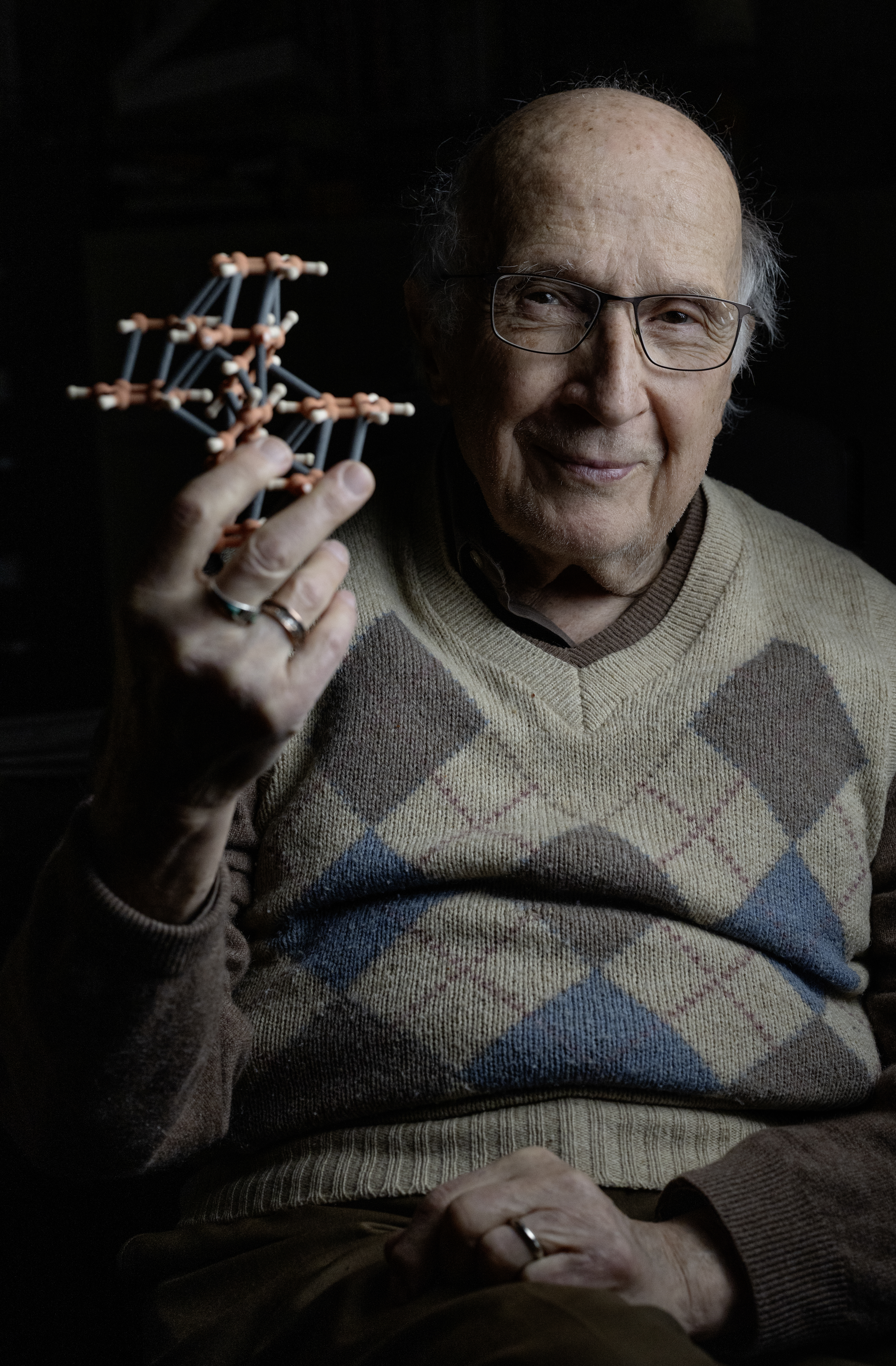
- Hoffmann in 2025
- Born: Roald Safran; July 18, 1937 (age 89); Złoczów, Second Polish Republic
- Education: Columbia University; Harvard University
- Known for: Woodward–Hoffmann rules Extended Hückel method Isolobal principle
- Spouse: Eva Börjesson (m. 1960)
- Children: 2
- Awards: Nobel Prize in Chemistry (1981); William H. Nichols Medal (1981); National Medal of Science (1983); NAS Award in Chemical Sciences (1986); Priestley Medal (1990); Lomonosov Gold Medal (2011)
- Scientific career
- Fields: Theoretical Chemistry
- Workplaces: Cornell University
- Thesis: Theory of Polyhedral Molecules: Second Quantization and Hypochromism in Helices. (1962)
- Doctoral advisor: William N. Lipscomb, Jr.; Martin Gouterman
- Doctoral students: Jing Li
- Other notable students: Jeffrey R. Long (undergraduate), Karen Goldberg (undergraduate)
- Website: www.roaldhoffmann.com

Roald Hoffmann (born Roald Safran; July 18, 1937) is a Polish-American theoretical chemist who shared the 1981 Nobel Prize in Chemistry with Kenichi Fukui “for their theories, developed independently, concerning the course of chemical reactions”. He has also published plays, poetry and popular science. He is the Frank H. T. Rhodes Professor of Humane Letters Emeritus at Cornell University.

== Early life ==
=== Escape from the Holocaust ===
Hoffmann was born in Złoczów, Poland (now Zolochiv, Ukraine), to a Polish-Jewish family, and was named in honor of the Norwegian explorer Roald Amundsen. His parents were Clara (Rosen), a teacher, and Hillel Safran, a civil engineer. After Germany invaded Poland and occupied the town, his family was placed in a labor camp where his father, who was familiar with much of the local infrastructure, was a valued prisoner. As the situation grew more dangerous, with prisoners being transferred to extermination camps, the family bribed guards to allow an escape. They arranged with a Ukrainian neighbor named Mykola Dyuk for Hoffmann, his mother, two uncles and an aunt to hide in the attic and a storeroom of the local schoolhouse, where they remained for eighteen months, from January 1943 to June 1944, while Hoffmann was aged 5 to 7.

His father remained at the labor camp, but was able to occasionally visit, until he was tortured and killed by the Germans for his involvement in a plot to arm the camp prisoners. When she received the news, his mother attempted to contain her sorrow by writing down her feelings in a notebook her husband had been using to take notes on a relativity textbook he had been reading. While in hiding his mother kept Hoffmann entertained by teaching him to read and having him memorize geography from textbooks stored in the attic, then quizzing him on it. He referred to the experience as having been enveloped in a cocoon of love. In 1944 they moved to Kraków where his mother remarried. They adopted her new husband's surname Hoffmann.

Most of the rest of the family was killed in the Holocaust, though one grandmother and a few others survived. They migrated to the United States on the troop carrier Ernie Pyle in 1949.

Hoffmann visited Zolochiv with his adult son (by then a parent of a five-year-old) in 2006 and found that the attic where he had hidden was still intact, but the storeroom had been incorporated, ironically enough, into a chemistry classroom. In 2009, a monument to Holocaust victims was built in Zolochiv on Hoffmann's initiative.

== Personal life ==
Hoffmann married Eva Börjesson in 1960. They have two children, Hillel Jan and Ingrid Helena.

He describes himself as "an atheist who is moved by religion."

=== Education and academic credentials ===
Hoffmann graduated in 1955 from New York City's Stuyvesant High School, where he won a Westinghouse science scholarship. He received his Bachelor of Arts degree at Columbia University (Columbia College) in 1958. He earned his Master of Arts degree in 1960 from Harvard University. He earned his doctor of philosophy degree from Harvard University while working under joint supervision of Martin Gouterman and subsequent 1976 Nobel Prize in Chemistry winner William N. Lipscomb Jr. Hoffman worked on the molecular orbital theory of polyhedral molecules. Under Lipscomb's direction the Extended Hückel method was developed by Lawrence Lohr and by Roald Hoffmann. This method was later extended by Hoffmann. In 1965, he went to Cornell University and has remained there, where he is a professor emeritus.

== Scientific research ==
External videos
- “Chemistry's Essential Tension”, Roald Hoffman, Dartmouth College
- “Roald Hoffmann Shares Discovery Through Chemistry”, Roald Hoffman, National Science Foundation

Hoffmann's research and interests have been in the electronic structure of stable and unstable molecules, and in the study of transition states in reactions. He has investigated the structure and reactivity of both organic and inorganic molecules, and examined problems in organo-metallic and solid-state chemistry. Hoffman has developed semiempirical and nonempirical computational tools and methods such as the extended Hückel method which he proposed in 1963 for determining molecular orbitals.

With Robert Burns Woodward he developed the Woodward–Hoffmann rules for elucidating reaction mechanisms and their stereochemistry. They realized that chemical transformations could be approximately predicted from subtle symmetries and asymmetries in the electron orbitals of complex molecules. Their rules predict differing outcomes, such as the types of products that will be formed when two compounds are activated by heat compared with those produced under activation by light. For this work Hoffmann received the 1981 Nobel Prize in chemistry, sharing it with Japanese chemist Kenichi Fukui, who had independently resolved similar issues. (Woodward was not included in the prize, which is given only to living persons, although he had won the 1965 prize for other work.) In his Nobel Lecture, Hoffmann introduced the isolobal analogy for predicting the bonding properties of organometallic compounds.

Some of Hoffman's most recent work, with Neil Ashcroft and Vanessa Labet, examines bonding in matter under extreme high pressure.

What gives me the greatest joy in this work? That as we tease apart what goes on in hydrogen under pressures such as those that one finds at the center of the earth, two explanations subtly contend with each other ... [physical and chemical] ... Hydrogen under extreme pressure is doing just what an inorganic molecule at 1 atmosphere does!

== Artistic interests ==
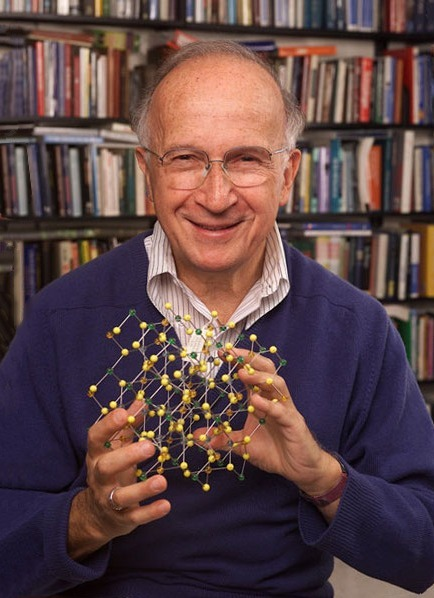
Hoffmann in 2009

=== The World Of Chemistry with Roald Hoffmann ===
In 1988 Hoffmann became the series host in a 26-program PBS education series by Annenberg/CPB, The World of Chemistry, opposite with series demonstrator Don Showalter. While Hoffmann introduced a series of concepts and ideas, Showalter provided a series of demonstrations and other visual representations to help students and viewers to better understand the information.

=== Entertaining Science ===
Since the spring of 2001, Hoffmann has been the host of the monthly series Entertaining Science at New York City's Cornelia Street Cafe, which explores the juncture between the arts and science.

=== Non-fiction ===
He has published books on the connections between art and science: Roald Hoffmann on the Philosophy, Art, and Science of Chemistry and Beyond the Finite: The Sublime in Art and Science.

His 1995 book, The Same and Not the Same, a further exploration of chemistry's dualities, was translated into five languages and received the Literaturpreis of the Verband der Chemischen Industrie. With Shira Leibowitz Schmidt he wrote Old Wine, New Flasks: Reflections on Science and Jewish Tradition (W. H. Freeman, 1997).

=== Poetry ===
Hoffmann is also a poet. His collections include The Metamict State (1987, ISBN 0-8130-0869-7), Gaps and Verges (1990, ISBN 0-8130-0943-X), Chemistry Imagined (1993, ISBN 978-1-56098-539-6, co-produced with artist Vivian Torrence), Memory Effects (Calhoun Press, 1999), Soliton (Truman State University Press, 2002), and Constants of the Motion (Dos Madres Press, 2020, ISBN 978-1-953252-06-7). A Spanish-language collection, Los hombres y las moléculas, was published in 2023. His sixth English-language collection, Theory of Dreams, was published by Dos Madres Press in 2026.

=== Plays ===
He co-authored with Carl Djerassi the play Oxygen, about the discovery of oxygen and the experience of being a scientist. Hoffman's play, "Should've" (2006) about ethics in science and art, has been produced in workshops, as has a play based on his experiences in the holocaust, "We Have Something That Belongs to You" (2009), later retitled "Something That Belongs to You.

== Honors and awards ==
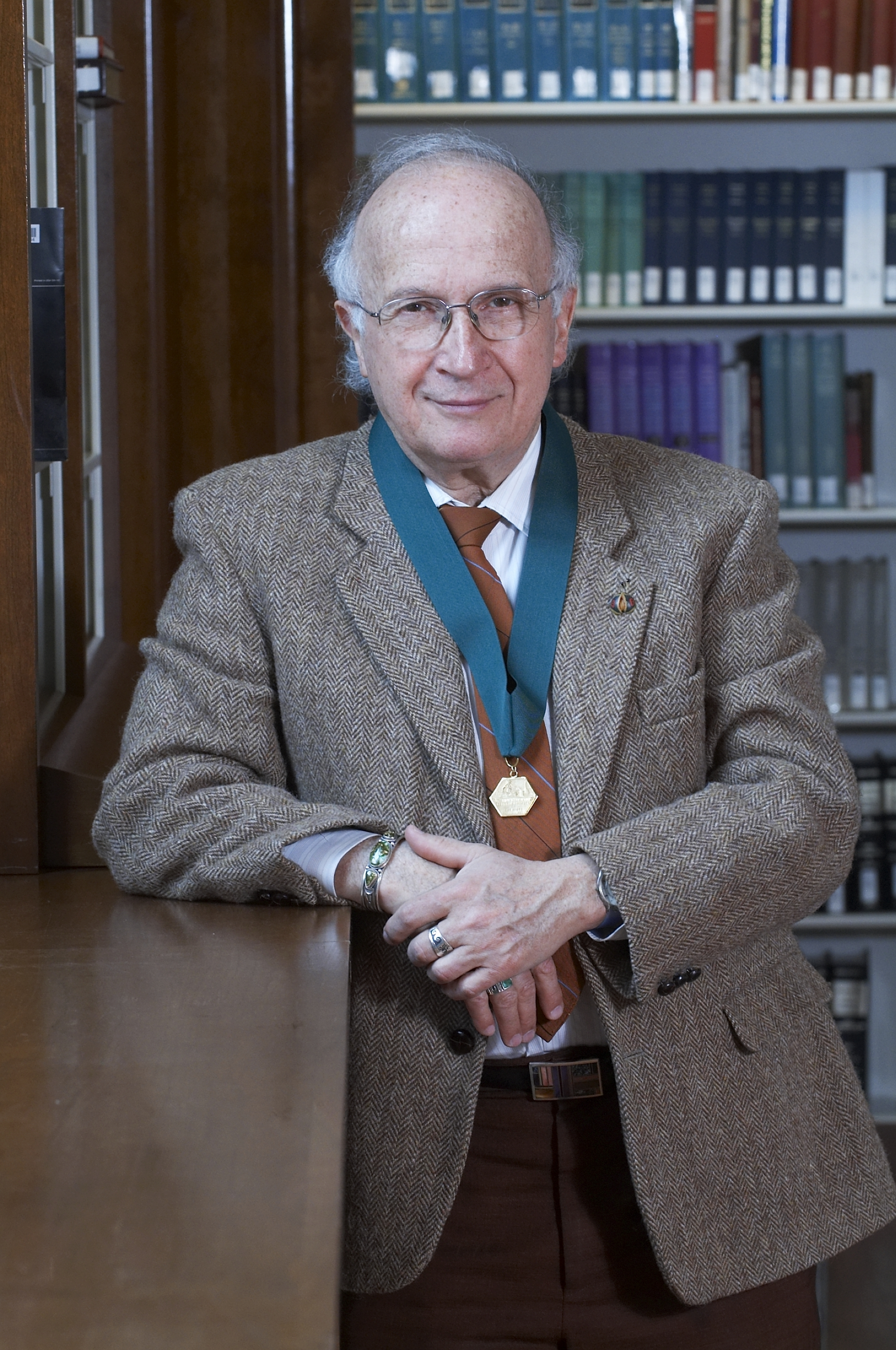
Roald Hoffmann with the AIC Gold Medal

=== Nobel Prize in Chemistry ===
In 1981, Hoffmann received the Nobel Prize in Chemistry, which he shared with Kenichi Fukui "for their theories, developed independently, concerning the course of chemical reactions".

=== Other awards ===
Hoffmann has won many other awards, and is the recipient of more than 25 honorary degrees.

- ACS Award in Pure Chemistry, 1969
- Award of the International Academy of Quantum Molecular Science, 1970, "pour sa methode de calcul des fonctions d'onde moleculaires et pour ses etudes theoriques des reactions chimiques"
- Fellow of the American Academy of Arts and Sciences, elected 1971
- Elected member of the National Academy of Sciences, elected 1972
- Arthur C. Cope Award in Organic Chemistry, 1973 (with Robert B. Woodward)
- Nobel Prize in Chemistry, 1981
- Inorganic Chemistry Award (American Chemical Society), 1982 (sponsored by Monsanto)
- National Medal of Science, 1983
- Fellow of the American Philosophical Society, elected 1984
- Elected a Foreign Member of the Royal Society (ForMemRS) in 1984
- Foreign Member of the Royal Swedish Academy of Sciences, elected 1985
- Foreign Member of the Finnish Society of Sciences and Letters, elected 1988
- Priestley Medal, 1990
- Harvard Centennial Medalist, 1994
- Pimentel Award in Chemical Education, 1996
- E.A. Wood Science Writing Award, 1997
- Literaturpreis of the Verband der Chemischen Industrie for his textbook The Same and Not The Same, 1997
- Kolos Medal, 1998
- American Institute of Chemists Gold Medal, 2006
- James T. Grady-James H. Stack Award for Interpreting Chemistry, 2009
- Fellow of the American Chemical Society, 2009
- Fellow of the Kosciuszko Foundation of Eminent Scientists of Polish Origin and Ancestry, 2014
- Ullyot Public Affairs Lecture, Science History Institute, 2019
- Marie Curie Medal of the Polish Chemical Society, 2019

Hoffmann is a member of the International Academy of Quantum Molecular Science and the Board of Sponsors of The Bulletin of the Atomic Scientists.

In August 2007, the American Chemical Society held a symposium at its biannual national meeting to honor Hoffmann's 70th birthday.

In 2008, the Göttingen Academy of Sciences and Humanities awarded him its Lichtenberg Medal.

In August 2017, another symposium was held at the 254th American Chemical Society National Meeting in Washington DC, to honor Hoffmann's 80th birthday.

The Hoffmann Institute of Advanced Materials in Shenzhen, named after him, was founded in his honor in February 2018 and formally opened in his presence in May 2019.

In 2023, Roald Hoffmann was named by Carnegie Corporation of New York as an honoree of the Great Immigrants Awards.

== See also ==
- List of Jewish Nobel laureates
- List of signees of the 2022 open letter from Nobel laureates in support of Ukraine
