= The World of Chemistry =

- Genre: Educational (Science)
- Directed by: Isidore Adler, Nava Ben-Zvi
- Presented by: Dr. Roald Hoffmann
- Starring: Dr. Don Showalter
- Country of origin: United States
- Original language: English
- No. of seasons: 1
- No. of episodes: 26

Production
- Executive producer: Richard Thomas
- Running time: 30 minutes

Original release
- Network: PBS
- Release: 1990

Related
- The Mechanical Universe, Earth Revealed

The World of Chemistry is a television series on introductory chemistry hosted by Nobel Prize-winning chemist Roald Hoffmann. The series consists of 26 half-hour video programs, along with coordinated books, which explore various topics in chemistry through experiments conducted by Stevens Point emeritus professor Don Showalter the "series demonstrator" and interviews with working chemists, it also includes physics and earth science related components. The series was produced by the University of Maryland, College Park and the Educational Film Center and was funded by the Annenberg/CPB Project (now the Annenberg Foundation), it was filmed in 1988 and first aired on PBS in 1990. This series supports science standards recognized nationally by the United States (NSTA and NCSESA) and is still widely used in high school and college chemistry courses. The entire series was previously available on learner.org for free in an online video streaming format, but streaming for this series was discontinued on June 25, 2019.

== Awards ==
The awards won by The World of Chemistry are given below

- American Film and Video Festival
  1990 Finalist Award for "On the Surface"
- Columbus International Film and Video Festival
  1991 Honorable Mention Award for "Color"
- Houston International Film Festival "Worldfest Houston"
  1991 Silver Award for "Color"
- National Educational Film and Video Festival
  1990 Gold Apple Award for "The Periodic Table"

== List of episodes ==
1. The World of Chemistry
  - The relationships of chemistry to the other sciences and to everyday life are presented.
2. Color
  - The search for new colors in the mid-19th century boosted the development of modern chemistry.
3. Measurement: The Foundation of Chemistry
  - The distinction between accuracy and precision and its importance in commerce and science are explained.
4. Modeling the Unseen
  - Models are used to explain phenomena that are beyond the realm of ordinary perception.
5. A Matter of State
  - Matter is examined in its three principal states — gases, liquids, and solids — relating the visible world to the submicroscopic.
6. The Atom
  - Viewers journey inside the atom to appreciate its architectural beauty and grasp how atomic structure determines chemical behavior.
7. The Periodic Table
  - The development and arrangement of the periodic table of elements is examined.
8. Chemical Bonds
  - The differences between ionic and covalent bonds are explained by the use of scientific models and examples from nature.
9. Molecular Architecture
  - The program examines isomers and how the electronic structure of a molecule's elements and bonds affects its shape and physical properties.
10. Signals From Within
  - Chemists' knowledge of the interaction of radiation and matter is the basis for analytical methods of sensitivity and specificity.
11. The Mole
  - Using Avogadro's law, the mass of a substance can be related to the number of particles contained in that mass.
12. Water
  - The special chemical properties of water are explored, along with the need for its protection and conservation.
13. The Driving Forces
  - Endothermic and exothermic reactions are investigated and the role of entropy is revealed.
14. Molecules in Action
  - Observing molecules during chemical reactions helps explain the role of catalysts. Dynamic equilibrium is also demonstrated.
15. The Busy Electron
  - The principles of electrochemical cell design are explained through batteries, sensors, and a solar-powered car.
16. The Proton in Chemistry
  - Demonstrations explain pH and how it is measured, and the important role of acids and bases.
17. The Precious Envelope
  - The Earth's atmosphere is examined through theories of chemical evolution; ozone depletion and the greenhouse effect are explained.
18. The Chemistry of the Earth
  - Silicon, a cornerstone of the high-tech industry, is one of the elements of the Earth highlighted in this program.
19. Metals
  - Malleability, ductility, and conductivity are examined, along with methods for extracting metals from ores and blending alloys.
20. On the Surface
  - Surface science examines how surfaces react with each other at the molecular level.
21. Carbon
  - The versatility of carbon's molecular structures and the enormous range of properties of its compounds are presented.
22. The Age of Polymers
  - How chemists control the molecular structure to create polymers with special properties is explored.
23. Proteins: Structure and Function
  - The program examines proteins — polymers built from only 20 basic amino acids.
24. The Genetic Code
  - The structure and role of the nucleic acids, DNA and RNA, are investigated.
25. Chemistry and the Environment
  - Dump site waste management demonstrates chemistry's benefits and problems.
26. Futures
  - Interviews with leaders from academia and industry explore the frontiers of chemical research.
