= Lipscombite =

Phosphate mineral

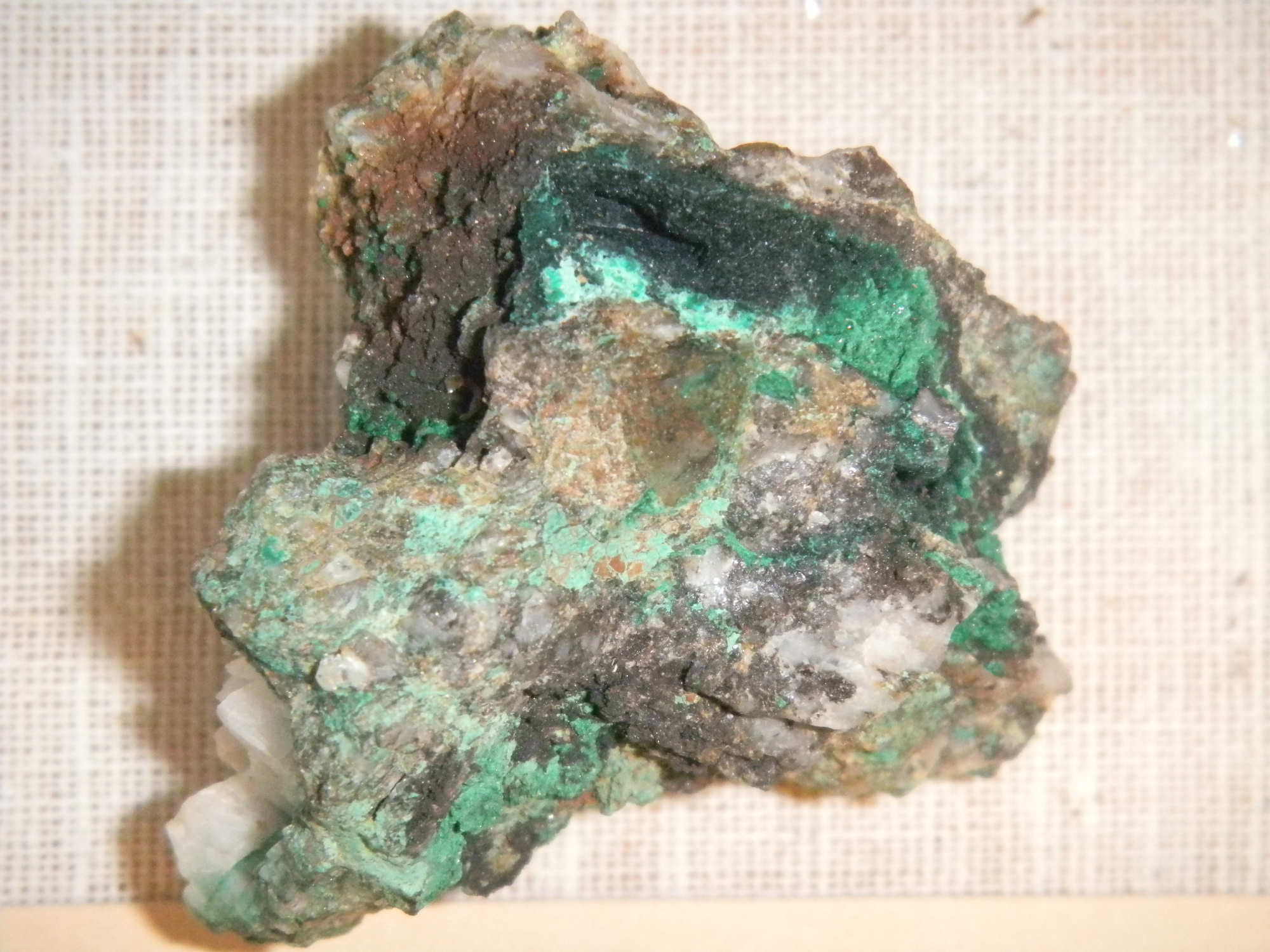
- Lipscombite: Small green crystals on quartz, Harvard Museum of Natural History

General
- Category: Phosphate minerals
- Formula: (Fe^{2+},Mn^{2+})(Fe^{3+})_{2}(PO_{4})_{2}(OH)_{2}
- IMA symbol: Lcb
- Strunz classification: 8.BB.90
- Dana classification: 41.10.02.01
- Crystal system: Tetragonal
- Crystal class: Trapezohedral (422) (same H-M symbol)
- Space group: P4_{3}2_{1}2
- Unit cell: a = 5.37, c = 12.81 [Å]; Z = 4

Identification
- Formula mass: 391.27 g/mol
- Color: Green gray, olive green, black.
- Specific gravity: 3.68
- Optical properties: Translucent to opaque

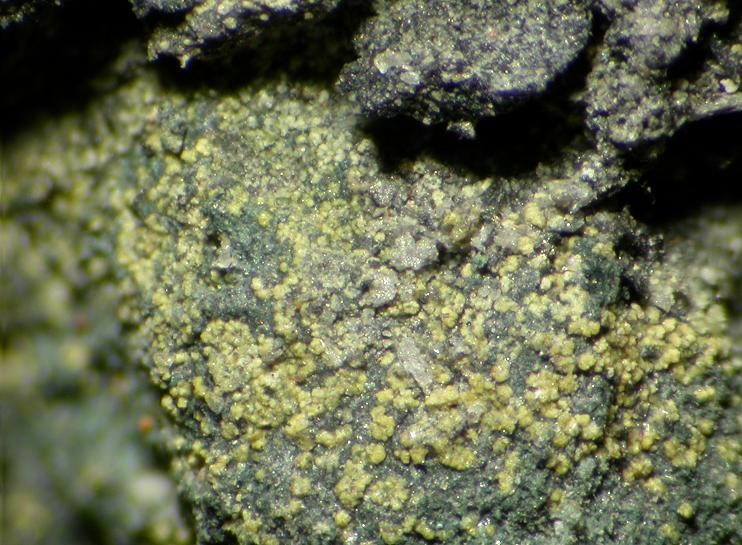
Lipscombite: Small yellowish-green crystals, Lichtenberg Absetzer Mine dump, Ronneburg Uranium deposit, Gera, Thuringia, Germany

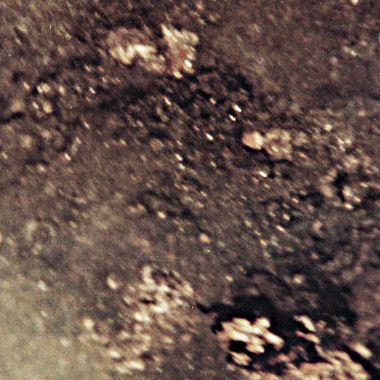
Lipscombite: Small black crystals on dark background. Smithsonian National Museum of Natural History

Lipscombite (Fe^{2+},Mn^{2+})(Fe^{3+})_{2}(PO_{4})_{2}(OH)_{2} is a green gray, olive green, or black. phosphate-based mineral containing iron, manganese, and iron phosphate.

Lipscombite is often formed at meteorite impact sites where its crystals are microscopically small, because crystal-forming conditions of pressure and temperature are brief.

In the Classification of non-silicate minerals lipscombite is in the lipscombite group, which also includes zinclipscombite. This group is within the non-silicate, category 8, anhydrous phosphates, lazulite supergroup.

== Discovery ==
The mineral lipscombite was first made artificially and then found in nature. It was named after chemist William Lipscomb by the mineralogist John W. Gruner who first made it artificially.

While investigating the stability relations of iron oxides small, black, shiny crystals were obtained when a spherical iron pressure-temperature vessel was contaminated with phosphorus. The x-ray powder diffraction pattern was similar to lazulite, but unknown.

Gruner, a mineralogist at the University of Minnesota, gave Lipscomb, a chemistry professor there, the crystals for Lewis Katz and Lipscomb to determine the atomic structure using single-crystal x-ray diffraction. They initially called the mineral iron lazulite.
