= Zinclipscombite =

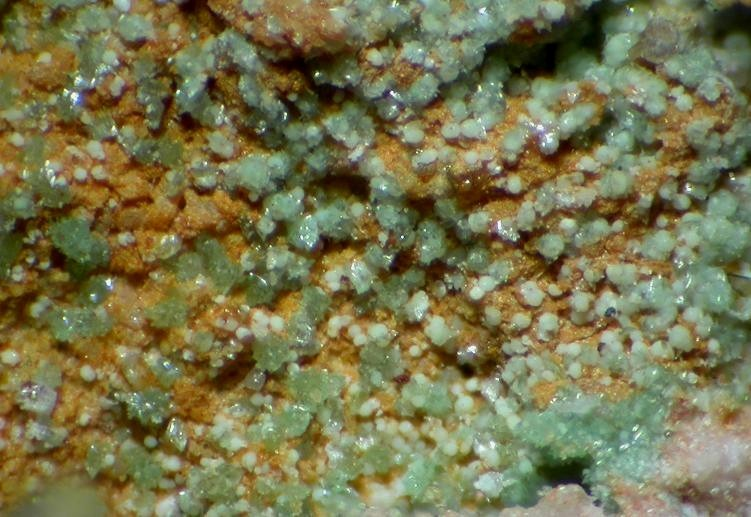
- Zinclipscombite: Pale green balls and crystal clusters. Silver Coin Mine, Valmy, Iron Point District, Humboldt Co., Nevada, US

General
- Category: Phosphate mineral
- Formula: Zn(Fe^{3+})_{2}(PO_{4})_{2}(OH)_{2}
- IMA symbol: Zlcb
- Strunz classification: 8.BB.90
- Dana classification: 41.10.02.02
- Crystal system: Tetragonal
- Crystal class: Trapezohedral (422); H-M symbol: (4 2 2)
- Space group: P4_{3}2_{1}2
- Unit cell: a = 7.242, c = 13.125 [Å]; Z = 4

Identification
- Formula mass: 386.04 g/mol
- Color: Dark green to brown
- Cleavage: None
- Fracture: Brittle
- Mohs scale hardness: 5
- Luster: Vitreous
- Streak: Light green to tan
- Diaphaneity: Translucent
- Specific gravity: 3.65
- Optical properties: Uniaxial
- Refractive index: n_{ω} = 1.755, n_{ε} = 1.795
- Birefringence: 0.0400

Zinclipscombite is a dark-green to brown zinc iron phosphate mineral with the formula Zn(Fe^{3+})_{2}(PO_{4})_{2}(OH)_{2}. It occurs as fibrous spheres and exhibits tetragonal crystal structure.

In the classification of non-silicate minerals zinclipscombite is in the lipscombite group, which also includes lipscombite.

== Discovery ==
The mineral zinclipscombite was discovered and named by Chukanov, Pekov, Möckel, Zadov, and Dubinchuk from a sample from the Silver Coin mine, Edna Mountain, Valmy, Humboldt County, Nevada, United States. The new mineral name was approved in 2006 by the Commission on New Minerals and Mineral Names, International Mineralogical Association.
