= List of signees of the 2022 open letter from Nobel laureates in support of Ukraine =

Protest against the Russian invasion

The following is a list of the Nobel Prize laureates who signed an open letter in 2022 in support of Ukraine, following the start of the 2022 Russian invasion of Ukraine.

== Overview ==
On 24 February 2022, during the Russo-Ukrainian war, Russia launched a full-scale invasion of Ukraine, starting the current phase of the war, the largest conflict in Europe since World War II. By April 2022, the invasion's initial goal of a rapid Russian victory via decapitation had failed, with Ukraine pushing back the northern arm of the invasion and preventing the capture of Kyiv. Following this, the war transitioned to more conventional fighting in the south and east of Ukraine.

On 1 March 2022, an open letter from a group of Nobel Prize laureates was published in support of Ukraine. More than 200 Nobel laureates signed the letter, was published simultaneously in English, Russian and Ukrainian.

The signees expressed their support for the independence of the Ukrainian people and the freedom of the Ukrainian state, in the face of the invasion. The letter was published online on 2 March, after being circulated to Nobel laureates the previous day. It included a call for the withdrawal of Russian troops from Ukraine, and criticism of the unjustified atrocities of the invasion. The latter stated that the invasion violated the Charter of the United Nations. The letter also includes the view that it distinguishes between the actions and views of President of Russia Vladimir Putin, who ordered the invasion, and the Russian general public; the letter states that it does not believe that the Russian people are involved in, or responsible for, the invasion. Individual statements from former U.S. presidents Jimmy Carter and Barack Obama, and from the 14th Dalai Lama were included on the website with the letter.

The letter was drafted by Nobel laureate Roald Hoffmann, (Note: Hoffmann's Jewish family were hidden by Ukrainians from the Nazis for 18 months, from January 1943 to June 1944.) who sent his draft to fellow laureate Richard J. Roberts. Using Roberts' website nlcampaigns.org, where issues of concern to laureates can be publicized, the letter was shared, and the signatures were obtained.

== List of signatories ==
This is a list of signatories to the open letter, as of 1 April 2022.

Name	Nationality	Year of award	Area
Peter Agre	United States	2003	Chemistry
James P. Allison	United States	2018	Medicine
Harvey J. Alter	United States	2020	Medicine
Hiroshi Amano	Japan	2014	Physics
Werner Arber	Switzerland	1978	Medicine
Óscar Arias	Costa Rica	1987	Peace
Frances Arnold	United States	2018	Chemistry
Richard Axel	United States	2004	Medicine
David Baltimore	United States	1975	Medicine
Barry Barish	United States	2017	Physics
Georg Bednorz	Germany	1987	Physics
Carlos Filipe Ximenes Belo	East Timor	1996	Peace
Paul Berg	United States	1980	Chemistry
Bruce Beutler	United States	2011	Medicine
Elizabeth Blackburn	Australia / United States	2009	Medicine
Michael Stuart Brown	United States	1985	Medicine
Linda B. Buck	United States	2004	Medicine
William C. Campbell	Ireland / United States	2015	Medicine
Mario Capecchi	Italy / United States	2007	Medicine
Jimmy Carter	United States	2002	Peace
Thomas Cech	United States	1989	Chemistry
Martin Chalfie	United States	2008	Chemistry
Emmanuelle Charpentier	France	2020	Chemistry
Steven Chu	United States	1997	Physics
Aaron Ciechanover	Israel	2004	Chemistry
J. M. Coetzee	South Africa / Australia	2003	Literature
Elias James Corey	United States	1990	Chemistry
Robert Curl	United States	1996	Chemistry
Angus Deaton	United Kingdom	2015	Economics
Johann Deisenhofer	Germany	1988	Chemistry
Jennifer Doudna	United States	2020	Chemistry
Jacques Dubochet	Switzerland	2017	Chemistry
Shirin Ebadi	Iran	2003	Peace
Robert F. Engle	United States	2003	Economics
Gerhard Ertl	Germany	2007	Chemistry
Eugene Fama	United States	2013	Economics
Andrew Fire	United States	2006	Medicine
Joachim Frank	Germany / United States	2017	Chemistry
Jerome Isaac Friedman	United States	1990	Physics
Leymah Gbowee	Liberia	2011	Peace
Andre Geim	United Kingdom / Netherlands	2010	Physics
Reinhard Genzel	Germany	2020	Physics
Andrea M. Ghez	United States	2020	Physics
Sheldon Glashow	United States	1979	Physics
Joseph L. Goldstein	United States	1985	Medicine
Carol W. Greider	United States	2009	Medicine
David Gross	United States	2004	Physics
Duncan Haldane	United Kingdom / Slovenia	2016	Physics
Jeffrey C. Hall	United States	2017	Medicine
John L. Hall	United States	2005	Physics
Serge Haroche	France / Morocco	2012	Physics
Oliver Hart	United Kingdom / United States	2016	Economics
Leland H. Hartwell	United States	2001	Medicine
Klaus Hasselmann	Germany	2021	Physics
Harald zur Hausen	Germany	2008	Medicine
Richard Henderson	United Kingdom	2017	Chemistry
Dudley R. Herschbach	United States	1986	Chemistry
Avram Hershko	Hungary / Israel	2004	Chemistry
Roald Hoffmann	Poland / United States	1981	Chemistry
Jules A. Hoffmann	Luxembourg / France	2011	Medicine
Bengt Holmström	Finland	2016	Economics
Tasuku Honjo	Japan	2018	Medicine
Gerard 't Hooft	Netherlands	1999	Physics
H. Robert Horvitz	United States	2002	Medicine
Michael Houghton	United Kingdom	2020	Medicine
Robert Huber	Germany	1988	Chemistry
Tim Hunt	United Kingdom	2001	Medicine
Louis Ignarro	United States	1998	Medicine
Kazuo Ishiguro	United Kingdom / Japan	2017	Literature
Elfriede Jelinek	Austria	2004	Literature
David Julius	United States	2021	Medicine
William Kaelin Jr.	United States	2019	Medicine
Takaaki Kajita	Japan	2015	Physics
Eric Kandel	Austria / United States	2000	Medicine
Tawakkol Karman	Yemen / Turkey	2011	Peace
Wolfgang Ketterle	Germany / United States	2001	Physics
Klaus von Klitzing	Germany	1985	Physics
Brian Kobilka	United States	2012	Chemistry
Roger D. Kornberg	United States	2006	Chemistry
J. Michael Kosterlitz	United Kingdom / United States	2016	Physics
Finn E. Kydland	Norway	2004	Economics
The 14th Dalai Lama	Tibet (in exile) / India	1989	Peace
Yuan T. Lee	Taiwan	1986	Chemistry
Robert Lefkowitz	United States	2012	Chemistry
Anthony James Leggett	United Kingdom / United States	2003	Physics
Jean-Marie Lehn	France	1987	Chemistry
Michael Levitt	United Kingdom / South Africa	2013	Chemistry
Tomas Lindahl	United Kingdom / Sweden	2015	Chemistry
Benjamin List	Germany	2021	Chemistry
Roderick MacKinnon	United States	2003	Chemistry
David MacMillan	United Kingdom / United States	2021	Chemistry
Barry Marshall	Australia	2005	Medicine
Eric Maskin	United States	2007	Economics
John C. Mather	United States	2006	Physics
Michel Mayor	Switzerland	2019	Physics
Arthur B. McDonald	Canada	2015	Physics
Daniel McFadden	United States	2000	Economics
Craig Mello	United States	2006	Medicine
Robert C. Merton	United States	1997	Economics
Hartmut Michel	Germany	1988	Chemistry
Paul Milgrom	United States	2020	Economics
Paul L. Modrich	United States	2015	Chemistry
William E. Moerner	United States	2014	Chemistry
Edvard Moser	Norway	2014	Medicine
May-Britt Moser	Norway	2014	Medicine
Gérard Mourou	France	2018	Physics
Herta Müller	Romania / Germany	2009	Literature
Ferid Murad	United States	1998	Medicine
Roger Myerson	United States	2007	Economics
Erwin Neher	Germany	1991	Medicine
Ryoji Noyori	Japan	2001	Chemistry
Paul Nurse	United Kingdom	2001	Medicine
Christiane Nüsslein-Volhard	Germany	1995	Medicine
Barack Obama	United States	2009	Peace
John O'Keefe	United Kingdom / United States	2014	Medicine
Yoshinori Ohsumi	Japan	2016	Medicine
Orhan Pamuk	Turkey	2006	Literature
Ardem Patapoutian	Lebanon / United States	2021	Medicine
Jim Peebles	Canada / United States	2019	Physics
Edmund Phelps	United States	2006	Economics
William Daniel Phillips	United States	1997	Physics
Hugh David Politzer	United States	2004	Physics
Stanley B. Prusiner	United States	1997	Medicine
Venkatraman Ramakrishnan	United Kingdom / India	2009	Chemistry
Peter J. Ratcliffe	United Kingdom	2019	Medicine
Maria Ressa	Philippines / United States	2021	Peace
Charles M. Rice	United States	2020	Medicine
Adam Riess	United States	2011	Physics
Richard J. Roberts	United Kingdom	1993	Medicine
Michael Rosbash	United States	2017	Medicine
Alvin E. Roth	United States	2012	Economics
James Rothman	United States	2013	Medicine
Bert Sakmann	Germany	1991	Medicine
Juan Manuel Santos	Colombia	2016	Peace
Kailash Satyarthi	India	2014	Peace
Jean-Pierre Sauvage	France	2016	Chemistry
Randy Schekman	United States	2013	Medicine
Brian Schmidt	United States / Australia	2011	Physics
Gregg L. Semenza	United States	2019	Medicine
Phillip Allen Sharp	United States	1993	Medicine
Karl Barry Sharpless	United States	2001	Chemistry
Dan Shechtman	Israel	2011	Chemistry
Robert J. Shiller	United States	2013	Economics
Hideki Shirakawa	Japan	2000	Chemistry
Hamilton O. Smith	United States	1978	Medicine
Wole Soyinka	Nigeria	1986	Literature
Fraser Stoddart	United Kingdom / United States	2016	Chemistry
Horst Ludwig Störmer	Germany / United States	1998	Physics
Donna Strickland	Canada	2018	Physics
Jack W. Szostak	United Kingdom / Canada	2009	Medicine
Joseph Hooton Taylor Jr.	United States	1993	Physics
Kip Thorne	United States	2017	Physics
Susumu Tonegawa	Japan	1987	Medicine
Daniel C. Tsui	China / United States	1998	Physics
Harold E. Varmus	United States	1989	Medicine
John E. Walker	United Kingdom	1997	Chemistry
Arieh Warshel	Israel / United States	2013	Chemistry
Rainer Weiss	Germany / United States	2017	Physics
M. Stanley Whittingham	United Kingdom / United States	2019	Chemistry
Eric F. Wieschaus	United States	1995	Medicine
Torsten Wiesel	Sweden	1981	Medicine
Frank Wilczek	United States	2004	Physics
Jody Williams	United States	1997	Peace
David J. Wineland	United States	2012	Physics
Kurt Wüthrich	Switzerland	2002	Chemistry
Shinya Yamanaka	Japan	2012	Medicine
Michael W. Young	United States	2017	Medicine
