= Hiam (given name) =

Hiam or Hiyam (Arabic: هيام) is an Arabic feminine given name. Notable people with the name include:

== Given name ==
- Hiam Amani Hafizuddin (born 1995), American entrepreneur and beauty queen
- Hiam Abbass (born 1960), Palestinian actress and film director
- Hiyam Qablan (born 1956), Palestinian poet and short story writer
