= Hoffmann Institute of Advanced Materials =

Research institute in Shenzhen, China

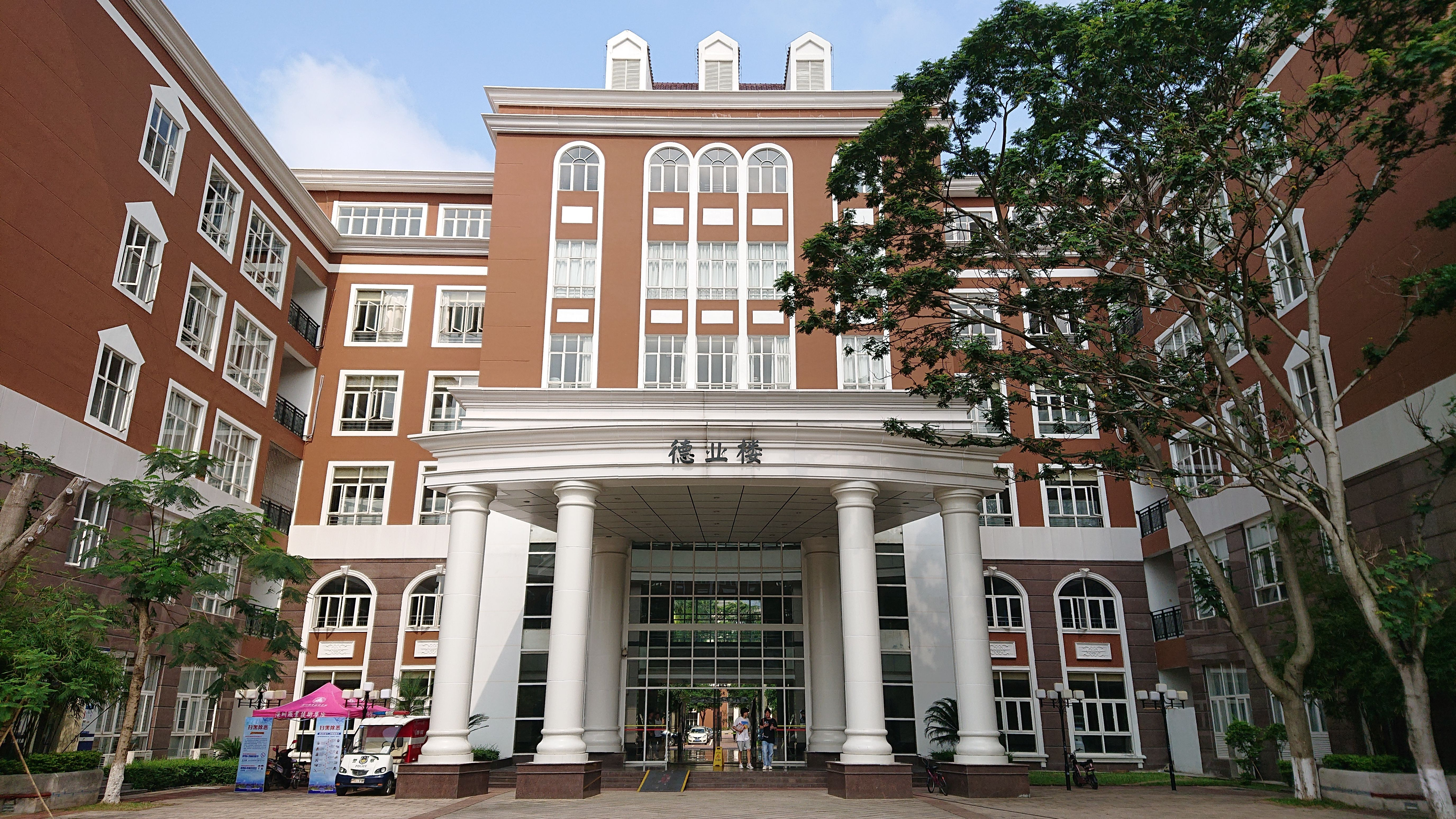
Hoffmann Institute of Advanced Materials, outside view

The Hoffmann Institute of Advanced Materials (HIAM) is a science research institute affiliated to Shenzhen Polytechnic in Shenzhen, China. As the eighth institute at Shenzhen named after a Nobel laureate, it was founded in February 2018 under the tutelage of the theoretical chemist Roald Hoffmann. The institute was officially opened with a formal ceremony in May 2019.

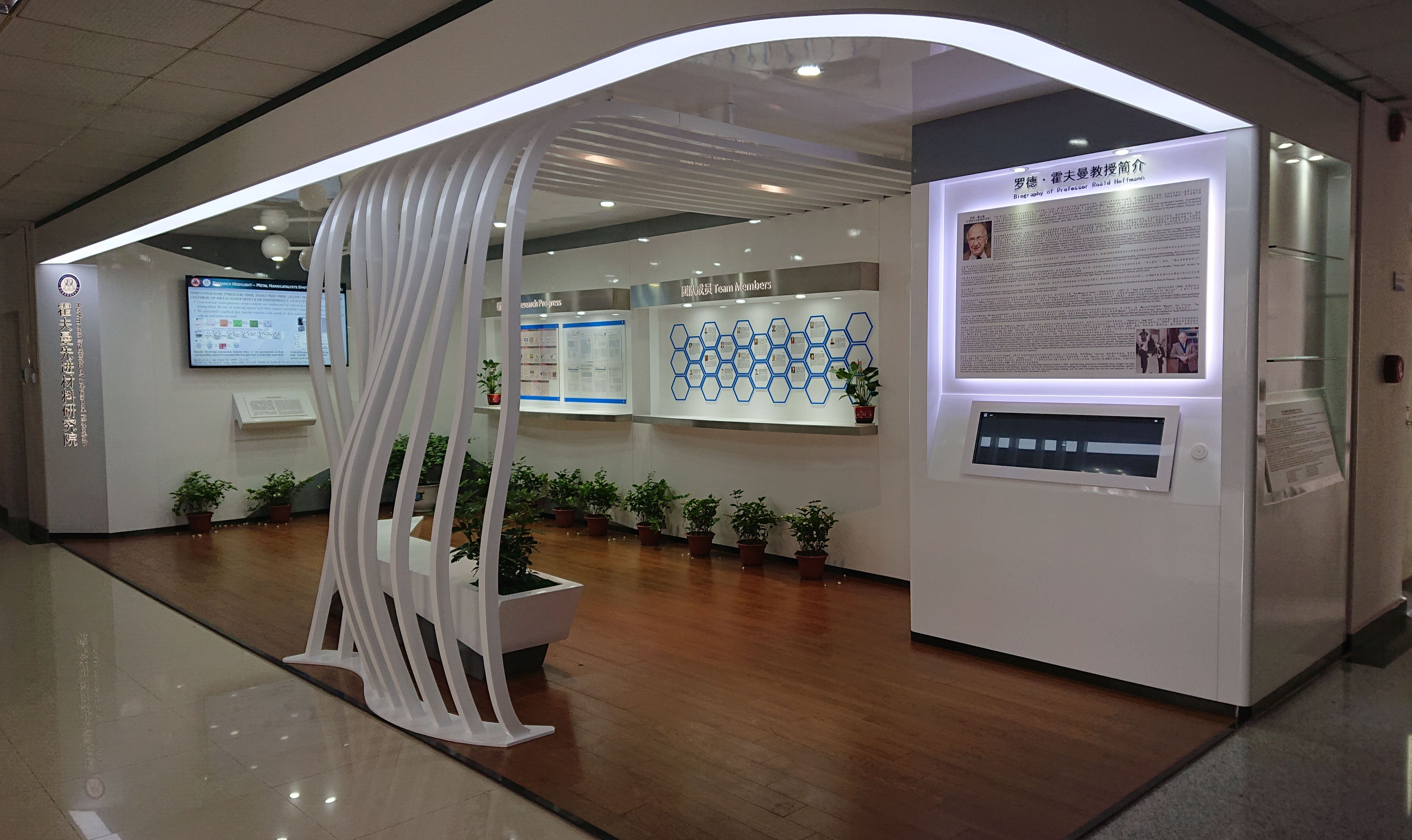
Hoffmann Institute of Advanced Materials, entrance area

Its research topics cover novel functional materials, with an emphasis on their properties and applications in new energy and renewable energy fields. The institute's key research areas are photo-electric materials, energy-storage materials, and energy-efficient materials. The institute consists of three departments: a computational laboratory, a materials research laboratory, and a device commercialization laboratory.

The institute holds strong ties with other international laboratories dealing with energy-related research, including those from Kyoto and Osaka (Japan), Aachen and Düsseldorf (Germany), NIST (U.S.), and Skoltech (Russia). Likewise, the institute collaborates in regard to the chemistry, physics, and materials science of complex mixed-anion inorganic compounds with universities and research institutions in Kyoto (Japan), Oxford (UK), Antwerp (Belgium), and Bordeaux (France).

== Advisory board ==
The institute is supported by a high-level advisory board, which currently includes Lin Jianhua, Francis J. DiSalvo, Galen Stucky, Maochun Hong, Xiaoming Chen, Robert Cava, and Markus Antonietti.

== Research accomplishments ==
Recent characteristic research with the institute as first affiliation has been dealing with the encapsulation of multiple dyes into nanocrystalline metal-organic frameworks for energy-efficient lighting devices, the clarification of the real-time formation mechanism of quantum wells for stable and efficient perovskite photovoltaics, the encapsulation of a porous organic cage into the pores of a metal-organic framework for enhanced CO_{2} separation, the design of metal-organic frameworks for alkane separation and adsorption of noble gases such as xenon, the synthesis of a chemically stable cucurbit[6]uril-based hydrogen-bonded organic framework for SO_{2}/CO_{2} separation, the first-principles prediction of nitrogen-based transition-metal guanidinates TCN_{3} and ortho-nitrido carbonates T_{2}CN_{4} for photoelectrochemistry, the mechanochemical one-pot fabrication of a monolithic cucurbituril−encapsulating metal−organic framework from a flowing gel, and the prediction of BeCN_{2} as the lightest representative of II–IV–V_{2} compounds.

By the end of 2021, the institute had published several key papers in outstanding international journals such as the Journal of the American Chemical Society. Based on this achievement, the Shenzhen Polytechnic already made it into the top 200 Chinese institutions within Nature's publication index.
