= List of chairs of the Democratic National Committee =

List of U.S. political party chairs

Chair of the Democratic National Committee

- Incumbent; Ken Martin since February 1, 2025
- Appointer: Democratic National Committee
- Term length: 4 years; renewable
- Inaugural holder: Benjamin F. Hallett
- Formation: 1848 (177 years ago)
- Website: Official website

The chair of the Democratic National Committee is the party chair of the Democratic Party.

The chair manages the day-to-day affairs and operations of the Democratic National Committee (DNC), prepares and conducts the quadrennial Democratic National Convention, and promotes the Democratic "party brand" and political platform, as well as assists in party fundraising and election strategy. The DNC chair also serves as a superdelegate to the Democratic National Convention and can affect the outcome over a close primary race only if no candidate receives a majority of pledged delegates.

The current officeholder is Ken Martin of Minnesota, who took office on February 1, 2025.

== Chairs of the Democratic National Committee ==
Denotes acting capacity.

List of Democratic National Committee chairs
Name	Start	End	State
Benjamin Hallett	1848	1852	Massachusetts
Robert McLane	1852	1856	Maryland
David Smalley	1856	June 23, 1860	Vermont
August Belmont	June 23, 1860	1872	New York
Augustus Schell	1872	1876	New York
Abram Hewitt	1876	March 4, 1877	New York
William Barnum	March 4, 1877	April 30, 1889	Connecticut
Calvin Brice	April 30, 1889	1892	Ohio
William Harrity	1892	1896	Pennsylvania
James Jones	1896	1904	Arkansas
Thomas Taggart	1904	1908	Indiana
Norman Mack	1908	July 15, 1912	New York
William McCombs	July 15, 1912	June 15, 1916	New York
Vance McCormick	June 15, 1916	January 15, 1919	Pennsylvania
Homer Cummings	February 27, 1919	July 28, 1920	Connecticut
George White	July 28, 1920	November 2, 1921	Ohio
Cordell Hull	November 2, 1921	July 22, 1924	Tennessee
Clem Shaver	July 22, 1924	July 11, 1928	West Virginia
John Raskob	July 11, 1928	July 2, 1932	New York
James Farley	July 2, 1932	August 17, 1940	New York
Edward Flynn	August 17, 1940	January 18, 1943	New York
Frank Walker	January 18, 1943	January 23, 1944	Pennsylvania
Robert Hannegan	January 23, 1944	October 29, 1947	Missouri
Howard McGrath	October 29, 1947	August 24, 1949	Rhode Island
William Boyle	August 24, 1949	October 31, 1951	Missouri
Frank McKinney	October 31, 1951	August 9, 1952	Indiana
Stephen Mitchell	August 9, 1952	January 1, 1955	Illinois
Paul Butler	January 1, 1955	July 17, 1960	Indiana
Scoop Jackson	July 17, 1960	January 21, 1961	Washington
John Bailey	January 21, 1961	August 30, 1968	Connecticut
Larry O'Brien	August 30, 1968	January 14, 1969	Massachusetts
Fred Harris	January 14, 1969	March 5, 1970	Oklahoma
Larry O'Brien	March 5, 1970	July 14, 1972	Massachusetts
Jean Westwood	July 14, 1972	December 9, 1972	Utah
Bob Strauss	December 9, 1972	January 21, 1977	Texas
Kenneth Curtis	January 21, 1977	January 27, 1978	Maine
John White	January 27, 1978	February 27, 1981	Texas
Charles Manatt	February 27, 1981	February 1, 1985	California
Paul Kirk	February 1, 1985	February 10, 1989	Massachusetts
Ron Brown	February 10, 1989	January 21, 1993	New York
David Wilhelm	January 21, 1993	November 11, 1994	Ohio
Debra DeLee	November 11, 1994	January 21, 1995	Massachusetts
Chris Dodd; General Chair	January 21, 1995	January 21, 1997	Connecticut
Don Fowler; National Chair	January 21, 1995	January 21, 1997	South Carolina
Roy Romer; General Chair	January 21, 1997	September 25, 1999	Colorado
Steve Grossman; National Chair	January 21, 1997	January 22, 1999	Massachusetts
Ed Rendell; General Chair	September 25, 1999	February 3, 2001	Pennsylvania
Joe Andrew; National Chair	January 22, 1999	January 21, 2001	Indiana
Terry McAuliffe	February 3, 2001	February 12, 2005	Virginia
Howard Dean	February 12, 2005	January 21, 2009	Vermont
Tim Kaine	January 21, 2009	April 5, 2011	Virginia
Donna Brazile; Acting	April 5, 2011	May 4, 2011	Louisiana
Debbie Wasserman Schultz	May 4, 2011	July 28, 2016	Florida
Donna Brazile; Acting	July 28, 2016	February 25, 2017	Louisiana
Tom Perez	February 25, 2017	January 21, 2021	Maryland
Jaime Harrison	January 21, 2021	February 1, 2025	South Carolina
Ken Martin	February 1, 2025	present	Minnesota

== See also ==
- Democratic National Committee
- Democratic National Convention
- History of the Democratic Party (United States)
- List of chairs of the Republican National Committee
