= Zerner =

Zerner is a surname. Notable people with the surname include:

- Larry Zerner (born 1963), American lawyer and actor
- Michael Zerner (1940–2000), American theoretical chemist and professor
- William Zerner (1882–1963), Australian school principal and schoolteacher

== See also ==
- Zürner
