= Loren Williams =

American biophysicist, biochemist and astrobiologist

Loren Dean Williams
- Born: Seattle, Washington
- Education: University of Washington, Duke University
- Scientific career
- Fields: Biophysics, biochemistry, astrobiology
- Workplaces: Georgia Institute of Technology
- Doctoral advisor: Barbara Ramsay Shaw
- Website: https://ww2.chemistry.gatech.edu/~lw26/

Loren Dean Williams is a biophysicist, biochemist, astrobiologist, and professor in the School of Chemistry and Biochemistry at the Georgia Institute of Technology in Atlanta, Georgia. His research seeks to understand the structural basis for macromolecular reactions, from the role of nucleic acids as targets of chemotherapeutics to the ancestral biochemistry of the ribosome during the origin of life.

== Biography ==
Williams was born in Seattle, Washington, and raised in Seattle, Corvallis, Oregon, and Winnipeg, Manitoba. His maternal grandmother was Alice Franklin Bryant, Seattle peace activist, political candidate, and author. His mother, Imogene Bryant Williams, was a teacher and activist for environmental protection and labor rights. His father, Harvey Dean Williams, was a professor of science education and an environmentalist. Williams lives in Atlanta, Georgia with his wife Nidhi Williams. Their son, Justin Williams, is a PhD candidate in Molecular and Cell Biology at UC Berkeley.

=== Scientific training ===
As a chemistry undergraduate at University of Washington, Williams worked on porphyrin chemistry in the laboratory of Martin Gouterman and was a sprinter on the varsity track team. As a PhD student in physical chemistry at Duke University in the laboratory of Barbara Ramsay Shaw, he studied the mechanisms of base pairing of cytosine and guanine. He was an American Cancer Society Postdoctoral Fellow at Harvard Medical School in the laboratory of Irving Goldberg. He then joined the laboratory of Alexander Rich at MIT as a NIH Postdoctoral Fellow, where he specialized in DNA intercalation and structural characterization of interactions between anti-cancer drugs and DNA.

=== Georgia Tech ===
Williams joined the chemistry faculty at the Georgia Institute of Technology in 1992 and received a NSF CAREER Award in 1995. At Georgia Tech, Williams has mentored 25 PhD students and received numerous awards for excellence in mentorship, teaching, outreach, and advocating for improved accessibility. From 2008 to 2015, he served as the director of the RiboEvo Center at Georgia Tech, part of the NASA Astrobiology Institute. He is currently director of the NASA-funded Center for the Origin of Life (COOL) at Georgia Tech and a Co-Lead of the Prebiotic Chemistry and Early Earth Environment Consortium (PCE_{3} a NASA Research Coordination Network). In 2021, he was elected Fellow of the International Society for the Study of the Origin of Life (ISSOL).

== Research ==
=== “A Rash Investigator”: Cation interactions with DNA ===
At Georgia Tech, Williams' research group began studying the structural basis for interactions between DNA and cations. Williams and his students developed a model in which cations such as sodium and magnesium interact directly with DNA and influence DNA conformation through electrostatic interactions. This model challenged Richard Dickerson's long-standing non-electrostatic DNA conformation model by suggesting that the peaks of electron density near DNA were cations instead of waters; in response, Dickerson termed Williams a “rash investigator”. Subsequent studies have confirmed the direct role of cations in nucleic acid chemistry.

=== Origins of life and ancestral biochemistry ===
==== Evolution of the ribosome ====
Since 2008, Williams' research group has focused on understanding the extant ribosome across the tree of life and constructing models of ancestral ribosomes by combining biophysical chemistry, molecular biology and bioinformatics. Information found in ribosomes from all three domain of life has allowed his laboratory to construct reaction coordinates for biopolymer evolution and the evolution of the ribosome.

==== Iron as an ancient cofactor ====
Williams and his group members have shown that under conditions of the ancient Earth, i.e., in the presence of ferrous iron and the absence of molecular oxygen, RNA has catalytic power that it lacks on the modern Earth. In collaboration with Jennifer Glass, they have shown that ferrous iron is an effective cofactor for the ribosome and other nucleic acid processing enzymes.

==== Chemical evolution and mutualism ====
Williams seeks to apply biological principles to chemical sciences. In Williams’ formalism, RNA and protein are molecular symbionts and a cell is a consortium of molecules in mutualism relationships.

==== Water and ancestral biochemistry ====
In collaboration with Moran Frenkel-Pinter, Williams and coauthors showed that 40% of 6,500 known biochemical reactions either make or destroy water, suggesting that water may have been involved in selecting the earliest biomolecules for life.
