= Barbara Shaw =

Barbara Shaw may refer to:

- Barbara Ramsay Shaw, professor of chemistry
- Barbara Shaw (politician), American politician from New Hampshire
