= 1958 United States Senate election in Washington =

- November 4, 1958
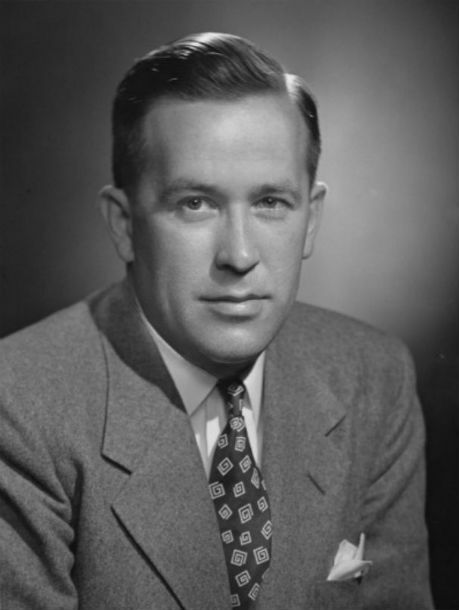

Nominee	Henry M. Jackson	William B. Bantz
Party	Democratic	Republican
Popular vote	597,040	278,271
Percentage	67.32%	31.38%
- County results Jackson: 50–60% 60–70% 70–80% 80–90%
U.S. senator before election
Henry M. Jackson
Democratic
Elected U.S. Senator
Henry M. Jackson
Democratic

The 1958 United States Senate election in Washington was held on November 4, 1958. Incumbent Democrat Henry M. Jackson won a second term in office over Republican William Bantz.

== Blanket primary ==
=== Candidates ===
==== Democratic ====
- Alice Franklin Bryant
- Henry M. Jackson, incumbent United States Senator since 1953

==== Republican ====
- William B. Bantz

=== Results ===
1958 U.S. Senate primary election in Washington
Party	Candidate	Votes	%
Democratic	Henry M. Jackson (incumbent)	334,862	59.61%
Republican	William B. Bantz	143,110	26.84%
Democratic	Alice Franklin Bryant	55,200	10.35%
Total votes		533,172	100.00%

== General election ==
=== Results ===
1958 U.S. Senate election in Washington
Party	Candidate	Votes	%	±%
Democratic	Henry M. Jackson (incumbent)	597,040	67.32%	▲11.09
Republican	William B. Bantz	278,271	31.38%	▼12.15
Socialist Labor	Henry M. Killman	7,592	0.86%	▲0.80
Constitution	Archie G. Isdo	2,257	0.26%	N/A
ULS	Jay G. Sykes	1,662	0.19%	N/A
Total votes		886,822	100.00%	
Democratic hold		Swing		

== See also ==
- 1958 United States Senate elections
