= Geerd Diercksen =

German theoretical chemist (born 1936)

Geerd HF Diercksen
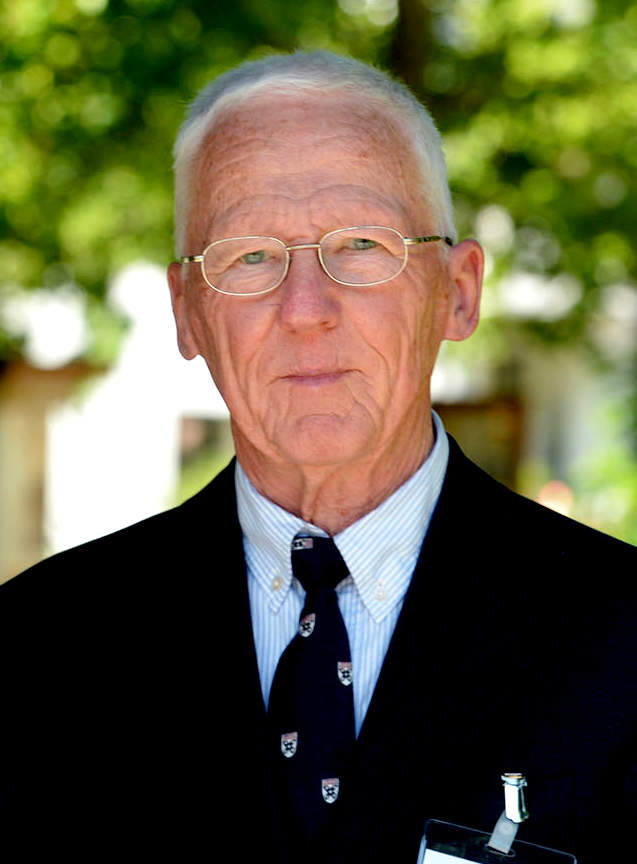
- Geerd HF Diercksen (2013) ©Humboldt-Stiftung/David Ausserhofer
- Born: 25 March 1936 (age 90); Hannover, Germany
- Education: Gottfried Wilhelm Leibniz Universität Hannover, Germany
- Scientific career
- Fields: Theoretical Chemistry
- Workplaces: Max-Planck-Institut für Astrophysik, Garching bei München, Germany
- Thesis: Beiträge zur Erweiterung der Hückel’schen Theorie der π-Elektronensysteme (1963)
- Doctoral advisor: Heinz-Werner Preuß
- Website: www.mpa-garching.mpg.de/person/44078/136550

Geerd Heinrich Friedrich Diercksen (25 March 1936 in Hannover) is a German theoretical chemist and a pioneer in computational chemistry. In 1963, he was awarded his PhD, supervised by Heinz-Werner Preuß at the Johann Wolfgang Goethe-Universität in Frankfurt am Main, in 1973 he was awarded his habilitation in Chemistry by the Technical University of Munich and in 1983 he was appointed professor (apl. Professor). From 1965 to 2001 he worked as scientific staff at the Max-Planck-Institut für Astrophysik and since 2001 he works there as scientist emeritus.

== Education ==
Geerd Diercksen graduated (Abitur) in spring 1956 at the Luther-Schule in Hannover. Directly afterwards he started to study chemistry, mathematics and physics at the Technische Hochschule Hannover (since 2006: Gottfried Wilhelm Leibniz Universität Hannover) and graduated in autumn 1961 in chemistry (Diplom Chemiker). His interest in Theoretical and Computational Chemistry was raised during a course held by Werner Fischer and firmly established by attending a Summer School organised by Per-Olov Löwdin in 1960 at Uppsala University.

After graduation in Hannover he started his PhD studies supervised by Heinz-Werner Preuß at the Johann Wolfgang Goethe-Universität, Frankfurt am Main, and in autumn 1963 he was awarded his PhD (Dr. phil. nat). Directly afterwards he started post-doctoral work at Keele University supervised by Roy McWeeny. In spring 1965 he accepted an offer by Ludwig Biermann to join the Max-Planck-Institut für Physik und Astrophysik in Munich (since 1991: Max-Planck-Institut für Astrophysik in Garching) as Scientific Staff. In 1973, he was awarded Habilitation in Chemistry by the Technical University of Munich and in 1983 he was appointed there Professor (apl. Professor). Since his retirement in 2001 he is working at the MPA as Scientist emeritus.

== Biography ==
At the Max-Planck-Institute Diercksen established a worldwide network of scientific cooperations. In particular, he provided many colleagues from Eastern Europe with the opportunity to work as guest researchers at the Max-Planck-Institute and to establish contact with colleagues from Western Europe, the Americas and Asia. He hosted nine Humboldt Research Fellows. With one of them, Tokuei Sako (Nihon University, Campus Funabashi, Chiba), he was connected for many years after his retirement by a close, successful cooperation. In addition, he hosted five Humboldt Research Award Winners: Włodzimierz Kołos (University of Warsaw), Turgay Uzer (Georgia Institute of Technology), Michael Zerner (University of Florida, Gainesville, FL.), Josef Paldus (University of Waterloo, ONT) and Enrico Clementi (Como).

As visiting scientist he has spent one year each at the IBM Research Laboratories in San Jose, California, and at the Harvard College Observatory in Cambridge, Massachusetts, and six months at the Hokkaido University in Sapporo. As Research Award Winner of five partner organisations of the Alexander von Humboldt-Foundation, he has spent one year each at the University of Waterloo and at Queen's University in Kingston, Ontario, at the University of São Paulo (USP), and six months at the University of Tokyo. Within the framework of his scientific cooperations he has visited repeatedly up to several month partner institutions, among others in Brasil, Chile, Canada, Great Britain, India, Japan, Poland, Sweden, the Slovak Republic, Venezuela, Uruguay and the USA. In 1969, he started, jointly with Alain Veillard (University of Strasbourg), the tri-annual Series of European Seminars on Computational Methods in Quantum Chemistry.

From 1985 to 2000 Diercksen served as editor of Computer Physics Communications, from 2002 to 2009 as German Representative in the COST Technical Committee: Telecommunication, Information Science and Technology, from 2001 to 2005 as chairman of the Management Committee of the ICT COST Action 282 Knowledge Exploration in Science and Technology, and from 2002 to 2004 as Scientific Advisor of the Project IST-2001-37238 Open Computing GRID for Molecular Science and Engineering within the 5th EU Framework Programme

Diercksen is Member of the Deutsche Gesellschaft der Humboldtianer e.V. (Humboldt-Club) and of the Deutsche Gesellschaft der JSPS-Stipendiaten e.V. (JSPS-Club).

== Research areas ==
The research activities of Geerd Diercksen have been focused on the development and implementation of ab-initio methods and their application to the accurate and reliable calculation of the properties of few electron systems. The implemented methods include, among others, the Hartree-Fock method and a Configuration Interaction method based on the symmetric group (jointly with Włodzisław Duch und Jacek Karwowski, Nicolaus Copernicus University in Torun). In his studies he used as well the Coupled Cluster and the Polarization Propagator methods. The list of his wide scientific interests has to be limited here to a few examples: Early investigations have addressed hydrogen bonding. The results have been summarized in his Habilitation Thesis (Habilitationsschrift). He has created the first video (1968) of the electron distribution change in the hydrogen bond formation of the water dimer. Jointly with Wolfgang Kraemer (MPA) and Björn Roos (Lund University) he was the first to calculate the electron correlation energy of the hydrogen bond in the water dimer. Further subjects he has studied include ionisation potentials and photoelectron spectra of atoms and molecules (jointly with Wolfgang von Niessen, Braunschweig University of Technology, Lorenz S. Cederbaum, Heidelberg University, and his graduate student Florian Müller-Plathe), electric moments and polarizabilities (with Ivan Černušák, Vladimir Kellö, Mirowslav Urban, Comenius University in Bratislava and Andrzej Sadlej, Nicolaus Copernicus University in Torun) and impact cross section of molecules (with Gerd Billing, University of Copenhagen, and Reinhard Schinke, Max-Planck-Institut für Dynamik und Selbstorganisation). The study of impact cross sections has required the time-consuming calculation of potential energy hypersurfaces most often sampling more than 100 points of support. Some of these potential hypersurfaces have served many years as standard test case for new methods for the calculation of impact cross sections. His late work has focused on studying quantum systems in non-coulomb potentials, among others on the origin of the first Hund's rule in atoms and quantum dots (jointly with Tokuei Sako). Parallel to his quantum chemical studies he has been interested in the design of intelligent software. Within this framework he has studied artificial neural networks (jointly with Włodzisław Duch) and initiated the two projects mentioned above: Knowledge Exploration in Science and Technology and Open Computing GRID for Molecular Science and Engineering.

== Awards ==
Geerd Diercksen has received the Gold Medal of the Faculty of Mathematics and Physics, Comenius University, Bratislava, Slovakia and was Research Award Winner of 5 partner organisations of the Alexander von Humboldt-Foundation (University of São Paulo (USP), Brasilien, University of Waterloo und Queen's University, Kingston, Kanada, Indien, Polen and University of Tokyo, Japan).

== Publications ==
His research results have been documented in about 250 publications in refereed scientific journals. He has served as editor of the proceedings of 5 NATO Advanced Study Institutes.

== Literature ==
- Kürschners Deutscher Gelehrten-Kalender 2017: [Print + Online], 29. Auflage, De Gruyter 2016, ISBN 3-11-045398-3, ISBN 978-3-11-045398-0
- Karl Jug, Zweihundert Jahre Entwicklung der Theoretischen Chemie im deutschsprachigen Raum, Springer Spektrum 2015, S. 90, ISBN 3-662-43364-8, ISBN 978-3-662-43364-5
