= 1976 United States Senate election in Washington =

- November 2, 1976
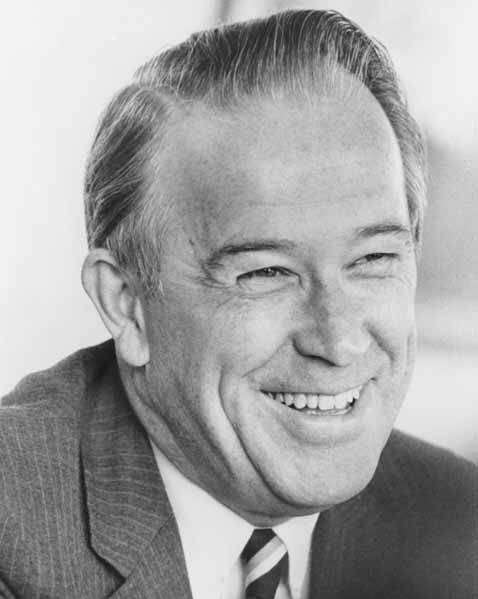

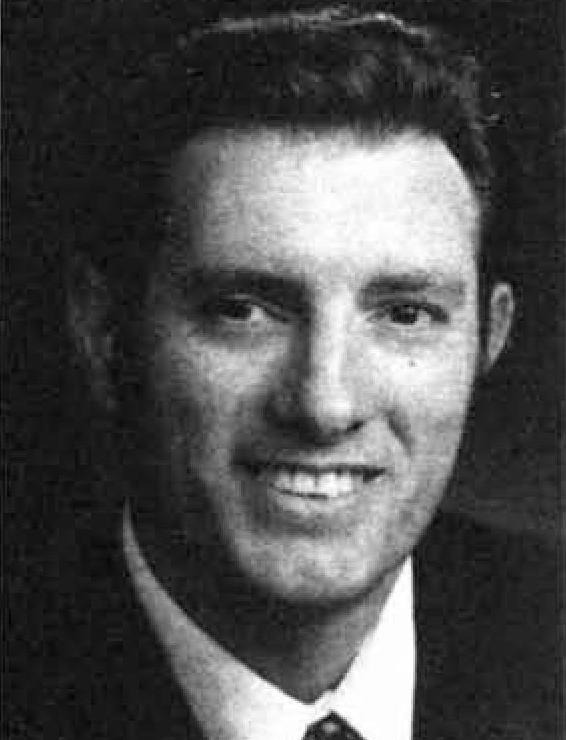
Nominee	Henry M. Jackson	George M. Brown
Party	Democratic	Republican
Popular vote	1,071,219	361,546
Percentage	71.84%	24.25%
- County results Jackson: 40–50% 50–60% 60–70% 70–80%
U.S. senator before election
Henry M. Jackson
Democratic
Elected U.S. Senator
Henry M. Jackson
Democratic

The 1976 United States Senate election in Washington was held on November 2, 1976. Incumbent Democrat Henry M. Jackson, who had been a candidate for President earlier that year, won a fifth term in office with a landslide victory over Republican George Brown even as incumbent President Gerald Ford won the state for President on the same ballot.

== Blanket primary ==
=== Candidates ===
==== Democratic ====
- Paul Gumbell
- Henry M. Jackson, incumbent United States Senator
- Dennis "Hitch Hiker" Kelley

==== Republican ====
- George M. Brown
- William H. Davis, candidate for U.S. Senate in 1970
- Warren E. Hanson, fisherman
- Henry C. Nielsen
- Wilbur R. Parkin, candidate for U.S. Representative in 1952 and 1954
- Clarice L.R. "Tops" Privette, perennial candidate from Spokane

=== Results ===
Results by county Jackson: 50–60%; 60–70%; 70–80%; 80–90%

1976 United States Senate primary election in Washington
Party	Candidate	Votes	%
Democratic	Henry M. Jackson (incumbent)	549,974	68.33%
Democratic	Dennis Kelley	54,470	6.77%
Republican	George M. Brown	51,885	6.45%
Republican	Warren E. Hanson	43,905	5.46%
Republican	Henry C. Nielsen	28,030	3.48%
Democratic	Paul Gumbell	24,559	3.05%
Republican	Wilbur R. Parkin	21,639	2.69%
Republican	William H. Davis	16,881	2.10%
Republican	Clarice L.R. Privette	13,526	1.68%
Total votes		804,869	100.00%

== General election ==
=== Results ===
1976 United States Senate election in Washington
Party	Candidate	Votes	%	±%
Democratic	Henry M. Jackson (incumbent)	1,071,219	71.84%	▼10.59
Republican	George M. Brown	361,546	24.25%	▲8.24
American Independent	Dave Smith	28,182	1.89%	N/A
Libertarian	Richard K. Kenney	19,373	1.30%	N/A
Socialist Workers	Karl Bermann	7,402	0.50%	▼0.37
U.S. Labor	William F. Wertz	3,389	0.23%	N/A
Total votes		1,491,111	100.00%	
Democratic hold		Swing		

== See also ==
- 1976 United States Senate elections
