= 1960 Illinois gubernatorial election =

- November 8, 1960
- Turnout: 84.99% ▲2.30 pp
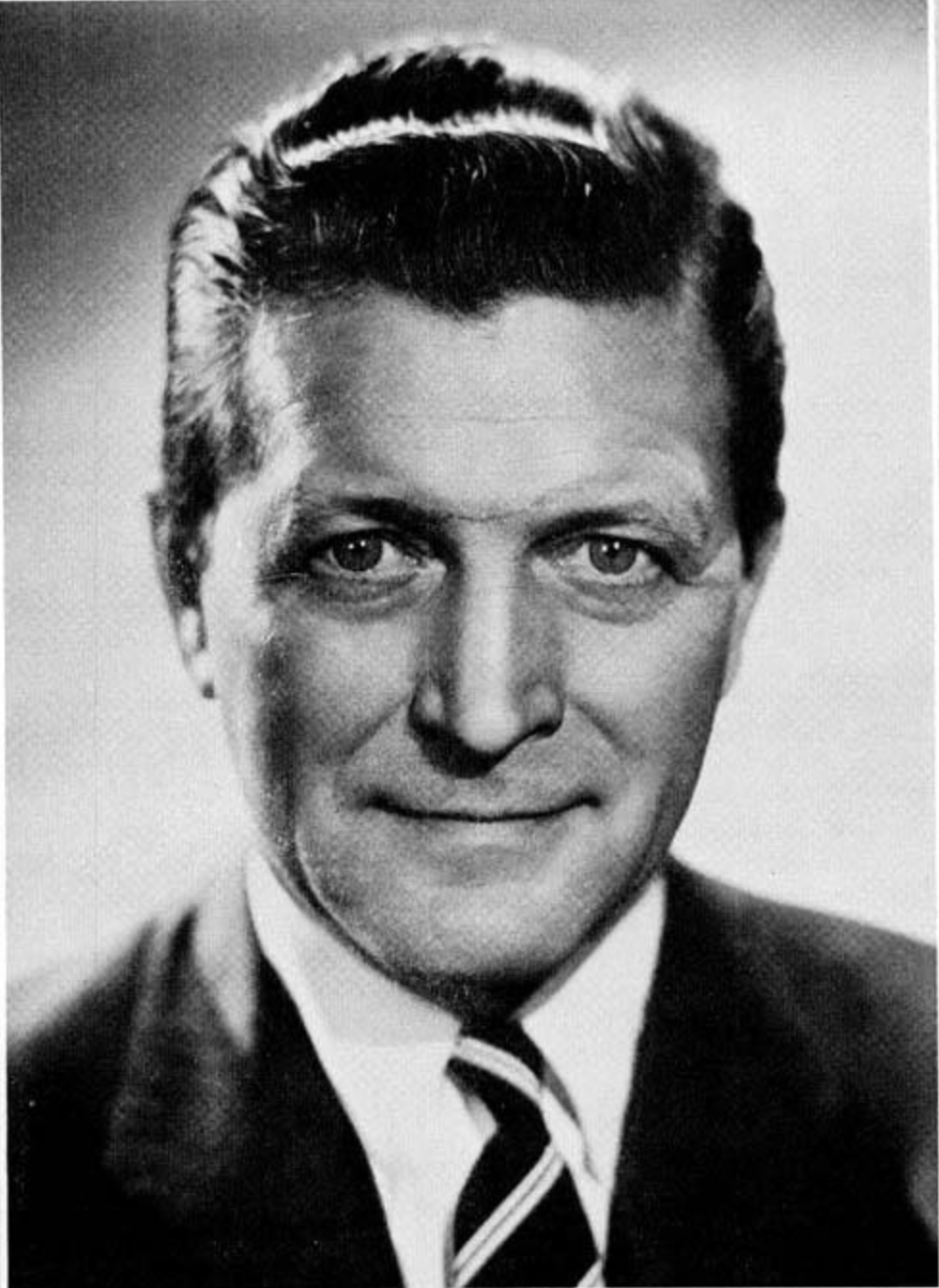

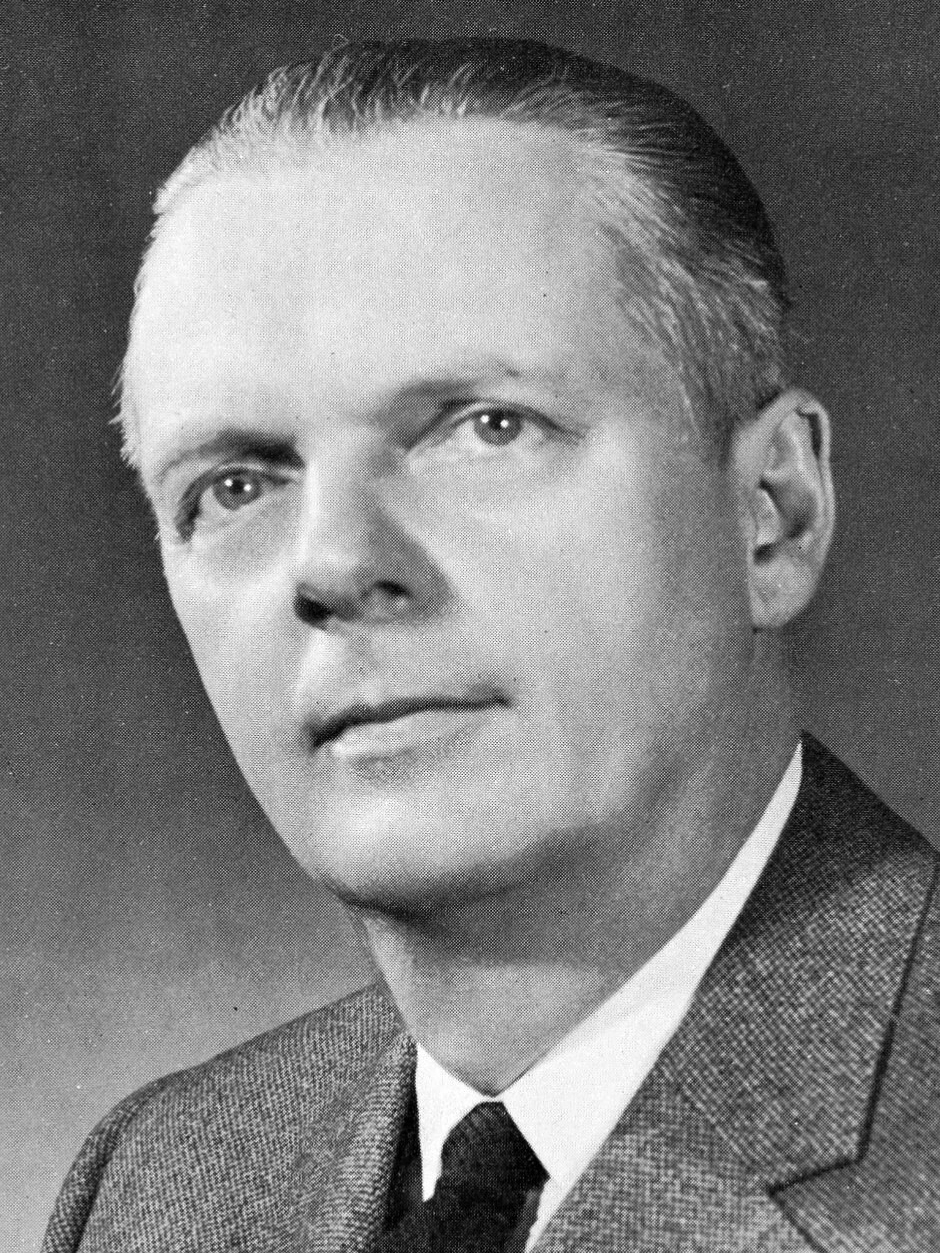
Nominee	Otto Kerner Jr.	William Stratton
Party	Democratic	Republican
Popular vote	2,594,731	2,070,479
Percentage	55.51%	44.30%
- County results Kerner: 50–60% 60–70% Stratton: 50–60% 60–70%
Governor before election
William Stratton
Republican
Elected Governor
Otto Kerner Jr.
Democratic

The 1960 Illinois gubernatorial election was held in Illinois on November 8, 1960.

Heading into this election, Stratton was seen as vulnerable to being unseated if the Democrats ran a strong candidate, as he had only narrowly won reelection in 1956 (despite a strong overall performance by the Republican party in the state that year), and since the Democratic Party had nationally had a strong performance in the 1958 elections. Incumbent Governor William Stratton, a Republican seeking a third term, lost reelection to Democrat Otto Kerner Jr.

== Background ==
The primaries and general election both coincided with those for federal offices (United States President, House, and United States Senate) and those for other state offices. The election was part of the 1960 Illinois elections.

In the primaries, turnout was 37.54%, with 1,910,956 votes cast. In the general election, turnout was 84.99%, with 4,674,187 votes cast.

== Primaries ==
Primaries were held on April 12, 1960.

=== Democratic primary ===
Names floated as potential Democratic contenders included former Illinois Governor John Stelle, former Illinois Attorney General John Edward Cassidy, former United States Senator Scott W. Lucas, President of the Chicago Board of Education Sargent Shriver, and Chicago mayor Richard J. Daley, all of whom opted not to run. Daley, the head of the Cook County Democratic Party and a political boss, helped slate Otto Kerner for the nomination. Kerner won the Democratic primary.

==== Candidates ====
===== Ran =====
- Otto Kerner Jr., judge of the Illinois Circuit Court of Cook County
- Joseph D. Lohman, treasurer of Illinois and former Cook County sheriff
- Stephen A. Mitchell, former chairman of the Democratic National Committee

===== Declined to run =====
- John Edward Cassidy, former Illinois attorney general
- Richard J. Daley, mayor of Chicago and chairman of the Cook County Democratic Party
- John Gleason, vice president of First National Bank of Chicago and former national commander of the American Legion
- Scott W. Lucas, former United States senator
- James L. O'Keefe, 1956 Democratic nominee for Illinois attorney general
- Paul Powell, speaker of the Illinois House of Representatives
- Sargent Shriver, President of the Chicago Board of Education
- John Stelle, former governor of Illinois

==== Results ====
Gubernatorial Democratic primary
Party	Candidate	Votes	%
Democratic	Otto Kerner	649,253	60.89
Democratic	Joseph D. Lohman	232,345	21.79
Democratic	Stephen A. Mitchell	184,651	17.32
Total votes		1,066,249	100

=== Republican ===
Gubernatorial Republican primary
Party	Candidate	Votes	%
Republican	William G. Stratton (incumbent)	499,365	59.12
Republican	Hayes Robertson	345,340	40.88
Write-in		2	0.00
Total votes		844,707	100

== General election ==
Gubernatorial election
Party	Candidate	Votes	%
Democratic	Otto Kerner Jr.	2,594,731	55.51
Republican	William G. Stratton (incumbent)	2,070,479	44.30
Socialist Labor	Edward C. Cross	8,976	0.19
Write-in		1	0.00
Total votes		4,674,187	100
