= Zürner =

Zürner is a German surname. Notable people with the surname include:

- Adam Friedrich Zürner (1679–1742), German cartographer and geographer
- Albert Zürner (1890–1920), German diver

== See also ==
- Turner (surname)
- Zerner
