= Bust of Henry M. Jackson =

Bust by Wendy Ross in Seattle, Washington, US

- The bust in 2024
- Artist: Wendy Ross
- Type: Sculpture
- Subject: Henry M. Jackson
- Location: Seattle, Washington, U.S.; 47°39′23″N 122°18′22″W

An outdoor bust of Senator Henry M. Jackson by Wendy Ross is installed on the University of Washington campus in Seattle, Washington's University District, in the United States. It is located outside Thomson Hall, home to the Henry M. Jackson School of International Studies, and sits opposite a bust of Norwegian composer Edvard Grieg.

== See also ==
- Campus of the University of Washington
