= Martin Gouterman =

American chemist (1931–2020)

- Born: December 26, 1931
- Died: February 22, 2020 (aged 88)
- Education: University of Chicago
- Scientific career
- Workplaces: Harvard University; University of Washington
- Thesis: Study of the effects of substitution on the absorption spectra of porphyrins (1959)
- Doctoral students: Roald Hoffmann; Janet Kavandi; Michael Zerner
- Other notable students: Loren Williams

Martin Paul Gouterman (December 26, 1931 – February 22, 2020) was an American chemist who was a professor of chemistry at the University of Washington. He is remembered for his seminal work on the optical spectra porphyrins, for which he developed a simple model generally referred to as Gouterman's four-orbital model.

== Early life and education ==
Gouterman was born on December 26, 1931 in Philadelphia and was the only child of Bernard and Melba Buxbaum Gouterman. He attended Philadelphia Central High School and graduated in 1949. Gouterman was an undergraduate student at the University of Chicago, where originally he majored in piano performance but eventually studied physics. He stayed at Chicago for his doctoral research, where he started studying porphyrins.

== Research and career ==
After graduating, Gouterman was appointed to the faculty at Harvard University where he worked as a postdoctoral researcher with William Moffitt. Shortly after Gouterman arrived, Moffitt died of a heart attack during a squash game. Gouterman was quickly promoted to assistant professor, and spent his time using quantum chemical calculations to understand the photophysical properties of porphyrins. He primarily made use of the Hückel molecular orbital method to interrogate their optical spectra. Gouterman's molecular models, which included symmetry arguments and configuration interactions, were able to predict the intensity differences between the absorption bands of porphyrins. The so-called four-orbit model incorporates two, almost degenerate highest occupied molecular orbitals and two degenerate lowest unoccupied molecular orbitals. The Soret and Q-bands that are visible in porphyrin spectra are the result of transitions from between these four orbitals.

Gouterman moved to the University of Washington in 1966, where he worked until his retirement. In Seattle, Gouterman continued to study the optical properties of porphyrins. He described how the chemical structures of porphyrins determine whether the spectral shape was 'normal', hyper- and hypso-. For example, the UV-vis absorption spectra of hyper porphyrins contain red-shifted peaks and extra bands due to ligand-to-metal charge transfer (LMCT) transitions. Amongst the complicated structures analysed by Gouterman were cytochrome P450–carbon monoxide complexes, whose electronic spectra included a split Soret band due to LMCT transitions.

== Awards and honors ==
- Elected Fellow of the American Physical Society
- University of Washington Minority Science and Engineering Program Faculty Excellence Award
- Creativity Certificate Award, Porphyrin Chemistry Community

== Selected publications ==
- Gouterman, Martin (1961-01-01). "Spectra of porphyrins". Journal of Molecular Spectroscopy. 6: 138–163. Bibcode:1961JMoSp...6..138G. doi:10.1016/0022-2852(61)90236-3. ISSN 0022-2852.
- Gouterman, Martin (1959-05-01). "Study of the Effects of Substitution on the Absorption Spectra of Porphin". The Journal of Chemical Physics. 30 (5): 1139–1161. Bibcode:1959JChPh..30.1139G. doi:10.1063/1.1730148. ISSN 0021-9606.
- Gouterman, Martin; Wagnière, Georges H.; Snyder, Lawrence C. (1963-01-01). "Spectra of porphyrins: Part II. Four orbital model". Journal of Molecular Spectroscopy. 11 (1): 108–127. Bibcode:1963JMoSp..11..108G. doi:10.1016/0022-2852(63)90011-0. ISSN 0022-2852.

== Personal life ==
Gouterman was a community organiser and activist. He campaigned to end the Vietnam War.

In his early career Gouterman was not open about his sexuality. He came out as gay at around age 35 after he moved to Seattle. There he became an activist for gay rights and co-founded the Dorian Society.

He also worked with the New Jewish Agenda and International Jewish Peace Union to promote Israeli-Palestinian peace. His efforts included participation in a group advocacy visit to the area in 2001.

In the early 1980s, Gouterman acted as a sperm donor and helped a lesbian couple have a son. Through mutual acquaintances, he discovered the identity of his son and thereafter enjoyed a close relationship with him.

In the last years of his life, Gouterman suffered from Alzheimer's disease. He died in Seattle on February 22, 2020, at the age of 88.

== See also ==
- Roald Hoffmann
