= Florian Müller-Plathe =

German theoretical chemist

Florian Müller-Plathe (born 1960 in Hamburg, West Germany) is a German theoretical chemist.

== Academic career ==
Müller-Plathe studied chemistry at LMU Munich, Germany and obtained his PhD at the Max Planck Institute for Astrophysics in Garching, Germany, under the guidance of Geerd Diercksen. He spent several years as a post-doctoral researcher at Daresbury Laboratory, UK, and at ETH Zurich, Switzerland (Swiss Federal Institute of Technology in Zurich), with Wilfred F. van Gunsteren, where he was awarded his habilitation in physical chemistry in 1994. He led a research group at the Max Planck Institute for Polymer Research, Mainz, Germany, from 1996 until 2002, when he was appointed full professor of physical chemistry at Constructor University Bremen, Germany (then: International University Bremen). In 2005, Müller-Plathe accepted a position as a full professor for theoretical physical chemistry at Technische Universität Darmstadt, from which he retired in 2026. He was vice-dean for research of the chemistry department at TU Darmstadt from 2007 to 2013. Müller-Plathe was coordinator of the Priority Programme 1369 Polymer-Solid-Contacts – Interfaces & Interphases of the Deutsche Forschungsgemeinschaft.

In 2015 and 2016, he was visiting fellow in the department of chemical and biological engineering of Princeton University, USA. He was visiting professor at University of São Paulo, Instituto de Física, Brazil from 1995 to 2000.

From 2001 to 2022, Müller-Plathe was Editor-in-Chief of Soft Materials published by Taylor & Francis.

He is co-founder and co-owner of inter Culturas, who specializes in cross-cultural training and diversity management. His field of expertise is cross-cultural leadership.

== Research ==
Müller-Plathe has worked on the molecular simulation of fluids, polymers and materials, with a focus on polymer materials, e.g. interphases, and molecular processes occurring inside them, e.g. permeation. His work also includes major development efforts for computational methods, algorithms, models and software. Methods which go back to him are the Iterative Boltzmann Inversion (IBI) used for generating systematically coarse-grained polymer models for multiscale modeling, reverse non-equilibrium molecular dynamics (RNEMD) for the calculation of thermal conductivities and shear viscosities, as well as the phantom-wall method for obtaining interfacial free energies for the wetting of solid substrates by complex fluids.

== Awards ==
In 2014, Müller-Plathe was awarded the Athene-Award for interdisciplinary teaching by the Giersch-Foundation. From 1979 to 1985, he held a scholarship of the Studienstiftung des Deutschen Volkes.

== Memberships ==
In 2009, Müller-Plathe was elected a regular member of the class of mathematics and sciences of the Akademie der Wissenschaften und der Literatur, Mainz, Germany.
