= Henry M. Jackson =

American politician (1912–1983)

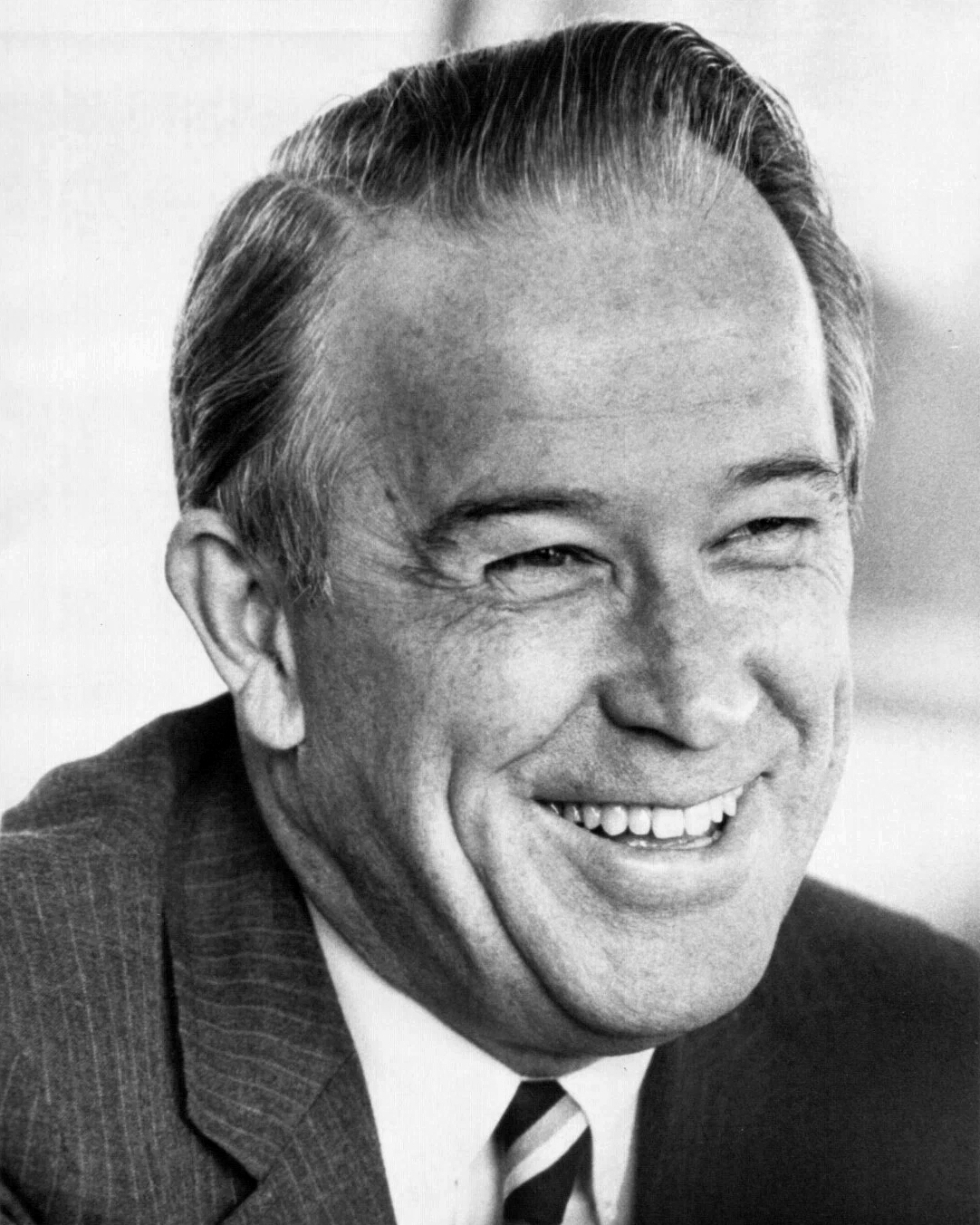
- Jackson c. 1971

United States Senator from Washington
- In office January 3, 1953 – September 1, 1983
- Preceded by: Harry P. Cain
- Succeeded by: Daniel J. Evans
Senate positions
Chair of the Senate Energy Committee
In office January 3, 1963 – January 3, 1981
Preceded by	Clinton Anderson
Succeeded by	Jim McClure
Ranking Member of the Senate Energy Committee
In office January 3, 1981 – January 3, 1983
Preceded by	Mark Hatfield
Succeeded by	J. Bennett Johnston
Ranking Member of the Senate Armed Services Committee
In office January 3, 1983 – September 1, 1983
Preceded by	John Stennis
Succeeded by	Sam Nunn

29th Chair of the Democratic National Committee
- In office July 17, 1960 – January 21, 1961
- Preceded by: Paul Butler
- Succeeded by: John Moran Bailey

Member of the U.S. House of Representatives from Washington's 2nd district
- In office January 3, 1941 – January 3, 1953
- Preceded by: Monrad Wallgren
- Succeeded by: Jack Westland
House positions
Chair of the House Indian Affairs Committee
In office January 15, 1945 – August 2, 1946
Preceded by	James F. O'Connor
Succeeded by	Committee abolished

Snohomish County Prosecuting attorney
- In office 1938–1940

Personal details
- Born: Henry Martin Jackson; May 31, 1912 Everett, Washington, U.S.
- Died: September 1, 1983 (aged 71) Everett, Washington, U.S.
- Resting place: Evergreen Cemetery
- Party: Democratic
- Spouse: Helen Hardin (m. 1961)
- Children: 2
- Education: Stanford University (BA); University of Washington (JD)

Military service
- Allegiance: United States
- Branch/service: United States Army
- Years of service: 1941–1942
- Battles/wars: World War II

Henry Martin "Scoop" Jackson (May 31, 1912 – September 1, 1983) was an American lawyer and politician who served as a U.S. representative (1941–1953) and U.S. senator (1953–1983) from the state of Washington. A Cold War liberal and anti-Communist member of the Democratic Party, Jackson supported higher military spending and a hard line against the Soviet Union, while also supporting social welfare programs, civil rights, and labor unions.

Born in Everett, Washington, to Norwegian immigrants, Jackson practiced law in Everett, after graduating from the University of Washington School of Law. He won election to Congress in 1940, and joined the Senate in 1953 after defeating incumbent Republican Party senator Harry P. Cain. Jackson supported the civil rights movement of the 1960s, and authored the National Environmental Policy Act, which helped establish the principle of publicly analyzing environmental impacts. He co-sponsored the Jackson–Vanik amendment, which denied normal trade relations to non-capitalist countries with restrictive emigration policies. Jackson served as chairman of the United States Senate Committee on Energy and Natural Resources from 1963 to 1981. He was twice an unsuccessful candidate for the Democratic Party nomination, in both the 1972 and 1976 presidential elections. While still serving in the Senate, Jackson died in 1983.

His political beliefs were characterized by support of civil rights, human rights, and safeguarding the environment, but with an equally strong commitment to oppose totalitarianism in general and – with the start of the Cold War — communist rule in particular. Jackson's political philosophies and positions have been cited as an influence on a number of key figures associated with neoconservatism, including Paul Wolfowitz and Richard Perle, both of whom previously served as aides to Jackson.

== Early life and career ==
Jackson was born in the home of his parents, Marine (née Andersen) and Peter Jackson, in Everett, Washington, on May 31, 1912. His mother and father were both immigrants from Norway. Peter Jackson was born Peter Gresseth in the Kristiansund area, and changed his name when he immigrated. He met Marine, who was born in Alvenes, at the Lutheran church in Everett, where they were married in 1897. Henry was the fifth, and youngest, of the Jackson children; he was nicknamed "Scoop" by his sister in his childhood, after a comic strip character that he was said to have resembled. Jackson was a member of the National Honor Society. He graduated with a Bachelor of Arts from Stanford University and a Juris Doctor from the University of Washington School of Law, where he joined the Delta Chi fraternity.

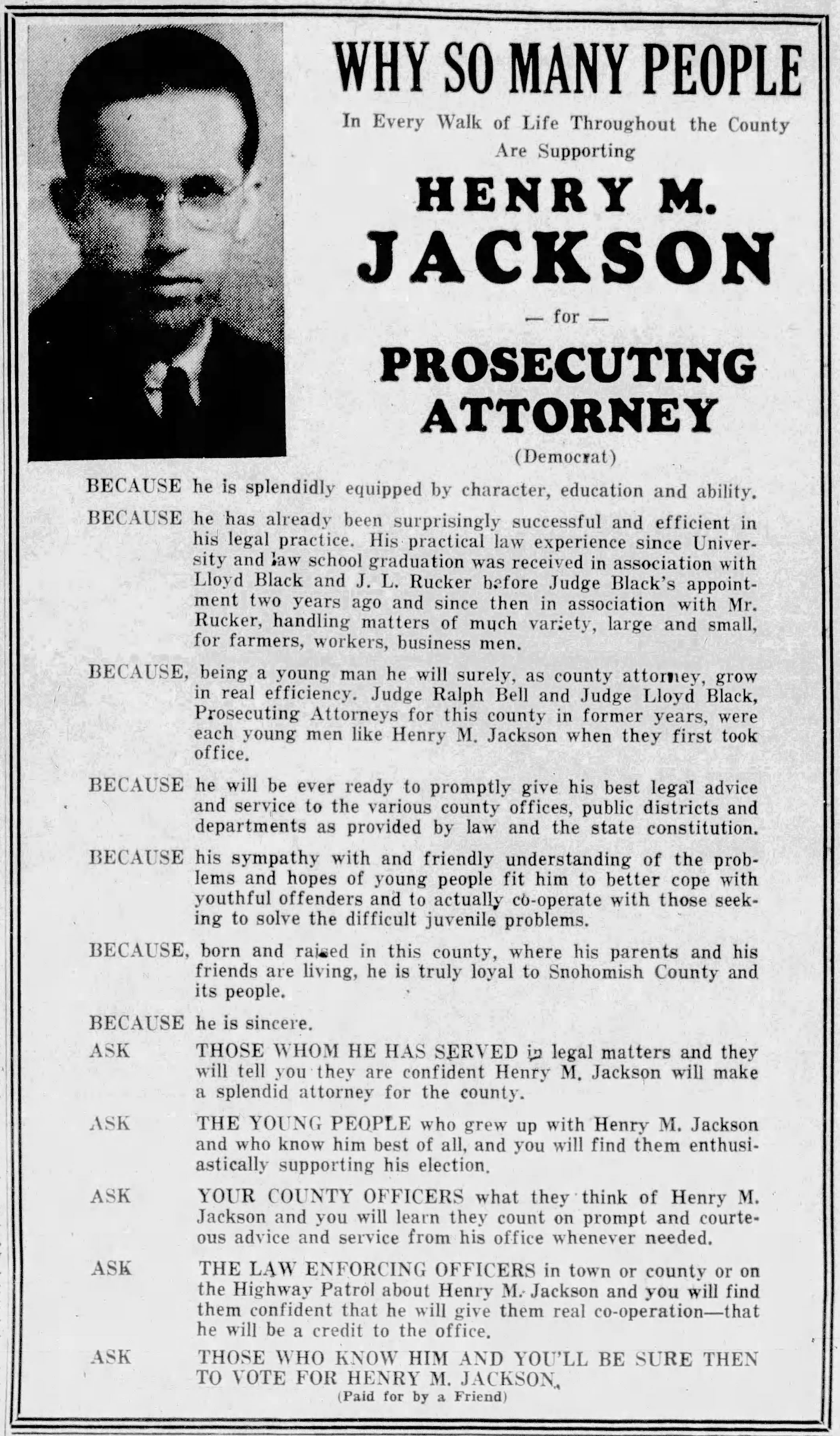
Advertisement for Jackson's prosecuting attorney candidacy published in The Everett Daily Herald, September 9, 1938

In 1935, the year of his law school graduation, he was admitted to the bar, and began to practice law in Everett. He found immediate success, and was elected to become the prosecuting attorney for Snohomish County from 1938 to 1940, where he made a name for himself prosecuting bootleggers and gamblers.

== United States Representative ==
Jackson successfully ran for the U.S. Congress as a Democrat in 1940 and took his seat in the House of Representatives with the 77th Congress on January 3, 1941. From then on, Jackson did not lose any congressional elections. Jackson joined the Army when the United States entered World War II but left when Franklin D. Roosevelt ordered all representatives to return home or resign their seats. He visited the Buchenwald concentration camp a few days after its liberation in 1945. He also visited his parents' native country Norway, where he observed the repatriation to Russia of Red Army soldiers captured by the Nazis, in which he recalled

"I remember how reluctant most Russians were to return to the Soviet Union. They knew they would have even less freedom there."

He attended the International Maritime Conference in Copenhagen, Denmark, in 1945 with the American delegation, and he was elected president of the same conference in 1946, when it was held in Seattle. From 1945 to 1947, Jackson was also the chairman of the House Indian Affairs Committee.

== United States Senator ==
In the 1952 U.S. House election, Jackson relinquished his seat in the House for a run for one of Washington's Senate seats. Jackson soundly defeated Republican senator Harry P. Cain and remained a senator for over thirty years. He was Washington's first U.S. senator to be born in the state. Jackson died in office in 1983 after winning re-election for the fifth time in 1982.

Although Jackson opposed the excesses of Joe McCarthy, who had traveled to Washington state to campaign against him, he criticized Dwight Eisenhower for not spending enough on national defense. Jackson called for more inter-continental ballistic missiles in the national arsenal, and his support for nuclear weapons resulted in a primary challenge from the left in 1958, when he handily defeated Seattle peace activist Alice Franklin Bryant before winning re-election with 67 percent of the vote, which he topped the next four times he ran for re-election.

During the 1960 Democratic Party presidential primaries, Jackson was the first choice of fellow senator John F. Kennedy for a running mate; Kennedy became convinced that a Southerner would better balance the ticket. Lyndon B. Johnson was later selected. Jackson boasted one of the strongest records on civil rights during the civil rights movement. He supported the 1957 and the 1964 Civil Rights Acts. On July 22, 1965, Johnson signed the Water Resources Planning Act into law, citing Jackson as one of the Congress members to "have made a very invaluable and very farsighted contribution to America's future." In April 1968, responding to the assassination of Martin Luther King Jr., Jackson gave a speech about the legacy and injustice of inequality.

In 1963, Jackson was made chairman of the Committee on Interior and Insular Affairs, which became the Committee on Energy and Natural Resources in 1977, a position he held until 1981. In the 1970s, Jackson joined with fellow senators Ernest Hollings and Edward Kennedy in a press conference to oppose Gerald Ford's request for Congress to end Richard Nixon's price controls on domestic oil, which had provoked oil companies into withholding gasoline during the 1973 oil crisis. Kaufman writes that, after 1968, Jackson "emerged as an intellectual and political leader in the perennial struggle of U.S. foreign policy to reconcile ideals with self-interest."

Jackson authored the National Environmental Policy Act, which has been called one of the most influential environmental laws in history. It helped to stimulate similar laws and the principle of publicly analyzed environmental impact in other states and in much of the world. Jackson was also a leader of the fight for statehood for Alaska and Hawaii. In 1974, Jackson sponsored the Jackson–Vanik amendment in the Senate (with Charles Vanik sponsoring it in the House), which denied normal trade relations to certain countries with non-market economies that restricted the freedom of emigration. The amendment was intended to help refugees, particularly minorities, specifically Jews, to emigrate from the Soviet Bloc. Jackson and his assistant, Richard Perle, also lobbied personally for some people who were affected by this law such as Natan Sharansky.

Throughout his time as senator, Jackson was a strong supporter of Israel. In 1970, he urged President Nixon to sell F-4 Phantom II fighter jets to that country, on the terms that amounted to a grant. During the Yom Kippur War, Jackson, alongside fellow Congressional leaders demanded an urgent resupply of weapons, to ensure that Israeli forces would have the material, diplomatic and political support necessary for a victory. When the Nixon administration balked at direct and visible material support, Jackson worked with Secretary of Defense James Schlesinger, Director of the Bureau of Political-Military Affairs Seymor Weiss, and senior American military commanders, notably Chief of Naval Operations Elmo Zumwalt, to secure the decision to airlift vital weapons and ammunition to a "gravely imperiled IDF". In December 1968 Jackson declined Nixon's offer to serve as Secretary of Defense.

In 1975, after President Gerald Ford announced he would not invite Soviet dissident Aleksander Solzhenitsyn to the White House, for fear of angering the Soviet Union, Jackson and a group of other senators asked Solzhenitsyn to speak at an office in the Capitol. Jackson was also one of the first senators to call for the normalization of relations with China, and was instrumental in arranging many business, educational, and community contacts between Washington and China.

In March 1975, Jackson released a statement in which he expressed the view that it was paramount the Franklin Peroff case be found out to be either "an aberration or was symptomatic of much greater problem" within the Drug Enforcement Administration. In June 1975, Jackson stated that if accounts about the conduct of former director of the Drug Enforcement Agency John R. Bartels Jr. were correct then his actions amounted to obstruction of justice and that evidence disclosed "in the last two days would indicate that there was a conscious, premeditated plan involving misconduct at the highest levels of the D.E.A."

In July 1977, the Senate approved a funding for the experimental nuclear reactor compromise proposal by Jackson and Idaho senator Frank Church. While the initial version by Jimmy Carter sought a decrease in funding from 150 million to 33 million, the Jackson and Church measure halved the funding to 75 million. In October 1979, the Senate voted in favor of Carter's energy mobilization board plan, Jackson labeling the plan the "centerpiece" of Carter's program that was essential to guaranteeing the effectiveness of the rest of the legislation and was noted for successfully persuading colleagues to reject amendments to the plan. Later that month, after the Senate Energy and Natural Resources Committee voted in favor of the Alaska public lands legislation, Carter issued a statement thanking Jackson and other members for supporting the legislation.

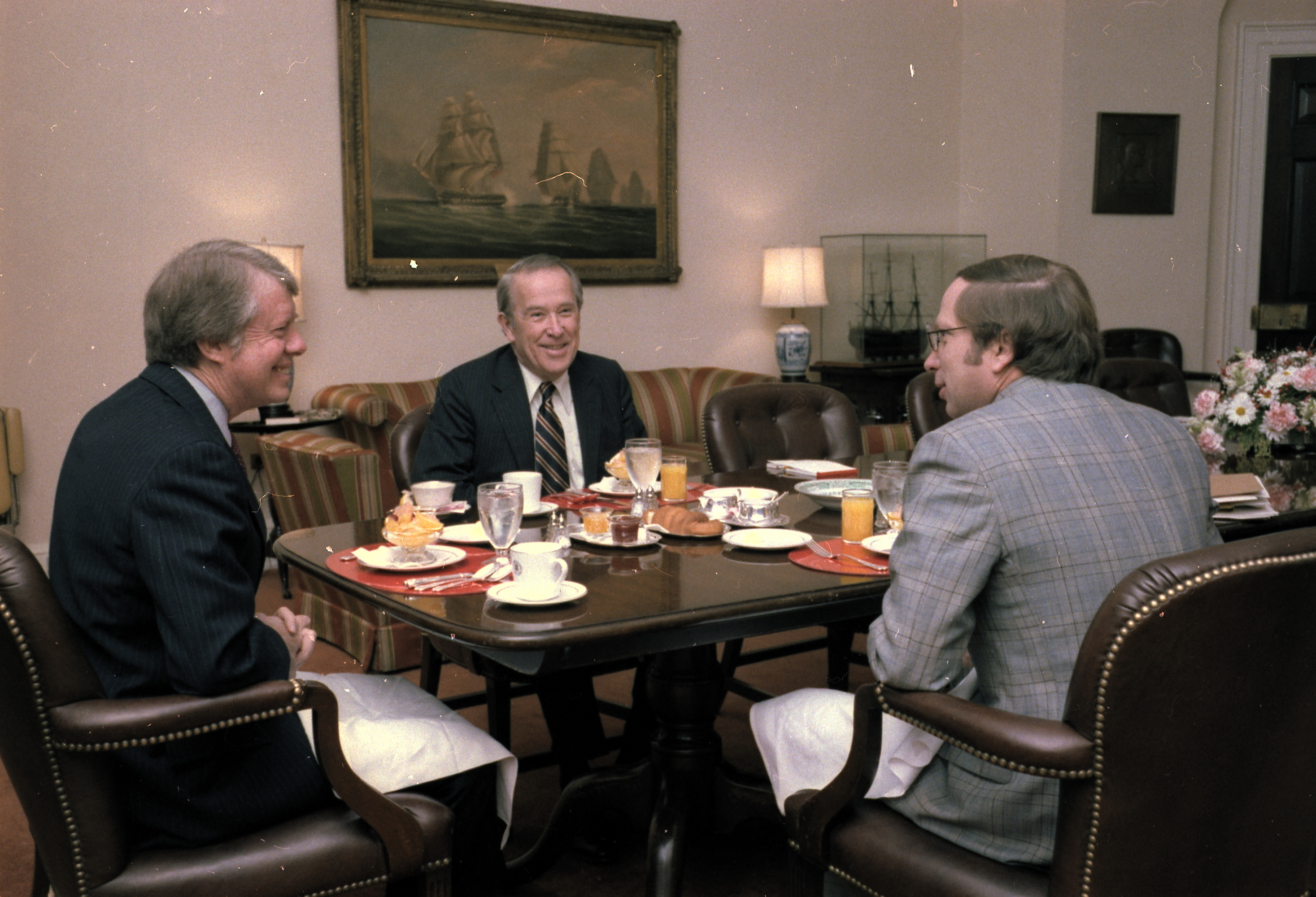
Jackson meets with President Jimmy Carter and fellow Senator Sam Nunn, December 14, 1977

Jackson led the opposition within the Democratic Party against the SALT II treaty. For decades, Democrats who support a strong international presence for the United States have been called "Scoop Jackson Democrats," and the term was still used to describe Democrats such as Joe Lieberman and R. James Woolsey Jr by the 2000s.

Jackson served for all but the last three years of his Senate tenure with Democratic colleague and friend Warren G. Magnuson. As a result, he spent 28 years as the state's junior senator, even though he had more seniority than all but a few of his colleagues. "Scoop" and "Maggie", as they affectionately called each other, gave Washington clout in national politics well beyond its population. They were one of the most effective delegations in the history of the Senate in terms of "bringing home the bacon" for their home state. Washington received nearly a sixth of public works appropriations but ranked only 23rd in population.

=== Criticism ===
Jackson was known as a hawkish Democrat. He was often criticized for his support for the Vietnam War and his close ties to the defense industries of his state. His proposal of Fort Lawton as a site for an anti-ballistic missile system was strongly opposed by local residents, and Jackson was forced to modify his position on the location of the site several times, but continued to support ABM development. American Indian rights activists who protested Jackson's plan to give Fort Lawton to Seattle, instead of returning it to local tribes, staged a sit-in. In the eventual compromise, most of Fort Lawton became Discovery Park, with 20 acres (8.1 ha) leased to United Indians of All Tribes, who opened the Daybreak Star Cultural Center there in 1977.

Opponents derided him as "the senator from Boeing", as well as a "whore for Boeing", because of his consistent support for additional military spending on weapons systems and accusations of wrongful contributions from the company; in 1965, 80% of Boeing's contracts were military. Jackson and Magnuson's campaigning for an expensive government supersonic transport plane project eventually failed. In addition, contrary to claims that he was an environmentalist, Jackson was almost as much a "whore for logging companies" as for Boeing, according to Carsten Lien's book Olympic Battleground.

After his death, critics pointed to Jackson's support for Japanese American internment camps during World War II as a reason to protest the placement of his bust at the University of Washington. Jackson was both an enthusiastic defender of the evacuation and a staunch proponent of the campaign to keep the Japanese-Americans from returning to the Pacific Coast after the war.

== Presidential campaigns ==
Jackson was not only successful as a politician in Washington state, but he also found recognition on the national level. He rose to the position of chairman of the Democratic National Committee in 1960, after being considered for the vice presidential ticket spot that eventually went to fellow senator Lyndon B. Johnson. Jackson ran for president twice, and both campaigns were noted for the hostile reception they received from the left wing of the Democratic Party. Jackson's one-on-one campaigning skills, which were extremely successful in Washington state, did not translate as well to the national stage. Even his supporters admitted that he suffered from a certain lack of charisma.

=== 1972 presidential campaign ===
Jackson was little known nationally when he first ran in 1972. George McGovern, who eventually won the nomination, even accused Jackson of racism for his opposition to busing despite Jackson's longstanding record on civil rights issues. Jackson's high point in the campaign was a distant third in the early Florida primary, but he failed to stand out of the pack of better-known rivals, and he made real news only later in the campaign, as part of the "Stop McGovern" coalition, which raised what would be known as the "Acid, Amnesty and Abortion" questions about McGovern. Jackson suspended active campaigning in May after a weak showing in the Ohio primary and finishing well behind McGovern, Ed Muskie, George Wallace, and Hubert Humphrey in early primaries.

Jackson re-emerged at the July Democratic convention after the runner-up, Humphrey, dropped out of the race. Jackson's name was placed in nomination by Georgia governor Jimmy Carter, and he finished second in the delegate roll call, well behind nominee McGovern. While campaigning in New York City, Jackson invited Meir Kahane, the leader of the violent organization the Jewish Defense League, to stand with him on stage to gain favor with Jewish Americans.

=== 1976 presidential campaign ===
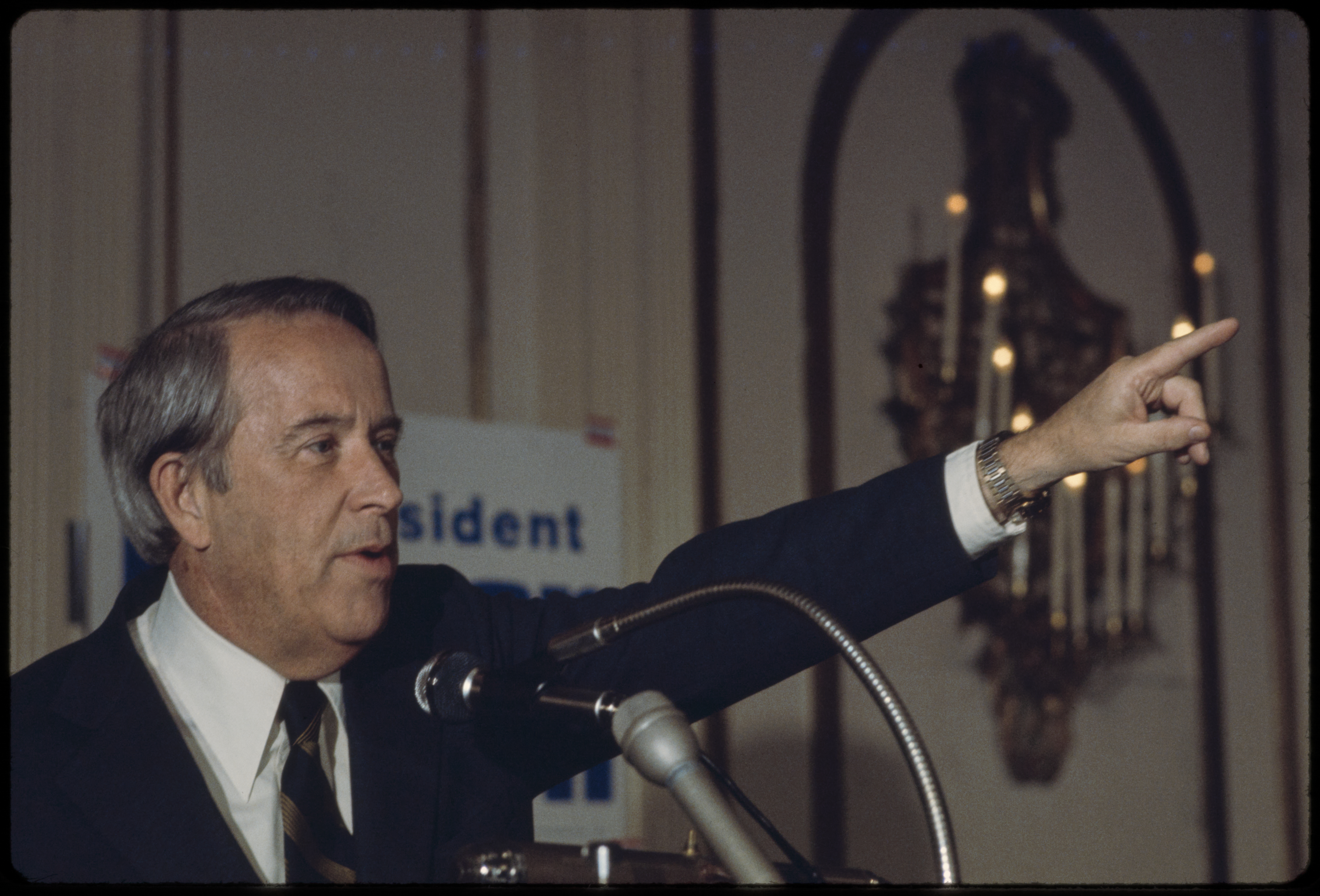
Jackson campaigning in the 1976 Democratic presidential primaries

Jackson raised his national profile by speaking out on Soviet-U.S. relations and Middle East policy regularly, and he was considered a front-runner for the nomination when he announced the start of his campaign in February 1975. Jackson received substantial financial support from Jewish-Americans who admired his pro-Israel views, but his support of the Vietnam War resulted in hostility from the left wing of the Democratic Party. Jackson chose to run on social issues, emphasizing law and order and his opposition to busing. He was hoping for support from labor, but the possibility that Hubert Humphrey might enter the race caused unions to offer only lukewarm support. Jackson made the fateful decision not to compete in the early Iowa caucus and New Hampshire primary, which Carter won after liberals split their votes among four other candidates. Even though Jackson won the Massachusetts and New York primaries, he dropped out on May 1 after losing the critical Pennsylvania primary to Carter by 12% and running out of money.

== Death ==
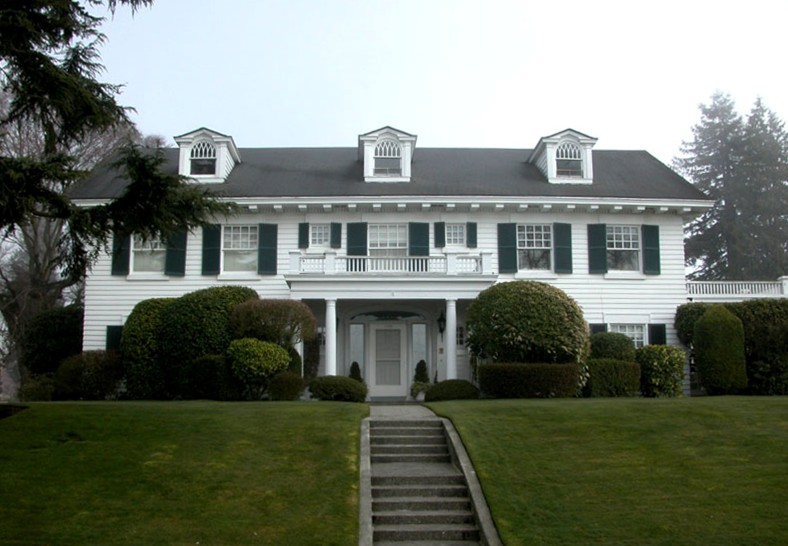
Jackson's home on Grand Avenue in Everett

On the evening of September 1, 1983, Jackson suffered an aortic dissection at his home in Everett, and was pronounced dead at nearby Providence Hospital at the age of 71. His death came suddenly, occurring hours after he had given a news conference condemning the Soviet attack on Korean Air Lines Flight 007.

Jackson's death was greatly mourned. New York Senator Daniel Patrick Moynihan stated that "Henry Jackson is proof of the old belief in the Judaic tradition that at any moment in history goodness in the world is preserved by the deeds of 36 just men who do not know that this is the role the Lord has given them. Henry Jackson was one of those men." Jackson is buried in Evergreen Cemetery in Everett.

== Personal life ==
In 1961, Jackson, called by Time the Senate's "most eligible bachelor", married Helen Hardin, a 28-year-old Senate receptionist who was 20 years his junior. Jackson did not move out of his childhood home, where he lived with his unmarried sisters for several years. The Jacksons had two children: Anna Marie Laurence and Peter Jackson. Peter went on to serve as a speechwriter for Governor Christine Gregoire and to lead the effort to found the Center for Human Rights at the University of Washington, which now has a scholarship in his name.

== Legacy ==
Jackson was posthumously awarded the Presidential Medal of Freedom in 1984. Ronald Reagan called him "one of the greatest lawmakers of our century", and stated:

"Scoop Jackson was convinced that there's no place for partisanship in foreign and defense policy. He used to say, 'In matters of national security, the best politics is no politics.' His sense of bipartisanship was not only natural and complete; it was courageous. He wanted to be President, but I think he must have known that his outspoken ideas on the security of the Nation would deprive him of the chance to be his party's nominee in 1972 and '76. Still, he would not cut his convictions to fit the prevailing style. I'm deeply proud, as he would have been, to have Jackson Democrats serve in my administration. I'm proud that some of them have found a home here."

Soviet dissident and later Israeli politician Natan Sharansky recalled when he was imprisoned by the KGB that

"There was one name mentioned not once, not dozens, but hundreds of times, the name of the man who was singled out as head of this plot, as my closest and most important comrade in crime. It was the name of a man whom I had never met or spoken to on the telephone, but who symbolized for me all those in the free world who had supported the struggle for Soviet Jewry, the very best that was in the West. It was the name of Senator Henry Jackson."

In 1983, Jackson was awarded Delta Chi of the Year. One of Jackson's last acts as Senator was to sponsor legislation creating what became the Henry M. Jackson Foundation for the Advancement of Military Medicine, which was named after him after his death. Jackson's extended community of staff, colleagues and family members created the Henry M. Jackson Foundation from public monies and private donations to give grants to nonprofits and educational institutions. Its board members have included Richard Perle, Tom Foley, and Jeane Kirkpatrick.

The U.S. Navy Ohio-class ballistic missile submarine Henry M. Jackson was named after him, in recognition of his longtime support of the nation's military. It is the only Ohio-class submarine not named after a U.S. state. On March 28, 1981, Jackson gave the principal address at the christening of the USS Bremerton (SSN 698). The Bremerton was the second ship to have the name, preceded by the USS Bremerton (CA 130). It was christened by Mrs. Henry M. Jackson on July 22, 1978. The USS Bremerton (SSN 698) was mentioned in the classic Tom Clancy novel, The Hunt for Red October. The University of Washington has named the Jackson School of International Studies in his honor. However, students objecting to Jackson's hawkish views on the Cold War in the mid-1980s caused the university to move a bust of the senator to the end of an abandoned corridor until it was restored to a more prominent place outside the Jackson School in 2006.

In 1983, the Snohomish County Public Utility District began operation of the Henry M. Jackson Hydroelectric Project outside Sultan, Washington. In 1994, the Everett School District completed construction of Henry M. Jackson High School in Mill Creek, Washington. The Henry M. Jackson Wilderness Area was created in his honor by the 1984 Washington Wilderness Act. The Jewish Institute for National Security Affairs, with the cooperation of the Jackson family, awards a Henry M. "Scoop" Jackson Distinguished Service Award to individuals for their career dedication to U.S. national security. Jackson won the first award in 1982, and it was named after him after his death. Winners include Max Cleland, Joe Lieberman, Dick Cheney, Jane Harman, and Paul Wolfowitz.

The Seattle-based Henry M. Jackson Foundation was created in 1983 by his former colleagues and staff, as well as his widow and other family members, to further his work. In 1987, the Department of Defense gave to the Jackson Foundation a one-time, $10 million appropriation for its endowment, in honor of the Senator. To date, the Foundation has awarded over $26 million in grants to educational and non-profit institutions. Jackson also sponsored legislation to form the Foundation to Advance Military Medicine, which was later renamed in his honor at the time of his death, to the Henry M. Jackson Foundation for the Advancement of Military Medicine.

=== Influence on neoconservatism ===
Jackson believed that evil should be confronted with power. His support for civil rights and equality at home, married to his opposition to détente, his support for human rights, along with that of democratic allies, and his firm belief that the United States could be a force for good in the world, inspired a legion of loyal aides who went on to propound Jackson's philosophy as part of neoconservatism. In addition to Richard Perle, neoconservatives Paul Wolfowitz, Bill Kristol, Elliott Abrams, Charles Horner, and Douglas Feith were former Democratic aides to Jackson who, disillusioned with the Carter administration, supported Ronald Reagan and joined his administration in 1981, later becoming prominent foreign policy makers in the 21st-century Bush administration. Neoconservative Ben Wattenberg was a prominent political aide to Jackson's 1972 and 1976 presidential campaigns. Wolfowitz has called himself a "Scoop Jackson Republican" on multiple occasions. Many journalists and scholars across the political spectrum have noted links between Senator Jackson and modern neoconservatism.

Jackson's influence on foreign policy has been cited as foundational to the George W. Bush administration's foreign policy, and the Iraq War. Jackson biographer Robert Kaufman says "There is no question in my mind that the people who supported Iraq are supporting Henry Jackson's instincts." Peter Beinart argues that the Democratic Party should return to Jackson's values in its foreign policy, criticizing current-day neoconservatives for failing to adopt Jackson's domestic policy views along with his foreign policy views.

=== Henry Jackson Society ===
In 2005, the Henry Jackson Society was formed at the University of Cambridge, England. The non-partisan British group is dedicated to "pursuit of a robust foreign policy ... based on clear universal principles such as the global promotion of the rule of law, liberal democracy, civil rights, environmental responsibility and the market economy" as part of "Henry Jackson's legacy." The organization is now based in London and hosts high-profile speaker events in the House of Commons.

=== Jackson Papers controversy ===
Jackson's documents were donated to the University of Washington shortly after his death in 1983, and have been archived there ever since. When the materials were donated in 1983, university staff removed all information considered classified at the time. Additional materials were added to the collection until 1995. At some point, library staff discovered a classified document in the collection and sent it to the government for declassification. In response, in the summer of 2004, a man who identified himself as an employee of the Central Intelligence Agency (CIA) called the University of Washington asking to inspect Senator Jackson's archived documents housed there. He found a document labeled as classified and showed this to a librarian. In February 2005, 22 years after Jackson's death, a five-person team including staff of the CIA, Department of Defense, the Department of Energy, and the Information Security Oversight Office came to the library to review all of Jackson's papers to remove anything still considered classified, or reclassified since then. The Department of Energy found nothing of concern, but the CIA blanked lines in about 20 papers and pulled 8 documents out of collection. As of 2018, some files in the collection are available only to those regarded by the library as "serious researchers", who must first sign a release not to divulge some of the information contained in the files.

== Electoral history ==
U.S. Senate (Class 1) elections in Washington: Results 1952–1982
Year	Democrat	Votes	Pct	Republican	Votes	Pct	3rd party	Party	Votes	Pct	3rd party	Party	Votes	Pct
1952	Henry M. Jackson	595,288	56.23%	Harry P. Cain	460,884	43.53%	Thomas C. Rabbitt	Progressive	1,912	0.18%	Henry Killman	Socialist Labor	651	0.06%
1958	Henry M. Jackson	597,040	67.32%	William B. Bantz	278,271	31.38%	Henry Killman	Socialist Labor	7,592	0.86%	Archie G. Idso	Constitution	2,257	0.26%
1964	Henry M. Jackson	875,950	72.21%	Lloyd J. Andrews	337,138	27.79%								
1970	Henry M. Jackson	879,385	82.43%	Charles W. Elicker	170,790	16.01%	William Massey	Socialist Workers	9,255	0.87%	Edison Fisk	Buffalo	7,377	0.69%
1976	Henry M. Jackson	1,071,219	71.84%	George M. Brown	361,546	24.25%	Dave Smith	American Independent	28,182	1.89%	Richard K. Kenney	Libertarian	19,373	1.30%
1982	Henry M. Jackson	943,665	68.96%	Douglas Jewett	332,273	24.28%	King Lysen	Independent	72,297	5.28%	Jesse Chiang	Independent	20,251	1.48%

== See also ==
- Coalition for a Democratic Majority
- Henry M. Jackson High School
- List of United States Democratic Party presidential tickets
- List of members of the United States Congress who died in office (1950–1999)
- Washington's congressional delegations

U.S. House of Representatives
Preceded by Monrad Wallgren	Member of the U.S. House of Representatives from Washington's 2nd congressional district 1941–1953	Succeeded by Jack Westland
Party political offices
Preceded by Hugh Mitchell	Democratic nominee for U.S. Senator from Washington (Class 1); 1952, 1958, 1964, 1970, 1976, 1982	Succeeded by Mike Lowry
Preceded by Paul M. Butler	Chair of the Democratic National Committee; 1960–1961	Succeeded by John Moran Bailey
Vacant Title last held by Howard Baker, George H. W. Bush, Peter Dominick, Gerald Ford, Robert Griffin, Thomas Kuchel, Mel Laird, Bob Mathias, George Murphy, Dick Poff, Chuck Percy, Al Quie, Charlotte Reid, Hugh Scott, Bill Steiger, John Tower	Response to the State of the Union address 1970; Served alongside: Donald Fraser, Mike Mansfield, John McCormack, Patsy Mink, Ed Muskie, Bill Proxmire	Succeeded by Mike Mansfield
U.S. Senate
Preceded by Harry P. Cain	United States Senator (Class 1) from Washington; 1953–1983; Served alongside: Warren Magnuson, Slade Gorton	Succeeded by Daniel J. Evans
Preceded by Clinton Anderson	Chair of the Senate Energy Committee; Interior Committee (1963–1977); 1963–1981	Succeeded by Jim McClure
Preceded by Mark Hatfield	Ranking Member of the Senate Energy Committee; 1981–1983	Succeeded by J. Bennett Johnston
Preceded by John C. Stennis	Ranking Member of the Senate Armed Services Committee; 1983	Succeeded by Sam Nunn
