= Jennifer B. Glass =

American scientist

- Born: Olympia, Washington
- Education: University of Washington, Arizona State University
- Scientific career
- Workplaces: Georgia Tech
- Doctoral advisor: Ariel Anbar
- Website: http://www.jenniferglass.com

Jennifer B. Glass is a biogeochemist, geomicrobiologist, astrobiologist, and associate professor of biogeochemistry in the School of Earth and Atmospheric Sciences at the Georgia Institute of Technology in Atlanta, Georgia. Glass received the 2021 Thomas Hilker Award for Excellence in Biogeosciences from the American Geophysical Union. She was awarded the 2021 Alice C. Evans Award for Advancement of Women from the American Society of Microbiology.

== Education ==
Glass was born and raised in Olympia, Washington. She earned a B.Sc. of Earth and Space Sciences and Oceanography from University of Washington in Seattle, Washington. She received a Ph.D. in Geological Sciences from Arizona State University under the guidance of Professor Ariel Anbar. From 2011-2013, she was a NASA Astrobiology Postdoctoral Fellow at California Institute of Technology, in Pasadena, California, in the laboratory of Professor Victoria Orphan.

== Research ==
Glass serves as principal investigator on grants from the NASA Exobiology Program. She has published research on geochemistry and microbiology in context of the global biogeochemical cycles and astrobiology, including how microbial metal utilization co-evolved with Earth geochemistry and how microbial metabolisms influence greenhouse gas cycles. Her laboratory's current research focuses on microbial interactions with methane clathrate and astrobiology implications. She has collaborated with Loren Williams on the role of cations including iron as ribozyme cofactors.

== Publications ==
Her most cited peer-reviewed articles are

- Glass JB, Wolfe‐Simon F, Anbar AD. Coevolution of metal availability and nitrogen assimilation in cyanobacteria and algae. Geobiology. 2009 Mar;7(2):100-23. (Cited 164 times, according to Google Scholar)
- Zhu-Barker X, Cavazos AR, Ostrom NE, Horwath WR, Glass JB. The importance of abiotic reactions for nitrous oxide production. Biogeochemistry. 2015 Dec;126(3):251-67.(Cited 149 times, according to Google Scholar.)
- Tsementzi D, Wu J, Deutsch S, Nath S, Rodriguez-R LM, Burns AS, Ranjan P, Sarode N, Malmstrom RR, Padilla CC, Stone BK. SAR11 bacteria linked to ocean anoxia and nitrogen loss. Nature. 2016 Aug;536(7615):179-83. (Cited 101 times, according to Google Scholar.)

== Leadership ==
Glass serves as an Associate Editor for Applied and Environmental Microbiology and as a member of the NASA Planetary Science Advisory Committee. She is co-director of the Georgia Tech Astrobiology Program. She is a proponent of the GRExit movement in geosciences. Her scientific perspectives have been quoted by news outlets including CNN and Science Magazine.
