= Paul Butler (lawyer) =

American lawyer and politician

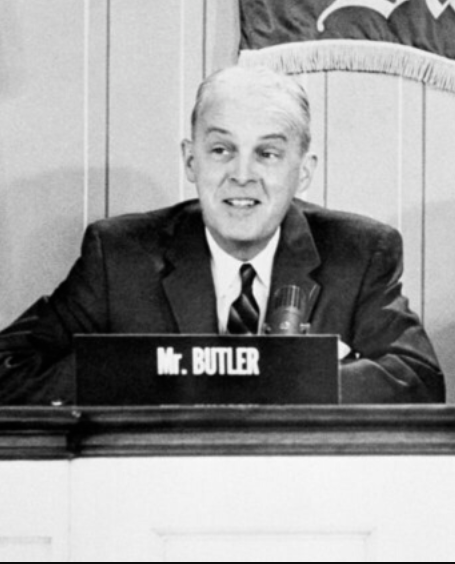
- Butler in 1956

Chair of the Democratic National Committee
- In office 1955–1960
- Preceded by: Stephen Mitchell
- Succeeded by: Henry M. Jackson

Personal details
- Born: Paul Mulholland Butler; June 15, 1905 South Bend, Indiana, U.S.
- Died: December 30, 1961 (aged 56) Washington, D.C., U.S.
- Party: Democratic
- Education: University of Notre Dame (LLB)

Paul Mulholland Butler (June 15, 1905 – December 30, 1961) was an American lawyer who served as the chairman of the Democratic National Committee from 1955 until 1960.

== Biography ==
After being active in Indiana Democratic Party politics, Butler was named to the Democratic National Committee in 1952, when he was a staunch ally of Adlai Stevenson. He later became DNC chairman and used the post to articulate policy positions in opposition to the Eisenhower administration. Butler's liberal ideology was opposed by conservative and moderate Democrats.

Party political offices
Preceded by Stephen Mitchell	Chair of the Democratic National Committee; 1955–1960	Succeeded by Henry M. Jackson
