= William Zerner =

Wilhelm Zerner (21 September 1882 – 28 May 1963), also known as William Zerner, was an Australian school principal and schoolteacher.

== Early life and education ==
Wilhelm Zerner was born on 21 September 1882 in Fassifern Scrub, Queensland, Australia. The third of ten children, Zerner's parents, Wilhelm and Margaretha (née Duhs) were Prussian-born farmers.

He attended the Dugandan and Templin state schools near Boonah, later spending four years as a pupil-teacher at the Templin School.

== Career ==
Moving to Roma, Zerner taught in several schools from 1902 to 1938.

At Nambour Rural School, where he taught from 1928, he encouraged the study of fruit packing.

In 1935, he was appointed an acting school inspector, and in August 1938, he became the supervisor of the Queensland Primary Correspondence School, which had around 5,000 students and 100 staff. In 1940, he established the Allen Lending Library; a year later, he introduced a radio programme into the curriculum, titled "My School Speaks" and broadcast by the Australian Broadcasting Commission. During World War II, even soldiers attended classes at Zerner's school, whose pupils aided in the war effort via the Australian Junior Red Cross.

== Later years and death ==
Zerner retired in June 1949, but was later appointed as Officer-in-Charge of the Special School for New Australians in Wacol East, Brisbane; he resigned in May 1952.

He was also the vice-president of the Queensland branch of the Royal Overseas League and a council member of both the Queensland Bush Children's Health Scheme and the Australian-American Association. Zerner died on 28 May 1963 in Brisbane.

== Personal life ==
Zerner married German-born dressmaker Ottillie Emilie Johanna Dittberner (died 1951). He was an adherent of the Anglican Church of Australia.
