= Barbara Ramsay Shaw =

American scientist

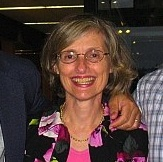
- Born: Newton, New Jersey
- Education: University of Washington, Bryn Mawr College
- Scientific career
- Workplaces: Duke University
- Doctoral advisors: Michael Schurr and Walter Kauzmann
- Doctoral students: Lawrence C Sowers, Robert Reynolds, Kenneth Porter, Loren Williams, Lisa (Frederico) Zuraw, Faqing Huang, Randall Richards, Mark Zottola, Kaizhang He, Jinlai Lin, Joy Wang, Hongyan Liu, Charlotta Wennefors, Laura Moussa, Mariam Sharaf, Marcus Cheek

Barbara Ramsay Shaw is the William T. Miller Distinguished Emeritus Professor of Chemistry at Duke University. She is known for her work on how DNA reacts with other compounds.

== Education and career ==
Shaw earned her B.A. from Bryn Mawr College in 1965. She has an M.S. (1967) and a Ph.D. in physical chemistry (1973) from the University of Washington. Her Ph.D. advisors were Michael Schurr, professor of chemistry at the University of Washington and Walter Kauzmann, professor of chemistry and member of the National Academy of Sciences at Princeton University. Shaw received her post-doctoral training from Kensal van Holde, professor of biochemistry and member of the National Academy of Sciences at Oregon State University. In 1975 Shaw moved to Duke University as an assistant professor, and by 1992 she had been promoted to full professor. In 2006 Shaw was named the William T Miller Distinguished Professor of Chemistry at Duke University.

== Research ==
In her graduate work, Shaw synthesized peptide sequences using solid phase synthesis. Shaw learned this technique from Bruce Merrifield at Rockefeller University. Merrifield won the 1984 Nobel Prize for his work. Shaw studied the spontaneous formation of helix coils in her peptide sequences using optical rotatory dispersion. Shaw is known for her later work on boranophosphates. While a postdoctoral researcher at Oregon State she helped establish the structure of the nucleosome. She has studied the chemical reactivity of DNA, and applied synthetic chemistry to gene expression, signal transduction, and cancer treatment.

== Awards and honors ==
Shaw was the first recipient from Duke University of the Camille Dreyfus Teacher-Scholar Award. In 1987, the YWCA in North Carolina named Shaw as one of their "women of achievement".

Shaw was known for her teaching. Among her students was Paul Farmer, professor at Harvard Medical School and founder of Partners in Health. Farmer called her "the most inspiring professor I ever had".

Shaw's large research group included students from Russia, the Middle East, and China.

== Selected publications ==
- Li, Ping; Sergueeva, Zinaida A.; Dobrikov, Mikhail; Shaw, Barbara Ramsay (1 November 2007). "Nucleoside and Oligonucleoside Boranophosphates: Chemistry and Properties". Chemical Reviews. 107 (11): 4746–4796. doi:10.1021/cr050009p. PMID 17967037.
- Frederico, Lisa A.; Kunkel, Thomas A.; Shaw, Barbara Ramsay (1 March 1990). "A sensitive genetic assay for the detection of cytosine deamination: determination of rate constants and the activation energy". Biochemistry. 29 (10): 2532–2537. doi:10.1021/bi00462a015. PMID 2185829.
- Williams, L D; Shaw, B R (1987). "Protonated base pairs explain the ambiguous pairing properties of O6-methylguanine". Proceedings of the National Academy of Sciences. 84 (7): 1779–1783. doi:10.1073/pnas.84.7.1779. ISSN 0027-8424. PMC 304524. PMID 3470757.
- Shaw, B R; Herman, T M; Kovacic, R T; Beaudreau, G S; Van Holde, K E (1976). "Analysis of subunit organization in chicken erythrocyte chromatin". Proceedings of the National Academy of Sciences. 73 (2): 505–509. Bibcode:1976PNAS...73..505S. doi:10.1073/pnas.73.2.505. ISSN 0027-8424. PMC 335938. PMID 1061151.
