= 1970 United States Senate election in Washington =

- November 3, 1970
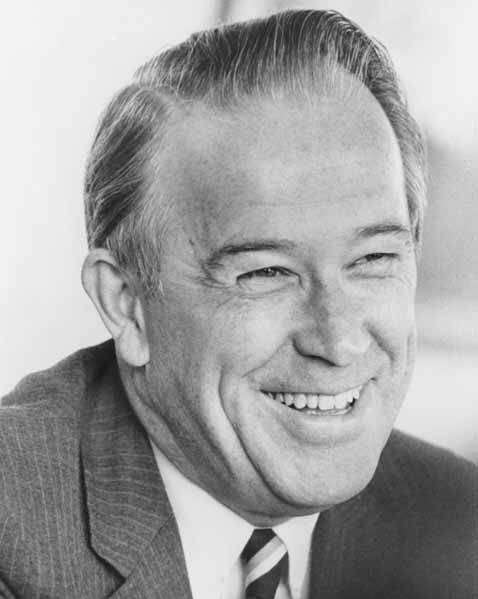

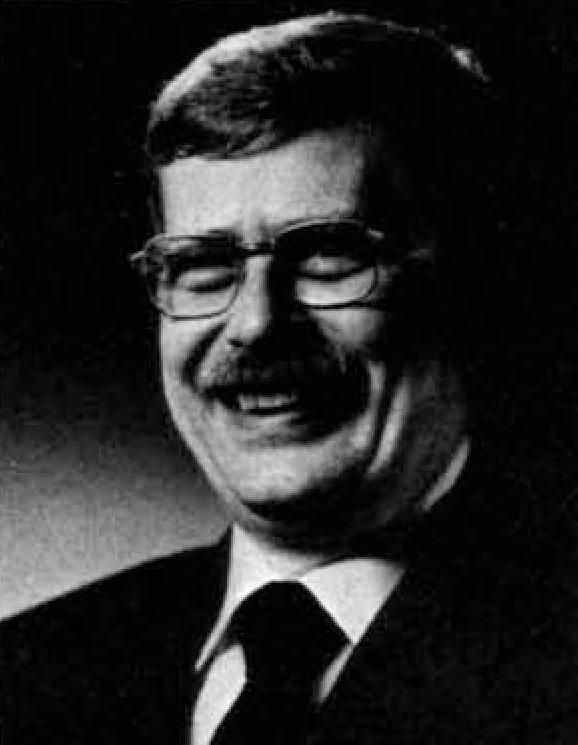
Nominee	Henry M. Jackson	Charles Elicker
Party	Democratic	Republican
Popular vote	879,385	170,790
Percentage	82.43%	16.01%
- County results Jackson: 60–70% 70–80% 80–90%
U.S. senator before election
Henry M. Jackson
Democratic
Elected U.S. Senator
Henry M. Jackson
Democratic

The 1970 United States Senate election in Washington was held on November 3, 1970. The Democratic incumbent Henry M. Jackson won a fourth term in office with a landslide victory over Republican state senator Charles Elicker.

== Blanket primary ==
In the Democratic Party primary, Henry M. Jackson, who had served in the United States Senate since 1953, faced criticism for his support of military spending and the Vietnam War. This position caused members of the national party involved in peace activism, including Eugene McCarthy, Allard K. Lowenstein, and John Kenneth Galbraith, to petition state politicians to challenge Jackson. They found Carl Maxey, the first African American in Eastern Washington to qualify as an attorney, who resigned his position as chair of the Washington Democratic Council, an anti-war organization, to run for office. Maxey had previously worked for Jackson on his Senate campaigns but he publicly opposed the Vietnam War, particularly in relation to the drafting of African Americans at disproportionate rates.

In May 1970, Maxey won the endorsement of the King County Democratic Convention. During the same month, President Richard Nixon announced an escalation to the Vietnam War as American forces invaded Cambodia. This decision led to protests across the country and the shooting of four anti-war protests at Kent State University in Ohio. Two months later, at the state party convention held in Spokane, Washington, supporters of Maxey disturbed the speech given by Jackson. The opposition pushed Jackson to the center of his party and he frequently said, "I'm proud of the fact that during my term in the Senate I opposed both McCarthys", comparing Eugene McCarthy and Joe McCarthy.

Jackson had support from state Republicans, who donated hundreds of thousands of dollars to his primary campaign. Montgomery Johnson, the state party chairman, and Governor Dan Evans had difficulty finding a Republican challenger as the national party, including Nixon, discouraged any strong opposition. They finally recruited state senator, Charles Elicker, who beat four other candidates to win the party nomination. In the primary on September 15, 1970, Jackson won the Democratic nomination with 497,309 votes and sweeping every county in the state. Maxey won second place in the blanket primary, with 79,201 votes and Elicker came in third with 33,262 votes. The other candidates were two Democrats, John "Hugo Frye" Patric and Clarice Privette, and four Republicans, R. J. "Bob" Odman, William H. Davis, Howard S. Reed and Bill Patrick.

=== Results ===
Results by county Jackson: 60–70%; 70–80%; 80–90%

1970 U.S. Senate primary election in Washington
Party	Candidate	Votes	%
Democratic	Henry M. Jackson (incumbent)	497,309	73.18%
Democratic	Carl Maxey	79,201	11.65%
Republican	Charles W. Elicker	33,262	4.89%
Republican	Howard S. Reed	22,293	3.28%
Republican	Robert J. "Big Bob" Odman	14,856	2.19%
Democratic	Paul Gumbell	24,559	3.05%
Republican	William H. Davis	11,207	1.65%
Republican	Bill Patrick	7,976	1.17%
Republican	John Patric	7,267	1.07%
Democratic	Clarice L.R. Privette	6,240	0.92%
Total votes		679,611	100.00%

== General election ==
Jackson was announced as the winner on November 3, 1970, three minutes after polls closed on election night. He had set the previous Washington record in 1964, which he broke by receiving 82% to Elicker's 16%, with two third party candidates sharing the remainder of the vote. The landslide victory prompted Elicker to say about his percentage, "I'm thinking of asking for a recount".

=== Results ===
1970 U.S. Senate election in Washington
Party	Candidate	Votes	%	±%
Democratic	Henry M. Jackson (incumbent)	879,385	82.43%	▲10.22
Republican	Charles W. Elicker	170,790	16.01%	▼11.78
Socialist Workers	Karl Bermann	9,255	0.87%	N/A
Buffalo	Edison Fink	7,377	0.69%	N/A
Total votes		1,066,807	100.00%	
Democratic hold		Swing		

== See also ==
- 1970 United States Senate elections
