= Alice Franklin Bryant =

American activist and writer (1898–1977)

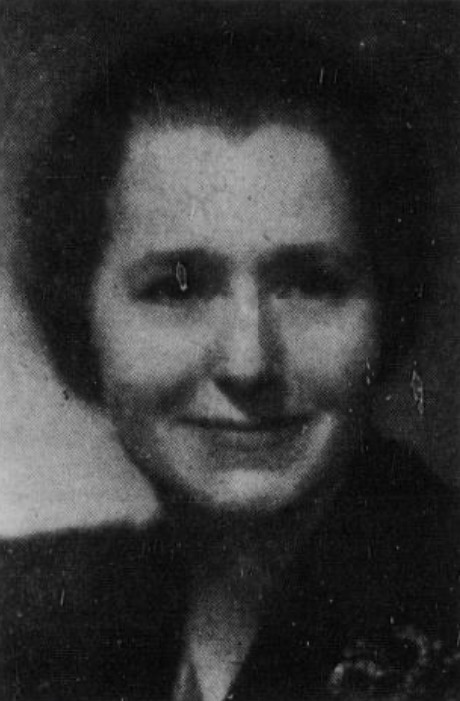
- Bryant in a 1952 publication
- Born: Alice Virginia Franklin; May 1, 1898; Fredericktown, Missouri, US
- Died: June 7, 1977 (aged 79); Seattle, Washington, US
- Occupations: Peace activist, author, educator, electoral candidate
- Political party: Democratic
- Relatives: Loren Williams (grandson)

Alice Franklin Bryant (born Alice Virginia Franklin; May 1, 1898 – June 7, 1977) was an American peace activist, author, educator, and electoral candidate. Subjected to internment in the Philippines during World War II, she advocated peace throughout the Cold War, writing extensively and visiting many world leaders.

== Biography ==
=== Early life and the Philippines ===
Bryant was born on May 1, 1898, in Fredericktown, Missouri, daughter of John Eddy Franklin. She lived for some time in Texas, and in 1919, moved to Capitol Hill, Seattle with her family. She studied at the University of Washington. She worked as an educator, teaching at Issaquah High School for one year. She traveled to Canton, China in late summer 1921 to teach English. Warfare between the forces of Sun Yat-Sen and Chen Jionming in Canton forced her to return to the United States in February 1923. She and her brother Shade traveled around the world in 1924. After the death of her mother and her father's remarriage, she decided to accept a teaching position in the town of Honokaa on the Big Island of Hawaii.

In 1927, Bryant moved to Manila, where she worked as an educator. She met and married William "Guv'nor" Cheney Bryant (died 1956), who moved to the Philippines in 1902. He had previously governed the provinces of Cotabato, Agusan del Sur, and Nueva Vizcaya, and operated a coconut plantation on the island of Negros while they were married. They had a daughter, Imogene, who was born in 1931. During World War II, they sent their daughter to the United States, and they hid in the mountains after Japan invaded the country; they were discovered by Japanese forces and were sent first to the Bacolod Internment Camp and then the Santo Tomas Internment Camp, where the couple remained imprisoned for the remainder of the war. She became a peace activist due to her experiences at the camp, especially living through the brutal fighting to liberate Manila.

=== Diplomacy ===
In 1945, Bryant moved back to Seattle. She wrote essays, letters, poetry, and children's literature, all of which were published in newspapers and magazines, as well as pamphlets and books. She met with world leaders such as Nikita Khrushchev in 1957 and Jawaharlal Nehru in 1951.

In 1951, Bryant and her husband used their reparation money – granted for their time in an internment camp – to fund a community center in Hiroshima. She returned to Japan in 1954 following the American-caused radiation exposure of Daigo Fukuryū Maru's crew. She presented an apology with 13,000 signatures to the Japanese Diet for the exposure.

She visited six countries under the Iron Curtain in 1968, including Czechoslovakia, where she visited shortly before the Russian suppression of the Prague Spring. For her last trip, she attended the World Conference on Women, 1975.

=== Electoral candidacy ===
A Democrat, Bryant ran in the 1952 Democratic primary for Washington's congressman-at large to the United States House of Representatives. She lost the primary election to Don Magnuson, whose victory is credited with voters confusing him for Senator Warren Magnuson. In her campaign, she promoted peace and human rights. She ran again in the Democratic primary for the 1st Congressional District in 1954 but again lost. In her unsuccessful 1958 and 1964 primary campaigns for United States Senate against Henry M. Jackson, she campaigned for an end to the arms race and against Jackson's militancy. In 1962 and 1966, she won the Democratic nomination for the 1st Congressional District but lost in the general election to the Republican incumbent, Thomas Pelly.

=== Death and legacy ===
Bryant died on June 7, 1977, aged 79, in Seattle, from illness. Her daughter Imogene too became a peace activist, and her grandson, Loren Williams, is a biologist.
