= Boranophosphate =

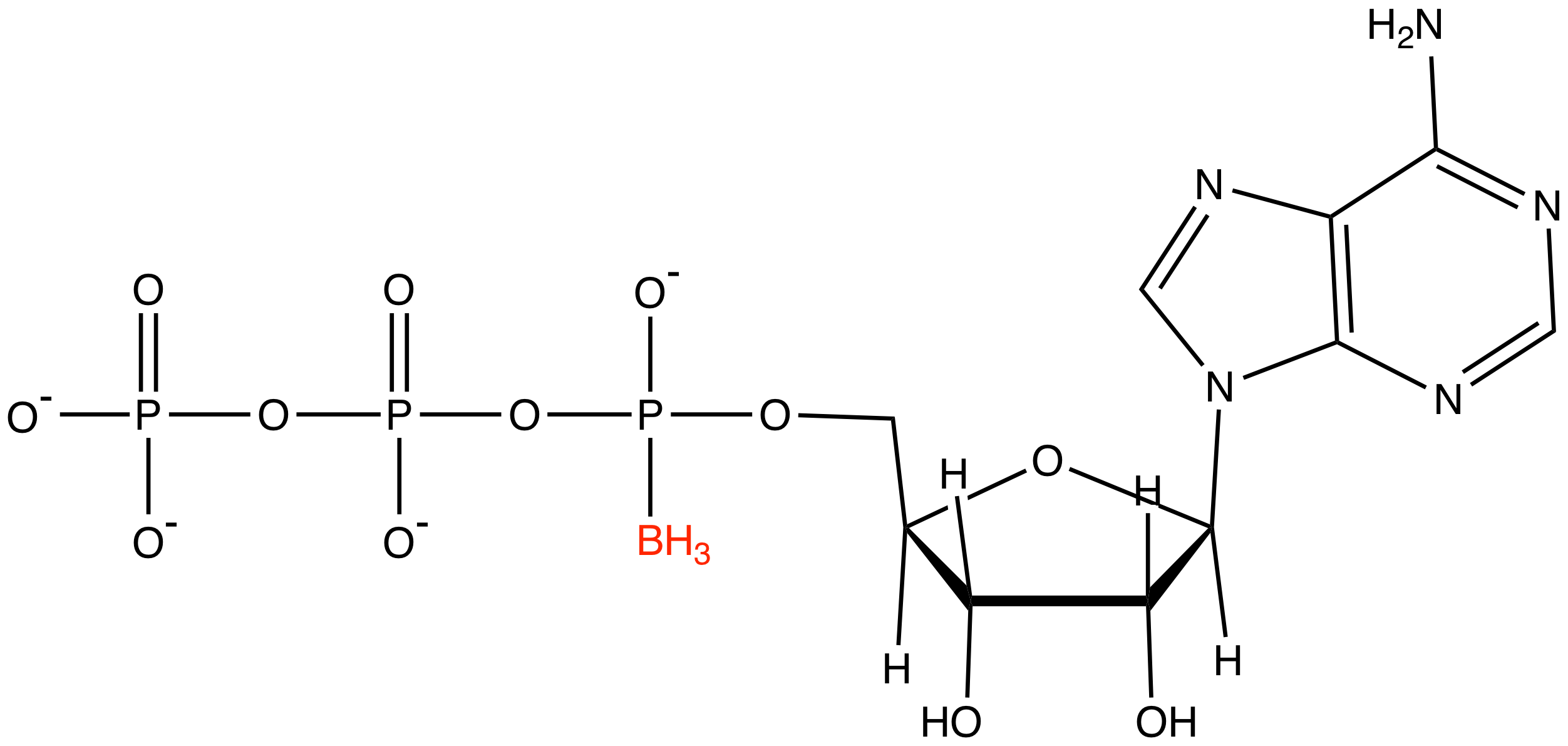
Structure of a boranophosphate analogue of ATP, the borane substituent is highlighted in red.

Boranophosphates are salts with an anion consisting of borane (BH_{3}) and phosphite groups. One of the simplest examples is [(CH_{3}O)_{2}OPBH_{3}]^{−}, prepared by base hydrolysis of the adduct of borane and trimethylphosphite.

Boranophosphates have gained attention as structural surrogates of phosphate group in living systems. In some compounds, borane replaces of one of the oxygens of a triphosphate or diphosphate functional group. Phosphorus remains tetrahedral, but the BH_{3}-appended phosphorus center is trivalent. Boranophosphates have been incorporated into nucleotides and studied as potential therapeutic and diagnostic agents. They are one of several covalent modifications of phosphodi- and triesters. The compounds are prepared by attaching the borane to the phosphoramidite stage in the synthesis of nucleosides. The P-BH_{3} bond is sufficiently robust to survive deprotection methods to allow formation of the triphosphate.

Aside from boranophosphates, other modifications of di- and triphosphates include phosphorothioates and methylphosphonate. They also are chiral at phosphorus.
