= Frank E. McKinney =

American politician (1904–1974)

Frank McKinney

Chair of the Democratic National Committee
- In office October 31, 1951 – August 9, 1952
- Preceded by: William M. Boyle
- Succeeded by: Stephen Mitchell

Personal details
- Born: Frank Edward McKinney Sr. June 16, 1904 Indianapolis, Indiana, U.S.
- Died: January 9, 1974 (aged 69) Indianapolis, Indiana, U.S.
- Party: Democratic
- Children: Frank
- Education: Indiana University, Bloomington; La Salle Extension University (BS)

Frank Edward McKinney Sr. (June 16, 1904 – January 9, 1974) was the chairman of the Democratic National Committee from 1951 through 1952. He was hand-picked for the post by then-President Harry S Truman.

== Early life and career ==
Born in Indianapolis, Indiana, McKinney served in the U.S. Army during World War II.

He was a delegate to several Democratic National Conventions from Indiana.

In addition to working as a banker and being active in Indiana politics, McKinney was a co-owner of several professional baseball teams, including the Louisville Colonels and his hometown Indianapolis Indians of the high-level minor-league American Association, and the Pittsburgh Pirates of Major League Baseball. He served as majority owner and club president of the Pirates from August 8, 1946, until July 18, 1950.

One of McKinney's first acts as DNC chairman was to advocate all collectors of internal revenue be civil service, rather than political patronage, jobs. McKinney was ousted from the DNC in 1952 by that year's presidential nominee, Adlai Stevenson. He later backed W. Averell Harriman for the 1956 presidential nomination.

Frank E. McKinney was appointed U.S. Ambassador to Spain on May 11, 1968, with the title Ambassador Extraordinary and Plenipotentiary. He presented credentials on May 11, 1968, and took the oath of office, but did not proceed to post under this appointment.

His son, Frank Jr., was an Olympic athlete.

Party political offices
Preceded by William M. Boyle	Chair of the Democratic National Committee; 1951–1952	Succeeded by Stephen Mitchell
