= Michael Zerner =

Michael Charles Zerner
- Born: January 31, 1940; Hull, Massachusetts
- Died: February 2, 2000 (aged 60); Gainesville, Florida
- Education: Harvard University
- Known for: ZINDO; Quantum chemistry semiempirical theories
- Scientific career
- Fields: Computational Chemistry
- Workplaces: University of Guelph, University of Florida
- Doctoral advisor: Martin Gouterman

Michael Charles Zerner (January 1, 1940 – February 2, 2000) was an American theoretical chemist, professor at the University of Guelph from 1970 to 1981 and University of Florida from 1981 to 2000. Zerner earned his Ph.D. under Martin Gouterman at Harvard, working with the spectroscopy of porphyrins. He conceived and wrote a quantum chemistry program, known as BIGSPEC or ZINDO, for calculating electronic spectra of big molecules. In 1996 Zerner was diagnosed with liver cancer, and died on February 2, 2000, survived by his wife and two children.
