= Political party strength in Illinois =

Politics in the US state of Illinois

Illinois is a Democratic stronghold in presidential elections and one of the "Big Three" Democratic strongholds alongside California and New York. It is one of the most Democratic states in the nation with all state executive offices and both state legislative branches held by Democrats. For most of its history, Illinois was widely considered to be a swing state, voting for the winner of all but two presidential elections in the 20th century. Political party strength in Illinois is highly dependent upon Cook County, and the state's reputation as a blue state rests upon the fact that over 40% of its population and political power is concentrated in Chicago, Cook County, and the Chicago metropolitan area. Outside of Chicago, the suburban collar counties continue trending Democratic while downstate Illinois can be considered more conservative with several Democratic leaning regions including Champaign-Urbana, Bloomington-Normal, Rockford, Peoria, the Quad Cities, and suburban St. Louis.

Illinois's electoral college votes have gone towards the Democratic presidential candidate for the past eight elections, and its congressional makeup tilts heavily Democratic with a 14–3 majority as of 2026. However, it has a history of competitive statewide elections and has elected a small number of moderate Republicans including Governors Jim Edgar, George Ryan, and Bruce Rauner, Senators Peter Fitzgerald and Mark Kirk, and other state executive officeholders including Judy Baar Topinka and Dan Rutherford.

The following table indicates the party of elected officials in the U.S. state of Illinois:

- Governor
- Lieutenant Governor
- Secretary of State
- Attorney General
- Comptroller (Auditor before 1972)
- Treasurer

The table also indicates the historical party composition in the:

- State Senate
- State House of Representatives
- State delegation to the U.S. Senate
- State delegation to the U.S. House of Representatives

== Table ==
Year	Executive offices						General Assembly		United States Congress			Electoral votes
Year	Governor	Lt. Governor	Sec. of State	Attorney General	Comptroller/ Auditor (Note: The Office of Illinois Auditor of Public Accounts existed from 1818–1973, when it was eliminated by the 1970 Constitution and replaced with the office of Comptroller. George W. Lindberg was the first Illinois Comptroller)	Treasurer	State Senate	State House	U.S. Senator (Class II)	U.S. Senator (Class III)	U.S. House	Electoral votes
1809	Ninian Edwards (DR) (Note: Territorial governor appointed by the President of the United States.)		Nathaniel Pope (DR)									
1810	Ninian Edwards (DR)		Nathaniel Pope (DR)									
1811	Ninian Edwards (DR)		Nathaniel Pope (DR)									
1812	Ninian Edwards (DR)		Nathaniel Pope (DR)		H. H. Maxwell						Shadrach Bond (DR) (Note: Delegate to the U.S. House of Representatives from Illinois Territory.)	
1813	Ninian Edwards (DR)		Nathaniel Pope (DR)		H. H. Maxwell						Shadrach Bond (DR)	
1814	Ninian Edwards (DR)		Nathaniel Pope (DR)		H. H. Maxwell						vacant	
1815	Ninian Edwards (DR)		Nathaniel Pope (DR)		H. H. Maxwell						Benjamin; Stephenson (DR)	
1816	Ninian Edwards (DR)		Nathaniel Pope (DR)		Daniel Pope Cook (DR)						Benjamin; Stephenson (DR)	
1817	Ninian Edwards (DR)		Joseph Phillips (DR)		Robert Blackwell						Nathaniel Pope (DR)	
1818	Ninian Edwards (DR)		Joseph Phillips (DR)		Elijah C. Berry (DR)						Nathaniel Pope (DR)	
1818	Shadrach Bond (DR)	Pierre Menard (DR)	Elias Kane (DR)	Daniel Pope Cook (DR)	Elijah C. Berry (DR)	John Thomas (DR)	DR majority	DR majority	Jesse B. Thomas (DR)	Ninian Edwards (DR)	John McLean (DR)	
1819	Shadrach Bond (DR)	Pierre Menard (DR)	Elias Kane (DR)	William Mears (DR)	Elijah C. Berry (DR)	R. K. McLaughlin (DR)	DR majority	DR majority	Jesse B. Thomas (DR)	Ninian Edwards (DR)	Daniel Pope; Cook (DR)	
1820	Shadrach Bond (DR)	Pierre Menard (DR)	Elias Kane (DR)	William Mears (DR)	Elijah C. Berry (DR)	R. K. McLaughlin (DR)	DR majority	DR majority	Jesse B. Thomas (DR)	Ninian Edwards (DR)	Daniel Pope; Cook (DR)	Monroe/ Tompkins (DR) ✓
1821	Shadrach Bond (DR)	Pierre Menard (DR)	Elias Kane (DR)	Samuel D. Lockwood (DR)	Elijah C. Berry (DR)	R. K. McLaughlin (DR)	DR majority	DR majority	Jesse B. Thomas (DR)	Ninian Edwards (DR)	Daniel Pope; Cook (DR)	Monroe/ Tompkins (DR) ✓
1822	Shadrach Bond (DR)	Pierre Menard (DR)	Samuel D. Lockwood (DR)	James Turney (DR)	Elijah C. Berry (DR)	R. K. McLaughlin (DR)	DR majority	DR majority	Jesse B. Thomas (DR)	Ninian Edwards (DR)	Daniel Pope; Cook (DR)	Monroe/ Tompkins (DR) ✓
1823	Edward Coles (DR)	Adolphus Hubbard (DR)	David Blackwell (DR)	James Turney (DR)	Elijah C. Berry (DR)	Abner Field (DR)	DR majority	DR majority	Jesse B. Thomas (DR)	Ninian Edwards (DR)	Daniel Pope; Cook (DR)	Monroe/ Tompkins (DR) ✓
1824	Edward Coles (DR)	Adolphus Hubbard (DR)	David Blackwell (DR)	James Turney (DR)	Elijah C. Berry (DR)	Abner Field (DR)	DR majority	DR majority	Jesse B. Thomas (DR)	Ninian Edwards (DR)	Daniel Pope; Cook (DR)	2 – Jackson/ Calhoun (DR) ✗ 1 – Adams/ Calhoun (DR) ✓ (Note: Andrew Jackson received two of Illinois's three electoral votes for President while John Quincy Adams received one. John C. Calhoun won all three electoral votes for Vice President.)
1824	Edward Coles (DR)	Adolphus Hubbard (DR)	Morris Birkbeck (DR)	James Turney (DR)	Elijah C. Berry (DR)	Abner Field (DR)	DR majority	DR majority	Jesse B. Thomas (DR)	John McLean (DR)	Daniel Pope; Cook (DR)	2 – Jackson/ Calhoun (DR) ✗ 1 – Adams/ Calhoun (DR) ✓
1825	Edward Coles (DR)	Adolphus Hubbard (DR)	George Forquer (DR)	James Turney (DR)	Elijah C. Berry (DR)	Abner Field (DR)	DR majority	DR majority	Jesse B. Thomas (NR)	Elias Kane (J)	Daniel Pope; Cook (NR)	2 – Jackson/ Calhoun (DR) ✗ 1 – Adams/ Calhoun (DR) ✓
1826	Edward Coles (DR)	Adolphus Hubbard (DR)	George Forquer (DR)	James Turney (DR)	Elijah C. Berry (D)	Abner Field (DR)	D majority	D majority	Jesse B. Thomas (NR)	Elias Kane (J)	Daniel Pope; Cook (NR)	2 – Jackson/ Calhoun (DR) ✗ 1 – Adams/ Calhoun (DR) ✓
1827	Ninian Edwards (DR)	William Kinney (DR)	George Forquer (DR)	James Turney (DR)	Elijah C. Berry (D)	James Hall (D)	D majority	D majority	Jesse B. Thomas (NR)	Elias Kane (J)	Joseph Duncan (J)	2 – Jackson/ Calhoun (DR) ✗ 1 – Adams/ Calhoun (DR) ✓
1828	Ninian Edwards (DR)	William Kinney (DR)	George Forquer (DR)	James Turney (DR)	Elijah C. Berry (D)	James Hall (D)	D majority	D majority	Jesse B. Thomas (NR)	Elias Kane (J)	Joseph Duncan (J)	Jackson/ Calhoun (D) ✓
1829	Ninian Edwards (DR)	William Kinney (DR)	Alexander Pope Field (D)	George Forquer (D)	Elijah C. Berry (D)	James Hall (D)	D majority	D majority	John McLean (J)	Elias Kane (J)	Joseph Duncan (J)	Jackson/ Calhoun (D) ✓
1830	Ninian Edwards (DR)	William Kinney (DR)	Alexander Pope Field (D)	George Forquer (D)	Elijah C. Berry (D)	James Hall (D)	D majority	D majority	John McLean (J)	Elias Kane (J)	Joseph Duncan (J)	Jackson/ Calhoun (D) ✓
1830	Ninian Edwards (DR)	William Kinney (DR)	Alexander Pope Field (D)	George Forquer (D)	Elijah C. Berry (D)	James Hall (D)	D majority	D majority	David J. Baker (J)	Elias Kane (J)	Joseph Duncan (J)	Jackson/ Calhoun (D) ✓
1831	John Reynolds (D) (Note: Resigned following election to United States House of Representatives.)	Zadok Casey (D)	Alexander Pope Field (D)	George Forquer (D)	James T. B. Stapp (D)	John Dement (D)	D majority	D majority	John M. Robinson (J)	Elias Kane (J)	Joseph Duncan (J)	Jackson/ Calhoun (D) ✓
1832	John Reynolds (D)	Zadok Casey (D)	Alexander Pope Field (D)	George Forquer (D)	James T. B. Stapp (D)	John Dement (D)	D majority	D majority	John M. Robinson (J)	Elias Kane (J)	Joseph Duncan (J)	Jackson/ Van Buren (D) ✓
1833	John Reynolds (D)	Zadok Casey (D)	Alexander Pope Field (D)	James Semple (D)	James T. B. Stapp (D)	John Dement (D)	D majority	D majority	John M. Robinson (J)	Elias Kane (J)	3J	Jackson/ Van Buren (D) ✓
1833	John Reynolds (D)	William Lee D. Ewing (D)	Alexander Pope Field (D)	James Semple (D)	James T. B. Stapp (D)	John Dement (D)	D majority	D majority	John M. Robinson (J)	Elias Kane (J)	3J	Jackson/ Van Buren (D) ✓
1834	John Reynolds (D)	William Lee D. Ewing (D)	Alexander Pope Field (D)	Ninian Wirt Edwards (D)	James T. B. Stapp (D)	John Dement (D)	D majority	D majority	John M. Robinson (J)	Elias Kane (J)	3J	Jackson/ Van Buren (D) ✓
1834	W. L. D. Ewing (D) (Note: As acting lieutenant governor, filled unexpired term.)	vacant	Alexander Pope Field (D)	Ninian Wirt Edwards (D)	James T. B. Stapp (D)	John Dement (D)	D majority	D majority	John M. Robinson (J)	Elias Kane (J)	3J	Jackson/ Van Buren (D) ✓
1835	Joseph Duncan (D)	Alexander M. Jenkins (D) (Note: Resigned.)	Alexander Pope Field (D)	Jesse B. Thomas Jr. (D)	Levi Davis (W)	John Dement (D)	D majority	D majority	John M. Robinson (J)	Elias Kane (J)	3J	Jackson/ Van Buren (D) ✓
1836	Joseph Duncan (D)	Alexander M. Jenkins (D)	Alexander Pope Field (D)	Walter B. Scates (D)	Levi Davis (W)	Charles Gregory (D)	D majority	D majority	John M. Robinson (J)	W. L. D. Ewing (J)	3J	Van Buren/ Johnson (D) ✓
1837	Joseph Duncan (D)	William H. Davidson (D)	Alexander Pope Field (D)	Usher F. Linder (D)	Levi Davis (W)	John D. Whiteside (D)	22D, 18W	57D, 24W, 10?	John M. Robinson (D)	Richard M. Young (D)	3D	Van Buren/ Johnson (D) ✓
1838	Joseph Duncan (D)	William H. Davidson (D)	Alexander Pope Field (D)	George W. Olney (D)	Levi Davis (W)	John D. Whiteside (D)	22D, 18W	57D, 24W, 10?	John M. Robinson (D)	Richard M. Young (D)	3D	Van Buren/ Johnson (D) ✓
1839	Thomas Carlin (D)	Stinson Anderson (D)	Alexander Pope Field (D)	Wickliffe Kitchell (D)	Levi Davis (W)	John D. Whiteside (D)	20D, 20W (Note: Lt. Gov. Stinson Anderson provided the tie-breaking vote to allow the Democrats to organize and run the chamber.)	46W, 40D, 5I (Note: Elected a Democrat, William Lee D. Ewing, as a minority-party Speaker.)	John M. Robinson (D)	Richard M. Young (D)	2D, 1W	Van Buren/ Johnson (D) ✓
1840	Thomas Carlin (D)	Stinson Anderson (D)	Alexander Pope Field (D)	Josiah Lamborn (D)	Levi Davis (W)	John D. Whiteside (D)	20D, 20W	46W, 40D, 5I	John M. Robinson (D)	Richard M. Young (D)	2D, 1W	Van Buren/ Johnson (D) ✗
1840	Thomas Carlin (D)	Stinson Anderson (D)	Stephen Douglas (D)	Josiah Lamborn (D)	Levi Davis (W)	John D. Whiteside (D)	20D, 20W	46W, 40D, 5I	John M. Robinson (D)	Richard M. Young (D)	2D, 1W	Van Buren/ Johnson (D) ✗
1841	Thomas Carlin (D)	Stinson Anderson (D)	Lyman Trumbull (D)	Josiah Lamborn (D)	James Shields (D)	Milton Carpenter (D)	26D, 14W	51D, 40W	Samuel McRoberts (D)	Richard M. Young (D)	1D, 1ID, 1W	Van Buren/ Johnson (D) ✗
1842	Thomas Carlin (D)	Stinson Anderson (D)	Lyman Trumbull (D)	Josiah Lamborn (D)	James Shields (D)	Milton Carpenter (D)	26D, 14W	51D, 40W	Samuel McRoberts (D)	Richard M. Young (D)	1D, 1ID, 1W	Van Buren/ Johnson (D) ✗
1843	Thomas Ford (D)	John Moore (D)	Thompson Campbell (D)	James A. McDougall (D)	W. L. D. Ewing (D)	Milton Carpenter (D)	30D, 12W	84D, 37W	Samuel McRoberts (D)	Sidney Breese (D)	6D, 1W	Van Buren/ Johnson (D) ✗
1843	Thomas Ford (D)	John Moore (D)	Thompson Campbell (D)	James A. McDougall (D)	W. L. D. Ewing (D)	Milton Carpenter (D)	30D, 12W	84D, 37W	James Semple (D)	Sidney Breese (D)	6D, 1W	Van Buren/ Johnson (D) ✗
1844	Thomas Ford (D)	John Moore (D)	Thompson Campbell (D)	James A. McDougall (D)	W. L. D. Ewing (D)	Milton Carpenter (D)	30D, 12W	84D, 37W	James Semple (D)	Sidney Breese (D)	6D, 1W	Polk/ Dallas (D) ✓
1845	Thomas Ford (D)	John Moore (D)	Thompson Campbell (D)	James A. McDougall (D)	W. L. D. Ewing (D)	Milton Carpenter (D)	26D, 15W	78D, 40W, 3?	James Semple (D)	Sidney Breese (D)	6D, 1W	Polk/ Dallas (D) ✓
1846	Thomas Ford (D)	John Moore (D)	Thompson Campbell (D)	David B. Campbell (D)	Thomas H. Campbell (D)	Milton Carpenter (D)	26D, 15W	78D, 40W, 3?	James Semple (D)	Sidney Breese (D)	6D, 1W	Polk/ Dallas (D) ✓
1847	Augustus C. French (D)	Joseph Wells (D)	Horace S. Cooley (D)	David B. Campbell (D)	Thomas H. Campbell (D)	Milton Carpenter (D)	29D, 12W	76D, 44W, 3?	Stephen Douglas (D)	Sidney Breese (D)	6D, 1W	Polk/ Dallas (D) ✓
1848	Augustus C. French (D)	Joseph Wells (D)	Horace S. Cooley (D)	office abolished 1848–1867	Thomas H. Campbell (D)	John Moore (D)	29D, 12W	76D, 44W, 3?	Stephen Douglas (D)	Sidney Breese (D)	6D, 1W	Cass/ Butler (D) ✗
1849	Augustus C. French (D)	William McMurtry (D)	Horace S. Cooley (D)	office abolished 1848–1867	Thomas H. Campbell (D)	John Moore (D)	17D, 7W, 1?	54D, 21W	Stephen Douglas (D)	James Shields (D)	6D, 1W	Cass/ Butler (D) ✗
1850	Augustus C. French (D)	William McMurtry (D)	David L. Gregg (D)	office abolished 1848–1867	Thomas H. Campbell (D)	John Moore (D)	17D, 7W, 1?	54D, 21W	Stephen Douglas (D)	James Shields (D)	6D, 1W	Cass/ Butler (D) ✗
1851	Augustus C. French (D)	William McMurtry (D)	David L. Gregg (D)	office abolished 1848–1867	Thomas H. Campbell (D)	John Moore (D)	17D, 8W	46D, 29W	Stephen Douglas (D)	James Shields (D)	6D, 1W	Cass/ Butler (D) ✗
1852	Augustus C. French (D)	William McMurtry (D)	David L. Gregg (D)	office abolished 1848–1867	Thomas H. Campbell (D)	John Moore (D)	17D, 8W	46D, 29W	Stephen Douglas (D)	James Shields (D)	6D, 1W	Pierce/ King (D) ✓
1853	Joel Aldrich Matteson (D)	Gustav Koerner (D)	Alexander Starne (D)	office abolished 1848–1867	Thomas H. Campbell (D)	John Moore (D)	20D, 5W	56D, 18W, 1FS	Stephen Douglas (D)	James Shields (D)	5D, 4W	Pierce/ King (D) ✓
1854	Joel Aldrich Matteson (D)	Gustav Koerner (D)	Alexander Starne (D)	office abolished 1848–1867	Thomas H. Campbell (D)	John Moore (D)	20D, 5W	56D, 18W, 1FS	Stephen Douglas (D)	James Shields (D)	5D, 4W	Pierce/ King (D) ✓
1855	Joel Aldrich Matteson (D)	Gustav Koerner (D)	Alexander Starne (D)	office abolished 1848–1867	Thomas H. Campbell (D)	John Moore (D)	14D, 11W	41W, 34D (Note: An Anti-Nebraska Democrat, Thomas J. Turner, was elected in coalition with the Whigs to be a minority-party Speaker.)	Stephen Douglas (D)	Lyman Trumbull (D)	5D, 2O, 2R	Pierce/ King (D) ✓
1856	Joel Aldrich Matteson (D)	Gustav Koerner (D)	Alexander Starne (D)	office abolished 1848–1867	Thomas H. Campbell (D)	John Moore (D)	14D, 11W	41W, 34D	Stephen Douglas (D)	Lyman Trumbull (D)	5D, 2O, 2R	Buchanan/ Breckinridge (D) ✓
1857	William Henry Bissell (R) (Note: Died in office.)	John Wood (R)	Ozias M. Hatch (R)	office abolished 1848–1867	Jesse K. Dubois (R)	James Miller (R)	13D, 12R	55D, 30R	Stephen Douglas (D)	Lyman Trumbull (R)	5D, 4R	Buchanan/ Breckinridge (D) ✓
1858	William Henry Bissell (R)	John Wood (R)	Ozias M. Hatch (R)	office abolished 1848–1867	Jesse K. Dubois (R)	James Miller (R)	13D, 12R	55D, 30R	Stephen Douglas (D)	Lyman Trumbull (R)	5D, 4R	Buchanan/ Breckinridge (D) ✓
1859	William Henry Bissell (R)	John Wood (R)	Ozias M. Hatch (R)	office abolished 1848–1867	Jesse K. Dubois (R)	James Miller (R)	14D, 11R	40D, 35R	Stephen Douglas (D)	Lyman Trumbull (R)	5D, 4R	Buchanan/ Breckinridge (D) ✓
1860	William Henry Bissell (R)	John Wood (R)	Ozias M. Hatch (R)	office abolished 1848–1867	Jesse K. Dubois (R)	James Miller (R)	14D, 11R	40D, 35R	Stephen Douglas (D)	Lyman Trumbull (R)	5D, 4R	Lincoln/ Hamlin (R) ✓
1860	John Wood (R) (Note: As lieutenant governor, filled unexpired term.)	Thomas Marshall (D)	Ozias M. Hatch (R)	office abolished 1848–1867	Jesse K. Dubois (R)	James Miller (R)	14D, 11R	40D, 35R	Stephen Douglas (D)	Lyman Trumbull (R)	5D, 4R	Lincoln/ Hamlin (R) ✓
1861	Richard Yates (R)	Francis Hoffmann (R)	Ozias M. Hatch (R)	office abolished 1848–1867	Jesse K. Dubois (R)	William Butler (R)	13R, 12D	41R, 34D	Stephen Douglas (D)	Lyman Trumbull (R)	5D, 4R	Lincoln/ Hamlin (R) ✓
1861	Richard Yates (R)	Francis Hoffmann (R)	Ozias M. Hatch (R)	office abolished 1848–1867	Jesse K. Dubois (R)	William Butler (R)	13R, 12D	41R, 34D	Orville H. Browning (R)	Lyman Trumbull (R)	5D, 4R	Lincoln/ Hamlin (R) ✓
1862	Richard Yates (R)	Francis Hoffmann (R)	Ozias M. Hatch (R)	office abolished 1848–1867	Jesse K. Dubois (R)	William Butler (R)	13R, 12D	41R, 34D	Orville H. Browning (R)	Lyman Trumbull (R)	5D, 4R	Lincoln/ Hamlin (R) ✓
1863	Richard Yates (R)	Francis Hoffmann (R)	Ozias M. Hatch (R)	office abolished 1848–1867	Jesse K. Dubois (R)	Alexander Starne (D)	13D, 12R	55D, 30R	William Richardson (D)	Lyman Trumbull (R)	9D, 5R	Lincoln/ Hamlin (R) ✓
1864	Richard Yates (R)	Francis Hoffmann (R)	Ozias M. Hatch (R)	office abolished 1848–1867	Jesse K. Dubois (R)	Alexander Starne (D)	13D, 12R	55D, 30R	William Richardson (D)	Lyman Trumbull (R)	9D, 5R	Lincoln/ Johnson (NU) ✓
1865	Richard J. Oglesby (R)	William Bross (R)	Sharon Tyndale (R)	office abolished 1848–1867	Orlin H. Miner (R)	James H. Beveridge (R)	14R, 11D	51R, 34D	Richard Yates (R)	Lyman Trumbull (R)	11R, 3D	Lincoln/ Johnson (NU) ✓
1866	Richard J. Oglesby (R)	William Bross (R)	Sharon Tyndale (R)	office abolished 1848–1867	Orlin H. Miner (R)	James H. Beveridge (R)	14R, 11D	51R, 34D	Richard Yates (R)	Lyman Trumbull (R)	11R, 3D	Lincoln/ Johnson (NU) ✓
1867	Richard J. Oglesby (R)	William Bross (R)	Sharon Tyndale (R)	Robert G. Ingersoll (R)	Orlin H. Miner (R)	George W. Smith (R)	16R, 9D	60R, 25D	Richard Yates (R)	Lyman Trumbull (R)	11R, 3D	Lincoln/ Johnson (NU) ✓
1868	Richard J. Oglesby (R)	William Bross (R)	Sharon Tyndale (R)	Robert G. Ingersoll (R)	Orlin H. Miner (R)	George W. Smith (R)	16R, 9D	60R, 25D	Richard Yates (R)	Lyman Trumbull (R)	11R, 3D	Grant/ Colfax (R) ✓
1869	John M. Palmer (R)	John Dougherty (R)	Edward Rummel (R)	Washington Bushnell (R)	Charles E. Lippincott (R)	Erastus Newton Bates (R)	18R, 7D	58R, 27D	Richard Yates (R)	Lyman Trumbull (R)	10R, 4D	Grant/ Colfax (R) ✓
1870	John M. Palmer (R)	John Dougherty (R)	Edward Rummel (R)	Washington Bushnell (R)	Charles E. Lippincott (R)	Erastus Newton Bates (R)	18R, 7D	58R, 27D	Richard Yates (R)	Lyman Trumbull (R)	10R, 4D	Grant/ Colfax (R) ✓
1871	John M. Palmer (R)	John Dougherty (R)	Edward Rummel (R)	Washington Bushnell (R)	Charles E. Lippincott (R)	Erastus Newton Bates (R)	30R, 20D	98R, 76D, 1I	John A. Logan (R)	Lyman Trumbull (LR)	8R, 6D	Grant/ Colfax (R) ✓
1872	John M. Palmer (R)	John Dougherty (R)	Edward Rummel (R)	Washington Bushnell (R)	Charles E. Lippincott (R)	Erastus Newton Bates (R)	30R, 20D	98R, 76D, 1I	John A. Logan (R)	Lyman Trumbull (LR)	8R, 6D	Grant/ Wilson (R) ✓
1873	Richard J. Oglesby (R) (Note: Resigned so that Lieutenant Governor John Lourie Beveridge, acting as governor, would appoint him to the United States Senate.)	John Lourie Beveridge (R)	George H. Harlow (R)	James K. Edsall (R)	Charles E. Lippincott (R)	Edward Rutz (R)	33R, 18D (Note: Due to the ascension of Lt. Gov. Beveridge to the Governorship after Gov. Oglesby took a U.S. Senate seat, the President Pro Tempore elected by the Senate, John Early, became acting Lt. Governor.)	86R, 67D	John A. Logan (R)	Richard J. Oglesby (R)	14R, 5D	Grant/ Wilson (R) ✓
1873	John Lourie Beveridge (R)	John Early (R)	George H. Harlow (R)	James K. Edsall (R)	Charles E. Lippincott (R)	Edward Rutz (R)	33R, 18D	86R, 67D	John A. Logan (R)	Richard J. Oglesby (R)	14R, 5D	Grant/ Wilson (R) ✓
1874	John Lourie Beveridge (R)	John Early (R)	George H. Harlow (R)	James K. Edsall (R)	Charles E. Lippincott (R)	Edward Rutz (R)	33R, 18D	86R, 67D	John A. Logan (R)	Richard J. Oglesby (R)	14R, 5D	Grant/ Wilson (R) ✓
1875	John Lourie Beveridge (R)	Archibald A. Glenn (D)	George H. Harlow (R)	James K. Edsall (R)	Charles E. Lippincott (R)	Thomas S. Ridgway (R)	24R, 18D, 9I (Note: A coalition of Democrats and Independents organized the Senate, and chose Archibald A. Glenn, a Democrat, to be President Pro Tempore. Due to the vacancy in the Lt. Governorship from John Beveridge ascending to be Governor in 1873, Glenn also became acting Lt. Governor.)	69R, 42D, 41I (Note: A coalition of Democrats and Independents organized the House, and chose Elijah Haines, an Independent, to be Speaker.)	John A. Logan (R)	Richard J. Oglesby (R)	10D, 7R, 2I	Grant/ Wilson (R) ✓
1876	John Lourie Beveridge (R)	Archibald A. Glenn (D)	George H. Harlow (R)	James K. Edsall (R)	Charles E. Lippincott (R)	Thomas S. Ridgway (R)	24R, 18D, 9I	69R, 42D, 41I	John A. Logan (R)	Richard J. Oglesby (R)	11D, 6R, 2I	Hayes/ Wheeler (R) ✓
1877	Shelby M. Cullom (R) (Note: Resigned to take an elected seat in the United States Senate.)	Andrew Shuman (R)	George H. Harlow (R)	James K. Edsall (R)	Thomas B. Needles (R)	Edward Rutz (R)	22D, 21R, 8I (Note: A coalition of Democrats and Independents organized the Senate, and chose Fawcett Plumb, an independent tied to the Farmers' Association, to be President Pro Tempore.)	79R, 67D, 7I	David Davis (I)	Richard J. Oglesby (R)	12R, 7D	Hayes/ Wheeler (R) ✓
1878	Shelby M. Cullom (R)	Andrew Shuman (R)	George H. Harlow (R)	James K. Edsall (R)	Thomas B. Needles (R)	Edward Rutz (R)	22D, 21R, 8I	79R, 67D, 7I	David Davis (I)	Richard J. Oglesby (R)	12R, 7D	Hayes/ Wheeler (R) ✓
1879	Shelby M. Cullom (R)	Andrew Shuman (R)	George H. Harlow (R)	James K. Edsall (R)	Thomas B. Needles (R)	John C. Smith (R)	26R, 24D, 1I	80R, 60D, 10GB, 3Soc	David Davis (I)	John A. Logan (R)	12R, 6D, 1GB	Hayes/ Wheeler (R) ✓
1880	Shelby M. Cullom (R)	Andrew Shuman (R)	George H. Harlow (R)	James K. Edsall (R)	Thomas B. Needles (R)	John C. Smith (R)	26R, 24D, 1I	80R, 60D, 10GB, 3Soc	David Davis (I)	John A. Logan (R)	12R, 6D, 1GB	Garfield/ Arthur (R) ✓
1881	Shelby M. Cullom (R)	John Marshall Hamilton (R)	Henry D. Dement (R)	James McCartney (R)	Charles Philip Swigert (R)	Edward Rutz (R)	32R, 18D, 1Soc	82R, 71D	David Davis (I)	John A. Logan (R)	13R, 6D	Garfield/ Arthur (R) ✓
1882	Shelby M. Cullom (R)	John Marshall Hamilton (R)	Henry D. Dement (R)	James McCartney (R)	Charles Philip Swigert (R)	Edward Rutz (R)	32R, 18D, 1Soc	82R, 71D	David Davis (I)	John A. Logan (R)	13R, 6D	Garfield/ Arthur (R) ✓
1883	John Marshall Hamilton (R)	William James Campbell (R)	Henry D. Dement (R)	James McCartney (R)	Charles Philip Swigert (R)	John C. Smith (R)	31R, 20D	77R, 75D, 1I	Shelby M. Cullom (R)	John A. Logan (R)	11R, 8D, 1ID	Garfield/ Arthur (R) ✓
1884	John Marshall Hamilton (R)	William James Campbell (R)	Henry D. Dement (R)	James McCartney (R)	Charles Philip Swigert (R)	John C. Smith (R)	31R, 20D	77R, 75D, 1I	Shelby M. Cullom (R)	John A. Logan (R)	11R, 8D, 1ID	Blaine/ Logan (R) ✗
1885	Richard J. Oglesby (R)	John C. Smith (R)	Henry D. Dement (R)	George Hunt (R)	Charles Philip Swigert (R)	Jacob Gross (R)	26R, 25D	76D, 76R, 1I (Note: The Independent, Elijah Haines, was elected Speaker with Democratic support, giving them control.)	Shelby M. Cullom (R)	John A. Logan (R)	10D, 10R	Blaine/ Logan (R) ✗
1886	Richard J. Oglesby (R)	John C. Smith (R)	Henry D. Dement (R)	George Hunt (R)	Charles Philip Swigert (R)	Jacob Gross (R)	26R, 25D	76D, 76R, 1I	Shelby M. Cullom (R)	John A. Logan (R)	10D, 10R	Blaine/ Logan (R) ✗
1887	Richard J. Oglesby (R)	John C. Smith (R)	Henry D. Dement (R)	George Hunt (R)	Charles Philip Swigert (R)	John R. Tanner (R)	33R, 18D	92R, 61D	Shelby M. Cullom (R)	Charles B. Farwell (R)	14R, 6D	Blaine/ Logan (R) ✗
1888	Richard J. Oglesby (R)	John C. Smith (R)	Henry D. Dement (R)	George Hunt (R)	Charles Philip Swigert (R)	John R. Tanner (R)	33R, 18D	92R, 61D	Shelby M. Cullom (R)	Charles B. Farwell (R)	14R, 6D	Harrison/ Morton (R) ✓
1889	Joseph W. Fifer (R)	Lyman Beecher Ray (R)	Isaac N. Pearson (R)	George Hunt (R)	Charles W. Pavey (R)	Charles Becker (R)	33R, 18D	92R, 61D	Shelby M. Cullom (R)	Charles B. Farwell (R)	13R, 7D	Harrison/ Morton (R) ✓
1890	Joseph W. Fifer (R)	Lyman Beecher Ray (R)	Isaac N. Pearson (R)	George Hunt (R)	Charles W. Pavey (R)	Charles Becker (R)	33R, 18D	92R, 61D	Shelby M. Cullom (R)	Charles B. Farwell (R)	13R, 7D	Harrison/ Morton (R) ✓
1891	Joseph W. Fifer (R)	Lyman Beecher Ray (R)	Isaac N. Pearson (R)	George Hunt (R)	Charles W. Pavey (R)	Edward S. Wilson (D)	27R, 24D	77D, 73R, 3FA	Shelby M. Cullom (R)	John M. Palmer (D)	14D, 6R	Harrison/ Morton (R) ✓
1892	Joseph W. Fifer (R)	Lyman Beecher Ray (R)	Isaac N. Pearson (R)	George Hunt (R)	Charles W. Pavey (R)	Edward S. Wilson (D)	27R, 24D	77D, 73R, 3FA	Shelby M. Cullom (R)	John M. Palmer (D)	14D, 6R	Cleveland/ Stevenson (D) ✓
1893	John Peter Altgeld (D)	Joseph B. Gill (D)	William H. Hinrichsen (D)	Maurice T. Moloney (D)	David Gore (D)	Rufus N. Ramsay (D)	29D, 22R	78D, 75R	Shelby M. Cullom (R)	John M. Palmer (D)	11D, 11R	Cleveland/ Stevenson (D) ✓
1894	John Peter Altgeld (D)	Joseph B. Gill (D)	William H. Hinrichsen (D)	Maurice T. Moloney (D)	David Gore (D)	Rufus N. Ramsay (D)	29D, 22R	78D, 75R	Shelby M. Cullom (R)	John M. Palmer (D)	11D, 11R	Cleveland/ Stevenson (D) ✓
1895	John Peter Altgeld (D)	Joseph B. Gill (D)	William H. Hinrichsen (D)	Maurice T. Moloney (D)	David Gore (D)	Henry Wulff (R)	33R, 18D	92R, 61D	Shelby M. Cullom (R)	John M. Palmer (D)	20R, 2D	Cleveland/ Stevenson (D) ✓
1896	John Peter Altgeld (D)	Joseph B. Gill (D)	William H. Hinrichsen (D)	Maurice T. Moloney (D)	David Gore (D)	Henry Wulff (R)	33R, 18D	92R, 61D	Shelby M. Cullom (R)	John M. Palmer (D)	22R	McKinley/ Hobart (R) ✓
1897	John R. Tanner (R)	William Northcott (R)	James A. Rose (R)	Edward C. Akin (R)	James S. McCullough (R)	Henry L. Hertz (R)	39R, 11D, 1Pop	89R, 62D, 2Pop	Shelby M. Cullom (R)	William E. Mason (R)	17R, 5D	McKinley/ Hobart (R) ✓
1898	John R. Tanner (R)	William Northcott (R)	James A. Rose (R)	Edward C. Akin (R)	James S. McCullough (R)	Henry L. Hertz (R)	39R, 11D, 1Pop	89R, 62D, 2Pop	Shelby M. Cullom (R)	William E. Mason (R)	17R, 5D	McKinley/ Hobart (R) ✓
1899	John R. Tanner (R)	William Northcott (R)	James A. Rose (R)	Edward C. Akin (R)	James S. McCullough (R)	Floyd K. Whittemore (R)	34R, 16D, 1Pop	81R, 71D, 1Proh	Shelby M. Cullom (R)	William E. Mason (R)	14R, 8D	McKinley/ Hobart (R) ✓
1900	John R. Tanner (R)	William Northcott (R)	James A. Rose (R)	Edward C. Akin (R)	James S. McCullough (R)	Floyd K. Whittemore (R)	34R, 16D, 1Pop	81R, 71D, 1Proh	Shelby M. Cullom (R)	William E. Mason (R)	14R, 8D	McKinley/ Roosevelt (R) ✓
1901	Richard Yates Jr. (R)	William Northcott (R)	James A. Rose (R)	Howland J. Hamlin (R)	James S. McCullough (R)	Moses O. Williamson (R)	32R, 19D	81R, 72D	Shelby M. Cullom (R)	William E. Mason (R)	11D, 11R	McKinley/ Roosevelt (R) ✓
1902	Richard Yates Jr. (R)	William Northcott (R)	James A. Rose (R)	Howland J. Hamlin (R)	James S. McCullough (R)	Moses O. Williamson (R)	32R, 19D	81R, 72D	Shelby M. Cullom (R)	William E. Mason (R)	11D, 11R	McKinley/ Roosevelt (R) ✓
1903	Richard Yates Jr. (R)	William Northcott (R)	James A. Rose (R)	Howland J. Hamlin (R)	James S. McCullough (R)	Fred A. Busse (R)	36R, 15D	88R, 62D, 2PO, 1Proh	Shelby M. Cullom (R)	Albert J. Hopkins (R)	17R, 8D	McKinley/ Roosevelt (R) ✓
1904	Richard Yates Jr. (R)	William Northcott (R)	James A. Rose (R)	Howland J. Hamlin (R)	James S. McCullough (R)	Fred A. Busse (R)	36R, 15D	88R, 62D, 2PO, 1Proh	Shelby M. Cullom (R)	Albert J. Hopkins (R)	17R, 8D	Roosevelt/ Fairbanks (R) ✓
1905	Charles S. Deneen (R)	Lawrence Y. Sherman (R)	James A. Rose (R)	William H. Stead (R)	James S. McCullough (R)	Len Small (R)	41R, 10D	91R, 57D, 3Proh, 2Soc	Shelby M. Cullom (R)	Albert J. Hopkins (R)	24R, 1D	Roosevelt/ Fairbanks (R) ✓
1906	Charles S. Deneen (R)	Lawrence Y. Sherman (R)	James A. Rose (R)	William H. Stead (R)	James S. McCullough (R)	Len Small (R)	41R, 10D	91R, 57D, 3Proh, 2Soc	Shelby M. Cullom (R)	Albert J. Hopkins (R)	24R, 1D	Roosevelt/ Fairbanks (R) ✓
1907	Charles S. Deneen (R)	Lawrence Y. Sherman (R)	James A. Rose (R)	William H. Stead (R)	James S. McCullough (R)	John F. Smulski (R)	44R, 7D	90R, 60D, 3Proh	Shelby M. Cullom (R)	Albert J. Hopkins (R)	20R, 5D	Roosevelt/ Fairbanks (R) ✓
1908	Charles S. Deneen (R)	Lawrence Y. Sherman (R)	James A. Rose (R)	William H. Stead (R)	James S. McCullough (R)	John F. Smulski (R)	44R, 7D	90R, 60D, 3Proh	Shelby M. Cullom (R)	Albert J. Hopkins (R)	20R, 5D	Taft/ Sherman (R) ✓
1909	Charles S. Deneen (R)	John G. Oglesby (R)	James A. Rose (R)	William H. Stead (R)	James S. McCullough (R)	Andrew Russel (R)	38R, 13D	88R, 65D	Shelby M. Cullom (R)	William Lorimer (R)	19R, 6D	Taft/ Sherman (R) ✓
1910	Charles S. Deneen (R)	John G. Oglesby (R)	James A. Rose (R)	William H. Stead (R)	James S. McCullough (R)	Andrew Russel (R)	38R, 13D	88R, 65D	Shelby M. Cullom (R)	William Lorimer (R)	19R, 6D	Taft/ Sherman (R) ✓
1911	Charles S. Deneen (R)	John G. Oglesby (R)	James A. Rose (R)	William H. Stead (R)	James S. McCullough (R)	Edward E. Mitchell (R)	34R, 17D	82R, 68D, 2I, 1Proh	Shelby M. Cullom (R)	William Lorimer (R)	14R, 11D	Taft/ Sherman (R) ✓
1912	Charles S. Deneen (R)	John G. Oglesby (R)	Cornelius Doyle (R)	William H. Stead (R)	James S. McCullough (R)	Edward E. Mitchell (R)	34R, 17D	82R, 68D, 2I, 1Proh	Shelby M. Cullom (R)	William Lorimer (R)	14R, 11D	Wilson/ Marshall (D) ✓
1913	Edward F. Dunne (D)	Barratt O'Hara (D)	Harry Woods (D)	Patrick J. Lucey (D)	James J. Brady (D)	William F. Ryan Jr. (D)	25R, 24D, 2Prog (Note: With the support of the Progressive members, the Democrats named the President Pro Tempore and controlled the chamber.)	71D, 52R, 27Prog, 3Soc (Note: After 76 ballots, a Democrat, William B. McKinley, was elected Speaker with Republican votes.)	J. Hamilton Lewis (D)	Lawrence Y. Sherman (R)	20D, 5R, 2Prog	Wilson/ Marshall (D) ✓
1914	Edward F. Dunne (D)	Barratt O'Hara (D)	Harry Woods (D)	Patrick J. Lucey (D)	James J. Brady (D)	William F. Ryan Jr. (D)	25R, 24D, 2Prog	71D, 52R, 27Prog, 3Soc	J. Hamilton Lewis (D)	Lawrence Y. Sherman (R)	20D, 5R, 2Prog	Wilson/ Marshall (D) ✓
1915	Edward F. Dunne (D)	Barratt O'Hara (D)	Lewis Stevenson (D)	Patrick J. Lucey (D)	James J. Brady (D)	Andrew Russel (R)	25D, 25R, 1Prog (Note: With the support of the Progressive member, the Democrats named the President Pro Tempore and controlled the chamber.)	79R, 70D, 2Soc, 1I, 1Prog	J. Hamilton Lewis (D)	Lawrence Y. Sherman (R)	16R, 10D, 1Prog	Wilson/ Marshall (D) ✓
1916	Edward F. Dunne (D)	Barratt O'Hara (D)	Lewis Stevenson (D)	Patrick J. Lucey (D)	James J. Brady (D)	Andrew Russel (R)	25D, 25R, 1Prog	79R, 70D, 2Soc, 1I, 1Prog	J. Hamilton Lewis (D)	Lawrence Y. Sherman (R)	16R, 10D, 1Prog	Hughes/ Fairbanks (R) ✗
1917	Frank O. Lowden (R)	John G. Oglesby (R)	Louis L. Emmerson (R)	Edward Brundage (R)	Andrew Russel (R)	Len Small (R)	33R, 18D	85R, 67D, 1I	J. Hamilton Lewis (D)	Lawrence Y. Sherman (R)	21R, 6D	Hughes/ Fairbanks (R) ✗
1918	Frank O. Lowden (R)	John G. Oglesby (R)	Louis L. Emmerson (R)	Edward Brundage (R)	Andrew Russel (R)	Len Small (R)	33R, 18D	85R, 67D, 1I	J. Hamilton Lewis (D)	Lawrence Y. Sherman (R)	21R, 6D	Hughes/ Fairbanks (R) ✗
1919	Frank O. Lowden (R)	John G. Oglesby (R)	Louis L. Emmerson (R)	Edward Brundage (R)	Andrew Russel (R)	Fred E. Sterling (R)	34R, 17D	90R, 63D	Medill McCormick (R)	Lawrence Y. Sherman (R)	22R, 5D	Hughes/ Fairbanks (R) ✗
1920	Frank O. Lowden (R)	John G. Oglesby (R)	Louis L. Emmerson (R)	Edward Brundage (R)	Andrew Russel (R)	Fred E. Sterling (R)	34R, 17D	90R, 63D	Medill McCormick (R)	Lawrence Y. Sherman (R)	22R, 5D	Harding/ Coolidge (R) ✓
1921	Len Small (R)	Fred E. Sterling (R)	Louis L. Emmerson (R)	Edward Brundage (R)	Andrew Russel (R)	Edward E. Miller (R)	43R, 8D	95R, 58D	Medill McCormick (R)	William B. McKinley (R)	24R, 3D	Harding/ Coolidge (R) ✓
1922	Len Small (R)	Fred E. Sterling (R)	Louis L. Emmerson (R)	Edward Brundage (R)	Andrew Russel (R)	Edward E. Miller (R)	43R, 8D	95R, 58D	Medill McCormick (R)	William B. McKinley (R)	24R, 3D	Harding/ Coolidge (R) ✓
1923	Len Small (R)	Fred E. Sterling (R)	Louis L. Emmerson (R)	Edward Brundage (R)	Andrew Russel (R)	Oscar Nelson (R)	42R, 9D	89R, 63D, 1I	Medill McCormick (R)	William B. McKinley (R)	20R, 7D	Harding/ Coolidge (R) ✓
1924	Len Small (R)	Fred E. Sterling (R)	Louis L. Emmerson (R)	Edward Brundage (R)	Andrew Russel (R)	Oscar Nelson (R)	42R, 9D	89R, 63D, 1I	Medill McCormick (R)	William B. McKinley (R)	20R, 7D	Coolidge/ Dawes (R) ✓
1925	Len Small (R)	Fred E. Sterling (R)	Louis L. Emmerson (R)	Oscar E. Carlstrom (R)	Oscar Nelson (R)	Omer N. Custer (R)	38R, 13D	94R, 59D	Charles S. Deneen (R)	William B. McKinley (R)	22R, 5D	Coolidge/ Dawes (R) ✓
1926	Len Small (R)	Fred E. Sterling (R)	Louis L. Emmerson (R)	Oscar E. Carlstrom (R)	Oscar Nelson (R)	Omer N. Custer (R)	38R, 13D	94R, 59D	Charles S. Deneen (R)	William B. McKinley (R)	22R, 5D	Coolidge/ Dawes (R) ✓
1927	Len Small (R)	Fred E. Sterling (R)	Louis L. Emmerson (R)	Oscar E. Carlstrom (R)	Oscar Nelson (R)	Garrett D. Kinney (R)	41R, 10D	93R, 60D	Charles S. Deneen (R)	vacant	20R, 7D	Coolidge/ Dawes (R) ✓
1928	Len Small (R)	Fred E. Sterling (R)	Louis L. Emmerson (R)	Oscar E. Carlstrom (R)	Oscar Nelson (R)	Garrett D. Kinney (R)	41R, 10D	93R, 60D	Charles S. Deneen (R)	Otis F. Glenn (R)	20R, 7D	Hoover/ Curtis (R) ✓
1929	Louis L. Emmerson (R)	Fred E. Sterling (R)	William J. Stratton (R)	Oscar E. Carlstrom (R)	Oscar Nelson (R)	Omer N. Custer (R)	40R, 11D	91R, 62D	Charles S. Deneen (R)	Otis F. Glenn (R)	21R, 6D	Hoover/ Curtis (R) ✓
1930	Louis L. Emmerson (R)	Fred E. Sterling (R)	William J. Stratton (R)	Oscar E. Carlstrom (R)	Oscar Nelson (R)	Omer N. Custer (R)	40R, 11D	91R, 62D	Charles S. Deneen (R)	Otis F. Glenn (R)	21R, 6D	Hoover/ Curtis (R) ✓
1931	Louis L. Emmerson (R)	Fred E. Sterling (R)	William J. Stratton (R)	Oscar E. Carlstrom (R)	Oscar Nelson (R)	Edward Barrett (D)	33R, 18D	81R, 72D	J. Hamilton Lewis (D)	Otis F. Glenn (R)	15R, 12D	Hoover/ Curtis (R) ✓
1932	Louis L. Emmerson (R)	Fred E. Sterling (R)	William J. Stratton (R)	Oscar E. Carlstrom (R)	Oscar Nelson (R)	Edward Barrett (D)	33R, 18D	81R, 72D	J. Hamilton Lewis (D)	Otis F. Glenn (R)	14R, 13D	Roosevelt/ Garner (D) ✓
1933	Henry Horner (D)	Thomas Donovan (D)	Edward J. Hughes (D)	Otto Kerner Sr. (D) (Note: Resigned to take seat on the United States Court of Appeals for the Seventh Circuit.)	Edward Barrett (D)	John C. Martin (D)	33D, 18R	80D, 73R	J. Hamilton Lewis (D)	William H. Dieterich (D)	19D, 8R	Roosevelt/ Garner (D) ✓
1934	Henry Horner (D)	Thomas Donovan (D)	Edward J. Hughes (D)	Otto Kerner Sr. (D)	Edward Barrett (D)	John C. Martin (D)	33D, 18R	80D, 73R	J. Hamilton Lewis (D)	William H. Dieterich (D)	19D, 8R	Roosevelt/ Garner (D) ✓
1935	Henry Horner (D)	Thomas Donovan (D)	Edward J. Hughes (D)	Otto Kerner Sr. (D)	Edward Barrett (D)	John H. Stelle (D)	35D, 16R	84D, 69R	J. Hamilton Lewis (D)	William H. Dieterich (D)	21D, 6R	Roosevelt/ Garner (D) ✓
1936	Henry Horner (D)	Thomas Donovan (D)	Edward J. Hughes (D)	Otto Kerner Sr. (D)	Edward Barrett (D)	John H. Stelle (D)	35D, 16R	84D, 69R	J. Hamilton Lewis (D)	William H. Dieterich (D)	21D, 6R	Roosevelt/ Garner (D) ✓
1937	Henry Horner (D)	John H. Stelle (D)	Edward J. Hughes (D)	Otto Kerner Sr. (D)	Edward Barrett (D)	John C. Martin (D)	34D, 17R	86D, 67R	J. Hamilton Lewis (D)	William H. Dieterich (D)	21D, 6R	Roosevelt/ Garner (D) ✓
1938	Henry Horner (D)	John H. Stelle (D)	Edward J. Hughes (D)	Otto Kerner Sr. (D)	Edward Barrett (D)	John C. Martin (D)	34D, 17R	86D, 67R	J. Hamilton Lewis (D)	William H. Dieterich (D)	21D, 6R	Roosevelt/ Garner (D) ✓
1939	Henry Horner (D)	John H. Stelle (D)	Edward J. Hughes (D)	John E. Cassidy (D) (Note: Appointed to fill a vacancy.)	Edward Barrett (D)	Louie E. Lewis (D)	30D, 21R	80R, 73D	J. Hamilton Lewis (D)	Scott W. Lucas (D)	17D, 10R	Roosevelt/ Garner (D) ✓
1940	Henry Horner (D)	John H. Stelle (D)	Edward J. Hughes (D)	John E. Cassidy (D)	Edward Barrett (D)	Louie E. Lewis (D)	30D, 21R	80R, 73D	James M. Slattery (D)	Scott W. Lucas (D)	17D, 10R	Roosevelt/ Garner (D) ✓
1940	John H. Stelle (D)	vacant	Edward J. Hughes (D)	John E. Cassidy (D)	Edward Barrett (D)	Louie E. Lewis (D)	30D, 21R	80R, 73D	C. Wayland Brooks (R)	Scott W. Lucas (D)	17D, 10R	Roosevelt/ Wallace (D) ✓
1941	Dwight H. Green (R)	Hugh W. Cross (R)	Edward J. Hughes (D)	George F. Barrett (R)	Arthur C. Lueder (R)	Warren Wright (R)	28R, 23D	79R, 74D	C. Wayland Brooks (R)	Scott W. Lucas (D)	16R, 11D	Roosevelt/ Wallace (D) ✓
1942	Dwight H. Green (R)	Hugh W. Cross (R)	Edward J. Hughes (D)	George F. Barrett (R)	Arthur C. Lueder (R)	Warren Wright (R)	28R, 23D	79R, 74D	C. Wayland Brooks (R)	Scott W. Lucas (D)	16R, 11D	Roosevelt/ Wallace (D) ✓
1943	Dwight H. Green (R)	Hugh W. Cross (R)	Edward J. Hughes (D)	George F. Barrett (R)	Arthur C. Lueder (R)	William Stratton (R)	28R, 23D	84R, 69D	C. Wayland Brooks (R)	Scott W. Lucas (D)	19R, 7D	Roosevelt/ Wallace (D) ✓
1944	Dwight H. Green (R)	Hugh W. Cross (R)	Richard Y. Rowe (R)	George F. Barrett (R)	Arthur C. Lueder (R)	William Stratton (R)	28R, 23D	84R, 69D	C. Wayland Brooks (R)	Scott W. Lucas (D)	19R, 7D	Roosevelt/ Truman (D) ✓
1945	Dwight H. Green (R)	Hugh W. Cross (R)	Edward Barrett (D)	George F. Barrett (R)	Arthur C. Lueder (R)	Conrad F. Becker (R)	34R, 17D	78R, 75D	C. Wayland Brooks (R)	Scott W. Lucas (D)	15R, 11D	Roosevelt/ Truman (D) ✓
1946	Dwight H. Green (R)	Hugh W. Cross (R)	Edward Barrett (D)	George F. Barrett (R)	Arthur C. Lueder (R)	Conrad F. Becker (R)	34R, 17D	78R, 75D	C. Wayland Brooks (R)	Scott W. Lucas (D)	15R, 11D	Roosevelt/ Truman (D) ✓
1947	Dwight H. Green (R)	Hugh W. Cross (R)	Edward Barrett (D)	George F. Barrett (R)	Arthur C. Lueder (R)	Richard Y. Rowe (R)	37R, 14D	87R, 66D	C. Wayland Brooks (R)	Scott W. Lucas (D)	20R, 6D	Roosevelt/ Truman (D) ✓
1948	Dwight H. Green (R)	Hugh W. Cross (R)	Edward Barrett (D)	George F. Barrett (R)	Arthur C. Lueder (R)	Richard Y. Rowe (R)	37R, 14D	87R, 66D	C. Wayland Brooks (R)	Scott W. Lucas (D)	20R, 6D	Truman/ Barkley (D) ✓
1949	Adlai Stevenson II (D)	Sherwood Dixon (D)	Edward Barrett (D)	Ivan A. Elliott (D)	Benjamin O. Cooper (D)	Ora Smith (D)	33R, 18D	79D, 74R	Paul Douglas (D)	Scott W. Lucas (D)	14R, 12D	Truman/ Barkley (D) ✓
1950	Adlai Stevenson II (D)	Sherwood Dixon (D)	Edward Barrett (D)	Ivan A. Elliott (D)	Benjamin O. Cooper (D)	Ora Smith (D)	33R, 18D	79D, 74R	Paul Douglas (D)	Scott W. Lucas (D)	14R, 12D	Truman/ Barkley (D) ✓
1951	Adlai Stevenson II (D)	Sherwood Dixon (D)	Edward Barrett (D)	Ivan A. Elliott (D)	Benjamin O. Cooper (D)	William Stratton (R)	31R, 27D	84R, 69D	Paul Douglas (D)	Everett Dirksen (R)	18R, 8D	Truman/ Barkley (D) ✓
1952	Adlai Stevenson II (D)	Sherwood Dixon (D)	Edward Barrett (D)	Ivan A. Elliott (D)	Benjamin O. Cooper (D)	William Stratton (R)	31R, 27D	84R, 69D	Paul Douglas (D)	Everett Dirksen (R)	18R, 8D	Eisenhower/ Nixon (R) ✓
1953	William Stratton (R)	John William Chapman (R)	Charles F. Carpentier (R)	Latham Castle (R)	Orville Hodge (R)	Elmer Hoffman (R)	38R, 13D	84R, 69D	Paul Douglas (D)	Everett Dirksen (R)	16R, 9D	Eisenhower/ Nixon (R) ✓
1954	William Stratton (R)	John William Chapman (R)	Charles F. Carpentier (R)	Latham Castle (R)	Orville Hodge (R)	Elmer Hoffman (R)	38R, 13D	84R, 69D	Paul Douglas (D)	Everett Dirksen (R)	16R, 9D	Eisenhower/ Nixon (R) ✓
1955	William Stratton (R)	John William Chapman (R)	Charles F. Carpentier (R)	Latham Castle (R)	Orville Hodge (R)	Warren Wright (R)	32R, 19D	79R, 74D	Paul Douglas (D)	Everett Dirksen (R)	13R, 12D	Eisenhower/ Nixon (R) ✓
1956	William Stratton (R)	John William Chapman (R)	Charles F. Carpentier (R)	Latham Castle (R)	Lloyd Morey (R)	Warren Wright (R)	32R, 19D	79R, 74D	Paul Douglas (D)	Everett Dirksen (R)	13R, 12D	Eisenhower/ Nixon (R) ✓
1957	William Stratton (R)	John William Chapman (R)	Charles F. Carpentier (R)	Latham Castle (R)	Elbert S. Smith (R)	Elmer Hoffman (R)	38R, 20D	94R, 83D	Paul Douglas (D)	Everett Dirksen (R)	14R, 11D	Eisenhower/ Nixon (R) ✓
1958	William Stratton (R)	John William Chapman (R)	Charles F. Carpentier (R)	Latham Castle (R)	Elbert S. Smith (R)	Elmer Hoffman (R)	38R, 20D	94R, 83D	Paul Douglas (D)	Everett Dirksen (R)	14R, 11D	Eisenhower/ Nixon (R) ✓
1959	William Stratton (R)	John William Chapman (R)	Charles F. Carpentier (R)	Grenville Beardsley (R)	Elbert S. Smith (R)	Joseph D. Lohman (D)	34R, 24D	92D, 85R	Paul Douglas (D)	Everett Dirksen (R)	14D, 11R	Eisenhower/ Nixon (R) ✓
1960	William Stratton (R)	John William Chapman (R)	Charles F. Carpentier (R)	William L. Guild (R)	Elbert S. Smith (R)	Joseph D. Lohman (D)	34R, 24D	92D, 85R	Paul Douglas (D)	Everett Dirksen (R)	14D, 11R	Kennedy/ Johnson (D) ✓
1961	Otto Kerner Jr. (D)	Samuel Shapiro (D)	Charles F. Carpentier (R)	William G. Clark (D)	Michael Howlett (D)	Joseph D. Lohman (D)	31R, 27D	89R, 88D	Paul Douglas (D)	Everett Dirksen (R)	14D, 11R	Kennedy/ Johnson (D) ✓
1962	Otto Kerner Jr. (D)	Samuel Shapiro (D)	Charles F. Carpentier (R)	William G. Clark (D)	Michael Howlett (D)	Francis S. Lorenz (D)	31R, 27D	89R, 88D	Paul Douglas (D)	Everett Dirksen (R)	14D, 11R	Kennedy/ Johnson (D) ✓
1963	Otto Kerner Jr. (D)	Samuel Shapiro (D)	Charles F. Carpentier (R)	William G. Clark (D)	Michael Howlett (D)	William J. Scott (R)	35R, 23D	90R, 87D	Paul Douglas (D)	Everett Dirksen (R)	12D, 12R	Kennedy/ Johnson (D) ✓
1964	Otto Kerner Jr. (D)	Samuel Shapiro (D)	William H. Chamberlain (D)	William G. Clark (D)	Michael Howlett (D)	William J. Scott (R)	35R, 23D	90R, 87D	Paul Douglas (D)	Everett Dirksen (R)	12D, 12R	Johnson/ Humphrey (D) ✓
1965	Otto Kerner Jr. (D)	Samuel Shapiro (D)	Paul Powell (D)	William G. Clark (D)	Michael Howlett (D)	William J. Scott (R)	33R, 25D	118D, 59R	Paul Douglas (D)	Everett Dirksen (R)	13D, 11R	Johnson/ Humphrey (D) ✓
1966	Otto Kerner Jr. (D)	Samuel Shapiro (D)	Paul Powell (D)	William G. Clark (D)	Michael Howlett (D)	William J. Scott (R)	33R, 25D	118D, 59R	Paul Douglas (D)	Everett Dirksen (R)	13D, 11R	Johnson/ Humphrey (D) ✓
1967	Otto Kerner Jr. (D)	Samuel Shapiro (D)	Paul Powell (D)	William G. Clark (D)	Michael Howlett (D)	Adlai Stevenson III (D)	38R, 20D	99R, 78D	Charles H. Percy (R)	Everett Dirksen (R)	12D, 12R	Johnson/ Humphrey (D) ✓
1968	Otto Kerner Jr. (D)	Samuel Shapiro (D)	Paul Powell (D)	William G. Clark (D)	Michael Howlett (D)	Adlai Stevenson III (D)	38R, 20D	99R, 78D	Charles H. Percy (R)	Everett Dirksen (R)	12D, 12R	Nixon/ Agnew (R) ✓
1968	Samuel Shapiro (D)	vacant	Paul Powell (D)	William G. Clark (D)	Michael Howlett (D)	Adlai Stevenson III (D)	38R, 20D	99R, 78D	Charles H. Percy (R)	Everett Dirksen (R)	12D, 12R	Nixon/ Agnew (R) ✓
1969	Richard B. Ogilvie (R)	Paul Simon (D)	Paul Powell (D)	William J. Scott (R) (Note: Removed from Office upon tax fraud conviction.)	Michael Howlett (D)	Adlai Stevenson III (D)	38R, 20D	94R, 83D	Charles H. Percy (R)	Everett Dirksen (R)	12D, 12R	Nixon/ Agnew (R) ✓
1969	Richard B. Ogilvie (R)	Paul Simon (D)	Paul Powell (D)	William J. Scott (R)	Michael Howlett (D)	Adlai Stevenson III (D)	38R, 20D	94R, 83D	Charles H. Percy (R)	Ralph T. Smith (R)	12D, 12R	Nixon/ Agnew (R) ✓
1970	Richard B. Ogilvie (R)	Paul Simon (D)	Paul Powell (D)	William J. Scott (R)	Michael Howlett (D)	Adlai Stevenson III (D)	38R, 20D	94R, 83D	Charles H. Percy (R)	Ralph T. Smith (R)	12D, 12R	Nixon/ Agnew (R) ✓
1971	Richard B. Ogilvie (R)	Paul Simon (D)	John W. Lewis Jr. (R)	William J. Scott (R)	Michael Howlett (D)	Alan J. Dixon (D)	29D, 29R (Note: With a Democratic Lt. Governor, the Democrats retained the Senate majority and the Senate Presidency.)	90R, 87D	Charles H. Percy (R)	Adlai Stevenson III (D)	12D, 12R	Nixon/ Agnew (R) ✓
1972	Richard B. Ogilvie (R)	Paul Simon (D)	John W. Lewis Jr. (R)	William J. Scott (R)	Michael Howlett (D)	Alan J. Dixon (D)	29D, 29R	90R, 87D	Charles H. Percy (R)	Adlai Stevenson III (D)	12D, 12R	Nixon/ Agnew (R) ✓
1973	Dan Walker (D)	Neil Hartigan (D)	Michael Howlett (D)	William J. Scott (R)	George W. Lindberg (R)	Alan J. Dixon (D)	30R, 29D	92R, 84D, 1I	Charles H. Percy (R)	Adlai Stevenson III (D)	14R, 10D	Nixon/ Agnew (R) ✓
1974	Dan Walker (D)	Neil Hartigan (D)	Michael Howlett (D)	William J. Scott (R)	George W. Lindberg (R)	Alan J. Dixon (D)	30R, 29D	92R, 84D, 1I	Charles H. Percy (R)	Adlai Stevenson III (D)	14R, 10D	Nixon/ Agnew (R) ✓
1975	Dan Walker (D)	Neil Hartigan (D)	Michael Howlett (D)	William J. Scott (R)	George W. Lindberg (R)	Alan J. Dixon (D)	34D, 25R	98D, 76R, 3I	Charles H. Percy (R)	Adlai Stevenson III (D)	13D, 11R	Nixon/ Agnew (R) ✓
1976	Dan Walker (D)	Neil Hartigan (D)	Michael Howlett (D)	William J. Scott (R)	George W. Lindberg (R)	Alan J. Dixon (D)	34D, 25R	98D, 76R, 3I	Charles H. Percy (R)	Adlai Stevenson III (D)	13D, 11R	Ford/ Dole (R) ✗
1977	Jim Thompson (R)	Dave O'Neal (R)	Alan J. Dixon (D)	William J. Scott (R)	Michael Bakalis (D)	Donald R. Smith (R)	34D, 25R	93D, 83R, 1I	Charles H. Percy (R)	Adlai Stevenson III (D)	12D, 12R	Ford/ Dole (R) ✗
1978	Jim Thompson (R)	Dave O'Neal (R)	Alan J. Dixon (D)	William J. Scott (R)	Michael Bakalis (D)	Donald R. Smith (R)	34D, 25R	93D, 83R, 1I	Charles H. Percy (R)	Adlai Stevenson III (D)	12D, 12R	Ford/ Dole (R) ✗
1979	Jim Thompson (R)	Dave O'Neal (R)	Alan J. Dixon (D)	William J. Scott (R)	Roland Burris (D)	Jerome Cosentino (D)	32D, 27R	88D, 88R, 1I (Note: The Independent, Taylor Pouncey, caucused with the Democrats, giving them the votes to control the Speakership and run the House.)	Charles H. Percy (R)	Adlai Stevenson III (D)	13R, 11D	Ford/ Dole (R) ✗
1980	Jim Thompson (R)	Dave O'Neal (R)	Alan J. Dixon (D)	Tyrone C. Fahner (R)	Roland Burris (D)	Jerome Cosentino (D)	32D, 27R	88D, 88R, 1I	Charles H. Percy (R)	Adlai Stevenson III (D)	14R, 10D	Reagan/ Bush (R) ✓
1981	Jim Thompson (R)	Dave O'Neal (R)	Alan J. Dixon (D)	Tyrone C. Fahner (R)	Roland Burris (D)	Jerome Cosentino (D)	30D, 29R	91R, 85D, 1I	Charles H. Percy (R)	Alan J. Dixon (D)	14R, 10D	Reagan/ Bush (R) ✓
1981	Jim Thompson (R)	vacant	Jim Edgar (R) (Note: Initially appointed to fill vacancy; later elected in his own right.)	Tyrone C. Fahner (R)	Roland Burris (D)	Jerome Cosentino (D)	30D, 29R	91R, 85D, 1I	Charles H. Percy (R)	Alan J. Dixon (D)	14R, 10D	Reagan/ Bush (R) ✓
1982	Jim Thompson (R)	vacant	Jim Edgar (R)	Tyrone C. Fahner (R)	Roland Burris (D)	Jerome Cosentino (D)	30D, 29R	91R, 85D, 1I	Charles H. Percy (R)	Alan J. Dixon (D)	14R, 10D	Reagan/ Bush (R) ✓
1983	Jim Thompson (R)	George Ryan (R)	Jim Edgar (R)	Neil Hartigan (D)	Roland Burris (D)	James Donnewald (D)	33D, 26R	70D, 48R	Charles H. Percy (R)	Alan J. Dixon (D)	12D, 10R	Reagan/ Bush (R) ✓
1984	Jim Thompson (R)	George Ryan (R)	Jim Edgar (R)	Neil Hartigan (D)	Roland Burris (D)	James Donnewald (D)	33D, 26R	70D, 48R	Charles H. Percy (R)	Alan J. Dixon (D)	12D, 10R	Reagan/ Bush (R) ✓
1985	Jim Thompson (R)	George Ryan (R)	Jim Edgar (R)	Neil Hartigan (D)	Roland Burris (D)	James Donnewald (D)	31D, 28R	67D, 51R	Paul Simon (D)	Alan J. Dixon (D)	13D, 9R	Reagan/ Bush (R) ✓
1986	Jim Thompson (R)	George Ryan (R)	Jim Edgar (R)	Neil Hartigan (D)	Roland Burris (D)	James Donnewald (D)	31D, 28R	67D, 51R	Paul Simon (D)	Alan J. Dixon (D)	13D, 9R	Reagan/ Bush (R) ✓
1987	Jim Thompson (R)	George Ryan (R)	Jim Edgar (R)	Neil Hartigan (D)	Roland Burris (D)	Jerome Cosentino (D)	31D, 28R	67D, 51R	Paul Simon (D)	Alan J. Dixon (D)	13D, 9R	Reagan/ Bush (R) ✓
1988	Jim Thompson (R)	George Ryan (R)	Jim Edgar (R)	Neil Hartigan (D)	Roland Burris (D)	Jerome Cosentino (D)	31D, 28R	67D, 51R	Paul Simon (D)	Alan J. Dixon (D)	13D, 9R	Bush/ Quayle (R) ✓
1989	Jim Thompson (R)	George Ryan (R)	Jim Edgar (R)	Neil Hartigan (D)	Roland Burris (D)	Jerome Cosentino (D)	31D, 28R	68D, 50R	Paul Simon (D)	Alan J. Dixon (D)	14D, 8R	Bush/ Quayle (R) ✓
1990	Jim Thompson (R)	George Ryan (R)	Jim Edgar (R)	Neil Hartigan (D)	Roland Burris (D)	Jerome Cosentino (D)	31D, 28R	68D, 50R	Paul Simon (D)	Alan J. Dixon (D)	14D, 8R	Bush/ Quayle (R) ✓
1991	Jim Edgar (R)	Bob Kustra (R)	George Ryan (R)	Roland Burris (D)	Dawn Clark Netsch (D)	Pat Quinn (D)	31D, 28R	72D, 46R	Paul Simon (D)	Alan J. Dixon (D)	15D, 7R	Bush/ Quayle (R) ✓
1992	Jim Edgar (R)	Bob Kustra (R)	George Ryan (R)	Roland Burris (D)	Dawn Clark Netsch (D)	Pat Quinn (D)	31D, 28R	72D, 46R	Paul Simon (D)	Alan J. Dixon (D)	15D, 7R	Clinton/ Gore (D) ✓
1993	Jim Edgar (R)	Bob Kustra (R)	George Ryan (R)	Roland Burris (D)	Dawn Clark Netsch (D)	Pat Quinn (D)	32R, 27D	67D, 51R	Paul Simon (D)	Carol Moseley Braun (D)	12D, 8R	Clinton/ Gore (D) ✓
1994	Jim Edgar (R)	Bob Kustra (R)	George Ryan (R)	Roland Burris (D)	Dawn Clark Netsch (D)	Pat Quinn (D)	32R, 27D	67D, 51R	Paul Simon (D)	Carol Moseley Braun (D)	12D, 8R	Clinton/ Gore (D) ✓
1995	Jim Edgar (R)	Bob Kustra (R)	George Ryan (R)	Jim Ryan (R)	Loleta Didrickson (R)	Judy Baar Topinka (R)	33R, 26D	64R, 54D	Paul Simon (D)	Carol Moseley Braun (D)	10D, 10R	Clinton/ Gore (D) ✓
1996	Jim Edgar (R)	Bob Kustra (R)	George Ryan (R)	Jim Ryan (R)	Loleta Didrickson (R)	Judy Baar Topinka (R)	33R, 26D	64R, 54D	Paul Simon (D)	Carol Moseley Braun (D)	10D, 10R	Clinton/ Gore (D) ✓
1997	Jim Edgar (R)	Bob Kustra (R)	George Ryan (R)	Jim Ryan (R)	Loleta Didrickson (R)	Judy Baar Topinka (R)	31R, 28D	60D, 58R	Dick Durbin (D)	Carol Moseley Braun (D)	10D, 10R	Clinton/ Gore (D) ✓
1998	Jim Edgar (R)	Bob Kustra (R)	George Ryan (R)	Jim Ryan (R)	Loleta Didrickson (R)	Judy Baar Topinka (R)	31R, 28D	60D, 58R	Dick Durbin (D)	Carol Moseley Braun (D)	10D, 10R	Clinton/ Gore (D) ✓
1998	Jim Edgar (R)	vacant	George Ryan (R)	Jim Ryan (R)	Loleta Didrickson (R)	Judy Baar Topinka (R)	31R, 28D	60D, 58R	Dick Durbin (D)	Carol Moseley Braun (D)	10D, 10R	Clinton/ Gore (D) ✓
1999	George Ryan (R)	Corinne Wood (R)	Jesse White (D)	Jim Ryan (R)	Daniel Hynes (D)	Judy Baar Topinka (R)	32R, 27D	62D, 56R	Dick Durbin (D)	Peter Fitzgerald (R)	10D, 10R	Clinton/ Gore (D) ✓
2000	George Ryan (R)	Corinne Wood (R)	Jesse White (D)	Jim Ryan (R)	Daniel Hynes (D)	Judy Baar Topinka (R)	32R, 27D	62D, 56R	Dick Durbin (D)	Peter Fitzgerald (R)	10D, 10R	Gore/ Lieberman (D) ✗
2001	George Ryan (R)	Corinne Wood (R)	Jesse White (D)	Jim Ryan (R)	Daniel Hynes (D)	Judy Baar Topinka (R)	32R, 27D	62D, 56R	Dick Durbin (D)	Peter Fitzgerald (R)	10D, 10R	Gore/ Lieberman (D) ✗
2002	George Ryan (R)	Corinne Wood (R)	Jesse White (D)	Jim Ryan (R)	Daniel Hynes (D)	Judy Baar Topinka (R)	32R, 27D	62D, 56R	Dick Durbin (D)	Peter Fitzgerald (R)	10D, 10R	Gore/ Lieberman (D) ✗
2003	Rod Blagojevich (D) (Note: Impeached and removed from office by the state legislature on corruption charges.)	Pat Quinn (D)	Jesse White (D)	Lisa Madigan (D)	Daniel Hynes (D)	Judy Baar Topinka (R)	32D, 26R, 1I	66D, 52R	Dick Durbin (D)	Peter Fitzgerald (R)	10R, 9D	Gore/ Lieberman (D) ✗
2004	Rod Blagojevich (D)	Pat Quinn (D)	Jesse White (D)	Lisa Madigan (D)	Daniel Hynes (D)	Judy Baar Topinka (R)	32D, 26R, 1I	66D, 52R	Dick Durbin (D)	Peter Fitzgerald (R)	10R, 9D	Kerry/ Edwards (D) ✗
2005	Rod Blagojevich (D)	Pat Quinn (D)	Jesse White (D)	Lisa Madigan (D)	Daniel Hynes (D)	Judy Baar Topinka (R)	31D, 27R, 1I	65D, 53R	Dick Durbin (D)	Barack Obama (D) (Note: Resigned following election as president of the United States.)	10D, 9R	Kerry/ Edwards (D) ✗
2006	Rod Blagojevich (D)	Pat Quinn (D)	Jesse White (D)	Lisa Madigan (D)	Daniel Hynes (D)	Judy Baar Topinka (R)	31D, 27R, 1I	65D, 53R	Dick Durbin (D)	Barack Obama (D)	10D, 9R	Kerry/ Edwards (D) ✗
2007	Rod Blagojevich (D)	Pat Quinn (D)	Jesse White (D)	Lisa Madigan (D)	Daniel Hynes (D)	Alexi Giannoulias (D)	37D, 22R	66D, 52R	Dick Durbin (D)	Barack Obama (D)	10D, 9R	Kerry/ Edwards (D) ✗
2007	Rod Blagojevich (D)	Pat Quinn (D)	Jesse White (D)	Lisa Madigan (D)	Daniel Hynes (D)	Alexi Giannoulias (D)	37D, 22R	66D, 52R	Dick Durbin (D)	Barack Obama (D)	10D, 8R	Kerry/ Edwards (D) ✗
2008	Rod Blagojevich (D)	Pat Quinn (D)	Jesse White (D)	Lisa Madigan (D)	Daniel Hynes (D)	Alexi Giannoulias (D)	37D, 22R	67D, 51R	Dick Durbin (D)	Barack Obama (D)	10D, 8R	Obama/ Biden (D) ✓
2008	Rod Blagojevich (D)	Pat Quinn (D)	Jesse White (D)	Lisa Madigan (D)	Daniel Hynes (D)	Alexi Giannoulias (D)	37D, 22R	67D, 51R	Dick Durbin (D)	Barack Obama (D)	11D, 8R	Obama/ Biden (D) ✓
2009	Pat Quinn (D)	vacant	Jesse White (D)	Lisa Madigan (D)	Daniel Hynes (D)	Alexi Giannoulias (D)	37D, 22R	70D, 48R	Dick Durbin (D)	Roland Burris (D)	12D, 7R	Obama/ Biden (D) ✓
2010	Pat Quinn (D)	vacant	Jesse White (D)	Lisa Madigan (D)	Daniel Hynes (D)	Alexi Giannoulias (D)	37D, 22R	70D, 48R	Dick Durbin (D)	Roland Burris (D)	12D, 7R	Obama/ Biden (D) ✓
2011	Pat Quinn (D)	Sheila Simon (D)	Jesse White (D)	Lisa Madigan (D)	Judy Baar Topinka (R)	Dan Rutherford (R)	35D, 24R	64D, 54R	Dick Durbin (D)	Mark Kirk (R)	11R, 8D	Obama/ Biden (D) ✓
2012	Pat Quinn (D)	Sheila Simon (D)	Jesse White (D)	Lisa Madigan (D)	Judy Baar Topinka (R)	Dan Rutherford (R)	35D, 24R	64D, 54R	Dick Durbin (D)	Mark Kirk (R)	11R, 8D	Obama/ Biden (D) ✓
2013	Pat Quinn (D)	Sheila Simon (D)	Jesse White (D)	Lisa Madigan (D)	Judy Baar Topinka (R)	Dan Rutherford (R)	40D, 19R	71D, 47R	Dick Durbin (D)	Mark Kirk (R)	12D, 6R	Obama/ Biden (D) ✓
2014	Pat Quinn (D)	Sheila Simon (D)	Jesse White (D)	Lisa Madigan (D)	Judy Baar Topinka (R)	Dan Rutherford (R)	40D, 19R	71D, 47R	Dick Durbin (D)	Mark Kirk (R)	12D, 6R	Obama/ Biden (D) ✓
2015	Bruce Rauner (R)	Evelyn Sanguinetti (R)	Jesse White (D)	Lisa Madigan (D)	Leslie Munger (R)	Mike Frerichs (D)	39D, 20R	71D, 47R	Dick Durbin (D)	Mark Kirk (R)	10D, 8R	Obama/ Biden (D) ✓
2016	Bruce Rauner (R)	Evelyn Sanguinetti (R)	Jesse White (D)	Lisa Madigan (D)	Leslie Munger (R)	Mike Frerichs (D)	39D, 20R	71D, 47R	Dick Durbin (D)	Mark Kirk (R)	10D, 8R	Clinton/ Kaine (D) ✗
2017	Bruce Rauner (R)	Evelyn Sanguinetti (R)	Jesse White (D)	Lisa Madigan (D)	Susana Mendoza (D)	Mike Frerichs (D)	37D, 22R	67D, 51R	Dick Durbin (D)	Tammy Duckworth (D)	11D, 7R	Clinton/ Kaine (D) ✗
2018	Bruce Rauner (R)	Evelyn Sanguinetti (R)	Jesse White (D)	Lisa Madigan (D)	Susana Mendoza (D)	Mike Frerichs (D)	37D, 22R	67D, 51R	Dick Durbin (D)	Tammy Duckworth (D)	11D, 7R	Clinton/ Kaine (D) ✗
2019	J. B. Pritzker (D)	Juliana Stratton (D)	Jesse White (D)	Kwame Raoul (D)	Susana Mendoza (D)	Mike Frerichs (D)	40D, 19R	74D, 44R	Dick Durbin (D)	Tammy Duckworth (D)	13D, 5R	Clinton/ Kaine (D) ✗
2020	J. B. Pritzker (D)	Juliana Stratton (D)	Jesse White (D)	Kwame Raoul (D)	Susana Mendoza (D)	Mike Frerichs (D)	40D, 19R	74D, 44R	Dick Durbin (D)	Tammy Duckworth (D)	13D, 5R	Biden/ Harris (D) ✓
2021	J. B. Pritzker (D)	Juliana Stratton (D)	Jesse White (D)	Kwame Raoul (D)	Susana Mendoza (D)	Mike Frerichs (D)	41D, 18R	73D, 45R	Dick Durbin (D)	Tammy Duckworth (D)	13D, 5R	Biden/ Harris (D) ✓
2022	J. B. Pritzker (D)	Juliana Stratton (D)	Jesse White (D)	Kwame Raoul (D)	Susana Mendoza (D)	Mike Frerichs (D)	41D, 18R	73D, 45R	Dick Durbin (D)	Tammy Duckworth (D)	13D, 5R	Biden/ Harris (D) ✓
2023	J. B. Pritzker (D)	Juliana Stratton (D)	Alexi Giannoulias (D)	Kwame Raoul (D)	Susana Mendoza (D)	Mike Frerichs (D)	40D, 19R	78D, 40R	Dick Durbin (D)	Tammy Duckworth (D)	14D, 3R	Biden/ Harris (D) ✓
2024	J. B. Pritzker (D)	Juliana Stratton (D)	Alexi Giannoulias (D)	Kwame Raoul (D)	Susana Mendoza (D)	Mike Frerichs (D)	40D, 19R	78D, 40R	Dick Durbin (D)	Tammy Duckworth (D)	14D, 3R	Harris/ Walz (D) ✗
2025	J. B. Pritzker (D)	Juliana Stratton (D)	Alexi Giannoulias (D)	Kwame Raoul (D)	Susana Mendoza (D)	Mike Frerichs (D)	40D, 19R	78D, 40R	Dick Durbin (D)	Tammy Duckworth (D)	14D, 3R	Harris/ Walz (D) ✗
2026	J. B. Pritzker (D)	Juliana Stratton (D)	Alexi Giannoulias (D)	Kwame Raoul (D)	Susana Mendoza (D)	Mike Frerichs (D)	40D, 19R	78D, 40R	Dick Durbin (D)	Tammy Duckworth (D)	14D, 3R	Harris/ Walz (D) ✗
2027	J. B. Pritzker (D)	Christian Mitchell (D)	Alexi Giannoulias (D)	Kwame Raoul (D)	Margaret Croke (D)	Mike Frerichs (D)	45D, 14R	84D, 34R	Juliana Stratton (D)	Tammy Duckworth (D)	14D, 3R	Harris/ Walz (D) ✗

== Gallery ==
Gallery of Illinois presidential election results
Illinois in the 2000 presidential election. Gore v. Bush.

Illinois in the 2004 presidential election. Kerry v. Bush.

Illinois in the 2008 presidential election. Obama v. McCain.

Illinois in the 2012 presidential election. Obama v. Romney.

Illinois in the 2016 presidential election. Clinton v. Trump.

Illinois in the 2020 presidential election. Biden v. Trump.

Illinois in the 2024 presidential election. Harris v. Trump.
Gallery of Illinois US Senate election results
2004 US Senate election results.

2008 US Senate election results.

2010 US Senate election results.

2014 US Senate election results.

2016 US Senate election results.

2020 US Senate election results.

2022 US Senate election results.
Gallery of Illinois gubernatorial election results
Illinois gubernatorial race in 2002

Illinois gubernatorial race in 2006

Illinois gubernatorial race in 2010. Notice that Pat Quinn won while carrying the same counties as losing Democratic Senate candidate Alexi Giannoulias.

2014 Illinois gubernatorial election. Incumbent Democratic governor Pat Quinn was defeated for reelection by Republican candidate Bruce Rauner. Notice that Rauner carried every county except Cook County.

2018 Illinois gubernatorial election. Strong Democratic turnout in Chicago, Cook County, all of the suburban collar counties, and modest growth in downstate support (mainly in the smaller cities) drove J. B. Pritzker's decisive victory.

2022 Illinois gubernatorial election. Results were very similar to 2018.

== See also ==
- Elections in Illinois
- Government of Illinois
- Politics in Illinois
- Politics of Illinois
- Workingmen's Party of Illinois
