= List of people from Galena, Illinois =

The following list includes notable people who were born or have lived in Galena, Illinois. For a similar list organized alphabetically by last name, see the category page People from Galena, Illinois.

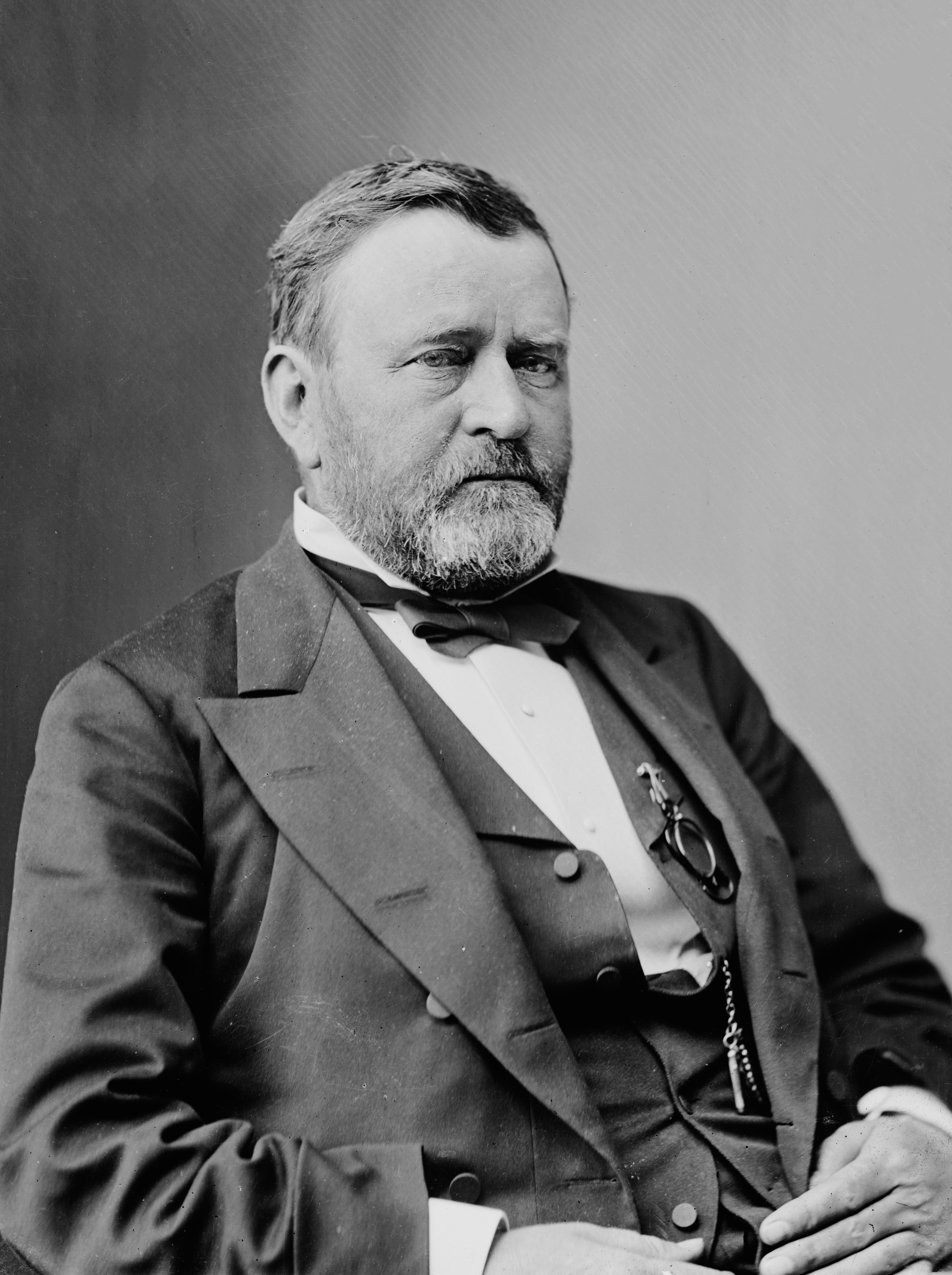
Ulysses S. Grant in the 1870s

== The Grant family and other notable Civil War era citizens ==
- Edward Dickinson Baker, U.S. senator and representative, served the Galena area; the only congressman to die in the Civil War
- Frederick Dent Grant (1850–1912), son of Ulysses S. Grant; went to public schools in Galena; New York City police commissioner
- Jesse Root Grant (1858–1932), son of Ulysses S. Grant; politician and author
- Julia Grant (1826–1902), wife of Ulysses S. Grant, First Lady of the United States (1869–77); first First Lady to write a memoir, though it was not published until 1975
- Nellie Grant (1855–1922), only daughter of Ulysses S. Grant
- Ulysses S. Grant (1823–1885), lived in Galena (1860–1861), in a rented house while he worked at his father and brother's leather shop. After the Civil War, Grant returned to Galena to a hero's welcome on 18 August 1865, and was presented with a furnished home, that he lived in until becoming president in 1869, and which he visited regularly until 1880.
- Ulysses S. Grant, Jr. (1852–1929), son of Ulysses S. Grant; owned U.S. Grant Hotel in San Diego, CA
- Elihu B. Washburne, Grant's secretary of state; notable abolitionist; resident of Galena; the Elihu Benjamin Washburne House is a registered historic site

== Galena's other notable generals ==
Galena had more citizen generals per capita than any other city in the nation (9 in a city of approximately 12,000).

- Augustus Louis Chetlain, considered the first man from Illinois to volunteer for the Union army; U.S. consul to Belgium
- Jasper Adalmorn Maltby (1826–1867), general in the Union army during the American Civil War; military mayor of Vicksburg; head of registration bureau, enrolling black voters
- Ely Samuel Parker (1828–1895), Civil War-era general; transcribed Appomattox surrender terms; Grant's aide-de-camp until 1869; U.S. Commissioner of Indian Affairs (1869–71); superintendent during the building of Galena's post office and Marine Hospital; restarted Galena's Masonic Lodge and chartered it as Miner's Lodge #273, still in operation
- John Aaron Rawlins (1831–1869), Civil War general; Galena's City Attorney (1857); Grant's Secretary of War and adjutant assistant general
- John Corson Smith, general in the Union army during the Civil War; member of Miner's Lodge #273; later served in high-ranking positions in Illinois's Grand Lodge of Ancient and Accepted Freemasons, including Most Worshipful Grand Master
- John Eugene Smith, general in the Union army during the American Civil War

== 19th-century residents ==
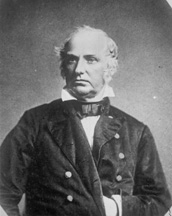
U.S. Senator Edward D. Baker

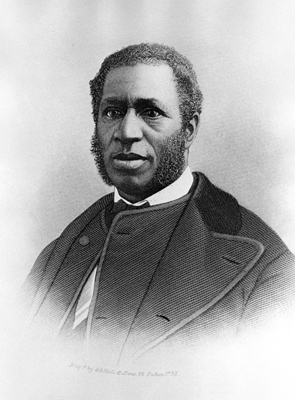
Bishop, college president, and U.S. Representative Richard H. Cain

- John F. Beard (1822–1891), lived in Galena for one year in 1845; plasterer and Wisconsin state assemblyman
- James Beckwourth (1798–1866), explorer; came to Galena as a miner in the 1820s; some reports say that he was an indentured servant
- Henry M. Billings (1806–1862), came to Galena as a miner in 1828; served in the Wisconsin Territorial House. In 1848, he served in the Wisconsin State Senate and then the Wisconsin State Assembly in 1858
- John Wilford Blackstone, Sr. (1796–1868), miner and lawyer in Galena; served in the Wisconsin Territorial Legislature
- Ebenezer Brigham (1789–1861), one of the first settlers of Galena, in 1822; later one of the first permanent settlers of Dane County, Wisconsin; served on Territorial Council
- Richard H. Cain (1825–1887), congressman, bishop, vice president of the "Colored Convention" (1853), first president of Paul Quinn College
- Donald A. Callahan (1876–1951), politician, born and raised in Galena; Republican Party nominee for the United States Senate seat in Idaho in 1938; was defeated; served in both chambers of the Idaho state legislature
- Thompson Campbell (1811–1868), politician, miner in Galena; Illinois secretary of state (1843–1846); U.S. representative for Illinois' 6th Congressional District (1851–1853)
- M. H. Cleary (1853–1933), Illinois state legislator, lawyer, and physician
- Samuel Crawford (1820–1860), Wisconsin Supreme Court
- Henry D. Dement (1840–1927), son of John Dement and grandson of Henry Dodge; served in the 13th Illinois Volunteer Infantry Regiment; elected to two terms in the Illinois House of Representatives starting in 1870, then two terms in the Illinois Senate, then two terms as Illinois secretary of state (1880–1888)
- John Dement (1804–1883), receiver of Public Moneys (two tenures); U.S. representative; delegate to every Illinois Constitutional Convention during his lifetime; president pro tempore of the 1862 and 1870 conventions
- Nelson Dewey (1813–1889), clerk for Daniels, Dennison, and Co. in Galena for a month in 1836; first governor of Wisconsin (1848–52)
- Moses Dickson (1824–1901), lived for a brief time and was married in Galena; abolitionist; helped organize the International Order of Twelve Knights and Daughters of Tabor, the Order of Twelve, which was created in Galena and used St. Louis as its headquarters to aid slaves in the Underground Railroad
- Augustus C. Dodge (1812–1883), politician; worked in his father's lead mines (1827–1837); part of the first set of senators from Iowa (1848–1855); minister to Spain (1855–1859)
- Henry Dodge (1782–1867), politician; operated mines in Galena; Wisconsin's first senator (1848–1857); Wisconsin’s first and fourth territorial governor (1836–41, 1845–1848); US representative for Wisconsin territory (1841–45)
- Thomas Drummond (1809–1890), lawyer, had a practice in Galena (1835–50); member of the Illinois General Assembly as a Whig (1840–1841); during this time he became acquainted with fellow Whig Assemblyman Abraham Lincoln; judge for the Circuit Court of Illinois (c. 1841–1850), judge for the District of Illinois
- Jacob Fawcett (1847–1928), Nebraska Supreme Court chief justice
- Thomas Ford (1800–1850), politician; served as Illinois governor (1842–1846)
- John Froelich (1849–1933), lived most of his early life and attended school in Galena; in 1892, developed the first stable gasoline/petrol-powered tractor with forward and reverse gears
- John H. Gear (1825–1900), 11th governor of Iowa (1878–1882), congressman; senator; assistant secretary of the Treasury 1892–1893
- Joseph Gillespie (1809–1885), mined in Galena; member of the Illinois State Senate
- Henry Gratiot (1789–1836), trader and businessman who moved to Galena to raise his family in a free state; helped conduct a treaty that ended the Black Hawk War for the Galena area; his daughter married Elihu Washburne
- Moses Hallett (1834–1913), born in Galena; lawyer; moved to Colorado as a gold miner in 1860; judge on United States District Court for the District of Colorado 1877–1906
- William S. Hamilton (1797–1850), son of Alexander Hamilton; captain during the Winnebago War in the volunteer Illinois Militia; commanded a company raised in Galena, the Galena Mounted Volunteers
- Granville Hedrick (1814–1881), leader in the Latter Day Saints movement after the 1844 succession crisis; worked in Galena lead mines, 1843–44
- Stephen P. Hempstead (1812–1883), 2nd governor of Iowa
- Joseph P. Hoge (1810–1891), Illinois congressman, president of the California state constitutional convention (1878), superior court judge
- William Henry Hooper (1813–1882), engaged in trade on the Mississippi River in the mid-1830s in Galena; later became a member of the LDS Church; Utah delegate to the United States Congress (1859–1861, 1865–1873)
- Thomas Hoyne (1817–1883), US District Attorney for Illinois
- Henry Jackson (1811–1857), operated a store in Galena; served in the Wisconsin Territorial Legislature, and in 1849 was elected to the first Minnesota Territorial Legislature; helped founded Mankato, Minnesota in 1852
- Joseph Jefferson (1829–1905), at age 13 with his family performed for a year in Galena at the current site of Fried Green Tomatoes
- George Wallace Jones (1804–1892), one of the first two senators from Iowa; mined in Galena and owned a store in Galena during the 1830s
- Joseph Russell Jones (1823–1909), politician, lawyer, merchant; became so successful that he built the Belvedere Mansion, the largest house in Galena, in 1857; U.S. marshal for the Northern District; minister resident to Belgium; collector of the Port of Chicago
- Lora Josephine Knight (1864–1945), philanthropist; born in Galena
- H. H. Kohlsaat (1853–1924), Chicago newspaper publisher; friend and adviser to five U.S. presidents
- Heinrich Lienhard (1822–1903), lived in Galena for a few months before emigrating to California; his writings are an important historical source for the history of the California Trail and Sutter's Fort in California 1846–1850
- James D. Lynch (1839–1872), minister, first black Mississippi secretary of state
- George Frederick Magoun (1821–1896), educator, taught school in Galena 1844–46; first president of Iowa College (1865–1885) and a founding trustee; a liberal president, permitting the teaching of evolution despite his personal disagreement with Darwin's work; after his retirement as college president, took a professorship in Mental and Moral Science at Iowa College (1884–1890)
- Father Samuel Mazzuchelli (1806–1864), Italian Catholic missionary and architect; designed, built, founded, and was pastor (1835–1843) of St. Michael's Church; designed and built St. Mary's Church in Galena (1860), among many others built in the tri-state area; architect of the first Jo Daviess County Courthouse (1839) and Old Market Town Hall (1845); declared venerable by Pope John Paul II in 1993, the first step to becoming a saint
- Robert H. McClellan (1823–1902), practiced law in Galena for most of his adult life; elected as a Republican to a term in the Illinois House of Representatives (1860–1862) and two terms in the Illinois Senate (1876–1880); edited the Galena Gazette; president of the Bank of Galena
- William Douglas McHugh (1859–1923), born in Galena and practiced law there, 1883–1888; general counsel to International Harvester Corporation in Chicago 1920–1923
- Thomas McKnight (1787–1865), arrived in Galena as a miner and was appointed land receiver for the United States Land Office in Galena; served in the first Wisconsin Territorial Council in the Wisconsin Territorial Legislature; opened the first smelt furnace business in Dubuque, Iowa; unsuccessfully ran for governor of Iowa in 1846
- Herman Melville (1819–1891), lived in Galena during the summer of 1840; his uncle was a prominent citizen in Galena in the 1840s
- Richard L. Murphy (1875–1936), senator from Iowa (1933–1936); began his journalism career at age 15 as a reporter for the Galena Gazette newspaper, 1890–1892
- Charles Sreeve Peterson (1818–1889), lived in Galena; early leader in the Latter Day Saint movement
- Curtis H. Pettit (1833–1914), lived in Galena for one year in 1855; pioneer Minneapolis banker; served in Minnesota Senate and House of Representatives
- Thomas R. Potts (1810–1874), lived in Galena 1841–1849; local physician; Saint Paul, Minnesota's first mayor 1850–1851
- Orville C. Pratt (1819–1891), lawyer, judge, lived in Galena, had a law practice in Galena (1843–1849); 2nd associate justice of the Oregon Supreme Court (1848–52)
- William A. Richards (1849–1912), fourth governor of Wyoming; educated in Galena
- Frederick Schwatka (1849–1892), Army lieutenant; explorer of northern Canada and Alaska
- Benjamin R. Sheldon (1811–1897), lived in Galena until 1871; Illinois circuit court judge 1848–1870; served on the Illinois Supreme Court 1870–1885
- James W. Stephenson (1806–1838), lived in Galena; raised a company and served in the Black Hawk War; served in Illinois Senate (1834–1838); nominated as the Democrat's candidate for governor in the first Illinois Democratic State Convention in 1837, but had to withdraw six months later; died and was buried in Galena
- Levi Sterling (1804–1868), lived in Galena; served in the Wisconsin Territorial Council of the Wisconsin Territorial Legislature
- James M. Strode (1800?–1848), lived in Galena most of his life; during the Black Hawk War he was given command of the 27th Regiment of the Illinois militia and oversaw the construction of a fort in that city
- George Bell Swift (1845–1912), mayor of Chicago (1893; 1895–97), grew up in Galena
- Henry H. Taylor (1841–1909), born and lived most of his life in Galena; served in the 45th Illinois Infantry; received the Medal of Honor for his actions during the Battle of Vicksburg; the first to plant the Union's colors on the "enemy's works"
- Horace A. Tenney (1820–1906), moved to Galena in 1845 and started the Galena Jeffersonian newspaper with his brother; Wisconsin assistant state Geologist; served in the Wisconsin Assembly in 1857
- Jesse B. Thomas, Jr. (1806–1850), lawyer, judge, moved to Galena after he retired from the Illinois Supreme Court (1843–1848); Illinois attorney general (1835–1836)
- Hiram M. Van Arman (1839–1904), educated in Galena; served as lieutenant in the 58th Illinois Volunteer Infantry Regiment; Secretary of the Arizona Territory (1882–1885)
- William B. Waddell (1807–1872), a founder of the Pony Express; mined in Galena 1824–1829
- Henry O. Wagoner (1816–1901), civil rights activist and abolitionist in Chicago and Denver; lived in Galena 1839–1843;typesetter for a local newspaper
- Hempstead Washburne (1851–1918), mayor of Chicago (1891–1893); son of Elihu B. Washburne; born and raised in Galena; relocated to Chicago where he practiced law and served one term as mayor
- John Henry Weber (1779–1859), assistant superintendent of U.S. government lead mines in Galena in 1833; served briefly as superintendent until his retirement in 1840, previously an explorer and fur trader; explored territory in the Rocky Mountains and in Utah; namesake of Weber State University

== 20th-century residents ==
- Leo E. Allen (1898–1973), U.S. congressman (1933–1961) representing the 13th and 16th districts; Jo Daviess County clerk; taught at Galena; practiced law
- John W. Cox, Jr., congressman from Illinois' 16th (1991–1993), the first Democrat to serve the area since 1850
- Edgar Cunningham (1910–1980), first African American Eagle Scout; married in Galena and briefly lived there
- G. Walter Dittmar (1872–1949), lived and practiced dentistry in Galena; faculty member at University of Illinois-Chicago College of Dentistry; president of the American Dental Association
- Katharine Gibbs (1863–1934), born in Galena; founder of Gibbs College
- John Hope (1911–2002), meteorologist who specialized in hurricane forecasting; on-air personality on The Weather Channel; lived his final years in Galena
- Thomas B. Howard (1854–1920), born and raised in Galena; commander in chief of the U.S. Pacific Fleet prior to entry into World War I; sailed around the world with the Great White Fleet
- Donald William Kerst (1911–1993), physicist, born in Galena, earned a PhD from University of Wisconsin in 1937; professor at University of Illinois (1938–1957); during World War II, worked at Los Alamos, New Mexico; was employed at the General Atomic Laboratory, La Jolla, working on the Manhattan Project (1957–1962); developed the betatron in 1940 and became the first person to accelerate electrons using magnetic fields
- Francis Marshall, brigadier general during World War I; awarded the Army Distinguished Service Medal for his achievements in his command during the Meuse-Argonne Offensive
- Don McNeill (1907–1996), radio personality, creator and host of Don McNeill's Breakfast Club, which aired for more than 30 years
- Christian Narkiewicz-Laine, architect, artist, poet, writer, architecture critic, former architecture critic of the Chicago Sun-Times, former editor of Inland Architect, former director of the American Institute of Architects, former executive of Joseph P. Kennedy Enterprises, Inc., president of the Chicago Athenaeum: Museum of Architecture and Design
- Jim Post, folk singer-songwriter, playwright and actor; former member of band Friend and Lover; wrote the top 10 Billboard hit "Reach Out of the Darkness" in 1968
- Adlai Stevenson II (1900–1965), politician; owned a farm outside of Galena in the 1940s; governor of Illinois (1949–1953); U.S. ambassador to the United Nations; Democratic Party presidential candidate in 1952 and 1956
- James Wright, president of Dartmouth College (1998–2009), and history department faculty member 1969–2009; graduated from Galena High School in 1957; wrote a book on Galena's lead district in 1966
- LaMetta Wynn, first black woman to head an Iowa municipality: mayor of Clinton, Iowa (1995–2007); graduated from Galena High School
