= William H. Hinrichsen =

American politician

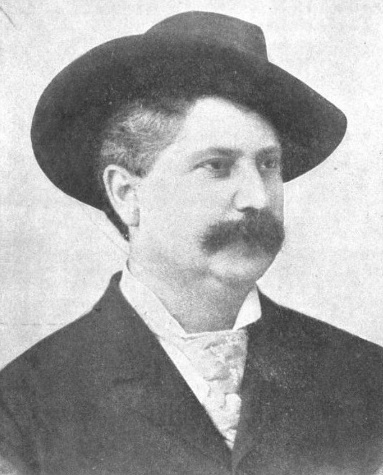
- Frontispiece of Hinrichsen's 1902 book Plots and Penalties

Member of the U.S. House of Representatives from Illinois's 16th district
- In office March 4, 1897 – March 3, 1899
- Preceded by: John I. Rinaker
- Succeeded by: William E. Williams

19th Secretary of State of Illinois
- In office January 10, 1893 – January 11, 1897
- Governor: John Peter Altgeld
- Preceded by: Isaac N. Pearson
- Succeeded by: James A. Rose

Personal details
- Born: May 27, 1850 Franklin, Illinois, U.S.
- Died: December 18, 1907 (aged 57) Alexander, Illinois, U.S.
- Party: Democratic

William Henry Hinrichsen (May 27, 1850 – December 18, 1907) was a U.S. representative from Illinois. Hinrichsen was Sheriff of Morgan County from 1880 to 1882. He afterwards turned to publishing interests, owning the Illinois Courier and Quincy Herald. Hinrichsen became involved with the Democratic Party in 1888, eventually rising to the position of Secretary of State of Illinois in 1892. During his term, he was elected chairman of the state Democratic Committee. He was then elected to the United States House of Representatives and served one term. He briefly edited the Cincinnati Enquirer and spent the rest of his life writing.

== Biography ==
William Henry Hinrichsen was born in Franklin, Illinois on May 27, 1850, the son of Edward S. and Nancy Ann Hinrichsen. He attended public schools and the Illinois Industrial University at Champaign. Graduating in 1870, he took a job as a station agent for the Northern Cross Railroad in Alexander. He was elected Justice of the Peace of Alexander in 1871 and was reelected in 1873. He married Louise Sparks on July 13, 1873.

Hinrichsen was appointed Deputy Sheriff of Morgan County in 1874 and served three two-year terms in that position, residing at Jacksonville. He served as Sheriff from 1880 to 1882. In 1882, while serving as Sheriff, Hinrichsen became editor of the Illinois Courier, a weekly newspaper in Jacksonville. In 1883, he pushed to have it become a daily paper.

He moved to Quincy in 1887 after purchasing the Quincy Herald. Hinrichsen also founded the Index, a legal reader. Hinrichsen became involved with politics, joining the Democratic Party in 1888. He managed the press bureau of the state office until his death. Hinrichsen returned to Jacksonville after selling the Herald in 1890 and was elected Clerk of the House of Representatives of Illinois the next year. He was selected as a member of the Democratic State Central Committee in 1892, where he traveled around the state to ensure that Democratic County Committees were properly organized. Hinrichsen was nominated as the Democratic candidate for Secretary of State of Illinois in 1892 and was elected to a four-year term under John Peter Altgeld. Hinrichsen sold his newspaper interests after the election.

In 1895, Hinrichsen was named the chairman of the Democratic State Central Committee. He served as delegate to the Democratic National Convention in 1896. Hinrichsen was nominated by his party to the United States House of Representatives in 1896 and won the election. He served in the Fifty-fifth Congress (March 4, 1897 – March 3, 1899).

After his congressional term, Hinrichsen returned to his home in Alexander. He managed the Cincinnati Enquirer for a year while its Democratic editor John Roll McLean sought the governorship of Ohio in 1899. The next year, he was Traveling Manager of the Democratic National Committee, raising funds for the 1900 presidential campaign. Hinrichsen spent his latter years as a writer. He contributed weekly short stories to the Chicago Inter Ocean. He later published a collection of these stories in a book. He died in Alexander on December 18, 1907, and was interred in Diamond Grove Cemetery in Jacksonville.

Party political offices
Preceded by Newell Douglas Ricks	Democratic nominee for Secretary of State of Illinois; 1892	Succeeded by Finis E. Downing
Political offices
Preceded by Isaac N. Pearson	Illinois Secretary of State; 1892 – 1896	Succeeded by James A. Rose
U.S. House of Representatives
Preceded by John I. Rinaker	United States Representative for the 16th Congressional District of Illinois; 1897 – 1899	Succeeded by William E. Williams
