= Henry D. Dement =

American politician (1840–1927)

17th Illinois Secretary of State
- In office 1880–1888
- Governor: Shelby M. Cullom; John M. Hamilton; Richard J. Oglesby
- Preceded by: George H. Harlow
- Succeeded by: Isaac N. Pearson

Member of the Illinois Senate from the 12th district
- In office 1876–1880
- Preceded by: George P. Jacobs
- Succeeded by: Isaac Rice

Member of the Illinois House of Representatives from the 12th district
- In office 1872–1876

Personal details
- Born: October 10, 1840 Galena, Illinois, U.S.
- Died: July 13, 1927 (aged 86) Memphis, Tennessee, U.S.
- Party: Republican
- Spouse: Mary F. Williams
- Relations: John Dement (father); Henry Dodge (grandfather)
- Profession: Businessman

Henry Dodge Dement (October 10, 1840 - July 13, 1927) was an American politician from Illinois. The son of John Dement and grandson of Henry Dodge, Dement received private schooling until the Civil War broke out. He was discharged in 1863 after attaining the rank of captain with the 13th Illinois Volunteer Infantry Regiment. Dement was elected to two terms in the Illinois House of Representatives starting in 1870, then two terms in the Illinois Senate, then two terms as Illinois Secretary of State.

== Biography ==
Henry Dodge Dement was born in Galena, Illinois, on October 10, 1840. He was the grandson of Henry Dodge through his mother Mary. His father, John Dement, was also a prominent politician. Dement attended Rock River Seminary in Mount Morris, Illinois, then at Sinsinawa Mound College in Sinsinawa, Wisconsin, and the Dixon Collegiate Institute in Dixon, Illinois. Before he could graduate, the Civil War broke out and Dement enlisted with Company A of the 13th Illinois Volunteer Infantry Regiment. He was commissioned second lieutenant on April 20, 1861, then as first lieutenant that July. He served in the Department of the West, then later fought at the Battle of Chickasaw Bayou. His regiment fought at the Battle of Arkansas Post and participated in the Siege of Vicksburg. On February 3, 1863, Dement was named a captain. His final war duty was the Jackson Expedition; he then left the service in August 1863.

Dement returned to Dixon to form a plow manufacturing company with William Todd. In 1870, he left the business to start to manufacture flax bags for cotton bales. In 1872, Dement was elected to the Illinois House of Representatives as a Republican. He served two two-year terms there, then was elected to the Illinois Senate, again serving two terms. In 1880, the Republicans nominated Dement as the Illinois Secretary of State. He was elected and served two four-year terms. While Secretary of State, Dement was known to hunt pigeons from the roof of the State House with a shotgun. After this office, he served as head of the Joliet Penitentiary. Dement found his business affairs in disarray by this point and accepted a position as a post office inspector, which he held for fourteen years. He retired to Wilmette, Illinois.

Dement married Mary F. Williams on October 20, 1864. They had at least six children, though only four daughters reached adulthood. Dement was a Presbyterian. He died in Memphis, Tennessee, on July 13, 1927.

Party political offices
Preceded by George H. Harlow	Republican nominee for Secretary of State of Illinois; 1880, 1884	Succeeded by Isaac N. Pearson
Political offices
Preceded by George H. Harlow	Secretary of State of Illinois; 1880–1888	Succeeded by Isaac N. Pearson
