= Alexander, Illinois =

- Census-designated place
- Location within Illinois Location within the United States
- Coordinates: 39°43′18″N 90°02′13″W
- Country: United States
- State: Illinois
- County: Morgan

Area
  - Total: 0.98 sq mi (2.55 km^{2})
  - Land: 0.98 sq mi (2.55 km^{2})
  - Water: 0 sq mi (0.00 km^{2})
- Elevation: 659 ft (201 m)

Population (2020)
  - Total: 155
  - Density: 157.5/sq mi (60.83/km^{2})
- Time zone: UTC-6 (Central (CST))
  - Summer (DST): UTC-5 (CDT)
- ZIP code: 62601
- Area code: 217
- FIPS code: 17-00659
- GNIS feature ID: 2804093

Alexander is an unincorporated community and census-designated place (CDP) in Morgan County, Illinois, United States. Alexander is 10 miles (16 km) east of Jacksonville, the county seat, and has a post office with ZIP code 62601. As of the 2020 census, it had a population of 155.

== History ==
Alexander was laid out in the 1850s by John T. Alexander, and named for him. A post office has been in operation at Alexander since 1857. The community was made a CDP prior to the 2020 census.

== Demographics ==
Historical population
Census	Pop.	Note	%±
2020	155		—
U.S. Decennial Census

Alexander first appeared as a census designated place in the 2020 U.S. census.
