= Edward Rummel =

American politician

15th Illinois Secretary of State
- In office 1869–1873
- Governor: John M. Palmer
- Preceded by: Sharon Tyndale
- Succeeded by: George H. Harlow

Personal details
- Born: c. 1838 Grand Duchy of Baden
- Died: September 7, 1894 (aged 55 or 56) Chicago, Illinois, U.S.
- Party: Republican (Early years)
- Other political affiliations: Democrat (Later years)
- Profession: Politician, Printer, Newspaper Owner

Edward Rummel (c. 1838 – September 7, 1894) was the 15th Secretary of State of Illinois from 1869 to 1873. His tenure is notable for devising a more systematic method of record keeping that was required by the role of Illinois Secretary of State along with recommending a manual of state government.

== Early life ==
Rummel was born in Baden, Germany, in 1838, and emigrated to America at the age of 13. Shortly after arriving, he took up an apprenticeship with a printer based in Chicago. Rummel went on to become editor of the Chicago Republican.

In 1858, Rummel moved from Chicago to Peoria, where he became co-owner of a newspaper named the Illinois Banner. Two years later, in 1860, he renamed the newspaper Die Peoria Deutsche Zeitung. It continued in publication until 1878, when it was consolidated into a larger publication along with several other local newspapers.

== Political career ==
Rummel was elected as the Secretary of State of Illinois in 1869 and is remembered for reducing the cost of public printing as well as his dedication to records management.

Party political offices
Preceded by Sharon Tyndale	Republican nominee for Secretary of State of Illinois; 1868	Succeeded by George H. Harlow
Political offices
Preceded by Sharon Tyndale	Secretary of State of Illinois; 1869–1873	Succeeded by George H. Harlow
