= Sharon Tyndale =

American politician (1816–1871)

Sharon Tyndale (January 19, 1816 – April 29, 1871) was an American politician and designer who was the Secretary of State of Illinois, from 1865 to 1869. His tenure is notable for his redesign of the Great Seal of the State of Illinois.

== Early life and early career ==
Born on January 19, 1816, in Philadelphia, Tyndale moved to Belleville, Illinois in 1833 and worked in the mercantile business. He moved back to Philadelphia and worked in the mercantile business with his father. In 1845, he moved to Peoria, Illinois and studied to be a civil engineer. In 1857, Tyndale was elected County Surveyor of St. Clair County, Illinois. President Abraham Lincoln appointed Tyndale postmaster of Belleville, Illinois in 1861. From 1865 to 1869, Tyndale served as Illinois Secretary of State, as a Republican. After Tyndale left office, he stayed in Springfield, Illinois and worked for Gilman, Clinton and Springfield Railroad doing a survey. His brother was Hector Tyndale, a United States Army officer.

== Seal of the State of Illinois ==
In 1867, Tyndale himself requested that the Illinois General Assembly authorize a redesign of the seal, with one key suggestion, that the words of the motto (State Sovereignty, National Union) be reversed (to National Union, State Sovereignty). The legislature did authorize the redesign but specifically required the redesign to maintain the motto's word order. Then they gave Tyndale responsibility for the redesign. Tyndale overhauled the Great Seal, but he did so in a manner that appeared to thwart the legislature's intent. His new seal featured a twisted banner, which caused the word "sovereignty" to be upside down, albeit in the order required by the legislature. Tyndale's banner has remained in place, with only minor changes, since 1868.

== Assassination ==
Two years after leaving office, Tyndale was assassinated outside his home, in Springfield, Illinois, on April 29, 1871, aged 55. His killer was never identified.

== See also ==
- List of unsolved murders (before 1900)

== Notes ==
Party political offices
Preceded by Ozias M. Hatch	Republican nominee for Secretary of State of Illinois; 1868	Succeeded by Edward Rummel
Political offices
Preceded by Ozias M. Hatch	Secretary of State of Illinois; 1865–1869	Succeeded by Edward Rummel
