= Alexander Starne =

American politician

Treasurer of Illinois
- In office 1863–1865
- Governor: Richard Yates
- Preceded by: William Butler
- Succeeded by: James H. Beveridge

12th Illinois Secretary of State
- In office 1853–1857
- Governor: Joel Aldrich Matteson
- Preceded by: David L. Gregg
- Succeeded by: Ozias M. Hatch

Personal details
- Born: November 21, 1813 Philadelphia, Pennsylvania, U.S.
- Died: March 31, 1886 (aged 73) Springfield, Illinois, U.S.
- Party: Democratic
- Spouse: Elvira S. Swetland
- Profession: Merchant

Alexander Starne (November 21, 1813 – March 31, 1886) was an American politician from Pennsylvania. He moved to Illinois as a young man and rose to become both 12th Secretary of State of Illinois and 12th Treasurer of State of Illinois.

== Biography ==
Alexander Starne was born on November 21, 1813, in Philadelphia, Pennsylvania. He attended public schools until he was sixteen and then became a clerk at the T. W. Dyott drug store. After working there for seven years, he moved to Alton, Illinois, in 1836. He soon relocated to Griggsville, where he opened a general merchandise store. Starne was elected Commissioner of Pike County in 1839 and served for three years. He was then elected as a Democrat to the Illinois House of Representatives, where he served two two-year terms.

Starne moved to Pittsfield and was appointed Clerk of the Pike County Circuit Court. He was elected Illinois Secretary of State in 1852, serving one term under Governor Joel Aldrich Matteson. When the Republican Party came to power in 1856, Starne was replaced with a Republican candidate. He was a delegate at large to the 1856 Presidential Election, supporting Stephen A. Douglas and John A. Quitman. Douglas later withdrew in favor of eventual nominees James Buchanan, who won. Starne became President of the Hannibal and Naples Railroad in 1856, moving back to Griggsville. He saw through the completion of the railroad, which later became part of the Wabash Railway. Starne chaired the State Democratic Convention in 1858.

In 1861, Starne was elected a delegate to the State Constitutional Convention. The next year, he was elected Illinois Treasurer, a position he held for one year under Republican governor Richard Yates Sr. Starne moved to Springfield, the state capitol, where he spent the rest of his life. Starne was selected as an at-large delegate to the 1864 Presidential Election, supporting George B. McClellan, the eventual nominee. He supported John D. Caton as vice presidential nominee. He was elected to the Illinois Senate in 1870 and served two two-year terms. Starne was also the longtime owner of the West End Coal Mines as Starne & Sons.

He married Rebecca Hatch on September 23, 1840. She died six years later and Starne remarried to Elvira S. Swetland. He had one daughter by his first marriage and three sons and one daughter by his second. He died on March 31, 1886, and is buried in Oak Ridge Cemetery.

Party political offices
Preceded by Hugh Maher	Democratic nominee for Illinois Treasurer; 1862, 1864	Succeeded by Jesse J. Phillips
Political offices
Preceded by David L. Gregg	Secretary of State of Illinois; 1853–1857	Succeeded by Ozias M. Hatch
Preceded by William Butler	Treasurer of Illinois; 1863–1865	Succeeded by James H. Beveridge
