= George Forquer =

American politician (1794–1837)

George Forquer (1794–1837) was an American politician who served variously as an Illinois State Senator, Illinois' 5th Secretary of State (1825–1828) and Illinois 5th Attorney General (1829–1832). He was influential in creating the Illinois State Library, in part from a donation of his own personal collection. He also laid out and founded the town of Waterloo, Illinois.

Forquer was the older half-brother of Thomas Ford, who was the state's governor from 1842 to 1846. The two shared a law office in Edwardsville, and Forquer aided Ford in his early years as a lawyer and judge.

While in the state senate, Forquer proposed a loan of half a million dollars for the Illinois and Michigan Canal.

== 1836 debate ==
Forquer is chiefly remembered for an 1836 speech in the Springfield Court House that backfired on him, soon after he had changed his party affiliation from Whig to Democrat. Seven Whig candidates for election to the State Legislature were there, as well as seven Democrats. Among the candidates was a young lawyer seeking re-election, Abraham Lincoln. After Lincoln's speech, Forquer, although not a candidate, asked to speak for the Democrats.

"The young man will have to be taken down," Forquer said, referring to Lincoln, and asserted that the task had fallen to him, Lincoln's superior.

Literary scholar Robert Bray has characterized Lincoln's famous rebuttal as a "withering put-down...as figuratively brilliant as it was cruelly ad hominem".

"The gentleman has seen fit to allude to my being a young man; but he forgets that I am older in years than I am in the tricks and trades of politicians. I desire to live, and I desire place and distinction; but I would rather die now than, like the gentleman, live to see the day that I would change my politics for an office worth three thousand dollars a year, and then feel compelled to erect a lightning-rod over my house to protect a guilty conscience from an offended God!"

== Death and legacy ==
Forquer Street in Chicago is named in his honor.

Political offices
Preceded by Morris Birkbeck	Illinois Secretary of State; 1825 - 1828	Succeeded by Alexander P. Field
Preceded by James Turney	Illinois Attorney General; 1829 - 1832	Succeeded by James Semple
