= George H. Harlow =

American politician

16th Illinois Secretary of State
- In office 1873–1881
- Governor: Richard J. Oglesby; John L. Beveridge; Shelby M. Cullom
- Preceded by: Edward Rummel
- Succeeded by: Henry D. Dement

Personal details
- Born: September 5, 1830 Sackett's Harbor, New York, U.S.
- Died: May 16, 1900 (aged 69) Highland Park, Illinois, U.S.
- Party: Republican

George H. Harlow (September 5, 1830 – May 16, 1900) was an American politician. Born in New York, he was originally a student of carpentry and architecture. He entered the mercantile business soon after he moved to Pekin, Illinois. In 1860, he was elected clerk of the circuit court, then co-founded a Union League of America chapter, later serving at the state level of the organization. Harlow was the personal secretary to Governor Richard J. Oglesby and oversaw Camp Butler starting in 1864. He was elected assistant Illinois Secretary of State for four years starting in 1868, then was the secretary from 1872 to 1880. After his terms expired, he traded commodities in Chicago.

== Biography ==
George H. Harlow was born in Sackett's Harbor, New York, on September 5, 1830. He was the eldest son born to Davis and Mercy Harlow. He attended public schools, then apprenticed as a builder. Harlow studied architecture under Otis L. Wheelock, who worked at the time in Watertown, New York. In March 1854, Harlow moved to Pekin, Illinois, to establish a carpentry and architecture shop. However, after only a year, he decided instead to study at a mercantile business. He became a successful grain merchant and also became active in local politics, helping establish the Republican party in the town and turning his office into county headquarters for distribution of Republican party literature.

In 1860, Harlow was elected clerk of the Tazewell County circuit court as a Republican. He also served a term as an alderman on the Pekin city council. With the outbreak of the Civil War, Harlow helped to raise volunteers for the Union Army. He co-organized the first county Union League and was named its secretary. He then was named secretary of the state-level organization. He was nominated for re-election as circuit court clerk in 1864, but was defeated. In January 1865, he was elected first assistant secretary of the Illinois Senate, but before he could take office, Governor Richard J. Oglesby appointed Harlow his private secretary, and in August 1865 Oglesby appointed him assistant inspector general. Oglesby commissioned Harlow an Illinois colonel and tasked him with the oversight of Camp Butler in Springfield. While there, Harlow edited the Illinois State Journal.

Harlow ran for Illinois Secretary of State in 1868, but the Republican Party instead decided to put Edward Rummel on the ticket. However, Harlow was named Assistant Secretary of State. Four years later, Harlow received the party nomination and defeated his opponent. He served two consecutive four-year terms. He then moved to Chicago to engage in the commission business on the Chicago Board of Trade.

He died on May 16, 1900, at his home in Highland Park, Illinois.

Party political offices
Preceded by Edward Rummel	Republican nominee for Secretary of State of Illinois; 1872, 1876	Succeeded by Henry D. Dement
Political offices
Preceded by Edward Rummel	Secretary of State of Illinois; 1856–1864	Succeeded by Henry D. Dement
