= David Blackwell (politician) =

American politician

David Blackwell was an American politician who served as the 3rd Illinois Secretary of State and the first Democratic speaker of the Illinois House of Representatives.

== Biography ==
Blackwell was born around 1792. In 1818, he moved from Kentucky to Belleville, Illinois. In the 1820 general election, he was elected to the Illinois House of Representatives and sworn in on December 4, 1820.

Governor Edward Coles appointed Blackwell Illinois Secretary of State on April 2, 1823. Blackwell's goal in the position was to prevent a constitutional convention in which pro-slavery forces could reverse Illinois' de jure status as a free state. This goal, achieved in part by Blackwell's control of the Illinois Intelligencer, was accomplished when the referendum failed. Blackwell resigned as Secretary of State on October 15, 1824.

After his time as Secretary of State, Blackwell returned to the Illinois House of Representatives for the 4th General Assembly which commenced November 15, 1824. On January 2, 1826, he was elected Speaker of the Illinois House of Representatives to replace Thomas Mather who resigned to take a job to locate a military road. He was reelected to the 5th General Assembly which convened December 4, 1826. The session adjourned February 19, 1827, and the assembly ended December 1, 1828.

Blackwell died on March 28, 1832, in Belleville, Illinois.
