= Ozias M. Hatch =

American politician

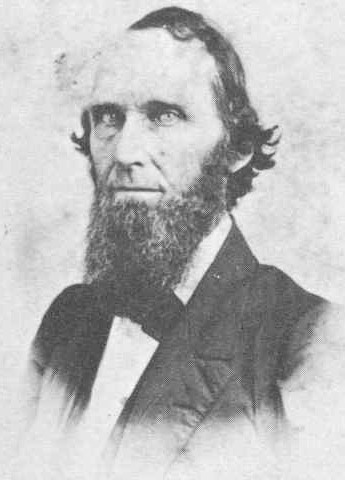

13th Illinois Secretary of State
- In office 1856–1864
- Governor: Joel Aldrich Matteson; William Henry Bissell; John Wood; Richard Yates
- Preceded by: Alexander Starne
- Succeeded by: Sharon Tyndale

Personal details
- Born: Ozias Mather Hatch; April 11, 1814 Hillsboro Center, New Hampshire, U.S.
- Died: March 12, 1893 (aged 78) Springfield, Illinois, U.S.
- Party: Republican
- Other political affiliations: Whig
- Spouse: Julia R. Enos
- Profession: Judge, merchant

Ozias Mather Hatch (April 11, 1814 – March 12, 1893) was an American politician. He was the 13th Illinois Secretary of State, serving under William Henry Bissell, John Wood, and Richard Yates Sr. During the governorship of Wood, Hatch handled most of the duties of Governor of Illinois.

== Biography ==
Ozias Mather Hatch was born in Hillsboro Center, New Hampshire, on April 11, 1814, to Dr. Reuben and Ann Hatch. He was the third-born of eight sons and three daughters. His father, a physician in New Hampshire for over 30 years, wanted young Ozias to enter the medical profession as well, but Ozias opted to seek a job in business and left home for Boston at the age of 15. There he worked as a grocery store clerk for seven years. In 1836, he rejoined his family in Griggsville, Illinois. He formed a partnership with his brother Isaac and David Hoyt, opening the Isaac A. Hatch & Co. general merchandise store. The store was dissolved in the aftermath of the Panic of 1837.

Hatch opened his own general merchandise store with Solomon McNeil as McNeil & Hatch in Pittsfield, Illinois. He co-managed it until 1841, when he retired to accept a position on the Pike County circuit court. He served on the court under Samuel D. Lockwood for seven years. After his term, he joined his brother R. B. to form R. B. Hatch & Co. in Meredosia. In 1851, he was elected to the Illinois House of Representatives, serving one two-year term. During the formation of the Republican Party at the Bloomington Convention, Hatch was named their nominee for Illinois Secretary of State due to his abolitionist views. He was elected in 1856 by a significant margin, serving under William Henry Bissell.

Bissell died in 1860, and Lieutenant Governor John Wood became the new Governor. However, Wood had business interests in Quincy, Illinois, and spent little time governing the state. Hatch then became the de facto Governor of Illinois. Hatch was re-elected as Secretary of State later that year and served his second term under Richard Yates Sr. This term coincided with the American Civil War, and Hatch oversaw the raising of troops. It was on the recommendation of Hatch and Judge Jesse K. DuBois that Yates appointed Ulysses S. Grant – then an unknown colonel – to head one of the Illinois regiments. Hatch also visited soldiers in the field, mostly traveling with President Abraham Lincoln to inspect the Army of the Potomac. He also used his influence to protect the career of his younger brother, quartermaster Lt. Col. Reuben Hatch [died 1871], who was involved in the death of 1700 Union prisoners on the Sultana. Hatch co-founded the Hannibal and Naples Railroad in 1863, which was later purchased by the Wabash Railway.

Hatch declined re-election and retired from politics in 1865. After Lincoln was assassinated, Hatch traveled along the East Coast to procure funding for the Lincoln Tomb in Springfield. He founded a large farm in Sangamon County and became vice president and director of the Sangamon Loan and Trust Company. He founded the Hatch & Brother bank in Griggsville with his brother Isaac in 1870. Hatch died at his home in Springfield on March 12, 1893.

== Personal ==
Hatch married Julia R. Enos, daughter of Pascal P. Enos, one of the co-founders of Springfield, in 1860. They had three children.

Party political offices
First	Republican nominee for Secretary of State of Illinois; 1856, 1860	Succeeded by Sharon Tyndale
Political offices
Preceded by Alexander Starne	Secretary of State of Illinois; 1856–1864	Succeeded by Sharon Tyndale
