= Isaac N. Pearson =

American politician

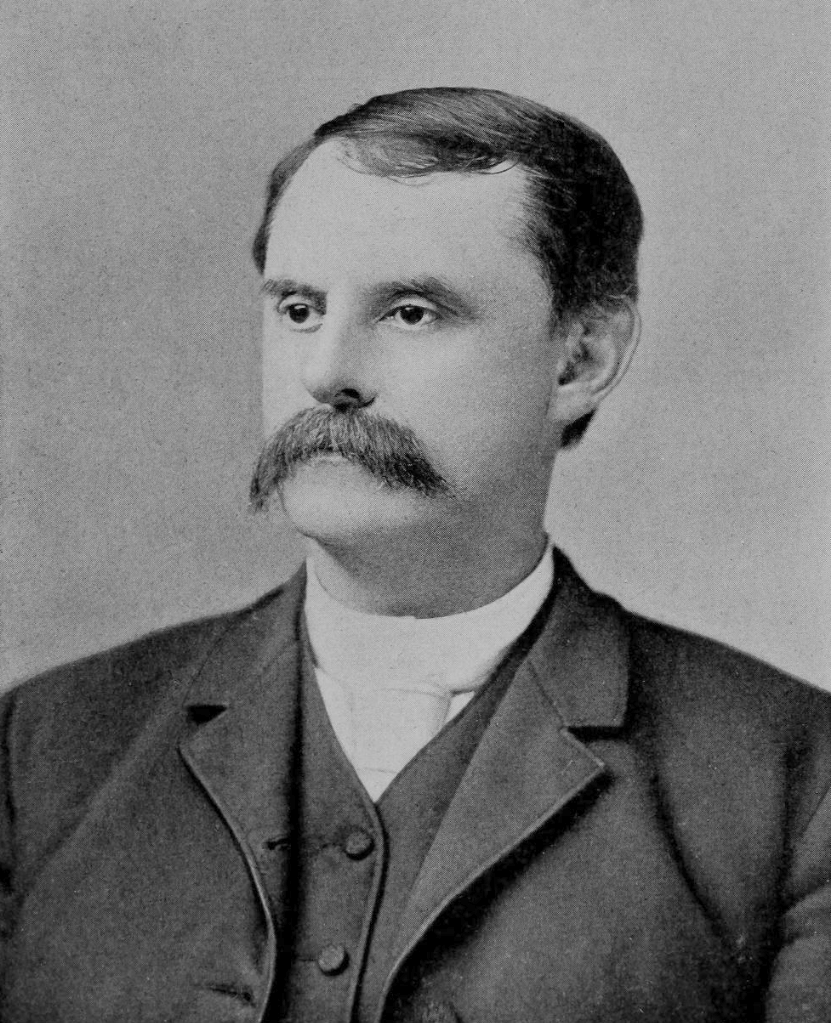

18th Illinois Secretary of State
- In office 1888–1892
- Governor: Joseph W. Fifer
- Preceded by: Henry D. Dement
- Succeeded by: William H. Hinrichsen

Member of the Illinois Senate from the 27th district
- In office 1886–1888
- Preceded by: Henry Tubbs
- Succeeded by: William J. Frisbee

Member of the Illinois House of Representatives from the 27th district
- In office 1882–1884

Personal details
- Born: July 27, 1842 Centerville, Pennsylvania, U.S.
- Died: February 27, 1908 (aged 65) Macomb, Illinois, U.S.
- Party: Republican
- Spouse(s): Jennie M. Robinson, Mary E. Kerman
- Relations: Isaac S. Pearson (father)
- Profession: Court clerk, banker

Isaac Newton Pearson (July 27, 1842 – February 27, 1908) was an American politician from Pennsylvania. Though born the son of a prominent politician, Newton's mother was soon widowed and moved the family to Illinois. Pearson started in politics as a clerk in the McDonough County, Illinois, circuit court. He was elected to the Illinois House of Representatives for one term, then to the Illinois Senate. In 1888, he was elected Illinois Secretary of State, a position he held for four years. He then returned to his business interests in Macomb, Illinois.

== Biography ==
Isaac Newton Pearson was born in Centerville, Butler County, Pennsylvania, on July 27, 1842. He was the youngest of seven children born to Isaac S. Pearson, who was active in Pennsylvania politics as a Whig. However, he died in 1845. Isaac's widowed mother first moved the family to New Castle, Pennsylvania, shortly after his death, then to Illinois in 1849. They first settled near La Harpe, Illinois, then moved to Macomb, Illinois in 1858. Pearson attended public schools in these two towns and helped to make ends meet by farming, chopping wood, and tending gardens.

By the time the Civil War broke out in 1861, Pearson was working in the office of the clerk of the circuit court. He lost the position for political reasons in 1864—Pearson was a Republican and the Democrats had just come to power—so then he worked in a banking house in Bushnell, Illinois. In 1868, the Republicans again came to power in McDonough County and he resumed work as deputy clerk.

In 1872, the local Republican Party nominated Pearson as their candidate for circuit clerk. He was elected and was subsequently re-elected in 1876, serving a total of eight years. As his second term was expiring, he was named cashier of the Union National Bank of Macomb. Pearson was elected to the Illinois House of Representatives in 1882 and served a two-year term; he was also named a vice president of the bank. He advocated for the state appointment of Inspectors of Coal Mines. He was the Republican nominee for Illinois Senate in 1886 and won in a tight race.

Pearson was the Republican nominee as Illinois Secretary of State in 1888, as well as its candidate for state senate. Pearson won both elections and resigned his senate position to become Secretary. He was re-elected in 1892, but was defeated by Democrat William H. Hinrichsen. Pearson then returned to Macomb to manage his business interests. Aside from the bank, he was a director of the Macomb Pottery Company and the Macomb Electric Light & Gas Company. He also maintained large land holdings.

Pearson married Jennie M. Robinson, the daughter of the late Democratic U.S. Representative James Carroll Robinson, in 1894. However, she died the following September. He then married Mary E. Kerman. Pearson was a member of the Ancient Order of United Workmen, the Knights of Pythias, and the Independent Order of Odd Fellows. He died at his home in Macomb on February 27, 1908.

Party political offices
Preceded by Henry D. Dement	Republican nominee for Secretary of State of Illinois; 1888, 1892	Succeeded by James A. Rose
Political offices
Preceded by Henry D. Dement	Secretary of State of Illinois; 1889–1893	Succeeded by William H. Hinrichsen
