= Secretary of State of Illinois =

Elected political office in Illinois

- Great Seal of the State of Illinois

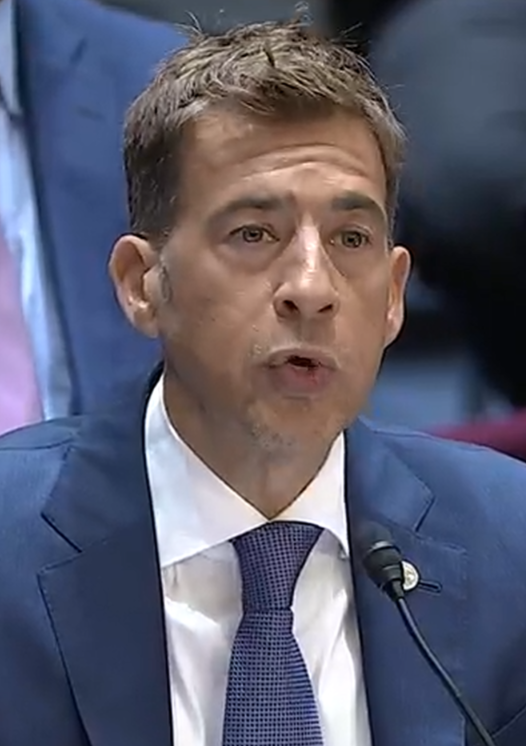
- Incumbent; Alexi Giannoulias since January 9, 2023
- Term length: 4 years, unlimited term
- Inaugural holder: Elias Kane
- Formation: 1818; 208 years ago
- Succession: Third
- Website: ilsos.gov

The secretary of state of Illinois is one of the six elected executive state offices of the government of Illinois, and one of the 47 secretaries of state in the United States. The Illinois secretary of state keeps the state records, laws, library, and archives, and is the state's corporation registration, vehicle registration and driver licensing authority. The current secretary of state is Alexi Giannoulias, a Democrat who took office in 2023.

== Powers and duties ==
The secretary of state, in accordance with the state constitution, is keeper of the official acts of the General Assembly, the official records of the executive branch, and the Great Seal of Illinois. These duties have remained unchanged since Illinois became a U.S. state in 1818. The secretary also registers corporations and lobbyists, commissions notaries public, and regulates the securities industry, among connected responsibilities.

The secretary of state performs other duties prescribed by law. For instance, the secretary oversees the state archives and the state library. The State Archives serves as the official depository of state agency and local government records that possess administrative, legal, or historic research value. The State Library houses more than 5,000,000 items, and other informational resources, and oversees a consortium of academic and regional libraries in the state. In addition, the secretary is the custodian of the Illinois State Capitol and all state buildings.

By statute, the secretary of state is also tasked with issuing licenses to Illinois drivers and registering motor vehicles operated in the state, effectively making the secretary of state's office the department of motor vehicles, though that phrase is not used in Illinois. Enforcement of these duties has made the secretary of state's office a key bureau in the enforcement of laws against driving under the influence. Illinois is one of only three states to put the secretary of state in charge of motor vehicle registration, the other two being Maine and Michigan.

Aside from routine responsiblilities, the secretary of state is third (behind the lieutenant governor and attorney general, respectively) in the line of succession to the office of Governor of Illinois.

== Police ==
=== Secretary of State Police ===
The Secretary of State Police of Illinois is a statewide police force, established in 1913; it is responsible for enforcing the laws of the Illinois Vehicle Code such as regulating businesses involved with the sale of motor vehicles and vehicle parts. Its main purpose is to protect consumers against fraud through adherence to state statutes.

The Secretary of State Police also investigates identity theft, maintains statewide vehicle inspection stations, investigates statewide vehicle thefts, provides statewide school bus regulation, enforces traffic and parking violations and provides law enforcement to all secretary of state facilities.

=== Illinois State Capitol Police ===
The Secretary of State Police also maintains the Illinois State Capitol Police, responsible for policing the Illinois State Capitol Complex in Springfield, including both the Capitol and 16 surrounding state buildings. The force was created following a 2004 incident in which an unarmed security guard was shot and killed. The force has an authorised strength of 60 officers.

== Facilities ==
The secretary of state's office occupies three buildings of the Illinois State Capitol Complex in Springfield. Many of the secretary of state's workers assigned to motor vehicle and licensing duties work in the Howlett Building, south of the Capitol. The Howlett Building is named after former secretary of state Michael Howlett. The State Archives are housed in the Norton Building, southwest of the Capitol. The Illinois State Library is located in the Brooks Library, east of the Capitol, which is named for longtime state Poet Laureate Gwendolyn Brooks, winner of the Pulitzer Prize in 1950.

In addition, the secretary of state operates 136 Driver Services license-issuing facilities statewide and maintains its own police force. Established in 1913, their duties include enforcement of the Illinois Vehicle Code on businesses regulated by the secretary of state and maintaining public safety, traffic control and assisting other law enforcement agencies.

== Officeholders ==
To be eligible to take the oath of office as secretary of state, an individual must be a United States citizen, at least 25 years of age, and a resident of Illinois for at least three years preceding the election.

On January 9, 2023, Jesse White, a Democrat, completed his sixth term as the 39th secretary of state, the first African-American in the position and by far longest-serving secretary in Illinois history. Before being elected Secretary of State in November 1998, White had been an elected office-holder from Chicago since 1974. White, who decided to retire at the end of his sixth term at the age of 88, was succeeded by Alexi Giannoulias, who won the 2022 election and became the 38th secretary.

The secretary of state before White was George Ryan, a Republican from Kankakee, Illinois. He held the office from 1991 to 1999, when he became Governor of Illinois. Ryan's tenure as secretary of state led to his downfall in the "licenses for bribes" scandal: after a major automobile accident in Wisconsin that killed six children, investigators discovered that unqualified truck drivers were receiving drivers licenses in exchange for bribes. Ryan chose not to run for re-election in 2002, and in 2006, he was convicted of fraud, including using his authority as secretary of state to end his office's internal investigation after it discovered the scheme.

This is a list of all the people who have served as Illinois Territorial Secretary and people who have served as Illinois Secretary of State.

#	Image	Name	Term	Party
1		Nathaniel Pope	1809-1816	Democratic-Republican
2		Joseph Phillips	1816–1818	Democratic-Republican
3		Elias Kane	1818–1822	Democratic-Republican
4		Samuel D. Lockwood	1822–1823	Democratic-Republican
5		David Blackwell	1823–1824	Democratic-Republican
6		Morris Birkbeck	1824–1825	Democratic-Republican
7		George Forquer	1825–1828	Democratic-Republican
8		Alexander Pope Field	1829–1840	Democratic
9		Stephen A. Douglas	1840–1841	Democratic
10		Lyman Trumbull	1841–1843	Democratic
11		Thompson Campbell	1843–1846	Democratic
12		Horace S. Cooley	1846–1850	Democratic
13		David L. Gregg	1850–1853	Democratic
14		Alexander Starne	1853–1857	Democratic
15		Ozias M. Hatch	1857–1865	Republican
16		Sharon Tyndale	1865–1869	Republican
17		Edward Rummel	1869–1873	Republican
18		George H. Harlow	1873–1881	Republican
19		Henry D. Dement	1881–1889	Republican
20		Isaac N. Pearson	1889–1893	Republican
21		William H. Hinrichsen	1893–1897	Democratic
22		James A. Rose	1897–1912	Republican
23		Cornelius J. Doyle	1912–1913	Republican
24		Harry Woods	1913–1914	Democratic
25		Lewis Stevenson	1914–1917	Democratic
26		Louis Lincoln Emmerson	1917–1929	Republican
27		William J. Stratton	1929–1933	Republican
28		Edward J. Hughes	1933–1944	Democratic
29		Richard Yates Rowe	1944–1945	Republican
30		Edward J. Barrett	1945–1953	Democratic
31		Charles F. Carpentier	1953–1964	Republican
32		William H. Chamberlain	1964–1965	Democratic
33		Paul Powell	1965–1970	Democratic
34		John W. Lewis Jr.	1970–1973	Republican
35		Michael Howlett	1973–1977	Democratic
36		Alan J. Dixon	1977–1981	Democratic
37		Jim Edgar	1981–1991	Republican
38		George Ryan	1991–1999	Republican
39		Jesse White	1999–2023	Democratic
40		Alexi Giannoulias	2023–present	Democratic

== Seal of Illinois ==
The official motto of the state of Illinois is "State Sovereignty - National Union". The Illinois secretary of state in 1867, Sharon Tyndale, as the keeper of the Great Seal of Illinois, had it re-engraved so that the word "sovereignty" was upside down. This 1867 seal redesign continues in use to this day, and can be seen, among other places, as the principal device on the flag of Illinois.

== See also ==
- Governor of Illinois
- Lieutenant Governor of Illinois
- Illinois Attorney General
- Comptroller of Illinois
- Treasurer of Illinois
