= 13th Illinois Infantry Regiment =

13th Regiment Illinois Volunteer Infantry
- Illinois state flag
- Active: 1861–1864
- Country: United States
- Allegiance: Union
- Branch: United States Army; Union Army
- Type: Infantry
- Engagements: American Civil War: Battle of Chickasaw Bayou (1862); Siege of Vicksburg (1863); Battle of Bentonville (1865)

The 13th Regiment Illinois Volunteer Infantry, nicknamed "Fremont's Grey Hounds," was an infantry regiment that served in the Union Army during the American Civil War. The Thirteenth was one of the regiments organized under the act known as the Ten Regiment Bill.

== Service ==
The 13th Illinois Infantry was mustered into federal service by Captain John Pope at Camp Dement, Dixon, Illinois, on May 24, 1861, for a three-year term. The Thirteenth was the first Regiment organized from the Second Congressional District of Northern Illinois.

In June, the regiment was ordered to Caseyville, Illinois, 10 miles east of St. Louis, and by July 5, had arrived at Rolla, Missouri, where it remained until the spring of 1862. While stationed at Rolla, the regiment was deployed to guard the supply trains to and from General Lyon's army, from guerrilla bands in that part of the state a small detachment took part at the battle of Wilson's Creek. The Thirteenth was also part of General Fremont's force that went to Springfield, Missouri, in the fall of 1861. In 1862 the regiment joined General Curtis' army at Pea Ridge, Missouri, 250 miles southwest of Rolla, in his march from Pea Ridge to Helena, Arkansas, on the Mississippi River.

The regiment was part of General Sherman's army in his attack on Chickasaw Bayou, and on the first day of battle at the Bayou, Colonel Wyman was killed. The Thirteenth was also present at the capture of Arkansas Post, and was successful in a raid in Greenville, Mississippi.

The regiment was mustered out on June 18, 1864.

== Total strength and casualties ==
The regiment suffered 6 officers and 61 enlisted men who were killed in action or who died of their wounds and 2 officers and 123 enlisted men who died of disease, for a total of 192 fatalities.

== Infantry field and staff ==
- Colonel John B. Wyman - killed at the Battle of Chickasaw Bayou December 28, 1862.
- Colonel Adam B. Gorgas - Mustered out June 18, 1864
- Lt. Colonel Benjamin F. Parks - Resigned June 25, 1861
- Lt. Colonel William Frederick Partridge - Mustered out June 18, 1864
- Major James M. Beardsley - Mustered out June 18, 1864
- Major Douglas R. Bushnell- Killed Ringgold, Georgia November 27, 1863
- Quartermaster William C. Henderson - Resigned July 28, 1863
- Quartermaster John S. McClary - Mustered out June 18, 1864
- Adjutant Henry T. Porter - Mustered out June 18, 1864
- Major Samuel C. Plummer - Mustered out June 18, 1864

== See also ==
- List of Illinois Civil War Units
- Illinois in the American Civil War
