= John Dement =

American politician and militia commander

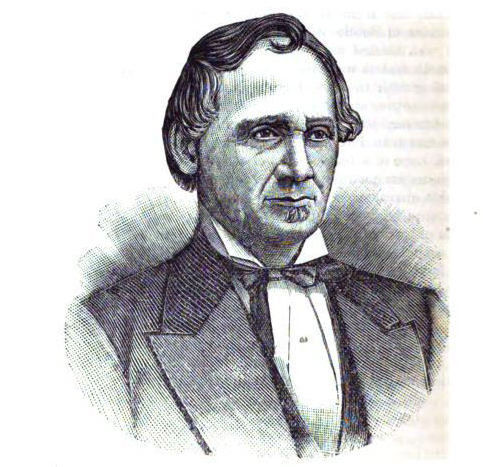
- An 1887 engraving of John Dement
- Born: 26 April 1804; Gallatin, Tennessee
- Died: 16 January 1883 (aged 78); Dixon, Illinois
- Relatives: Son: Henry Dodge Dement
- Military career
- Allegiance: United States
- Branch: Illinois Militia
- Service years: 1832
- Rank: Colonel
- Units: Fayette County Volunteer Company, Spy Battalion First Regiment Illinois Militia
- Conflicts: Second Battle of Kellogg's Grove, (Black Hawk War)
- Other work: Illinois State Representative; U.S. Receiver of Public Moneys; Illinois Constitutional Convention Delegate; Electoral College elector

John Dement (26 April 1804 – 16 January 1883) was an American politician and militia commander from the U.S. state of Illinois.

Born in Tennessee, he migrated with his family to Illinois when he was in his early teens. His first political office was as county sheriff and he later served multiple terms in the Illinois House of Representatives. Dement held the federal Receiver of Public Moneys post with the United States General Land Office under five different presidential administrations. During the 1832 Black Hawk War, Dement commanded a battalion in combat at the Second Battle of Kellogg's Grove. Sauk war chief Black Hawk later commented on the valor displayed by Dement during the battle. Dement died in 1883 at his home in Dixon, Illinois.

== Early life ==
John Dement was born in Gallatin, Sumner County, Tennessee on April 26, 1804. His parents, David and Dorcas Dement (née Willis) moved to Illinois in 1817 and he moved with them; the family settled on a farm in Franklin County.

== Political career ==
In 1826 Dement took his first political office when he was elected sheriff of Franklin County. He went on and served the same area in the Illinois House of Representatives from 1828 to 1830. The General Assembly elected Dement state Treasurer in 1831, and he was reelected twice, until he resigned the post to serve in the General Assembly once again in 1836, as state representative from Fayette County, where the county seat of Vandalia was about to lose its position as capital of Illinois.

By 1837, Springfield had become the capital of Illinois, and Dement, unable to prevent the move, resigned his General Assembly seat and moved toward the northern mining region near Galena. The same year, Dement began his career in U.S. federal government when U.S. President Andrew Jackson appointed him Receiver of Public Moneys. Dement held the position through the administration of Martin Van Buren until, in 1841 succeeding President William Harrison removed him from the post. During the election of 1844 he served as district elector to the Electoral College from Illinois for James K. Polk and George M. Dallas. When Polk took office in 1845 he appointed Dement, once again, to the position of Receiver of Public Moneys. Zachary Taylor removed Dement from his position again in 1849, and Franklin Pierce reappointed Dement to the post in 1853. Dement continued to serve as Receiver of Public Moneys under U.S. President James Buchanan, until the position was abolished in 1861.

In another capacity, Dement was elected delegate to every Illinois Constitutional Convention during his lifetime, except the first in 1818, when Dement was 14 years old. At the conventions in 1862 and 1870 he was elected and served as president pro tempore.

== Militia service ==
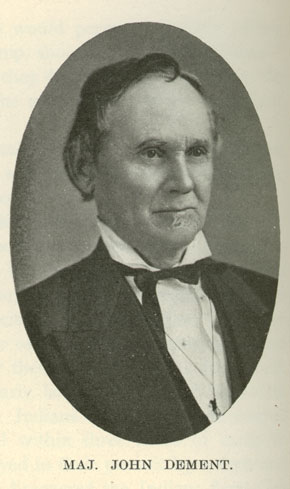
This portrait of Dement was published in Frank Stevens' 1903 book The Black Hawk War

Dement's political career was put on hold by the start of the 1832 Black Hawk War, which pitted the Illinois and Michigan Territory Militias against Sauk Chief Black Hawk and his band of warriors. Dement served in three separate capacities during the conflict, during which, he held three different military ranks. As a colonel Dement served as aide-de-camp for Illinois Governor John Reynolds. Dement also served as a captain, and a major. As a major Dement commanded a battalion during the Second Battle of Kellogg's Grove.

As captain, Dement led a Fayette County company of volunteers, formed on April 20, from Beardstown to Oquawka and the brigade of General Samuel Whiteside. The company then moved north toward the mouth of the Rock River. At the river, the company was mustered into federal service under General Henry Atkinson and marched on to Dixon and then Ottawa where they were mustered out of service on May 28. After the company was mustered out of service Dement offered to stay on duty until the new army, called up May 15, could arrive in the field June 10. Governor Reynolds responded to Dement's offer by appointing him to his staff and promoting him to the rank of colonel. The second army arrived on the Illinois frontier on June 19, 1832.

On June 16, 1832, Dement reenlisted in the Illinois Militia as a private. A spy battalion was formed on June 17 within the First Brigade of the Illinois Militia under the command of General Alexander Posey, and Dement was elected battalion commander. Governor Reynolds promoted him to major, and Dement took command of the battalion. Dement's command, 170 strong, set out for Kellogg's Grove on June 25 under orders from General Zachary Taylor.

Dement's actions at the Second Battle of Kellogg's Grove later earned him praise from his adversary, Black Hawk. Black Hawk stated of Dement in his autobiography:

The chief and his few braves were unwilling to leave the field. I ordered my braves to rush upon them, and had the mortification of seeing two of my chiefs killed before the enemy retreated. This young chief deserves great praise for his courage and bravery, but fortunately for us, his army was not all composed of such brave men.

During the battle, Dement's battalion lost five men with another three were wounded, many horses were killed as well. That night American reinforcements arrived under the command of General Posey, who chose not to pursue the attackers and instead reported the situation to Taylor. Black Hawk asserted later that had Posey chose to attack him and his warriors that the blow dealt Black Hawk's band would have been decisive and war-ending. In fact, Dement's opinion was that there were more Native Americans at Kellogg's Grove than at any other engagement during the war.

Dement's command served on active duty from its inception until the end of hostilities at the Battle of Bad Axe. The battalion was mustered out of service on August 7, 1832, which ended John Dement's military career.

== Dement Town ==
In 1849, while holding the United States General Land Office receiver post, Dement settled in Dixon, Illinois. Dement erected a residence and stone store and later Judge John D. Crabtree settled in the area. Near the center of the area settled by Dement was a well known area called Sandhill Grove. Sandhill Grove contained sandy soil, a large oak stand, and during certain seasons large flocks of cranes.

Dement helped to persuade the Illinois Central Railroad to locate its Dixon depot near the western edge of town when the railroad line was constructed in the early 1850s. The depot location was contrary to where most at the time thought it would be located, near the town's central business district. The depot's construction dramatically increased Dement's property value and much of his land was surveyed into town lots and sold off. The area, which was visibly separated from the rest of Dixon by the rail embankment and vacant lots, became known as Dement Town. The area prospered until Dement's death, when it began to decline. However, the section of Dixon known as Dement Town still exists.

== Late life and death ==
John Dement married Mary Lousie Dodge, daughter of Black Hawk War commander Henry Dodge, in 1835 at Fort Leavenworth. The couple had three children, a son, Henry Dodge Dement, who went on to serve as Illinois Secretary of State, and two daughters. John Dement died at his home in Dixon, Illinois on January 16, 1883.

== Notes ==
Political offices
Preceded by James Hall	Treasurer of Illinois; 1831–1836	Succeeded by Charles Gregory
