= List of elections in 1848 =

The following elections occurred in the year 1848.

== Africa ==
- French legislative election in Senegal

== Europe ==
- 1848 Belgian general election
- 1848 Cisleithanian legislative election
- 1848 Danish Constituent Assembly election
- 1848 Dutch general election
- France:
  - 1848 French Constituent Assembly election
  - 1848 French presidential election
- 1848 German federal election
- 1848 Hungarian parliamentary election
- 1848 Luxembourg general election
- 1848 Swiss federal election
- 1848 Swiss constitutional referendum

== North America ==
=== Canada ===
- 1848 Newfoundland general election

=== Central America ===
- 1848 Salvadoran presidential election

=== United States ===
- 1848 New York state election
- 1848 United States elections

==== United States Presidential ====
- 1848 United States presidential election

==== United States Senate ====
- 1848 and 1849 United States Senate elections
- 1848 United States Senate election in Wisconsin

==== United States House of Representatives ====
- 1848 United States House of Representatives elections
- 1848 United States House of Representatives election in Florida
- 1848 United States House of Representatives elections in Wisconsin

==== United States lieutenant gubernatorial ====
- 1848 Connecticut lieutenant gubernatorial election
- 1848 Illinois lieutenant gubernatorial election
- 1848 Missouri lieutenant gubernatorial election
- 1848 Wisconsin lieutenant gubernatorial election

==== United States gubernatorial ====
- 1848 Arkansas gubernatorial election
- 1848 Connecticut gubernatorial election
- 1848 Florida gubernatorial election
- 1848 Illinois gubernatorial election
- 1848 Kentucky gubernatorial election
- 1848 Maine gubernatorial election
- 1848-49 Massachusetts gubernatorial election
- 1848 Missouri gubernatorial election
- 1848 New Hampshire gubernatorial election
- 1848 New York gubernatorial election
- 1848 North Carolina gubernatorial election
- 1848 Ohio gubernatorial election
- 1848 Pennsylvania gubernatorial election
- 1848 Rhode Island gubernatorial election
- 1848 South Carolina gubernatorial election
- 1848 Vermont gubernatorial election
- 1848 Virginia gubernatorial election
- 1848 Wisconsin gubernatorial election

==== United States mayoral elections ====
- 1848 Boston mayoral election
- 1848 Chicago mayoral election
- 1848 Manchester, New Hampshire mayoral election
- 1848 Philadelphia mayoral election

== See also ==
- Category:1848 elections
