= 1848 Illinois lieutenant gubernatorial election =

- August 7, 1848

Nominee	William McMurtry	Henry H. Snow
Party	Democratic	Free Soil
Popular vote	65,304	5,251
Percentage	85.39%	6.87%
Lieutenant Governor before election
Joseph Wells
Democratic
Elected Lieutenant Governor
William McMurtry
Democratic

The 1848 Illinois lieutenant gubernatorial election was held on August 7, 1848, in order to elect the lieutenant governor of Illinois. Democratic nominee and former member of the Illinois Senate William McMurtry defeated Free Soil nominee Henry H. Snow and Whig candidates James L. D. Morrison and Orville Hickman Browning.

== General election ==
On election day, August 7, 1848, Democratic nominee William McMurtry won the election by a margin of 60,053 votes against his foremost opponent Free Soil nominee Henry H. Snow, thereby retaining Democratic control over the office of lieutenant governor. McMurtry was sworn in as the 11th lieutenant governor of Illinois on January 8, 1849.

=== Results ===
Illinois lieutenant gubernatorial election, 1848
Party	Candidate	Votes	%
Democratic	William McMurtry	65,304	85.39
Free Soil	Henry H. Snow	5,251	6.87
Whig	James L. D. Morrison	2,985	3.90
Whig	Orville Hickman Browning	2,939	3.84
Total votes		76,479	100.00
Democratic hold			

== See also ==
- 1848 Illinois gubernatorial election
