= 1838 Illinois lieutenant gubernatorial election =

- August 6, 1838

Nominee	Stinson Anderson	William H. Davidson
Party	Democratic	Whig
Popular vote	30,335	28,716
Percentage	51.35%	48.61%
Lieutenant Governor before election
William H. Davidson (Acting)
Democratic
Elected Lieutenant Governor
Stinson Anderson
Democratic

The 1838 Illinois lieutenant gubernatorial election was held on August 6, 1838, in order to elect the lieutenant governor of Illinois. Democratic nominee and former member of the Illinois House of Representatives Stinson Anderson defeated Whig nominee and incumbent acting lieutenant governor William H. Davidson.

== General election ==
On election day, August 6, 1838, Democratic nominee Stinson Anderson won the election by a margin of 1,619 votes against his opponent Whig nominee William H. Davidson, thereby retaining Democratic control over the office of lieutenant governor. Anderson was sworn in as the 8th lieutenant governor of Illinois on December 7, 1838.

=== Results ===
Illinois lieutenant gubernatorial election, 1838
Party	Candidate	Votes	%
Democratic	Stinson Anderson	30,335	51.35
Whig	William H. Davidson (incumbent)	28,716	48.61
Write-in		22	0.04
Total votes		59,073	100.00
Democratic hold			

== See also ==
- 1838 Illinois gubernatorial election
