= 1846 Illinois lieutenant gubernatorial election =

- August 3, 1846

Nominee	Joseph Wells	Nathaniel G. Wilcox	Abraham Smith
Party	Democratic	Whig	Free Soil
Popular vote	57,457	36,155	5,179
Percentage	58.13%	36.58%	5.24%
Lieutenant Governor before election
John Moore
Democratic
Elected Lieutenant Governor
Joseph Wells
Democratic

The 1846 Illinois lieutenant gubernatorial election was held on August 3, 1846, in order to elect the lieutenant governor of Illinois. Democratic nominee Joseph Wells defeated Whig nominee Nathaniel G. Wilcox and Free Soil nominee Abraham Smith.

== General election ==
On election day, August 3, 1846, Democratic nominee Joseph Wells won the election by a margin of 21,302 votes against his foremost opponent Whig nominee Nathaniel G. Wilcox, thereby retaining Democratic control over the office of lieutenant governor. Wells was sworn in as the 10th lieutenant governor of Illinois on December 9, 1846.

=== Results ===
Illinois lieutenant gubernatorial election, 1846
Party	Candidate	Votes	%
Democratic	Joseph Wells	57,457	58.13
Whig	Nathaniel G. Wilcox	36,155	36.58
Free Soil	Abraham Smith	5,179	5.24
Write-in		53	0.05
Total votes		98,844	100.00
Democratic hold			

== See also ==
- 1846 Illinois gubernatorial election
