= 1852 Illinois lieutenant gubernatorial election =

- November 2, 1852
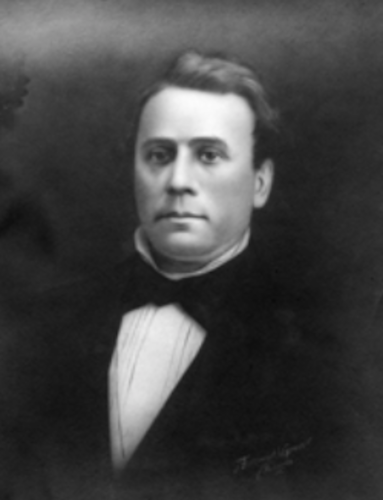

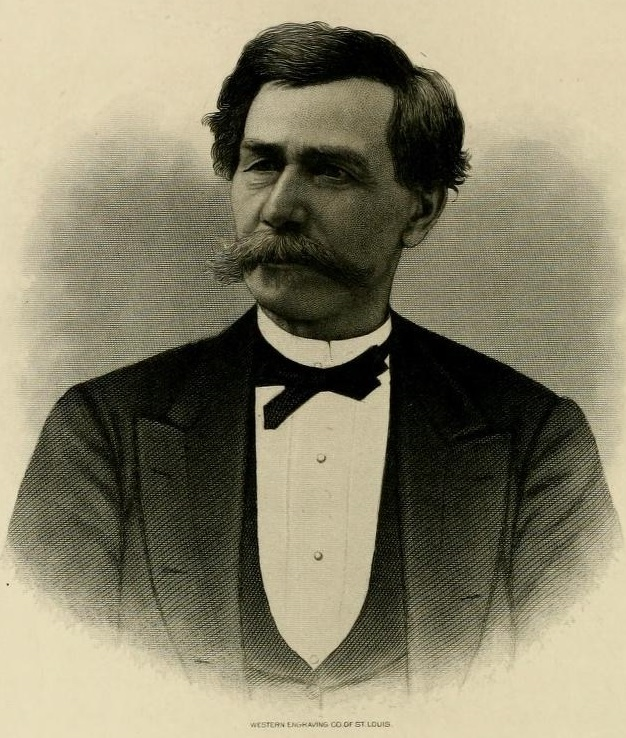

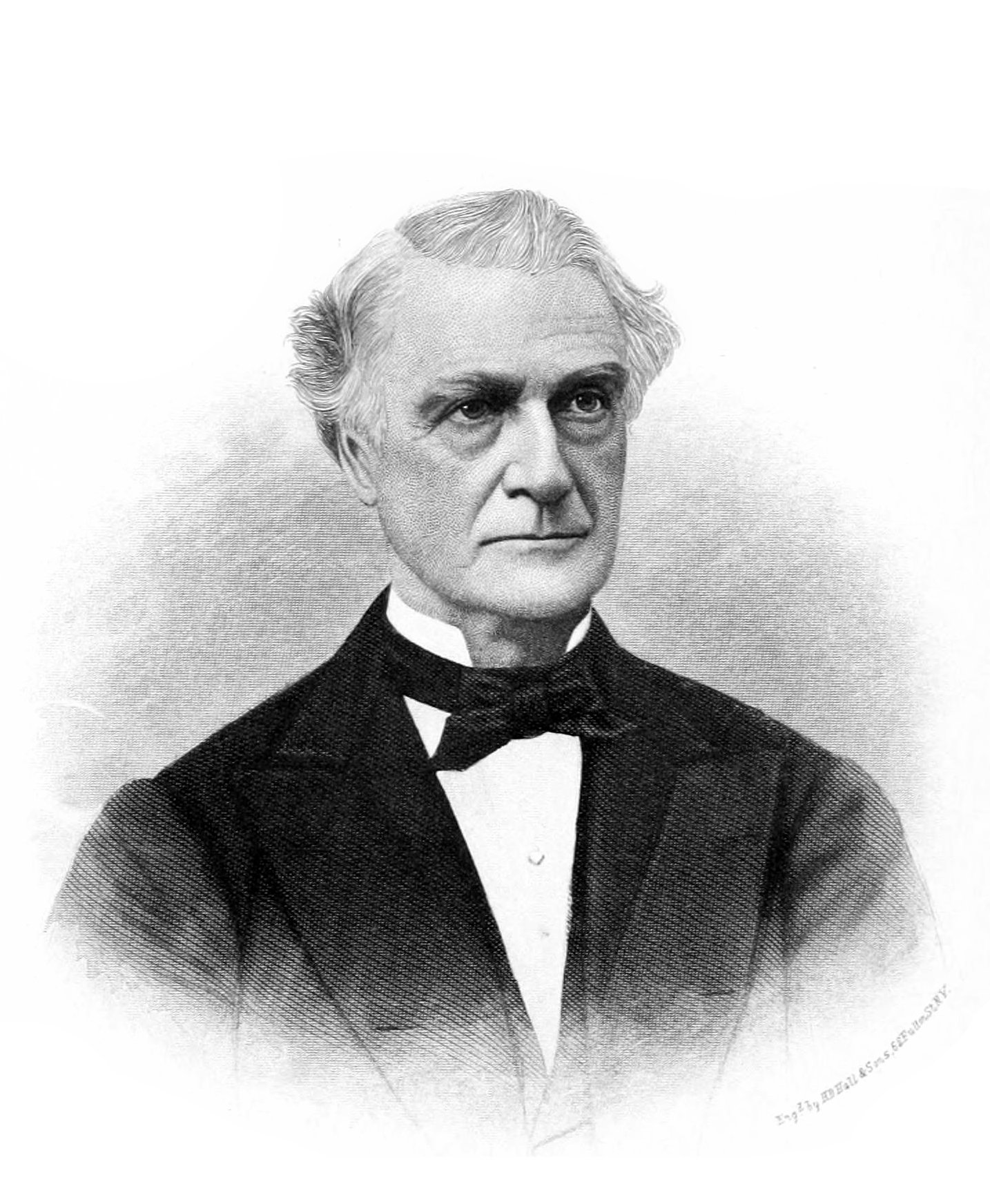
Nominee	Gustav Koerner	James L. D. Morrison	Philo Carpenter
Party	Democratic	Whig	Free Soil
Popular vote	79,970	64,876	8,909
Percentage	52.01%	42.19%	5.80%
Lieutenant Governor before election
William McMurtry
Democratic
Elected Lieutenant Governor
Gustav Koerner
Democratic

The 1852 Illinois lieutenant gubernatorial election was held on November 2, 1852, in order to elect the lieutenant governor of Illinois. Democratic nominee and former member of the Illinois House of Representatives Gustav Koerner defeated Whig nominee and former member of the Illinois Senate James L. D. Morrison and Free Soil nominee Philo Carpenter.

== General election ==
On election day, November 2, 1852, Democratic nominee Gustav Koerner won the election by a margin of 15,094 votes against his foremost opponent Whig nominee James L. D. Morrison, thereby retaining Democratic control over the office of lieutenant governor. Koerner was sworn in as the 12th lieutenant governor of Illinois on January 10, 1853.

=== Results ===
Illinois lieutenant gubernatorial election, 1852
Party	Candidate	Votes	%
Democratic	Gustav Koerner	79,970	52.01
Whig	James L. D. Morrison	64,876	42.19
Free Soil	Philo Carpenter	8,909	5.80
Total votes		153,755	100.00
Democratic hold			

== See also ==
- 1852 Illinois gubernatorial election
