= 1846 Illinois gubernatorial election =

- August 3, 1846
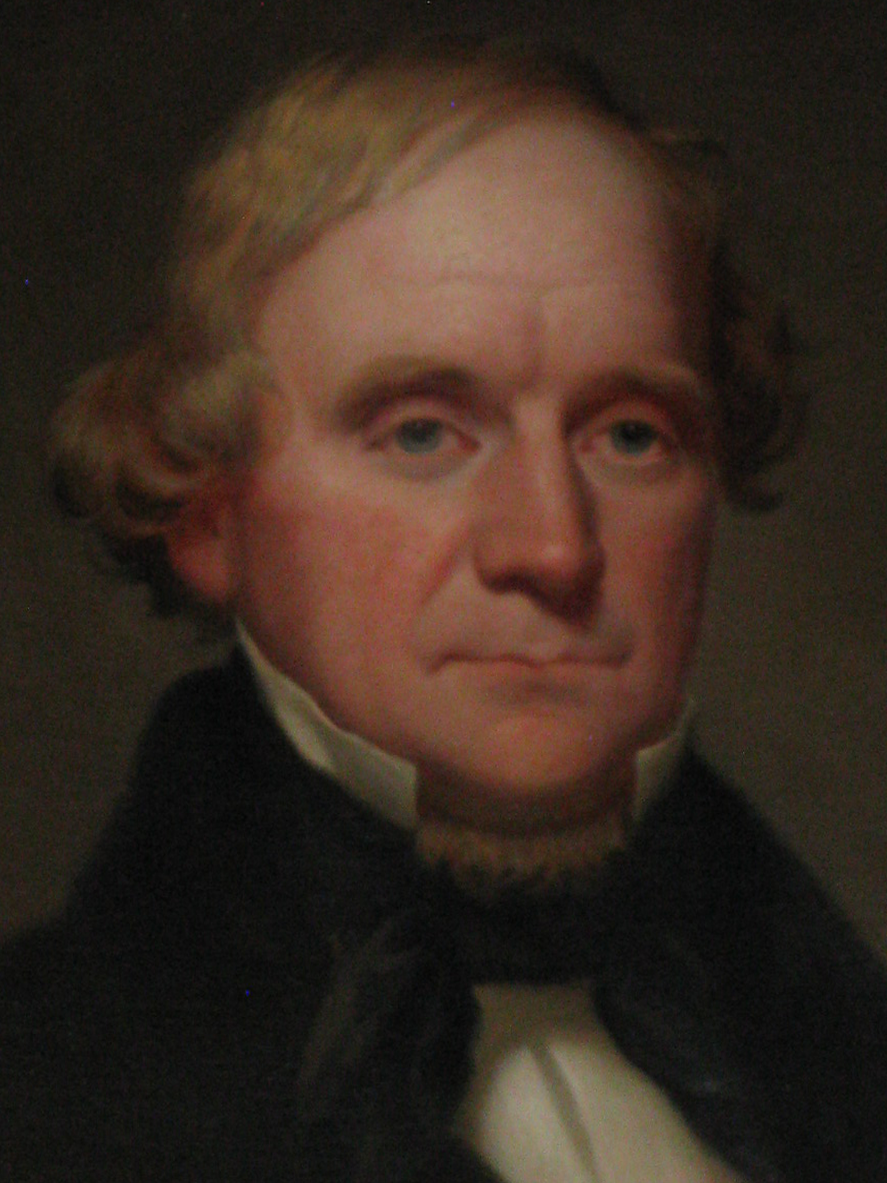

Nominee	Augustus C. French	Thomas M. Kilpatrick	Richard Eells
Party	Democratic	Whig	Liberty
Popular vote	58,657	37,033	5,154
Percentage	58.20%	36.69%	5.11%
- County Results French: 40–50% 50–60% 60–70% 70–80% 80–90% 90–100% Kilpatrick: 40–50% 50–60% 60–70% Unknown/No Vote
Governor before election
Thomas Ford
Democratic
Elected Governor
Augustus C. French
Democratic

The 1846 Illinois gubernatorial election was held on August 3, 1846. Democrat Augustus C. French defeated Whig nominee Thomas M. Kilpatrick, for the office. Richard Eels of the Liberty Party came in a distant third. The term was cut short, and lasted only half the normal length. This synchronized the gubernatorial election with the election for president. This would be the last Gubernatorial election held during midterms until 1978.

== General election ==
=== Candidates ===
- Richard Eells, Quincy physician and abolitionist (Liberty)
- Augustus C. French, former state representative from Palestine (Democratic)
- Thomas M. Kilpatrick (Whig)

=== Results ===
1846 Illinois gubernatorial election
Party	Candidate	Votes	%	±%
Democratic	Augustus C. French	58,657	58.20%	+4.68%
Whig	Thomas M. Kilpatrick	37,033	36.69%	−8.74%
Liberty	Richard Eells	5,154	5.11%	+4.07%
Majority		21,624	21.51%	N/A
Turnout		100,844	100.00%	
Democratic hold		Swing		

== See also ==
- 1846 Illinois lieutenant gubernatorial election
