= List of elections in 1842 =

The following elections occurred in the year 1842.

- 1842 French legislative election
- 1842 Newfoundland general election
- 1842 Portuguese legislative election

== North America ==
=== Canada ===
- 1842 Newfoundland general election

=== Central America ===
- 1842 Salvadoran presidential election

=== United States ===
- 1842 New York state election
- 1842 United States elections

==== United States Senate ====
- 1842 and 1843 United States Senate elections

==== United States House of Representatives ====
- 1842 United States House of Representatives elections

==== United States lieutenant gubernatorial ====
- 1842 Connecticut lieutenant gubernatorial election
- 1842 Illinois lieutenant gubernatorial election

==== United States gubernatorial ====
- 1842 Connecticut gubernatorial election
- 1842 Illinois gubernatorial election
- 1842 Louisiana gubernatorial election
- 1842 Maine gubernatorial election
- 1842 Massachusetts gubernatorial election
- 1842 New Hampshire gubernatorial election
- 1842 New Jersey gubernatorial election
- 1842 New York gubernatorial election
- 1842 North Carolina gubernatorial election
- 1842 Ohio gubernatorial election
- 1842 Rhode Island gubernatorial election
- 1842 Vermont gubernatorial election
- 1842 Virginia gubernatorial election

==== United States mayoral elections ====
- 1842 Boston mayoral election
- 1842 Chicago mayoral election
- 1842 Philadelphia mayoral election

== See also ==
- Category:1842 elections
