= Charles V. Dyer =

American physician

Charles Volney Dyer
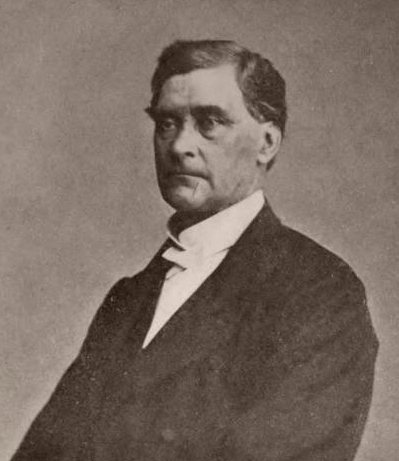
- Born: June 12, 1808; Clarendon, Vermont, U.S.
- Died: April 24, 1878 (aged 69); Lake View, Illinois, U.S.
- Burial place: Oak Woods Cemetery
- Education: Middlebury College
- Spouse: Louisa M. Gifford
- Children: 6

Charles Volney Dyer (June 12, 1808 – April 24, 1878) was a prominent Chicago abolitionist and Stationmaster on the Underground Railroad.

== Early life ==
Charles was born in Clarendon, Vermont on June 12, 1808, the ninth of the ten children of Daniel and Susannah Olin Dyer. A precocious child, he was sent at age 15 to the Castleton Academy to prepare for college. He then attended Middlebury College's medical department, from which he graduated on December 9, 1830.

He established a practice in Newark, Wayne County Vermont in February 1831.

== Chicago years ==
Ambition led him to Chicago, then a small, but rapidly growing town, in August 1835. He became Surgeon for the garrison at Ft. Dearborn soon thereafter. In 1837, he married Louisa M. Gifford, of Elgin, with whom he would have six children, three of whom (Stella Louisa, Charles Gifford and Louis) would survive into adulthood. The Dyers also adopted a daughter, Cornelia. Dyer was elected town clerk of Chicago in the Juny 6, 1836 town election (held at the Tremont House), but resigned immediately after being elected.

Reentering private practice, he was instrumental in the fight against the cholera that plagued Chicago in the late 1840s. In 1839, he shared offices with Dr. Levi D. Boone, who would go on to become mayor of Chicago in 1855.

Dyer invested his savings in real estate, and after several ups and downs, was able to retire from the practice of medicine in 1854.

== Abolition activities ==
In 1837, Dr. Dyer rented a hall and called a protest meeting in reaction to the murder of Elijah Lovejoy by a mob in Alton, Illinois. In 1838, he helped organize a Chicago Chapter of the American Anti-Slavery Society, along with Rev. Flavel Bascom, Philo Carpenter, Robert Freeman, L.C.P. Freer, and Calvin DeWolf.

In 1839, Dyer took in a runaway slave boy, and arranged for his passage on to Windsor, Canada, thus beginning his career as a stationmaster on the Underground Railroad. From then on, he would host many runaways, evading the Illinois law against "harboring" (fraudulently concealing) runaways by allowing them to live openly in his home while waiting for passage to Canada. One prominent conductor on the Underground Railroad, Owen Lovejoy, is known to have taken many runaway slaves to Dr. Dyer's home, and was frequently a guest there himself.

Dyer was not merely a passive host, he was also known to take action to rescue runaways who were retrieved by slave-catchers. Slave-catchers from Kentucky, knowing that Dr. Dyer was harboring a young male slave they were after, waited for the boy to leave Dr. Dyer's house on an errand. Snatching him, they took him to a hotel and bound him with rope, sending for a blacksmith to fit him with iron manacles. Hearing about this, Dyer went to the hotel, burst into the room where the captive was held, and cut the ropes, directing him to escape through a window.

Once the slave catchers recovered from their surprise at this bold action, they chased Dr. Dyer out into the street, and one of them charged him with a Bowie knife. Dyer beat the man unconscious with his walking stick, breaking it in the process. The rest of the gang gathered their companion and left. A gold-capped cane presented to Dr. Dyer by the African American citizens of Chicago in memory of this incident still rests in the collection of the Chicago History Museum.

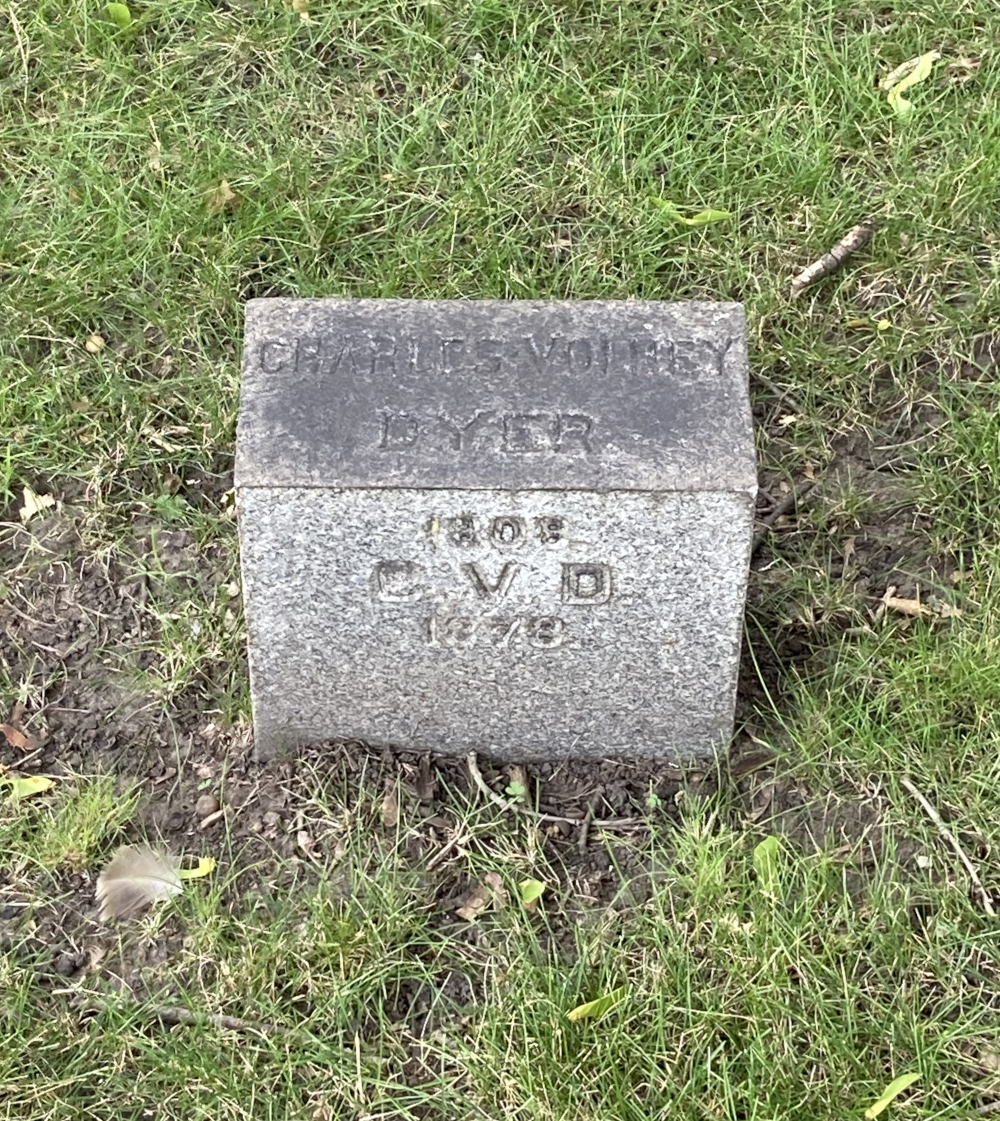
Dyer's grave at Oak Woods Cemetery

In 1848, Dyer ran for Governor of Illinois on the Liberty ticket. He lost to Augustus C. French.

== Career as judge ==
In 1862, Great Britain and the US entered into the Lyons-Seward Treaty, intended to suppress the international slave trade. In 1863, Abraham Lincoln appointed Dr. Dyer a judge of the Mixed Court for the Suppression of the Slave Trade in Sierra Leone.

Charles V. Dyer died at his daughter's home in Lake View, Illinois on April 24, 1878. He was buried at Oak Woods Cemetery in Chicago.

Party political offices
First	Free Soil nominee for Governor of Illinois; 1848	Succeeded by D. A. Knowlton
