= 1838 Illinois gubernatorial election =

- August 6, 1838
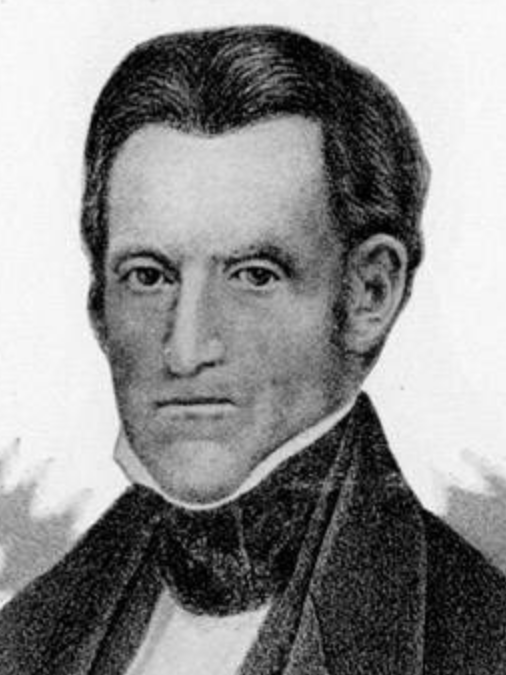

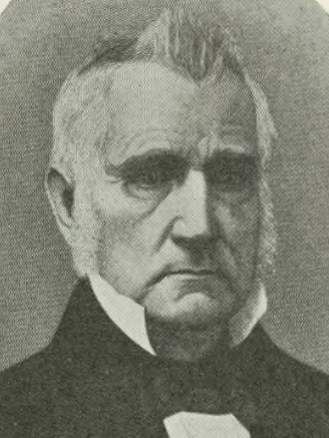
Nominee	Thomas Carlin (replacing James W. Stephenson)	Cyrus Edwards
Party	Democratic	Whig
Popular vote	30,668	29,722
Percentage	50.78%	49.22%
- County Results Carlin: 50–60% 60–70% 70–80% 80–90% 90–100% Edwards: 50–60% 60–70% 70–80% 80–90% Unknown/No Vote
Governor before election
Joseph Duncan
Whig
Elected Governor
Thomas Carlin
Democratic

The 1838 Illinois gubernatorial election was the sixth quadrennial election for this office. Democratic nominee Thomas Carlin was elected by a bare majority of the voters in a close election. He defeated Whig nominee Cyrus Edwards, the brother of former governor Ninian Edwards, for the office.

Originally, the Democratic Party had nominated James W. Stephenson to be their candidate. However, Stephenson was forced to withdrawal from the election after he was caught in an embezzling scandal related to his time as the state's Register of Lands. A second Democratic convention was convened in June 1838 and Carlin, who had a reputation for honesty, was selected as the replacement nominee.

== General election ==
=== Candidates ===
- Thomas Carlin, former state senator from Carrollton (Democratic)
- Cyrus Edwards, state senator from Edwardsville and brother of former governor Ninian Edwards (Whig)

==== Withdrew ====
- James W. Stephenson, state senator from Galena and registrar of lands (Democratic)

=== Results ===
1838 gubernatorial election, Illinois
Party	Candidate	Votes	%	±%
Democratic	Thomas Carlin	30,668	50.78%	+19.57%
Whig	Cyrus Edwards	29,722	49.22%	−3.71%
Majority		946	1.56%	N/A
Turnout		60,390		
Democratic gain from Whig		Swing		

== See also ==
- 1838 Illinois lieutenant gubernatorial election
