= 1852 Illinois gubernatorial election =

- November 7, 1852
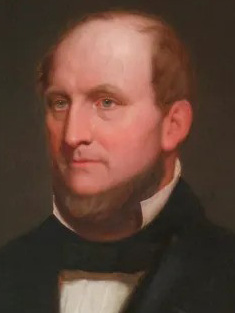

Nominee	Joel Aldrich Matteson	Edwin B. Webb	D. A. Knowlton
Party	Democratic	Whig	Free Soil
Popular vote	80,789	64,408	9,024
Percentage	52.39%	41.76%	5.85%
- County results Matteson: 40–50% 50–60% 60–70% 70–80% 80–90% Webb: 30–40% 40–50% 50–60% 70–80%
Governor before election
Augustus C. French
Democratic
Elected Governor
Joel Aldrich Matteson
Democratic

The 1852 Illinois gubernatorial election was held on November 7, 1852. Democratic governor Augustus C. French did not seek re-election. Democrat Joel Aldrich Matteson was elected to succeed him.

== General election ==
=== Candidates ===
- D. A. Knowlton (Free Soil)
- Joel Aldrich Matteson, businessman and state senator from Joliet (Democratic)
- Edwin B. Webb (Whig)

=== Results ===
1852 gubernatorial election, Illinois
Party	Candidate	Votes	%	±%
Democratic	Joel Aldrich Matteson	80,789	52.39%	−34.37%
Whig	Edwin B. Webb	64,408	41.76%	+34.52%
Free Soil	D. A. Knowlton	9,024	5.85%	−0.15%
Majority		16,381	10.62%	−68.90%
Turnout		154,221	100.00%	
Democratic hold		Swing		

== See also ==
- 1852 Illinois lieutenant gubernatorial election
