= Governor Carlin =

Governor Carlin may refer to:

- John W. Carlin (born 1940), 40th Governor of Kansas
- Thomas Carlin (1789–1852), 7th Governor of Illinois
