= 1842 Illinois lieutenant gubernatorial election =

- August 1, 1842

| Nominee | John Moore | William H. Henderson |
| Party | Democratic | Whig |
| Popular vote | 45,567 | 38,426 |
| Percentage | 53.67% | 45.26% |
Lieutenant Governor before election
Stinson Anderson
Democratic
Elected Lieutenant Governor
John Moore
Democratic

The 1842 Illinois lieutenant gubernatorial election was held on August 1, 1842, in order to elect the lieutenant governor of Illinois. Democratic nominee and former member of the Illinois Senate John Moore defeated Whig nominee William H. Henderson and Liberty nominee Fredrick H. Collins.

== General election ==
On election day, August 1, 1842, Democratic nominee John Moore won the election by a margin of 7,141 votes against his foremost opponent Whig nominee William H. Henderson, thereby retaining Democratic control over the office of lieutenant governor. Moore was sworn in as the 9th lieutenant governor of Illinois on December 3, 1842.

=== Results ===
Illinois lieutenant gubernatorial election, 1842
| Party | Candidate | Votes | % |
|---|---|---|---|
| Democratic | John Moore | 45,567 | 53.67 |
| Whig | William H. Henderson | 38,426 | 45.26 |
| Liberty | Fredrick H. Collins | 900 | 1.06 |
| Write-in | | 6 | 0.01 |
| Total votes | | 84,899 | 100.00 |
| Democratic hold | | | |

== See also ==
- 1842 Illinois gubernatorial election
