= 1842 Illinois gubernatorial election =

- August 1, 1842
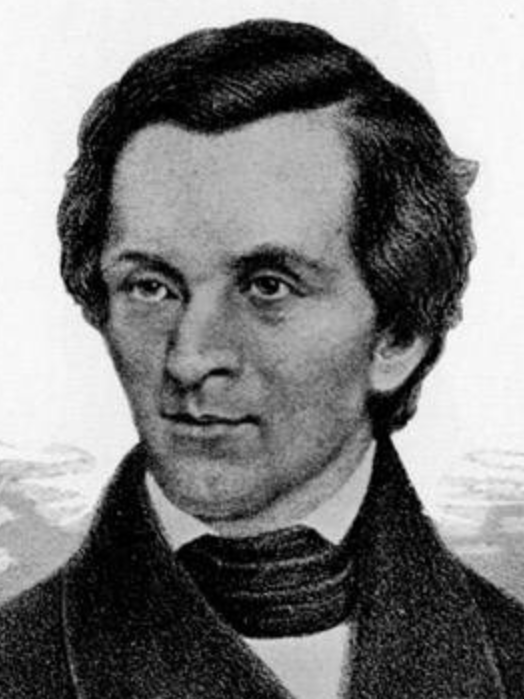

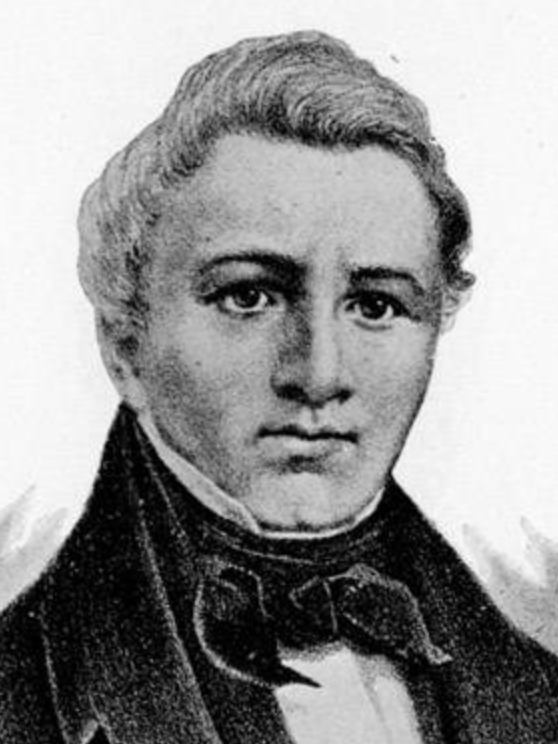
Nominee	Thomas Ford (replacing Adam W. Snyder †)	Joseph Duncan
Party	Democratic	Whig
Popular vote	46,452	39,429
Percentage	53.52%	45.43%
- County Results Ford: 40–50% 50–60% 60–70% 70–80% 80–90% Duncan: 40–50% 50–60% 60–70% 80–90% 90–100%
Governor before election
Thomas Carlin
Democratic
Elected Governor
Thomas Ford
Democratic

The 1842 Illinois gubernatorial election was held on August 1. Democrat Thomas Ford, who replaced the original Democratic nominee Adam W. Snyder following his death, defeated former Whig governor Joseph Duncan, who was running for a nonconsecutive second term.

== General election ==
=== Candidates ===
- Joseph Duncan, former governor of Illinois (Whig)
- Thomas Ford, associate justice of the Supreme Court of Illinois (Democratic) (replacing Adam W. Snyder)
- Charles M. Hunter (Independent)
- Adam W. Snyder, former U.S. representative from Belleville (Democratic) (died May 14)

=== Results ===
1842 gubernatorial election, Illinois
Party	Candidate	Votes	%	±%
Democratic	Thomas Ford	46,452	53.52%	+2.74%
Whig	Joseph Duncan	39,429	45.43%	−3.79%
Independent	Charles M. Hunter	906	1.04%	+1.04%
Independent	Scattering	3	0.00%	0.00%
Majority		7,023	8.09%	N/A
Turnout		86,793		
Democratic hold		Swing		

== See also ==
- 1842 Illinois lieutenant gubernatorial election
