= Robert Smith (Illinois politician) =

American politician (1802–1867)

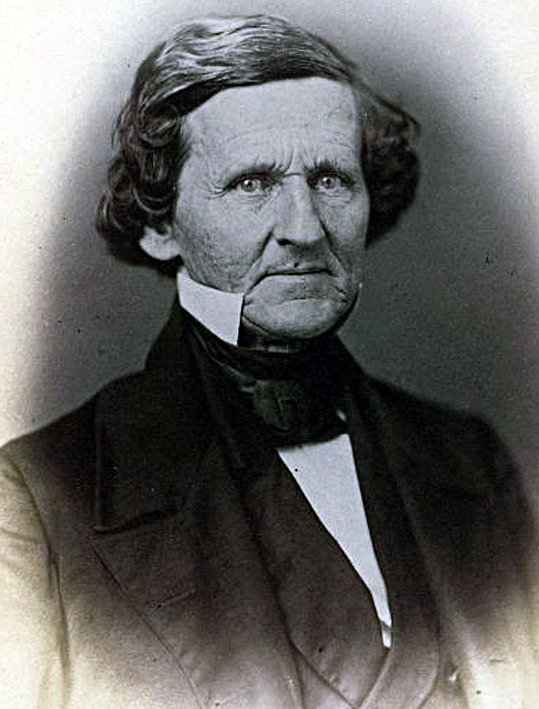

Member of the U.S. House of Representatives from Illinois
- In office March 4, 1857 – March 3, 1859
- Preceded by: James L. D. Morrison
- Succeeded by: Philip B. Fouke
- Constituency: 8th district
- In office March 4, 1843 – March 3, 1849
- Preceded by: John Reynolds
- Succeeded by: William Henry Bissell
- Constituency: 1st district

Member of the Illinois House of Representatives
- In office 1836–1840

Personal details
- Born: June 12, 1802 Peterborough, New Hampshire, U.S.
- Died: December 21, 1867 (aged 65) Alton, Illinois, U.S.
- Party: Democratic

Robert Smith (June 12, 1802 – December 21, 1867) was a U.S. representative from Illinois, nephew of Jeremiah Smith and Samuel Smith of New Hampshire. Smith founded the Minneapolis Milling Company in 1856, which eventually became General Mills.

Born in Peterborough, New Hampshire, Smith attended the public schools and New Ipswich Academy. He taught school. He engaged in mercantile pursuits in 1822 and in the manufacturing of textile goods in Northfield, New Hampshire in 1823. He studied law. He was admitted to the bar and practiced. He moved to Illinois and settled in Alton in 1832 and again engaged in mercantile pursuits.

Smith was elected captain in the state militia in 1832. He was an extensive land owner, and engaged in the real estate business. He served as a member of the Illinois House of Representatives from 1836 to 1840. He was elected enrolling and engrossing clerk of the Illinois House of Representatives in 1840 and 1842.

Smith was elected as a Democrat to the Twenty-eighth and Twenty-ninth Congresses and reelected as an Independent Democrat to the Thirtieth Congress (March 4, 1843 – March 3, 1849). He served as chairman of the Committee on Roads and Canals (Twenty-ninth Congress).

Smith was elected as a Democrat to the Thirty-fifth Congress (March 4, 1857 – March 3, 1859). He served as chairman of the Committee on Mileage (Thirty-fifth Congress). He served as paymaster during the Civil War. He died in Alton, and was interred in Alton City Cemetery.

Smith attended an event in Greenville, Illinois in 1858 in which Abraham Lincoln and Stephen Douglas gave speeches around the time of the Lincoln-Douglas debates.

U.S. House of Representatives
Preceded by John Reynolds	Member of the U.S. House of Representatives from Illinois's 1st congressional district 1843-1849	Succeeded by William H. Bissell
Preceded by James L. D. Morrison	Member of the U.S. House of Representatives from Illinois's 8th congressional district 1857-1859	Succeeded by Philip B. Fouke
