= John T. Stuart =

American politician (1807–1885)

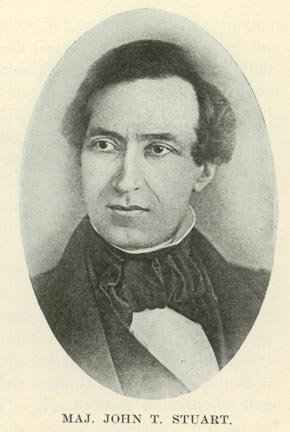
- John T. Stuart as a major during the Black Hawk War

Member of the U.S. House of Representatives from Illinois's 8th district
- In office March 4, 1863 – March 3, 1865
- Preceded by: Philip B. Fouke
- Succeeded by: Shelby Moore Cullom

Member of the U.S. House of Representatives from Illinois's 3rd district
- In office March 4, 1839 – March 3, 1843
- Preceded by: William L. May
- Succeeded by: Orlando B. Ficklin

Personal details
- Born: November 10, 1807 Lexington, Kentucky
- Died: November 28, 1885 (aged 78) Springfield, Illinois
- Party: Democratic
- Other political affiliations: Whig; Constitutional Union

John Todd Stuart (November 10, 1807 – November 28, 1885) was a lawyer and a U.S. Representative from Illinois.

Born near Lexington, Kentucky, Stuart graduated from Centre College, Danville, Kentucky, in 1826. He then studied law, was admitted to the bar in 1828, and commenced practice in Springfield, Illinois. He was a major in the Black Hawk War in 1832, where he first met Abraham Lincoln, who was in the same battalion as Stuart.

He served as member of the Illinois House of Representatives between 1832 and 1836. Stuart encouraged Lincoln to study law and the two subsequently became law partners, between 1837 and 1841. If not for Stuart's influence, it is conceivable that Lincoln might never have been interested in the law - and thus, might not ever have become president.

Stuart was an unsuccessful candidate for election in 1836 to the Twenty-fifth Congress. He was, however, elected as a Whig to the Twenty-sixth and Twenty-seventh Congresses (March 4, 1839 - March 3, 1843), winning over Stephen A. Douglas in 1838. He was not a candidate for renomination in 1842.

Stuart established a law partnership with Benjamin S. Edwards in 1843, a partnership that would last for forty years. Stuart served as member of the Illinois Senate between 1848 and 1852. He was the unsuccessful Constitutional Union candidate for Governor of Illinois in 1860.

Stuart was elected as a Democrat to the Thirty-eighth Congress (March 4, 1863 - March 3, 1865), and served there while Lincoln was president. His vote on the Thirteenth Amendment is recorded as Nay.

Stuart was a favorite cousin of Mary Todd Lincoln and as a member of Congress after his election in 1862 over Republican Leonard Swett was a frequent visitor at the White House even though he was an anti-emancipation Democrat.

He was defeated in 1864 by Republican Shelby Moore Cullom, a Lincoln ally.

Following his defeat in 1864, Stuart resumed the practice of law in Springfield. He died there and was interred in the Oak Ridge Cemetery.

In the fall of 2007, Centre College (Stuart's alma mater) dedicated Stuart Hall, a building that once housed the College's bookstore but is now a residence hall, in honor of the influence Stuart had over Lincoln's career path as well as Stuart's contribution to law.

The firm that he founded in Springfield Illinois, once known as "Stuart and Lincoln," is still operating under the name "Brown, Hay, & Stephens," and includes his great-great-grandson as a partner.

U.S. House of Representatives
Preceded by William L. May	Member of the U.S. House of Representatives from Illinois's 3rd congressional district 1839-1843	Succeeded by Orlando B. Ficklin
Preceded by Philip B. Fouke	Member of the U.S. House of Representatives from Illinois's 8th congressional district 1863-1865	Succeeded by Shelby M. Cullom
