= William L. May =

American politician from Illinois (c.1793–1849)

Member of the U.S. House of Representatives from Illinois's 3rd district
- In office December 1, 1834 – March 3, 1839
- Preceded by: Joseph Duncan
- Succeeded by: John T. Stuart

Member of the Illinois House of Representatives from Morgan County
- In office 1828–1830

Personal details
- Born: 1793 Kentucky
- Died: September 29, 1849 (aged 55–56) Sacramento, California
- Party: Democratic

William L. May (c. 1793 – September 29, 1849) was a U.S. representative from Illinois.

Born in Kentucky, May attended the common schools. He moved to Edwardsville, Illinois, and afterward to Jacksonville. He was appointed Justice of the Peace in Madison County on December 10, 1817, and served as captain of militia in 1822.

May was elected Justice of the Peace in Morgan County on August 6, 1827, and resigned August 29, 1829. From 1828 to 1830, he served as member of the Illinois House of Representatives representing Morgan County in the 6th Illinois General Assembly. May then moved to Springfield, having been appointed by President Andrew Jackson as receiver of public monies for the United States Land Office in that city. He studied law, was admitted to the bar and practiced. Other previous jobs have involved operating a ferry across the Illinois River at Peoria and organizing the Peoria Bridge Co.

May was elected as a Jacksonian to the Twenty-third Congress to fill the vacancy caused by the resignation of Joseph Duncan. He was reelected as a Jacksonian to the Twenty-fourth Congress and elected as a Democrat to the Twenty-fifth Congress and served from December 1, 1834, to March 3, 1839.

May served as chairman of the Committee on Private Land Claims (Twenty-fifth Congress). He was not a candidate for renomination in 1838 to the Twenty-sixth Congress. May continued the practice of law after he moved to Peoria. After having been elected as mayor of Springfield in May 1841, he went to California during the gold rush.

He died in Sacramento, California on September 29, 1849.

U.S. House of Representatives
Preceded by Joseph Duncan	Member of the U.S. House of Representatives from Illinois's 3rd congressional district 1834-1839	Succeeded by John T. Stuart
