= C. T. Blackfan =

American politician

Member of the Washington House of Representatives
- In office 1889–1891

Personal details
- Born: March 1848 Illinois, United States
- Died: February 28, 1907 (aged 58) California, United States
- Party: Republican

Charles T. Blackfan (March 1848 – February 28, 1907) was an American politician in the state of Washington. Blackfan served in the 102 Regiment of the Illinois infantry in 1864 and 1865. He served in the Washington House of Representatives from 1889 to 1891.
