= 102nd Illinois Infantry Regiment =

102nd Regiment Illinois Volunteer Infantry
- Active: September 1, 1862 - June 14, 1865
- Country: United States
- Allegiance: Union
- Branch: Infantry
- Engagements: Atlanta campaign Battle of Resaca; Battle of Kennesaw Mountain; Battle of Peachtree Creek; Siege of Atlanta; Battle of Jonesboro; Sherman's March to the Sea; Carolinas campaign Battle of Bentonville

The 102nd Illinois Volunteer Infantry was an infantry regiment in the Union Army during the American Civil War.

== Service ==
The 102nd Illinois Infantry was organized at Knoxville, Illinois, and mustered in for three years service on September 1, 1862.

The regiment was attached to Ward's Brigade, Dumont's 12th Division, Army of the Ohio, to November 1862. Ward's Brigade, Post of Gallatin, Tennessee, Department of the Cumberland, to June 1863. 2nd Brigade, 3rd Division, Reserve Corps, Army of the Cumberland, to August 1863. Ward's Brigade, Post of Nashville, Tennessee, Department of the Cumberland, to January 1864. 1st Brigade, 1st Division, XI Corps, Army of the Cumberland, to April, 1864. 1st Brigade, 3rd Division, XX Corps, Army of the Cumberland, and Army of Georgia, to June, 1865.

The 102nd Illinois Infantry mustered out of service on June 6, 1865, and discharged at Chicago, Illinois, on June 14, 1865.

== Detailed service ==
Moved to Peoria, Illinois, September 22, then to Louisville, Kentucky, October 1. March in pursuit of Bragg through Kentucky October 1–16, 1862. March to Gallatin, Tennessee, via Frankfort, Bowling Green, and Scottsville, Kentucky, October 16-November 26. Duty at Gallatin until June 6, 1868. Action at Woodbury April 27, 1863. Moved to Lavergne, Tennessee, and on railroad guard duty at Lavergne and Stewart's Creek until February 1864. (5 companies mounted August 1863.) Moved to Wauhatchie Valley, Tennessee, February 25, 1864. Scout from Lookout Valley to Deer Head Cove, Georgia, March 29–31. Atlanta Campaign May 1-September 8. Movement on Dalton May 5–8. Demonstration on Rocky Faced Ridge May 8–11. Battle of Resaca May 14–15. Near Cassville May 19. Advance on Dallas May 22–25. New Hope Church May 25. Operations on line of Pumpkin Vine Creek and battles about Dallas, New Hope Church, and Allatoona Hills May 26-June 5. Big Shanty June 1. Operations about Marietta and against Kennesaw Mountain June 10-July 2. Pine Hill June 11–14. Lost Mountain June 15–17. Gilgal or Golgotha Church June 15. Muddy Creek June 17. Noyes Creek June 19. Kolb's Farm June 22. Assault on Kennesaw June 27. Ruff's Station, Smyrna Camp Ground, July 4. Chattahoochee River July 5–17. Peachtree Creek July 19–20. Siege of Atlanta July 22-August 25. Operations at Chattahoochie River Bridge August 26-September 2. Occupation of Atlanta September 2-November 15. March to the sea November 15-December 10. Occupation of Milledgeville November 22. Ogeechee River November 29. Siege of Savannah December 10–21. Carolinas Campaign January to April 1865. Occupation of Hardeeville January 3, 1865. Occupation of Lawtonville, South Carolina, February 2. Rockingham, North Carolina, March 7. Fayetteville, North Carolina, March 11. Averysboro, Taylor's Hole Creek, March 16. Battle of Bentonville March 19–21. Moccasin Creek March 24. Occupation of Goldsboro March 24. Advance on Raleigh April 10–14. Occupation of Raleigh April 14. Bennett's House April 26. Surrender of Johnston and his army. March to Washington, D.C., via Richmond, Virginia, April 30-May 19. Grand Review of the Armies May 24.

== Casualties ==
The regiment lost a total of 119 men during service; 51 enlisted men killed or mortally wounded, 68 enlisted men died of disease.

== Commanders ==
- Colonel William McMurtry
- Colonel Franklin C. Smith

== Notable members ==
- Private Charles T. Blackfan, Company C - member of the Washington House of Representatives (1889-1891)
- Captain Edwin H. Conger, Company I - U.S. Representative from Iowa (1885–1890) and diplomat
- Corporal Eli S. Ricker, Company I - journalist, county judge (in Nebraska), and oral historian of Native Americans

== See also ==
- List of Illinois Civil War units
- Illinois in the Civil War
