= Eli S. Ricker =

American journalist (1843–1926)

Eli Seavey Ricker
- Born: March 29, 1843; Maine, U.S.
- Died: May 17, 1926 (aged 83); Grand Junction, Colorado, U.S.
- Military career
- Allegiance: United States
- Branch: Union Army
- Rank: Corporal

Eli Seavey Ricker (April 29, 1843 - May 17, 1926) was a corporal serving the Union Army during the American Civil War, newspaper editor, rancher, judge, and activist known for his support of Native Americans and other social causes. He was one of the first historians to recognize the validity of the Native American views.

== Biography ==
Ricker was born in Maine in 1843. He later moved to Knoxville, Illinois, and was 17 years old when the American Civil War began. Ricker had been working as a journalist for a number of years already, reporting for the Knox County Observer and Galesburg Free Press. He enlisted in 1862, and served as a corporal in the 102nd Illinois Volunteer Infantry Regiment during the war, which took part in Sherman's March to the Sea. He also wrote for newspapers back home giving an account of the war.

After the war, Ricker became a newspaper owner and editor in Nebraska as well as a county judge. He is most well known for his progressive views on Native Americans and the more than fifty interviews he did with various Native Americans, as well as scouts and settlers, recording various eyewitness accounts on events during the Indian Wars in the west, such as the Battle of the Little Bighorn and the Wounded Knee Massacre. He recorded this information for a book he planned on writing to be entitled "The Final Conflict between the Red Men and the Palefaces." Ricker recorded more than 1,500 pages on ruled tablets which came to be known as the "Ricker Tablets". He never got around to writing his book but the information he gathered, many first hand accounts of historical events, is considered an invaluable historical resource for documenting the history of the American West. These tablets are now in the archives of the Nebraska State Historical Society.

His wife, Mary, burned to death in the couples' home in February 1925. Ricker died on May 17, 1926, at his home on Ouray Avenue in Colorado.
