= Charles Gifford Dyer =

American painter

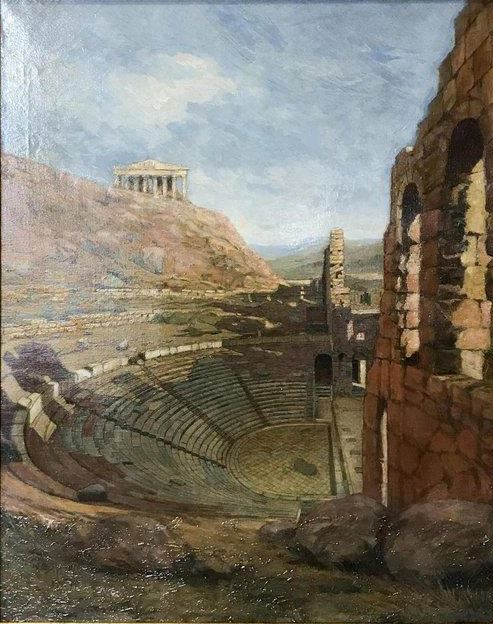
The Odeon of Herodes Atticus and the Parthenon

Charles Gifford Dyer (1846/51, in Chicago, Illinois – 26 January 1912, in Munich, Germany) was an American painter, known mostly for his architectural scenes of Venice and Greece.

== Biography ==
He was born to Dr. Charles Volney Dyer, who was originally from Vermont, worked for the Chicago section of the "Underground Railroad" and was a close friend of Abraham Lincoln.

After his primary education, he attended and graduated from the Naval Academy Preparatory School in Newport, Rhode Island. He served briefly in the Civil War, but had to resign for health reasons. He then went to Paris to study art with Louis Jacquesson de la Chevreuse and, in 1871, transferred to the Academy of Fine Arts, Munich, where he studied with his fellow American, David Dalhoff Neal. He would spend most of his career in Germany, except for extended visits to Rome, Venice, and the Middle East. He continued to exhibit in the United States, notably at the National Academy of Design (1875) and the Boston Art Club (1883).

He and his wife, Mary Anthony Dyer, were part of an expatriate community of American artists which included their friend, John Singer Sargent, who painted a portrait of her during one of their visits to Venice; now in the collection of the Art Institute of Chicago. Their daughter, Stella, was a piano prodigy but at the age of seven she moved to the violin and performed throughout Europe as a young woman.

He was an art professor in Munich at the time of his death. His cremated remains were returned to America and interred in the Dyer family plot at the Oakwoods Cemetery in Chicago, Illinois. A series of thirty paintings of the ruins of Greece, commissioned by J. Pierpont Morgan, were left uncompleted.
