= Joseph Duncan (politician) =

Governor of Illinois from 1834 to 1838

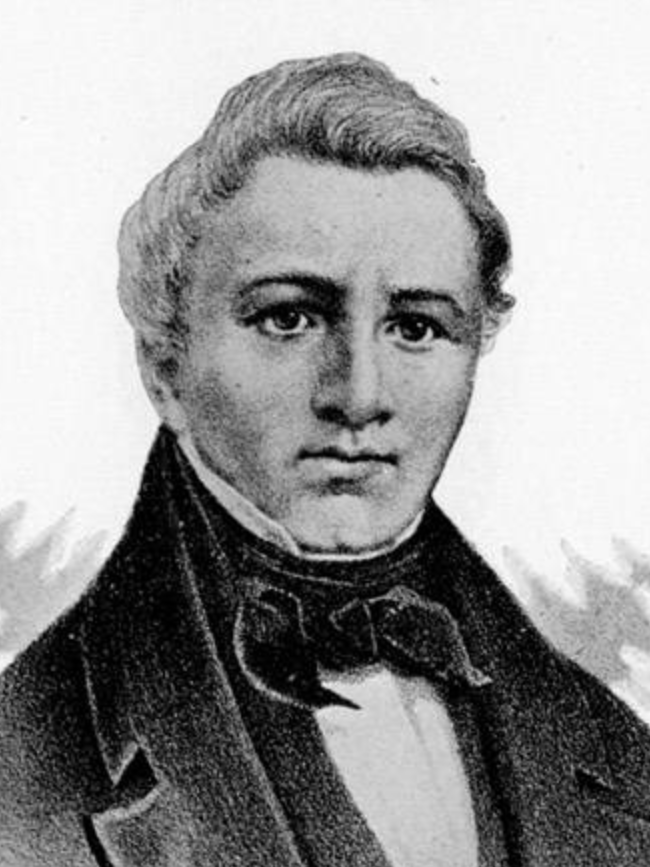

6th Governor of Illinois
- In office December 3, 1834 – December 7, 1838
- Lieutenant: Alexander M. Jenkins; William H. Davidson
- Preceded by: William Lee D. Ewing
- Succeeded by: Thomas Carlin

Member of the U.S. House of Representatives from Illinois
- In office March 4, 1827 – September 21, 1834
- Preceded by: Daniel P. Cook (AL); District established (3rd)
- Succeeded by: District eliminated (AL); William L. May (3rd)
- Constituency: At-large district (1827-33); 3rd district (1833-34)

Member of the Illinois House of Representatives
- In office 1825-1829

Member of the Illinois Senate

Personal details
- Born: February 22, 1794 Paris, Kentucky, US
- Died: January 15, 1844 (aged 49) Jacksonville, Illinois, US
- Party: Democratic, Whig
- Profession: Politician

Joseph Duncan (February 22, 1794 – January 15, 1844) was an Illinois politician. He served as the sixth governor of Illinois from 1834 to 1838, the only Whig to ever govern the state. Before becoming governor he served four terms in the United States House of Representatives as a Democrat.

He was the last governor of Illinois that was neither a Democrat or Republican while in office.

== Early and family life ==
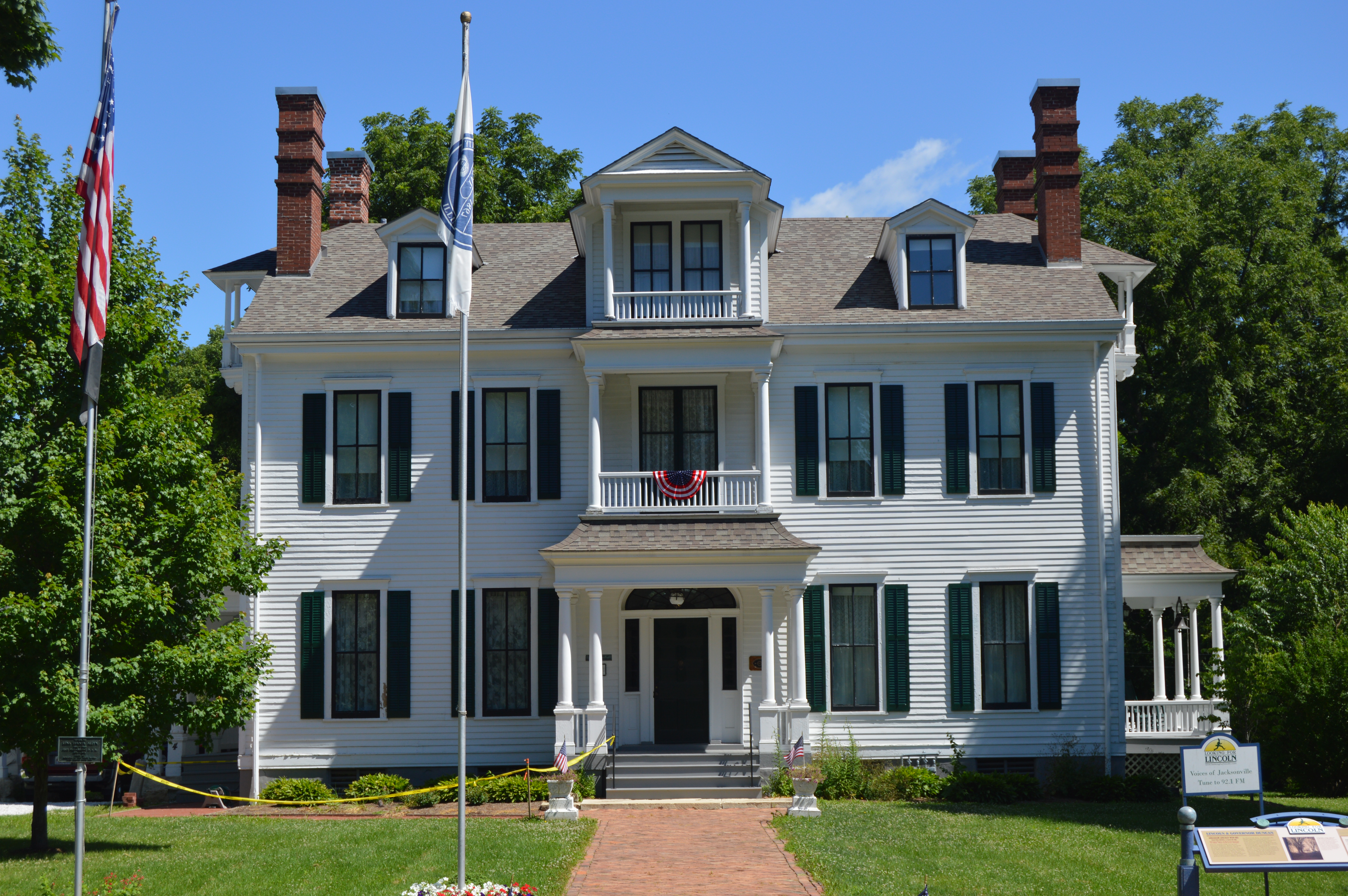
Duncan's house in Jacksonville

Duncan was born in Paris, Kentucky. He served in the War of 1812 and the Black Hawk War as a soldier.

== Career ==
Duncan moved to Illinois in the year of its statehood, 1818, settling in Brownsville in Jackson County. Here, he was a member of the Masonic fraternity at Hiram Lodge No. 8. Duncan moved to Jacksonville in 1830.

Before becoming governor, he had a notable political career. Duncan first won election as a delegate in the Illinois House of Representatives, serving from 1825 to 1829. Voters then elected him to represent Illinois's at-large congressional district in Congress in 1826, as he defeated abolitionist and multi-term Congressman Daniel Pope Cook. Jacksonian Democrats were ascendant in Illinois politics, and Cook had fallen out of favor with them when he voted against Andrew Jackson in the contingent election of 1825. Duncan successfully ran as a Jacksonian, winning 6,322 votes to Cook's 5,619. He was re-elected twice to the at-large district and in 1832 won a fourth term representing the newly created 3rd district. Duncan first went to Congress as a Jacksonian Democrat, but his relationship with President Jackson's party worsened during his career in Congress. By 1834 he voted more often with the opposition Whigs. His final break with the Democrats occurred in June 1834, when he voted to recharter the Bank of the United States. With the help of Democrats unaware of Duncan's change in politics, Duncan was elected governor that year without campaigning or even visiting Illinois.

In his mid-term address two years later, Governor Duncan asked the legislature to pass a state Internal Improvements Act, which would authorize the construction of numerous roads, railroads, bridges, river and harbor improvements, and canals across the state. Attempting to deal with the national economic Panic of 1837 and seeing the costs of internal improvements piling up, Duncan asked the legislature to repeal the program. Legislators ignored the governor, adding even more projects to the program. While the number of improvements were few, the program accumulated debt that almost forced the state into bankruptcy. The first bill for the $15 million that had been borrowed to pay for the program was more than double the state's annual revenue. The debt from the Internal Improvements Act would not be fully paid off until 1882, costing the state more in interest than in the dollar amounts to actually build the so-called improvements throughout the state.

It was also during Duncan's tenure that the state capital was moved from Vandalia, Fayette County, Illinois, to its current location, Springfield, Sangamon County, Illinois. This was controversially done in large part by the successful leadership skills of Springfield's representatives, known as the "Long Nine," one of whom was Abraham Lincoln. Lincoln and the eight other members of his delegation won the capital by trading their votes to win the capital for Springfield for projects for other representatives' districts. This led to the failed internal improvements program.

Duncan became the Whig candidate for governor in 1842, and his initial opponent died in May, but voters nonetheless elected Democrat Thomas Ford as Illinois' 8th governor, and Democrats also won control over both houses of the Illinois legislature.

== Death and legacy ==
Duncan died at his home in Jacksonville on January 15, 1844, at the age of 49. Interment is at Diamond Grove Cemetery there.

Duncan's home in Jacksonville, the Joseph Duncan House, has been listed on the National Register of Historic Places.

Party political offices
First	Whig nominee for Governor of Illinois; 1834	Succeeded by Cyrus Edwards
Preceded by Cyrus Edwards	Whig nominee for Governor of Illinois; 1842	Succeeded by Thomas M. Kilpatrick
U.S. House of Representatives
Preceded by Daniel P. Cook	Member of the U.S. House of Representatives from Illinois's at-large congressional district March 4, 1827 – March 3, 1833	Succeeded by District elections
Preceded by District created	Member of the U.S. House of Representatives from Illinois's 3rd congressional district March 4, 1833 – September 21, 1834	Succeeded by William L. May
Political offices
Preceded by William Lee D. Ewing	Governor of Illinois; 1834–1838	Succeeded by Thomas Carlin
