= Joseph Duncan House =

Historic house in Illinois, United States

- U.S. National Register of Historic Places
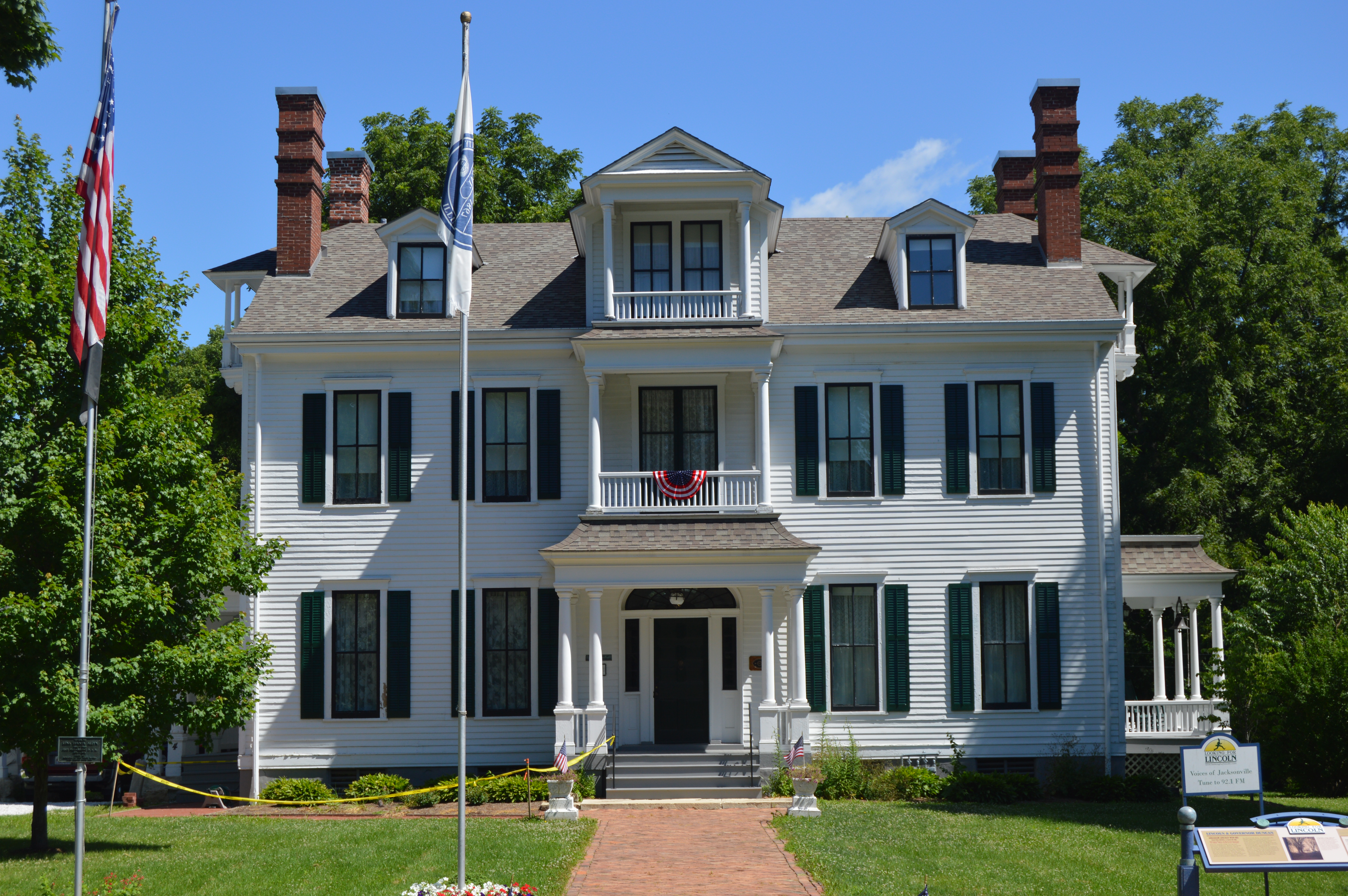

- Location within Illinois Location within the United States
- Location: 4 Duncan Pl., Jacksonville, Illinois
- Coordinates: 39°44′00″N 90°14′57″W
- Area: 25.5 acres (10.3 ha)
- Built: 1833
- Architectural style: Georgian
- NRHP reference No.: 71000294
- Added to NRHP: November 5, 1971

The Joseph Duncan House, also known as the Governor Duncan Mansion, is a historic house located at 4 Duncan Place in Jacksonville, Illinois. The Georgian style house was built in 1833 for Illinois politician Joseph Duncan. Duncan served as Illinois' representative in the U.S. House of Representatives from 1827 to 1834; he was the state's sole representative for all but his last year. After leaving the House, Duncan served as Governor of Illinois from 1834 to 1838. As Illinois had no Governor's Mansion at the time of his election, Duncan's home served as the unofficial governor's mansion during his time in office. The house was added to the National Register of Historic Places on November 5, 1971.

Duncan oversaw the beginning of the Illinois and Michigan Canal's construction in 1836, which he had promoted both in Congress and as governor.

The Governor Duncan Mansion is owned and operated by the Rev. James Caldwell Chapter of the National Society Daughters of the American Revolution (NSDAR), and is open for tours.
