= Philip B. Fouke =

American politician

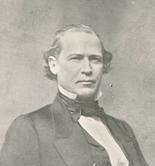

Member of the U.S. House of Representatives from Illinois's 8th district
- In office March 4, 1859 – March 3, 1863
- Preceded by: Robert Smith
- Succeeded by: John T. Stuart

Member of the Illinois House of Representatives
- In office 1851

Personal details
- Born: January 23, 1818 Kaskaskia, Illinois
- Died: October 3, 1876 (aged 58) Washington, D.C., U.S.
- Party: Democratic

Philip Bond Fouke (January 23, 1818 – October 3, 1876) was a U.S. representative from Illinois.

== Biography ==
Born in Kaskaskia, Illinois, Fouke attended the public schools and became a civil engineer. He established and published the Belleville Advocate in 1841. He studied law. He was admitted to the bar in 1845 and commenced practice in Belleville. He served as prosecuting attorney for the Kaskaskia district (second circuit) 1846–1850. He served as member of the State house of representatives in 1851. He unsuccessfully contested the election of Lyman Trumbull to the Thirty-fourth Congress.

Fouke was elected as a Democrat to the Thirty-sixth and Thirty-seventh Congresses (March 4, 1859 – March 3, 1863). He was not a candidate for renomination in 1862. During the Civil War he served as colonel of the 30th Illinois Volunteer Infantry and was wounded at the Battle of Belmont.

After the war, he engaged in the practice of law in Washington, D.C., and died there October 3, 1876. He was interred in the Congressional Cemetery.

U.S. House of Representatives
Preceded by Robert Smith	Member of the U.S. House of Representatives from Illinois's 8th congressional district March 4, 1859 - March 3, 1863	Succeeded by John T. Stuart
