= 1848 Illinois gubernatorial election =

- November 7, 1848
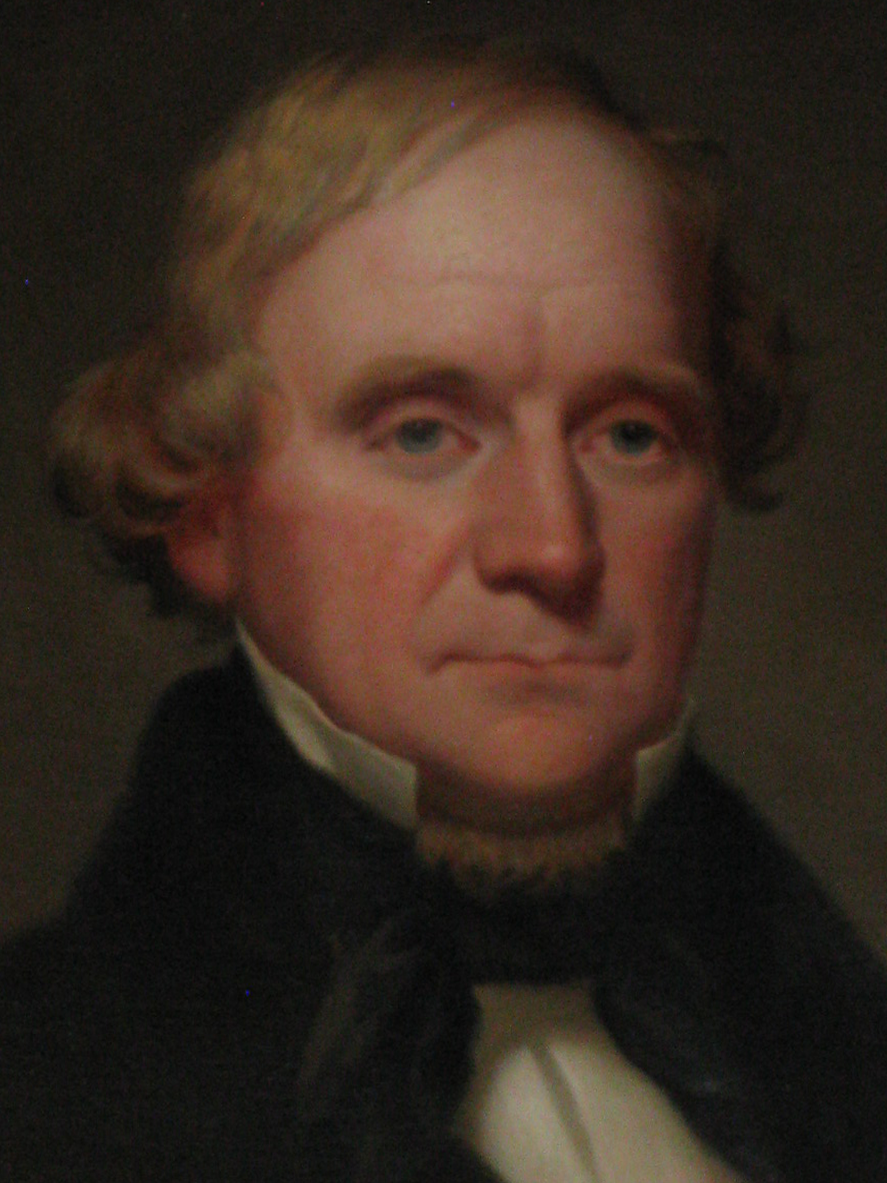

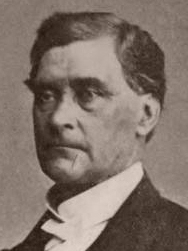
| Nominee | Augustus C. French | W. L. D. Morrison | Charles V. Dyer |
| Party | Democratic | Whig | Free Soil |
| Popular vote | 67,828 | 5,659 | 4,692 |
| Percentage | 86.76% | 7.24% | 6.00% |
- County Results French: 40–50% 50–60% 60–70% 70–80% 80–90% 90–100% Morrison: 40–50% 50–60% Unknown/No Vote
Governor before election
Augustus C. French
Democratic
Elected Governor
Augustus C. French
Democratic

The 1848 Illinois gubernatorial election was held on November 7, 1848. Democratic governor Augustus C. French was easily re-elected. This was the first gubernatorial election in Illinois that was held on the same date as the United States presidential election.

This was the first election in which any governor was elected to a second term. The Illinois Constitution of 1818, which had been replaced this same year, prohibited more than one consecutive term as governor, and Thomas Duncan was the only governor ever to attempt a second term, though it was not consecutive.

== General election ==
=== Candidates ===
- Charles V. Dyer, Chicago physician and abolitionist (Free Soil)
- Augustus C. French, incumbent governor since 1846 (Democratic)
- W. L. D. Morrison (Whig)

=== Results ===
1848 gubernatorial election, Illinois
| Party | Candidate | Votes | % | ±% |
|---|---|---|---|---|
| Democratic | Augustus C. French (incumbent) | 67,828 | 86.76% | +28.56% |
| Whig | W. L. D. Morrison | 5,659 | 7.24% | −29.45% |
| Free Soil | Charles V. Dyer | 4,692 | 6.00% | +0.89% |
| Majority | | 62,169 | 79.52% | N/A |
| Turnout | | 78,179 | 100.00% | |
| Democratic hold | | Swing | | |

== See also ==
- 1848 Illinois lieutenant gubernatorial election
