= John Moore (Illinois politician) =

American politician

"Honest" John Moore

9th Illinois Treasurer
- In office 1848–1857
- Governor: Augustus C. French; Joel Aldrich Matteson
- Preceded by: Milton Carpenter
- Succeeded by: James Miller

9th Lieutenant Governor of Illinois
- In office 1842–1846
- Governor: Thomas Ford
- Preceded by: Stinson Anderson
- Succeeded by: Joseph Wells

Member of the Illinois House of Representatives
- In office 1836

Member of the Illinois Senate

Personal details
- Born: September 8, 1793 Lincolnshire, England
- Died: September 23, 1863 (aged 70)
- Party: Democrat

John Moore (September 8, 1793 – September 23, 1866), nicknamed "Honest John", was an English American politician who served as Lieutenant Governor of Illinois. He also served in the Mexican–American War as lieutenant colonel and 9th Illinois State Treasurer.

== Biography ==
John Moore was born in Lincolnshire, England on September 8, 1793. An orphan for most of his childhood, he immigrated to the United States when he was twenty years old. After briefly living in Virginia, Moore settled in Hamilton County, Ohio. In 1830, he again headed westward to Randolph Township, McLean County, Illinois and became a wheelwright. A year later, he was elected a justice of the peace. Moore quickly rose to prominence in the Democratic Party, and by 1836, he was elected to the Illinois House of Representatives. He served two two-year terms before Moore was elected to the Illinois Senate, serving one two-year term. In 1842, he was put forth as the Democratic nominee for Lieutenant Governor of Illinois with Adam W. Snyder, who died before election day. Moore was elected, defeating W. H. Henderson by seven thousand votes, and served under Governor Thomas Ford. He was the chairman of the Illinois Democratic Committee from 1846 to 1848.

After Moore's Lieutenant Governor term expired, he enlisted in the 4th Regiment of Illinois Volunteers for the Mexican–American War. He was named lieutenant colonel, second-in-command under Edward Dickinson Baker. Moore led the A, F, and G companies in the Siege of Veracruz, one of the first groups to land ashore. Upon his return to Illinois in 1848, he was elected Illinois Treasurer, serving for seven years. Moore was a leading candidate for the Democratic nomination for Illinois Governor in 1856, but William Alexander Richardson was instead put forth. Moore was the lone Democrat serving as state officer, and was re-elected as treasurer that year. His work in this position earned him the nickname "Honest John Moore". He reprised his role as chairman of the Illinois Democratic Committee from 1858 to 1860, then again from 1862 until his death on September 23, 1866.

Party political offices
Preceded by Stinson Anderson	Democratic nominee for Lieutenant Governor of Illinois; 1842	Succeeded by Joseph Wells
First	Democratic nominee for Illinois Treasurer; 1854, 1856	Succeeded by William B. Fondey
Political offices
Preceded by Stinson Anderson	Lieutenant Governor of Illinois; 1842–1846	Succeeded by Joseph Wells
Preceded by Milton Carpenter	Illinois Treasurer; 1848–1857	Succeeded by James Miller
