= Stinson Anderson =

American politician

Stinson H. Anderson (April 21, 1800 – September 1857) was an American politician who served as the Lieutenant Governor of Illinois between 1838 and 1842.

== Early life ==
Stinson Anderson was born in Sumner County in Tennessee. In 1826, he was moved to Mount Vernon, Illinois. During the Black Hawk War Anderson enlisted as a private in the mounted volunteers of Illinois, staff sergeant major in the battalion of spies and in the United States Army as a lieutenant.

== Political career ==
He joined the Democratic Party and in 1832 he was elected to the Illinois House of Representatives. In 1835 he was appointed warden of the state penitentiary in Alton. He resigned this post in 1837 to reenlisted in the army as a captain in the 2nd regiment of Dragoons and served in the Second Seminole War based in Fort Call in Volusia, Florida. He rose to the rank of colonel and mustered out in 1838.

In 1838 he was elected to the office of the Lieutenant Governor of Illinois over William H. Davidson with 33,335 votes to 28716. He served in this position between 7 December 1838 and 8 December 1842 when his term ended. In this function he was the deputy of Governor Thomas Carlin. In 1840 he ran unsuccessfully for a seat in the United States House of Representatives. In 1842 he moved to a farm south of Mount Vernon where he bred horses. In 1845 he was appointed U.S. Marshall for the district of northern Illinois which he held until 1849.

He lived in Jefferson County, Illinois and his name appears in the 1850 census where he was listed as a widower with several of his children and several unrelated children. Stinson Anderson died in September 1857 in Jefferson County and was buried on the Old Union Cemetery in Mount Vernon, Illinois.

== Family ==
He married Candace Pickering in Jefferson County, Illinois on July 3, 1829. They had several children before Candace died in 1849

- William B. Anderson, became a brevet brigadier general at the end of the U.S. Civil War. He later served in the Illinois Senate and the U.S. House of Representatives.
- Sarah, married "Judge Tanner of the Circuit Court"
- Martha, married Col. G.W. Evans
- DeWitt, served as a lieutenant in the Civil War, where he was taken prisoner and held at Libby Prison.
- Edward, died at the battle of Fort Donelson
- Nebraska, married Robert A.D. Wilbanks, clerk of the Illinois House in 1884

Party political offices
First	Democratic nominee for Lieutenant Governor of Illinois; 1838	Succeeded by John Moore
Political offices
Preceded by William Davidson	Lieutenant Governor of Illinois; 1838–1842	Succeeded by John Moore
