= Richard Eells =

American abolitionist and physician (1800–1846)

Richard Eells (1800–1846) was an abolitionist and medical doctor from Illinois. Born in Connecticut, he moved to Quincy, Illinois, in 1833. A Yale College graduate, he set up a medical practice and quickly involved himself in abolitionism. His house became known as a place of refuge for escaped slaves.

On August 21, 1842, an escaped slave known only as Charley, owned by Chauncey Durkee of Monticello, Missouri, came to the house seeking help and transport. A freedman, Barryman Barnett, had spotted Charley swimming across the Mississippi and directed him to Eells’s house. Dr. Eells attempted to hide Charley in his carriage and drive across town, to where a safer hiding place awaited. However, a posse of slave catchers tried to intercept them. Charley was returned to Durkee, who requested that Eells be charged with “harboring and secreting a fugitive slave”, a crime in the Illinois Criminal Code at the time.

County Circuit Judge Stephen A. Douglas fined Eells $400. He appealed the ruling to the Illinois Supreme Court in 1844, where he lost again.

In the meantime, the celebrated case brought Eells to the attention of the wider abolitionist movement. He was made president of the Illinois Anti-Slavery Party in 1843. He unsuccessfully ran for governor of Illinois in 1846. However, the costly legal proceedings undermined Eells’s finances and health. Exhausted and ill, he died on a river boat on the Ohio River near Cincinnati in 1846.

Nevertheless, Eells’s estate continued the appeal process up to the U.S. Supreme Court. Here, abolitionist senators Salmon P. Chase and William H. Seward made the case for Eells’s innocence. Despite the heavy weight of this defense team, the Supreme Court was unwilling to challenge the national status quo, which at the time was sympathetic to slave owners. Eells’s conviction for “harboring and secreting a fugitive slave” was upheld in 1852. In 2015, Quincy Mayor Chuck Shultz sought a posthumous pardon for Dr. Eells, and it was finally granted by Governor Pat Quinn. Dr. Eells's house in the South Side German Historic District of Quincy has been restored and is open to the public.
