= 1848 New York gubernatorial election =

- November 7, 1848
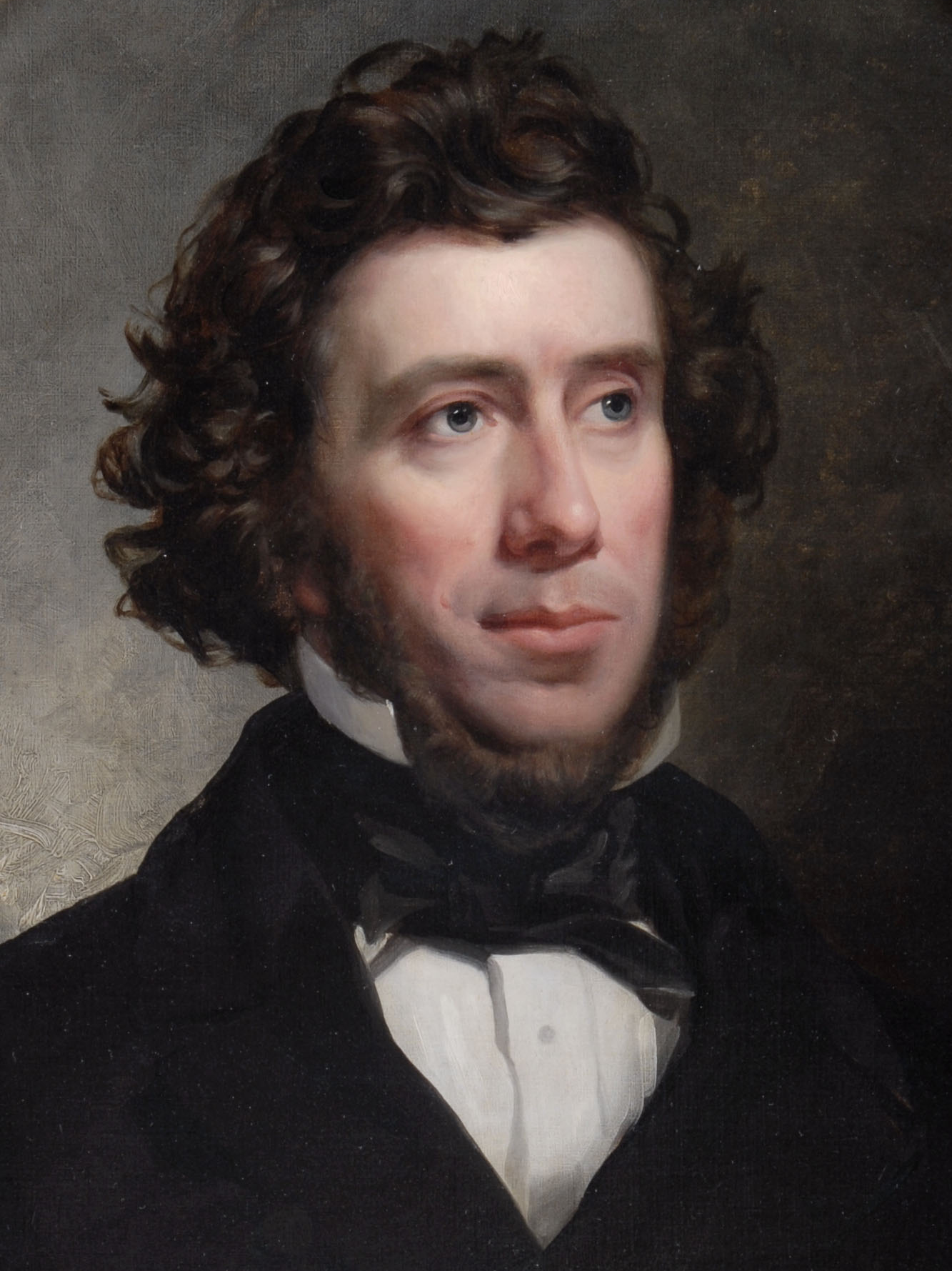

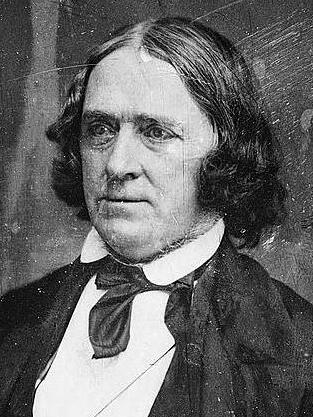

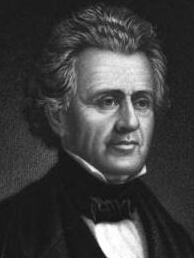
Nominee	Hamilton Fish	John Adams Dix	Reuben H. Walworth
Party	Whig	Free Soil	Democratic
Popular vote	218,776	122,889	116,907
Percentage	47.55%	26.71%	25.39%
- County results Fish: 30–40% 40–50% 50–60% Dix: 30–40% 40–50% 50–60% 60–70% Walworth: 40–50%
Governor before election
John Young
Whig
Elected Governor
Hamilton Fish
Whig

The 1848 New York gubernatorial election was held on November 7, 1848. Incumbent Governor John Young was not nominated for a second term in office by the Whig Party. The Whig nomination went to Hamilton Fish, who won the general election over split Democratic opposition following the defection of the "Barnburner" faction to form the new Free Soil Party.

== Background ==
At the Democratic state convention in Syracuse in September 1847, the "Barnburner" faction of the party, which was opposed to slavery, defected to hold their own convention. When they met at Herkimer on October 26, they did not nominate a ticket but instructed supporters to "vote as they must do when no regular nominations have been made", implicitly endorsing the Whig nominees. The result was the election of the entire Whig ticket and the formation of a new anti-slavery party, the Free Soil Party.

The Anti-Rent movement, which had won reforms in the new Constitution of 1846, also began to dissolve following the 1847 elections.

== Democratic nomination ==
=== Candidates ===
- Greene C. Bronson, judge of the New York Court of Appeals and former New York Attorney General
- Zadock Pratt, former U.S. Representative from Prattsville
- Reuben H. Walworth, former Chancellor of New York

=== Results ===
The Democratic convention was held on September 5 in Syracuse. Reuben Walworth was nominated on the first ballot.

1848 Democratic convention
Party	Candidate	Votes	%
Democratic	Reuben H. Walworth	98	79.03%
Democratic	Zadock Pratt	23	18.55%
Democratic	Greene C. Bronson	3	2.42%
Total votes		124	100.00%

== Whig nomination ==
=== Candidates ===
- Hamilton Fish, Lieutenant Governor of New York
- Joshua A. Spencer, mayor of Utica and former U.S. Attorney for the Northern District of New York
- John Young, incumbent Governor since 1847

=== Results ===
The Whig state convention met on September 13 in Utica. Fish was nominated on the first ballot.

1848 Whig convention
Party	Candidate	Votes	%
Whig	Hamilton Fish	76	61.29%
Whig	Joshua A. Spencer	28	22.58%
Whig	John Young (incumbent)	20	16.13%
Total votes		124	100.00%

== Free Soil and Liberty nominations ==
The Barnburner-Free Soil state convention was held on September 13 and 14 at the Court House in Utica. Former U.S. Senator John Adams Dix was nominated by acclamation. The Liberty state convention also met on the same day in the same city, and after passing resolutions, the delegates walked to the Court House and sat with the Free Soil convention as honorary members. However, they did not endorse the Free Soil ticket.

== General election ==
=== Candidates ===
- John Adams Dix, U.S. Senator (Free Soil)
- Hamilton Fish, Lieutenant Governor of New York (Whig)
- William Goodell, founder of the American Anti-Slavery Society (Liberty)
- Reuben H. Walworth, former Chancellor of New York (Democratic)

=== Results ===
1848 New York gubernatorial election
Party	Candidate	Votes	%	±%
Whig	Hamilton Fish	218,776	47.55%	▼1.93
Free Soil	John Adams Dix	122,889	26.71%	N/A
Democratic	Reuben H. Walworth	116,811	25.39%	▼20.82
Liberty	William Goodell	1,593	0.35%	▼2.82
Total votes		460,069	100.00%	

== See also ==
- New York gubernatorial elections
- New York state elections
