= 1848 Missouri lieutenant gubernatorial election =

- August 7, 1848
Nominee	Thomas L. Price
Party	Democratic
Popular vote	Unknown
Percentage	100.00%
Lieutenant Governor before election
James Young
Democratic
Elected Lieutenant Governor
Thomas L. Price
Democratic

The 1848 Missouri lieutenant gubernatorial election was held on August 7, 1848, in order to elect the lieutenant governor of Missouri. Democratic nominee and former Mayor of Jefferson City Thomas L. Price won the election as he ran unopposed. The exact results of the election are unknown.

== General election ==
On election day, August 7, 1848, Democratic nominee Thomas L. Price won the election as he ran unopposed, thereby retaining Democratic control over the office of lieutenant governor. Price was sworn in as the 8th lieutenant governor of Missouri on November 20, 1848.

=== Results ===
Missouri lieutenant gubernatorial election, 1848
Party	Candidate	Votes	%
Democratic	Thomas L. Price	Unknown	100.00
Total votes		Unknown	100.00
Democratic hold			

== See also ==
- 1848 Missouri gubernatorial election
