= 1848 Salvadoran presidential election =

- 29 January 1848
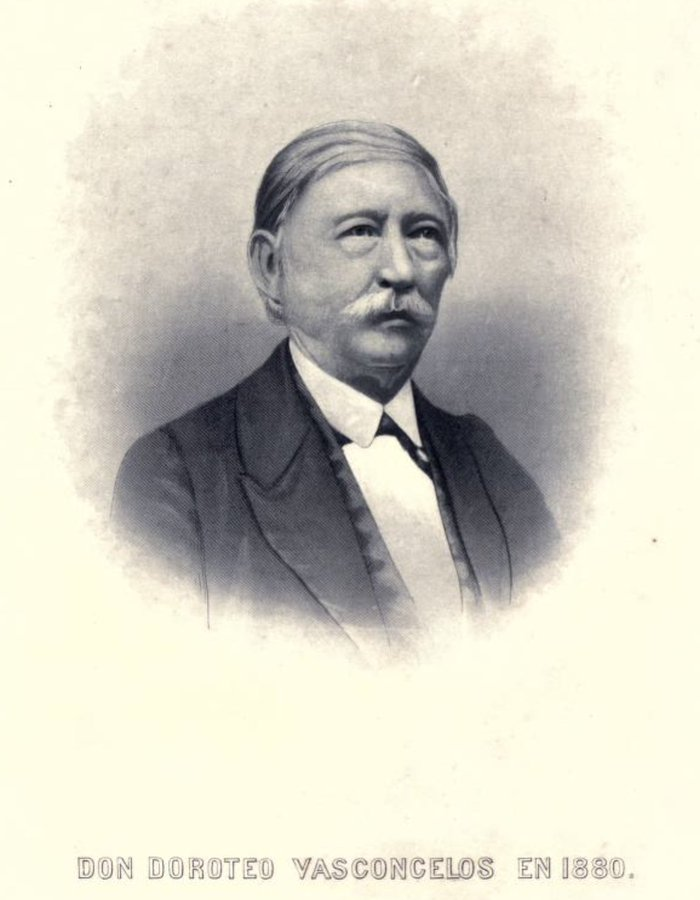
Candidate	Doroteo Vasconcelos
Party	Liberal
Running mate	José Félix Quirós
President before election
José Félix Quirós
Independent
Elected President
Doroteo Vasconcelos
Liberal

Presidential elections were held in El Salvador on 29 January 1848. Doroteo Vasconcelos ran unopposed and was elected by the legislature. He was sworn in on 7 February 1848 and served until 1 February 1850. He ran again in the next election when a constitutional amendment was made to allow his reelection.

== Results ==
Candidate	Party
Doroteo Vasconcelos	Liberal
Total
Source: University of California, San Diego
