= 1848 Connecticut lieutenant gubernatorial election =

- April 5, 1848
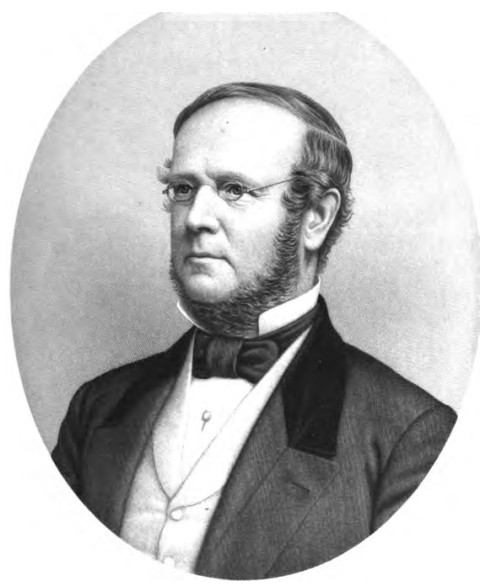

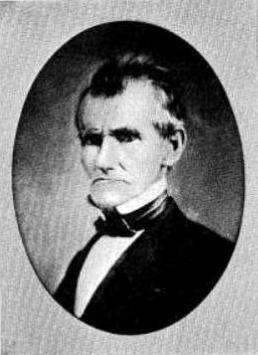
Nominee	Charles J. McCurdy	Origen S. Seymour
Party	Whig	Democratic
Popular vote	30,847	28,780
Percentage	50.30%	46.90%
Lieutenant Governor before election
Charles J. McCurdy
Whig
Elected Lieutenant Governor
Charles J. McCurdy
Whig

The 1848 Connecticut lieutenant gubernatorial election was held on April 5, 1848, to elect the lieutenant governor of Connecticut. Incumbent Whig lieutenant governor Charles J. McCurdy won re-election against Democratic nominee and former member of the Connecticut House of Representatives Origen S. Seymour.

== General election ==
On election day, April 5, 1848, incumbent Whig lieutenant governor Charles J. McCurdy won re-election with 50.30% of the vote, thereby retaining Whig control over the office of lieutenant governor. McCurdy was sworn in for his second term on May 3, 1848.

=== Results ===
Connecticut lieutenant gubernatorial election, 1848
Party	Candidate	Votes	%
Whig	Charles J. McCurdy (incumbent)	30,847	50.30
Democratic	Origen S. Seymour	28,780	46.90
	Scattering	1,752	2.80
Total votes		61,379	100.00
Whig hold			
