= 1848 Virginia gubernatorial election =

- December 12, 1848
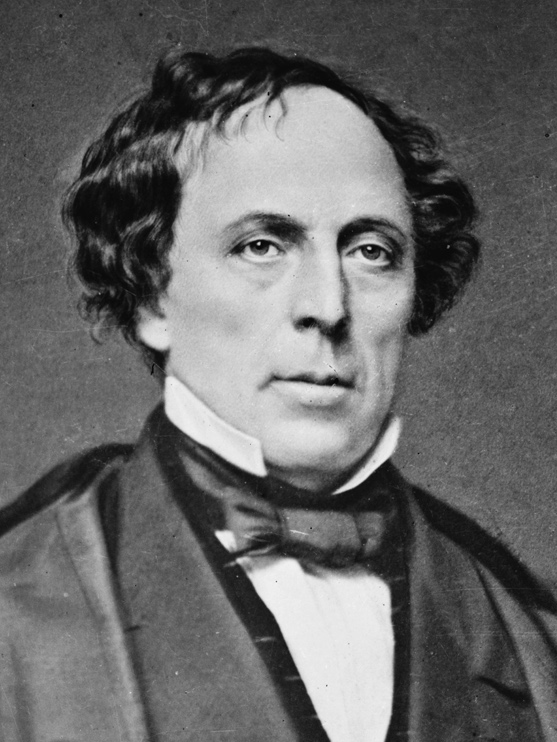

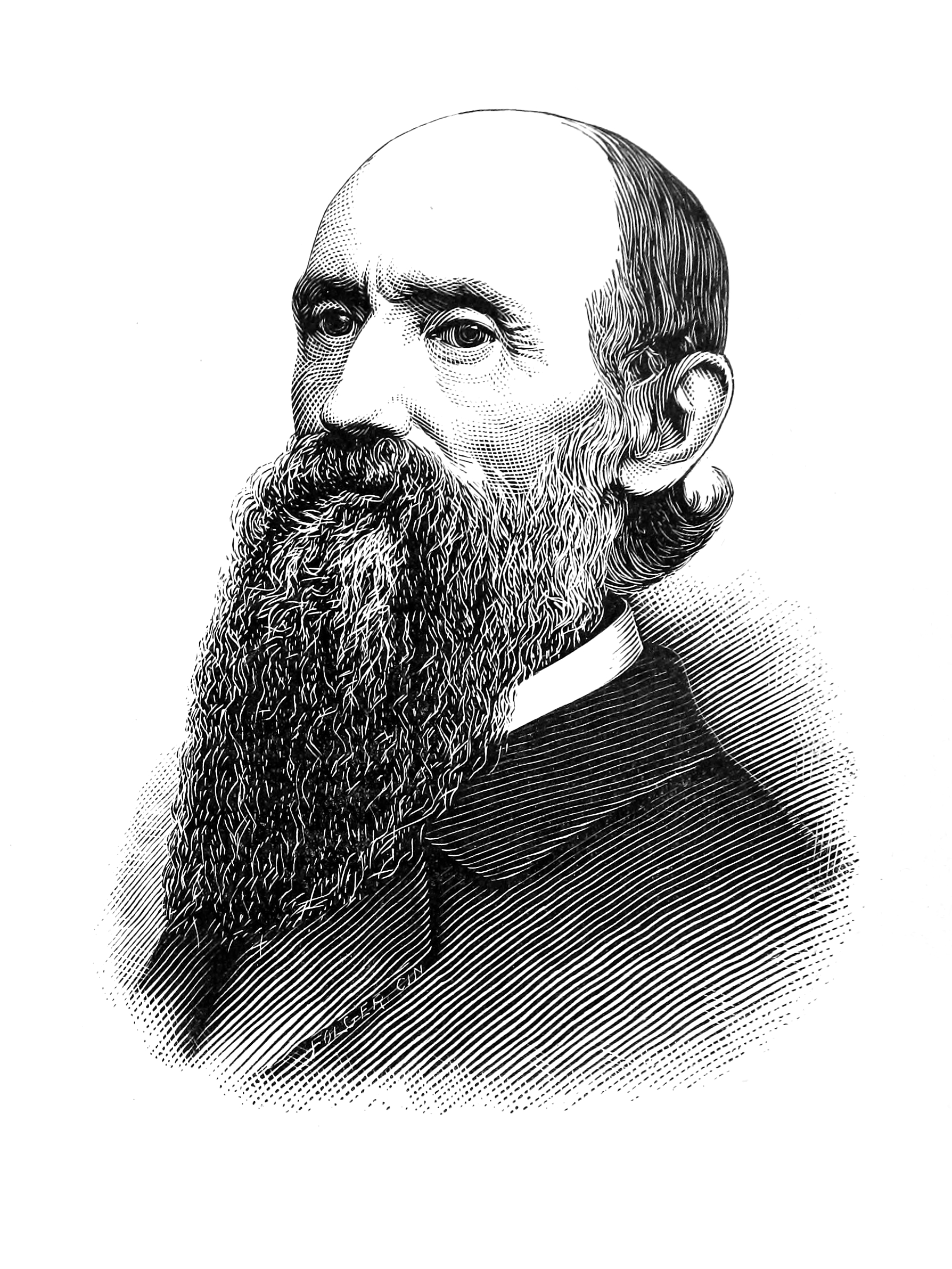

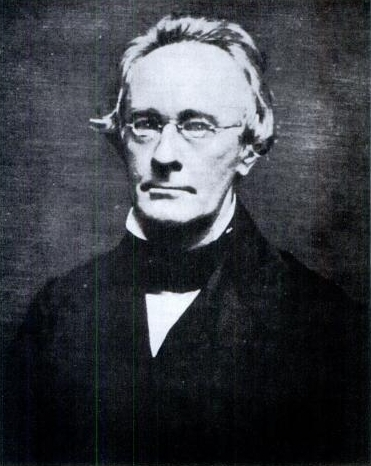

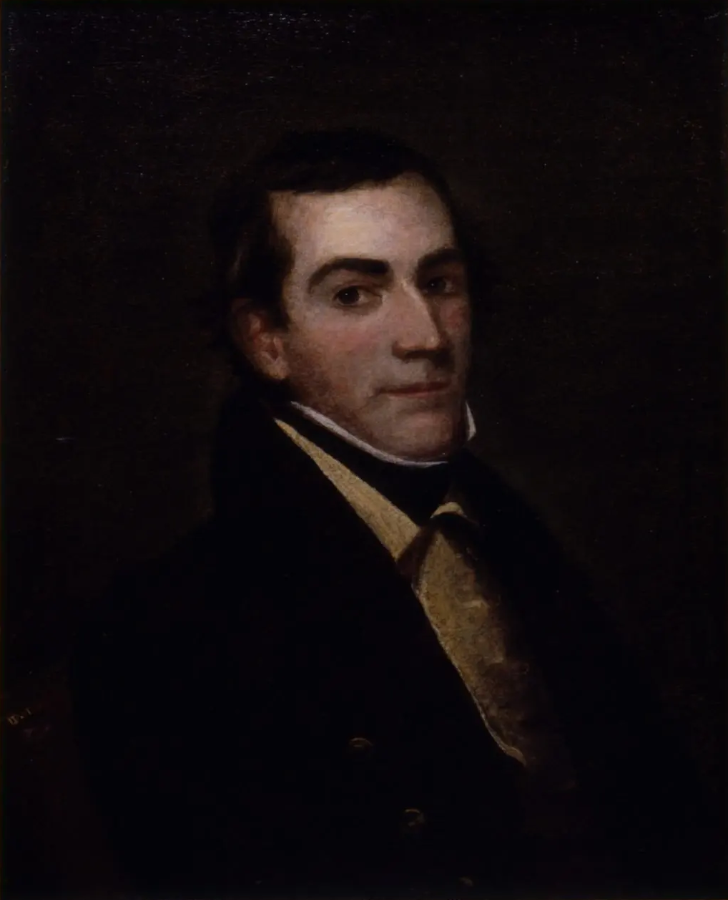

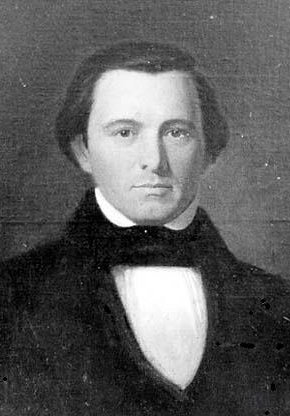
Nominee	John B. Floyd	George W. Thompson	Green Berry Samuels
Party	Democratic	Democratic	Democratic
1st ballot	47	34	25
3rd ballot	96	55	—
Nominee	William Daniel	George W. Summers
Party	Democratic	Whig
1st ballot	23	14
3rd ballot	—	1
Governor before election
William Smith
Democratic
Elected Governor
John B. Floyd
Democratic

A gubernatorial election was held in Virginia on December 12, 1848. The Democratic member of the Virginia House of Delegates from Washington County John B. Floyd defeated the Democratic judge of the United States District Court for the Western District of Virginia George W. Thompson.

The incumbent governor of Virginia William Smith was ineligible for re-election due to term limits established by the Constitution of Virginia. Floyd attracted support based on his stance favoring internal improvements for Western Virginia, as well as from Whigs who considered him the most acceptable of the Democratic candidates.

The election was conducted by the Virginia General Assembly in joint session. No candidate had a majority on the first ballot, requiring two additional rounds of voting. Floyd was elected with a majority on the third ballot.

== General election ==
1848 Virginia gubernatorial election
Party	Candidate	Ballot		
Party	Candidate	1st	2nd	3rd
Democratic	John B. Floyd	47	72	96
Democratic	George W. Thompson	34	48	55
Democratic	Green Berry Samuels	25	—N/a	
Democratic	William Daniel	23	27	—N/a
Whig	George W. Summers	14	7	1
Democratic	John Y. Mason	5	6	6
Whig	William Cabell Rives	2	1	—N/a
Whig	Valentine W. Southall	2	—N/a	
Whig	Allen T. Caperton	1	—N/a	
Whig	John Janney	1	—N/a	
Whig	James Lyons	1	—N/a	
Whig	John Pendleton	1	—N/a	
—N/a	James F. Preston	1	—N/a	
Whig	William B. Preston	1	—N/a	1
Whig	Alexander Hugh Holmes Stuart	1	—N/a	
—N/a	John W. Syme	1	—N/a	
Whig	Samuel Watts	1	1	2
Total		161	162	165

== Bibliography ==
- Luebke, Peter (2020). "John B. Floyd (1806–1863)". Encyclopedia Virginia.
- Virginia (1848a). Journal of the House of Delegates [...]. Richmond.
- Virginia (1848b). Journal of the Senate [...]. Richmond.
