= Thomas Ford (politician) =

Governor of Illinois from 1842 to 1846

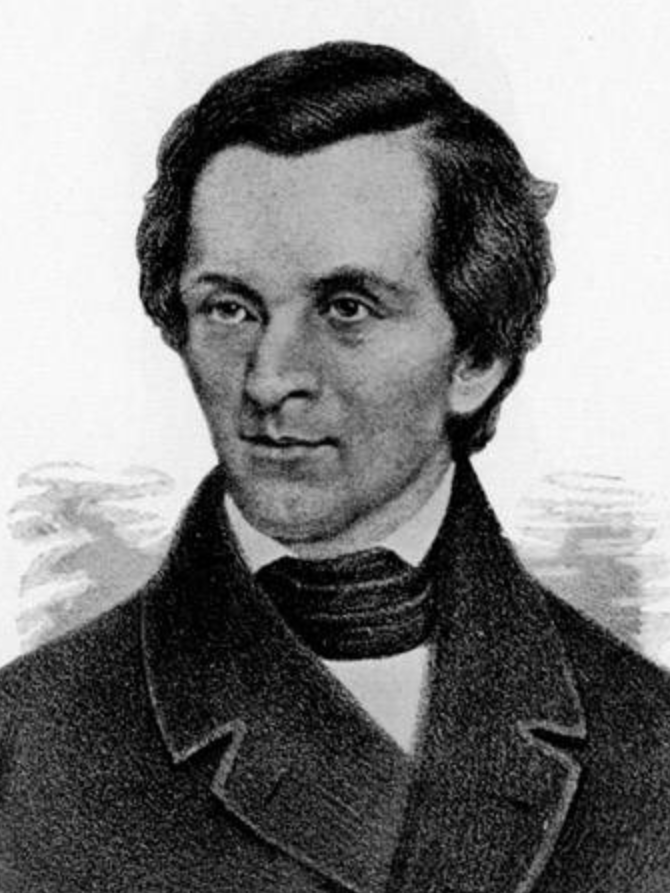

8th Governor of Illinois
- In office December 8, 1842 – December 9, 1846
- Lieutenant: John Moore
- Preceded by: Thomas Carlin
- Succeeded by: Augustus C. French

Personal details
- Born: December 5, 1800 Uniontown, Pennsylvania, US
- Died: November 3, 1850 (aged 49) Peoria, Illinois, US
- Party: Democratic
- Spouse: Frances Hambaugh (m. 1828)
- Profession: Lawyer, judge

Thomas Ford (December 5, 1800 – November 3, 1850) was a lawyer, judge, author and the eighth governor of Illinois. The first Illinois governor to be raised in the state, he served from 1842 to 1846 and became known for restoring the state's solvency and reducing geographic sectionalism, as well as for leading the legislature despite his lack of prior political experience. A lifelong Democrat, Ford is also remembered for anti-Mormon sentiments and vacillation which led to the death of Joseph Smith, and the subsequent Illinois Mormon War of 1844–1845.

== Early and family life ==
Ford was born near Uniontown, Pennsylvania. His twice widowed Irish mother, the former Elizabeth Logue Ford Delaney, took him and his siblings west in 1804, hoping to cross the Mississippi River and homestead on free or cheap land. As they neared St. Louis, she learned about the Louisiana Purchase, and that land was no longer cheap there because it now belonged to the United States. She settled her family in New Design in Monroe County, Illinois instead.

His six-year older half-brother, George Forquer, helped raise Thomas, and later served in both houses of the Illinois legislature, as well as appointments as the state's attorney general and secretary of state, but would lose to Whig Joseph Duncan when he tried to run for a seat in the U.S. House of Representatives. Forquer was initially a merchant, and then a partner of Daniel Pope Cook, with whom he platted the town of Waterloo, Illinois (also in Monroe County). With Forquer's support, Ford studied law for one term at Transylvania University in Lexington, Kentucky, but walked back home to Illinois after learning that Forquer's business had failed. Ford then worked on local farms, taught school and read law under Cook, who would become the state's first attorney general, as well as member of Congress and namesake of Cook County, where Ford would later serve as judge for several years.

Ford married 15-year-old Frances Hambaugh on September 11, 1828 in Cahokia (in Monroe County, Illinois). They would have five children, but the family was never wealthy. Her father, Henry Hambaugh, was of German descent and had emigrated from Virginia through Kentucky and taught school in Edwardsville for a time before buying a farm in Versailles in 1828; her brother Stephen Hambaugh, also a devout Catholic, had a transport business between Edwardsville and St. Louis before moving to Versailles to farm. The couple had three daughters and two sons, all of whom were orphaned as children and raised by Peoria community members. The eldest daughter, Anna Ford Davies (1834-1910), was also the last to die; her sisters were Mary Frances Ford Bailey (1837-1909) and Julia Ford (1842-1862, unmarried)). Their oldest brother, named either Sewell or George Ford (1844-1874), volunteered for the Union Army during the Civil War and lost an arm while fighting with an Illinois regiment, then moved west with his younger brother Thomas H.(1847-1874). Thomas was lynched by a Kansas mob alongside an alleged horse thief, and when Sewell (who worked as a bartender due to his disability) tried to have the leaders held accountable, he too was lynched. Ford was accused of taking "stimulants" as governor, some suggesting politics harmed what could have been an important legal career, but while evidence exists as to the parents' ultimately fatal medical conditions, and Ford's less-than-robust constitution even before his gubernatorial term, definitive evidence of drug abuse is lacking.

== Legal career ==
After admission to the Illinois bar, possibly in 1820, Ford briefly worked for a pro-Andrew Jackson newspaper in St. Louis, then practiced law at Waterloo and after Cook's re-election to Congress in 1824, in Cook's hometown of Edwardsville, Illinois.

After Ford married, the couple moved further north up the Mississippi River to the newly founded mining boom town of Galena in the newly created Jo Daviess County, Illinois. However, his legal practice still failed to prosper (his retiring demeanor and high voice perhaps contributing factors), and Ford lost an election to become the local justice of the peace. Instead, Ford become a member of the commission to establish Illinois's northern boundary (with Wisconsin), which necessitated considerable time at the then-state capital in Vandalia, Illinois.

Ford also learned about the state legislature while serving as clerk for various committees, and would later claim that he attended every legislative session from 1825 to 1847. In 1829, with Forquer's aid, Ford received a gubernatorial appointment as the state's attorney (prosecutor) for the Military Tract District in Western Illinois (a huge district between the Illinois and Mississippi Rivers). He soon moved his family to his father-in-law's farm in Versailles (then in Schuyler County, Illinois, but since 1839 in Brown County, Illinois).

During the Black Hawk War of 1832, Ford did not resign that office but enlisted in Colonel Samuel Whiteside's Spy Battalion. (His brother may have begun spying on Chief Black Hawk before the war formally began, as disaffected young warriors had begun raiding white settlements.) Ford served as the local prosecutor for the northwestern section of the state until 1835, and also achieved recognition as one of three defense counsel for Illinois Supreme Court Justice Theophilus W. Smith, who had married Ford and his wife in 1828 and survived an impeachment trial in 1833. Not long after Forquer became the state senator for Sangamon County, Illinois, the legislature elected Ford a state court judge for northern Illinois (9th circuit). Ford would serve two terms (notwithstanding his resignation in 1837 to care for Forquer, who had tuberculosis and had moved to Cincinnati for medical treatment and where he died), as well as one term as a municipal judge in the newly chartered city of Chicago. Judge Ford presided over the initial action in the Jean Baptiste Beaubien land claim (concerning the land under the soon-to-be-decommissioned Fort Dearborn), and his decision (against the transferee of the long-term settler and trader next to the partially-decommissioned fort) was ultimately upheld by the United States Supreme Court in Wilcox v. Jackson.

Ford joined the Supreme Court of Illinois as an associate justice in February 1841, as the Democratic-majority legislature increased that bench to nine members (from four). The other new justices were former U.S. Senator Sidney Breese, future U.S. Senator Stephen A. Douglas, Walter B. Scates and Samuel H. Treat. Upon agreement with his colleagues, Ford was assigned circuit duties on the northern circuit and moved to Oregon in Ogle County, Illinois, but would ultimately only serve as associate justice on that court for little more than a year.

== Governorship ==
In 1842, the Democratic candidate for Illinois governor, state senator Adam W. Snyder died in May, just months before the election. Although Ford had never held an elective office, he learned while holding court in Ottawa, Illinois on May 25, 1842 that he had become his party's candidate against Whig Joseph Duncan, a previous governor and long a political nemesis of Ford's family. Although some thought Duncan would win because of rising anti-Latter-day Saint sentiment (and the Latter-day Saint leader Joseph Smith had told his followers to vote for Democrat Snyder), Ford won 57% of the vote and became the state's 8th governor. Democrats also won large majorities in both houses of the legislature.

When the relatively unknown Governor Ford took office, the state's finances were in terrible shape. The immediate outgoing governor, Thomas Carlin, recommended cancelling the charters of the Illinois State Bank, as well as the Bank of Illinois in Shawneetown. Ford worried this would scare eastern financiers, whose loans were needed to finish various internal improvements, as well as buy mundane items such as postage stamps. The state's ongoing fiscal problems were due to the Panic of 1837, as well as political horsetrading which had led to a fiscally imprudent Internal Improvements Act during Governor Duncan's tenure, in exchange for moving the state capital in 1837 from too-small Vandalia to Springfield, Illinois. Debt for the Illinois and Michigan Canal alone stood at over $15 million, and further sums were owed for newly begun railroads and other canals. Ford also believed that only about $200,000 or $300,000 in "good money" was circulating in the entire state before he took office, due to the persistent depression. Nonetheless, his inaugural speech urged paying the bonds' principal and interest in full, and for the 1842-1843 legislative session Ford drafted a bill allowing the two banks to surrender their charters in exchange for state bonds, warrants and scrip, which extinguished $2.3 million of the state debt. Unlike Carlin, Ford also accepted land sale proceeds from the federal government. Then he raised taxes. The Illinois and Michigan Canal would be completed about a year after Ford left office, although the Act's debt would not be paid off until 1882. Ford greatly improved the state's finances, and the canal would further increase northern Illinois' population and a demographic shift in the state. Whereas early settlers had arrived from Virginia and Kentucky on via the Ohio River, or from New York and other northern states via the National Road (which ended in Vandalia, and which the Army Corps of Engineers had rebuilt in the 1830s but congress stopped funding before 1840), construction of the canal had also encouraged immigration from Europe and further immigrants would arrive via the Great Lakes and newly organized railroads.

As Ford's gubernatorial term ended in early 1847, his criticisms of the now-outmoded Illinois Constitution led to a constitutional convention later in the year, which drafted a new state constitution which took effect in 1848. Among the new constitution's improvements was reducing the Illinois Supreme Court down to three justices while ending circuit duties. Other provisions empowered future governors over state affairs. However, Ford would not participate in the constitutional convention because he left office nearly bankrupt. Both he and his wife had contracted illnesses of which they would die in 1850.

== Illinois Latter-day Saint Expulsion ==
Among members of the Church of Jesus Christ of Latter-day Saints, Ford's tenure as governor is remembered for the "Illinois Mormon Expulsion," particularly as Ford dealt with civic unrest over the Church's city of Nauvoo, Illinois, and with the killing of their leader, Joseph Smith and his brother Hyrum Smith in 1844.

Ford wrote extensively of his dealings with The Church of Jesus Christ of Latter-day Saints community, and was especially critical of their religion. He called Smith "the most successful impostor in modern times," and said he hoped that the increasingly popular Mormonism would not replace traditional Christianity. Ford took some steps to impede the Church of Jesus Christ of Latter-day Saints, but with little results. The conflict grew heated, with hundreds being driven from their homes, and mobs that eventually employed several thousands of people.

At one point, Ford encouraged Joseph and his brother, Hyrum Smith, to go to Carthage, the county seat, to face criminal charges in the destruction of the newspaper, the Nauvoo Expositor. Once there, the Smiths were charged with treason, and Ford allowed two militia units to go home, thus assigning the duty to guard the two brothers to the Carthage Greys, an anti-Church militia that helped murder them on June 27, 1844.

Ford denied responsibility for the mob murders. However, two men later gave affidavits suggesting Ford knew of the plot and could have approved of it. Dan Jones, a riverboat captain and one of the few eyewitnesses to both sides of the event, repeatedly warned Ford throughout the day of comments he heard from the guards and jailkeepers concerning their plot to assassinate the restored Church leaders. In response, Ford supposedly replied, "You are unnecessarily alarmed for your friends' safety, sir. The people are not that cruel." Irritated by the remark, Jones urged the necessity of placing better men than professed assassins to guard them. He stressed that they [the Smiths] were American citizens surrendered to his [Ford's] pledged honor. When Ford showed little interest in Jones' concerns, Jones commented, "[I] had then but one request to make; if you [Ford] left their lives in the hands of those men to be sacrificed, that the Almighty will preserve my life to a proper time and place to testify that you have been timely warned of their danger."] Later that day, returning to Nauvoo on horseback, Jones passed Ford's company while it passed by a painted mob ready to enter Carthage to kill the Church leaders. Jones records that while the assassination was taking place in Carthage, Ford addressed the citizens of Nauvoo saying that a, "severe atonement must be made, so prepare your minds for the emergency." The officials of the governor were heard urging him to hasten from there assuring him that the deed (that is the assassination), "was sure of having been accomplished by then." Both Ford's statement and the comments of his supporting officials provide strong evidence of Ford's involvement. He was later claimed to have said, "it's all nonsense; you will have to drive the Mormons out yet." This is exactly what happened. Several residents of Hancock County and many residents from several surrounding counties, met and decided on a plan of action that later forced the members of The Church of Jesus Christ of Latter-day Saints to retreat into Utah, led by Brigham Young, by 1846.

While Ford opposed the Church, he also claimed to oppose the anti-Church faction that eventually drove them from the state. In the aftermath of the assassinations, Ford ordered the arrest and trial of Thomas C. Sharp, a newspaper editor in Warsaw, Illinois who had often printed disparaging and derogatory remarks against Smith and the Latter-day Saints. Sharp, who had printed calls for violence leading up to Smith's murder and celebratory remarks shortly after the killing, had briefly fled to Missouri to avoid trial. Upon his return to Illinois on Ford's orders, he was later acquitted of all charges.

In later correspondences, Governor Ford would try to defend his meek actions during the crisis, saying hated minorities are never safe from hostile majorities. He claimed "Men engaged in unpopular projects expect more protection from the laws than the laws are able to furnish in the face of popular excitement." He believed that a politicized militia and court system, as well as weak powers granted him by state law, prevented him from doing more to stop the Illinois Mormon War. Writing in the third person, Ford declared "there was no way to punish {the guilty parties}, as former trials had shown, except by martial law; and this course was utterly illegal. The governor believed that he could not declare martial law for the punishment of citizens without admitting that free government had failed; and assuming despotism was necessary in its place."

== Death and legacy ==
Ford initially moved back to the Hambaugh farm after his gubernatorial term ended, but soon moved to Peoria, Illinois. There, he wrote his magnum opus of early Illinois history, as well as attempted to care for his wife (who died of stomach cancer on October 12, 1850; aged 38) and young children, as well as his own tuberculosis. He died on November 3, 1850, about six weeks after joining the local Methodist Church. Because the career civil servant was destitute, the local citizenry raised money to pay for his interment at Springdale Cemetery, Peoria, as well as fostered out his children among various neighbors.

Ford's A History of Illinois (Chicago, 1854), was published posthumously and relates the state history from its founding in 1818 until 1847.

Ford County, Illinois is named for him.

== Notes ==
Party political offices
Preceded by Thomas Carlin	Democratic nominee for Governor of Illinois; 1842	Succeeded by Augustus C. French
Political offices
Preceded by Thomas Carlin	Governor of Illinois; 1842–1846	Succeeded by Augustus C. French
