= James L. D. Morrison =

American politician (1816–1888)

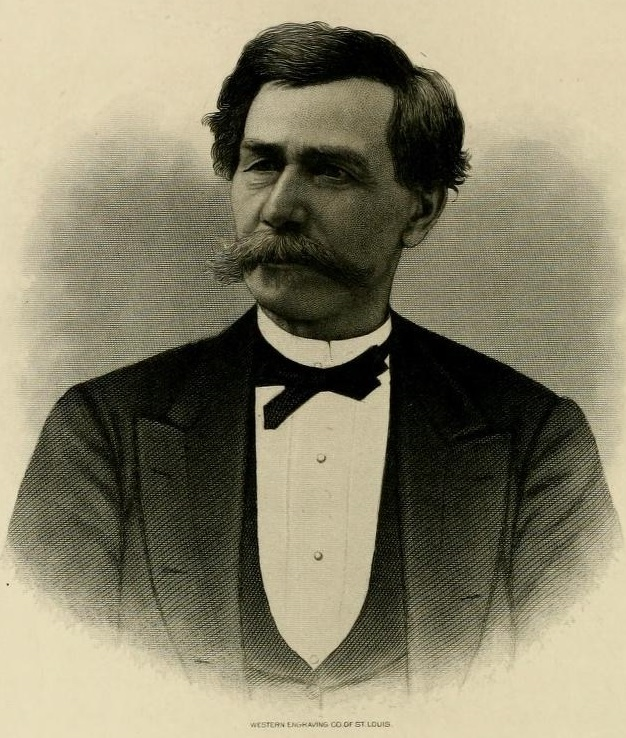
- From 1875's Saint Louis: The Future Great City of the World

Member of the U.S. House of Representatives from Illinois's 8th district
- In office November 4, 1856 – March 3, 1857
- Preceded by: William H. Bissell
- Succeeded by: Robert Smith

Member of the Illinois Senate
- In office 1848

Member of the Illinois House of Representatives
- In office 1844

Personal details
- Born: April 12, 1816 Kaskaskia, Illinois
- Died: August 14, 1888 (aged 72) St. Louis, Missouri, U.S.
- Party: Democratic

James Lowery Donaldson Morrison (April 12, 1816 – August 14, 1888) was a U.S. representative from Illinois.

Born in Kaskaskia, Illinois, Morrison was appointed midshipman in the Navy in 1832 and served until December 31, 1839, when he resigned. He studied law. He was admitted to the bar and commenced practice in Belleville, Illinois. He served as member of the State house of representatives in 1844. Raised a company and served in the Mexican War as lieutenant colonel of Bissell's regiment of Illinois Volunteers from July 1, 1846, to July 1, 1847. He was presented a sword by the Illinois legislature for services at Buena Vista. He served as member of the State senate in 1848. He was an unsuccessful Whig candidate for Lieutenant Governor in 1852.

Morrison was elected as a Democrat to the Thirty-fourth Congress to fill the vacancy caused by the resignation of Lyman Trumbull and served from November 4, 1856, to March 3, 1857. At the same election he was not the nominee for the Thirty-fifth Congress. He was an unsuccessful candidate for the Democratic nomination for Governor of Illinois in 1860. His wife, Mary, was the daughter of Thomas Carlin, who was governor from 1838 to 1842.

Morrison died in St. Louis, Missouri, on August 14, 1888, and was interred in Calvary Cemetery. Morrisonville, Illinois, is named in his honor.

U.S. House of Representatives
Preceded by William H. Bissell	Member of the U.S. House of Representatives from Illinois's 8th congressional district November 4, 1856 - March 3, 1857	Succeeded by Robert Smith
