= William McMurtry =

American politician

11th Lieutenant Governor of Illinois
- In office January 8, 1849 – January 10, 1853
- Governor: Augustus C. French
- Preceded by: Joseph Wells
- Succeeded by: Gustav Koerner

Member of the Illinois House of Representatives
- In office 1836-1840

Member of the Illinois Senate
- In office 1842

Personal details
- Born: February 20, 1801 Mercer County, Kentucky, US
- Died: April 10, 1875 (aged 74) Henderson, Illinois, US
- Party: Democratic
- Spouse: Ruth Champion (1795–1864) (m. 1826–1864)
- Occupation: Farmer, Politician

Military service
- Allegiance: Union
- Branch/service: United States Army; Union Army
- Years of service: 1832, 1861
- Rank: Colonel
- Unit: 102nd Illinois Infantry Regiment
- Battles/wars: Black Hawk War; American Civil War

William McMurtry (February 20, 1801 – April 10, 1875) was the 11th Lieutenant Governor of Illinois and a colonel in the Union Army during the American Civil War.

McMurtry was born in Mercer County, Kentucky. William's parents were James and Elizabeth (Lucas) McMurtry. His great-grandfather, John McMurtry fought in the American Revolution, dying in the Battle of Cowpens. He and his family settled in Crawford County, Indiana in 1818. It was here that William married Ruth Champion (also of Mercer County, Kentucky), on November 23, 1826. In 1829, William and his young family moved to Knox County, Illinois along with his father and brother James and his wife. It was here that William McMurtry's home remained until his death.

McMurtry was appointed in Knox County's first ever election in 1830 as foreman of the grand-jury of the Circuit Court. In 1832 he was elected as the county's first school commissioner. From 1836 to 1840, William was a member of the Illinois House of Representatives. In 1842 he was elected to the Illinois State Senate, where he stayed until being added to the Democratic ticket of Governor Augustus French after the previous Lt. Governor Joseph Wells decided not to run again. During his time in office, 1849–53, a new state constitution was adopted as well as the Galena and Chicago Union Railroad was completed. After his term as lieutenant governor, William ran for office in the US Congress in 1854 in Illinois' 4th Congressional District losing to Opposition/Republican Party candidate James Knox. This effectively was the end of McMurtry's political career, with respect to seeking elected office. McMurtry was known as a close personal friend of fellow Illinois Democrat Stephen A. Douglas and remained a prominent voice in the state's Democratic party in the years before the Civil War.

During the Black Hawk War, McMurtry organized a group of between 70 and 90 men from Knox and Warren counties — which consisted of nearly all the able-bodied men from the area — to form a company of mounted rangers with him serving as captain and his brother James serving as sergeant. At the outset of the Civil War, he organized and led as colonel the 102nd Illinois Infantry, which was made up of men from Knox County. William McMurtry though only served a couple of months before receiving an honorable discharge due to poor health attributed to his advanced age.

At home, McMurtry was known as a bright man, despite only modest formal education, who was an avid reader and good neighbor. William was a Freemason and treasurer of the local Grand Lodge. He and his wife Ruth had five children. William McMurtry died in Henderson, Illinois; a town founded near his farm home after he and his family had settled there.

Party political offices
Preceded by Joseph Wells	Democratic nominee for Lieutenant Governor of Illinois; 1848	Succeeded by Gustav Koerner
Political offices
Preceded by Joseph Wells	Lieutenant Governor of Illinois; 1849–1853	Succeeded by Gustav Koerner
