= Joseph Wells (politician) =

American politician

Joseph B. Wells was an American politician. Between 1846 and 1849 he served as Lieutenant Governor of Illinois.

== Life ==
There are almost no sources available about Joseph Wells. He joined the Democratic Party and in 1846 he was elected to the office of the Lieutenant Governor of Illinois. He served in this position between 9 December 1846 and 8 January 1849. In this function he was the deputy of Governor Augustus C. French. During his term the Constitution of Illinois was revised. The revision included a change of the inauguration dates of the Governor and the Lieutenant Governor from December to the second Monday in January. Details about his life after the end of his term as Lieutenant Governor are unknown.

Party political offices
| Preceded by John Moore | Democratic nominee for Lieutenant Governor of Illinois; 1846 | Succeeded by William McMurtry |
Political offices
| Preceded by John Moore | Lieutenant Governor of Illinois; 1846–1849 | Succeeded by William McMurtry |
