= Augustus C. French =

Governor of Illinois from 1846 to 1853

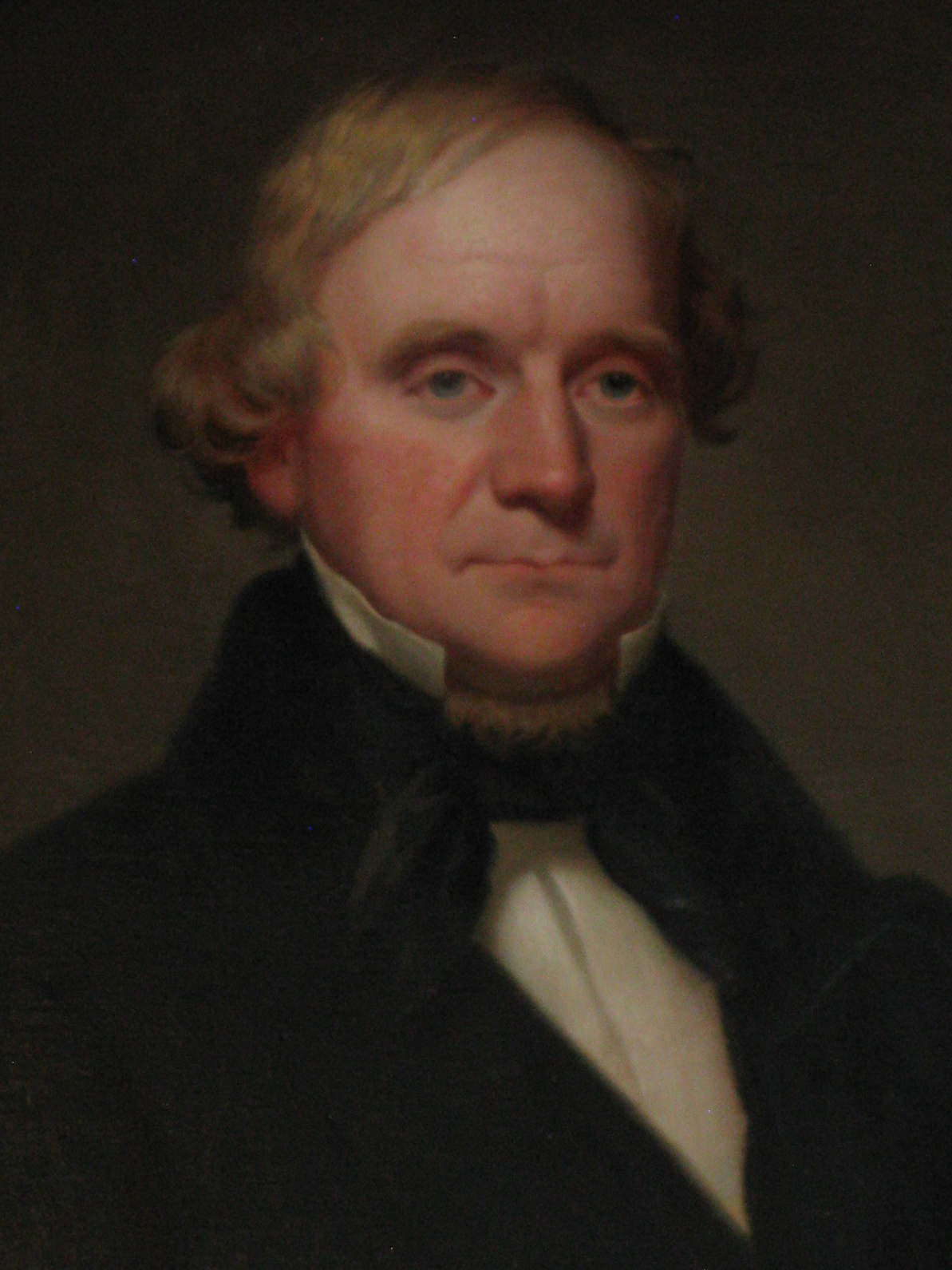
- French's Portrait in the Illinois State Capitol's Hall of Governors

9th Governor of Illinois
- In office December 9, 1846 – January 10, 1853
- Lieutenant: Joseph Wells; William McMurtry
- Preceded by: Thomas Ford
- Succeeded by: Joel Aldrich Matteson

Personal details
- Born: Augustus Chaflin French; August 2, 1808 Hill, New Hampshire, US
- Died: September 4, 1864 (aged 56) Lebanon, Illinois, US
- Party: Democratic
- Spouse: Lucy Southwick
- Occupation: Attorney; Professor of Law
- Profession: Politician

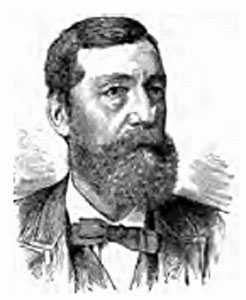
Sketch of French

Augustus Chaflin French (August 2, 1808 – September 4, 1864) was the ninth governor of the U.S. state of Illinois from 1846 until 1853. He is best known for his fiscal policies, which eliminated the state's debt by the end of his administration, and for the lack of scandals during his administration. His name also graces the Governor French Academy in Belleville, Illinois.

== Early life and political rise ==
French was born in Hill, New Hampshire, the son of Eunice (Dickerson) and Joseph French. His father died when he was a child, and he struggled to obtain an education, finally leaving Dartmouth College due to lack of funds. Studying at home, he was admitted to the bar in 1823. He then travelled to Albion, Illinois, but soon moved to Edgar Courthouse (later renamed Paris) in the newly established Edgar County, where he acquired a successful law practice. On his mother's death, he assumed responsibility for his younger siblings.

French entered politics in 1837, first serving a term in the Illinois legislature, then becoming the Receiver of Public Monies (i.e., the receiver of money paid to the U.S. government for land) at Palestine in Crawford County, Illinois, where he took up residence. In 1844 he was a presidential elector for James K. Polk (the winner in that election), and became popular in Illinois politics through his advocacy of a war with Mexico. French was nominated for governor by his party and won the election for governor, taking office in December 1846.

== Administration ==
French immediately pushed for the funding to retire the state's debt, an attitude that characterized his entire tenure in office. He saw many of the Mormons leave the state in February 1846 after their city charter at Nauvoo had been revoked the previous year. Two events significant to the growth of Chicago occurred during French's term of office: the Illinois and Michigan Canal was completed, and the Galena and Chicago Union Railroad was begun. The canal connected the Illinois River (and thus, the Mississippi River) with the Great Lakes, while the railroad connected Chicago with the lead mines in Galena, Illinois (it would be completed in 1853).

A new state constitution was adopted in 1848, and among its changes from the 1818 constitution were new provisions for the election and terms of office for the state governor. French was unanimously renominated for the office by his party, and easily won re-election. He continued his efforts to reduce the state's debt, and by the time he left office in 1853, the entire deficit had been eliminated.

== Later life ==
After his retirement from government, French would continue his public service as a bank commissioner appointed to that position by Joel Aldrich Matteson, his successor as governor. He then relocated to Lebanon in St. Clair County, Illinois, where he became a professor of law at McKendree College.

In 1858 he ran for State Superintendent of Public Instruction as the nominee of the Douglas wing of his party, but was defeated. He was a delegate to the unproductive Illinois Constitutional Convention of 1862, which became known as the "Copperhead Convention" for its anti-war stance during the Civil War.

Augustus French died on September 4, 1864 at 12:20 Post-Meridiem, due to Typhoid fever, and was buried in College Hill Cemetery.

== Bibliography ==
- The National Cyclopedia of American Biography, vol. XI, New York: James T. White & Company, 1901, pp. 46–47
- Bateman, Newton; Selby, Paul, eds. (1912), Historical Encyclopedia of Illinois, vol. I, Chicago: Munsell Publishing Company, pp. 176–77

Party political offices
Preceded by Thomas Ford	Democratic nominee for Governor of Illinois; 1846, 1848	Succeeded by Joel Aldrich Matteson
Political offices
Preceded by Thomas Ford	Governor of Illinois; 1846–1853	Succeeded by Joel Aldrich Matteson
