= William H. Davidson (Illinois politician) =

American politician

William H. Davidson was an American businessman and politician who was the acting Lieutenant Governor of Illinois from December 9, 1836, to December 7, 1838. Davidson, who had been serving as the senator from White County, Illinois, replaced Alexander M. Jenkins when Jenkins resigned the Lieutenant Governor's office to become president of the Illinois Central Railroad. In 1838, Davidson lost a reelection bid to Stinson H. Anderson.

== Death ==
Davidson later moved from Carmi, Illinois, to Louisville, Kentucky, where he ran a successful wholesale mercantile business until his death.

Political offices
Preceded by Alexander Jenkins	Lieutenant Governor of Illinois; 1836–1838	Succeeded by Stinson Anderson
