= Thomas Carlin =

Governor of Illinois from 1838 to 1842

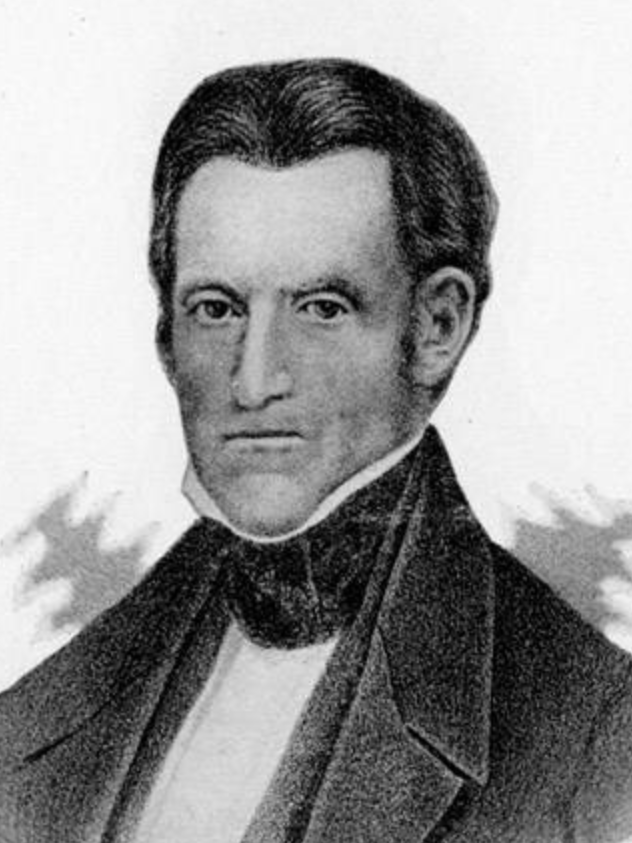

7th Governor of Illinois
- In office December 7, 1838 – December 8, 1842
- Lieutenant: Stinson Anderson
- Preceded by: Joseph Duncan
- Succeeded by: Thomas Ford

Member of the Illinois Senate
- In office 1824–1833

Member of the Illinois House of Representatives
- In office 1849–1849

Personal details
- Born: July 18, 1789 near Frankfort, Kentucky
- Died: February 14, 1852 (aged 62) Carrollton, Illinois, U.S.
- Party: Democratic
- Profession: Farmer, soldier, politician

Thomas Carlin (July 18, 1789 – February 14, 1852), a farmer, soldier and Jacksonian Democrat, was the seventh governor of Illinois (from 1838 to 1842) and also served in both houses of the Illinois General Assembly. He became the first Democrat nominated at an Illinois state convention, as well as the last Illinois governor who fought Native Americans. His gubernatorial term was noted for its inconsistency, as he had limited financial experience and the state suffered the aftereffects of the Panic of 1837 as well attempted to fund a costly Internal Improvements Act passed by the state legislature over his predecessor's objections.

== Early and family life ==
Born around 1789 near Frankfort, Kentucky to Thomas Carlin and his wife, the former Elizabeth Evans, Carlin moved with his family to Missouri Territory in 1803. His father died in 1810, leaving his widow to raise seven children (of whom Thomas was the eldest). In 1812, Carlin crossed the Missouri River to Illinois Territory to serve as a mounted ranger in the War of 1812 (including on future governor Ninian Edwards' Peoria expedition), then established a farm in what was then Madison County, Illinois.

In 1814, in Edwardsville, Carlin married Georgia-born Rebecca Huitt (August 27, 1799 - September 5, 1865). Their 13 children (seven of whom survived their father) included: Mary Ann (b. 1816); Eugene (b. 1817); William H. (b. 1818); Nathaniel (b. 1819); Elizabeth (1820–1823); Emily St. Aubert (b. 1821); John Massingill (b. 1829); Julia (b. 1830); Andrew Jackson (1832-after 1880), John Clark Carlin (1832–1865); Eugenia Carlin Woodward (1838–1886); and Thomas B. Carlin Jr. (1842–after 1880). In 1850, the Carlin family included his 90-year-old mother-in-law, three sons and two daughters as well as a 21 year old farm laborer, but no slaves.

== Career ==
Carlin built a log cabin across from the mouth of the Missouri River and operated a ferry until 1818, when Illinois became a state. Between 1819 and 1821, Carlin helped organize the frontier in what became Greene County, Illinois. Despite not learning to read nor write as a child, he helped lay out what became the county seat in 1821, Carrollton. Carlin was one of the first five commissioners (as was his brother-in-law John Huitt) and donated a large parcel of land for Carrollton, although he abstained from the vote designating it the county seat. Noted for his physical prowess and skill as a woodsman and rider as well as courage, Carlin served as Greene County's first sheriff, then twice won election to the Illinois Senate. He was instrumental in obtaining passage of a bill in January 1829 creating Macoupin County.

During the Black Hawk War, Carlin was captain of Greene County's militia companies. In 1834 he received an appointment as collector of federal funds at the land office at Quincy, Illinois, where Carlin would continue to live during his gubernatorial term. In 1838, the Democrats' first choice for governor, James W. Stephenson (of the then-boom town of Galena, Illinois) withdrew as candidate when his accounts were discovered delinquent, and the 1838 Illinois Democratic convention nominated Carlin as the party's candidate. As a Jacksonian Democrat as well as Indian fighter, Carlin supported the President's campaign against the national bank (which scholars now agree contributed to the Panic of 1837 which devastated Illinois' economy) and argued that strict compliance with state charter requirements would profit the young state. Carlin opposed monopolies and wanted the state to own and operate all railroads. During the 1838 gubernatorial election, his opponent, Whig Cyrus Edwards (of Alton, Illinois and youngest brother of Ninian Edwards) favored internal improvements.

In 1837, Illinois' legislature had approved moving the state capital from Vandalia to Springfield, despite the opposition of Governor Joseph Duncan, a former Jacksonian Democrat who had split with the President and won election as a Whig. The state government offices were constructed and the move occurred midway during Governor Carlin's term. Carlin's inaugural message blamed the Whig-controlled state bank and the Bank of Illinois at Shawneetown for Illinois' financial distress, which added to hardships encountered by frontier farmers. His predecessor, Governor Duncan, had urged Carlin to scrap the large Internal Improvements Act passed by the legislature in 1837, but Carlin tried to make a go of it, despite the large amount of money required and his lack of financial experience. He appointed former governor John Reynolds to try to sell bonds in Europe, since the Illinois and Michigan Canal from Chicago to the Illinois River (which crossed Greene County near Carrollton) required at least $1 million in financing. The two deals Reynolds arranged were on unfavorable terms to the state, and it lost more than $150,000. One of the parties to a contract, Wright and Company (London bankers) went bankrupt while Governor Carlin vacillated on approving the contract. Illinois ultimately sold bonds with a face value of $804,000 for $261,500, which proved a source of political controversy for many years, and which led to suspension of canal construction in 1842. Legislators also wanted the state to purchase an additional $3 million in bank stock, arguing that its dividends would fund the internal improvements, but Carlin warned it would not work, and the Senate Committee on Banks defeated the proposal. The substitute, a one-mill property tax to pay the bond interest, proved inadequate. Carlin begged Congress to donate more land to construct the Illinois and Michigan Canal, and also recommended that the state legislature repeal the charters of the state and Shawneetown banks, as occurred during the administration of his successor, Thomas Ford. Despite his federal land office background, Carlin refused to accept any funds from federal land sales, and also ordered that settlers must pay with gold or silver despite the liquidity crisis, which exacerbated the crisis. Another controversy which began during Carlin's term and erupted in his successor's term involved members of the Church of Jesus Christ of Latter-day Saints. Illinois politicians of both parties had welcomed Joseph Smith and fellow Latter-day Saints when they fled Missouri. Carlin signed a charter which gave Smith and his associates governmental power in Nauvoo, Illinois. Later, Carlin received Missouri warrants requesting Smith's extradition to Missouri, and Smith was arrested not long after leaving the governor's home.

After his term ended, Carlin returned to his farm between Maucoupin and Apple Creeks in Greene County, but continued politically active. In 1844 he ran for Congress, but lost to future U.S. Senator Stephen A. Douglas (who thus began his national political career). Two years later, Carlin threatened to run again against Douglas, but ultimately chose against it. In 1849, Carlin served an unexpired term in the Illinois House of Representatives when Jacob Fry resigned.

== Death and legacy ==
Carlin died in 1852 at home in Carrollton, Illinois, survived by his widow and seven of their children. His nephew William Passmore Carlin became a career U.S. Army officer, and Brigadier General of Illinois volunteers during the American Civil War, and later served as assistant director of the Freedman's Bureau in Tennessee, although his uncle was pro-slavery and Negro-hating, according to a long-lived Edwardsville judge.

The city of Carlinville, Illinois is named in his honor. Illinois erected a historical marker in Carrollton to honor the pioneer governor. The Carrollton Courthouse Square Historic District in Greene County is thus on land formerly owned by Governor Carlin, although only eight buildings (including a tavern, hotel, stores and a temperance hall) and a residence converted into the county historical society remain from those built during his lifetime (the historic courthouse dating from 1891).

Party political offices
Preceded by William Kinney	Democratic nominee for Governor of Illinois; 1838	Succeeded by Thomas Ford
Political offices
Preceded by Joseph Duncan	Governor of Illinois; 1838–1842	Succeeded by Thomas Ford
