= List of governors of Illinois =

Governor of Illinois
- Seal of the State of Illinois

- Flag of Illinois

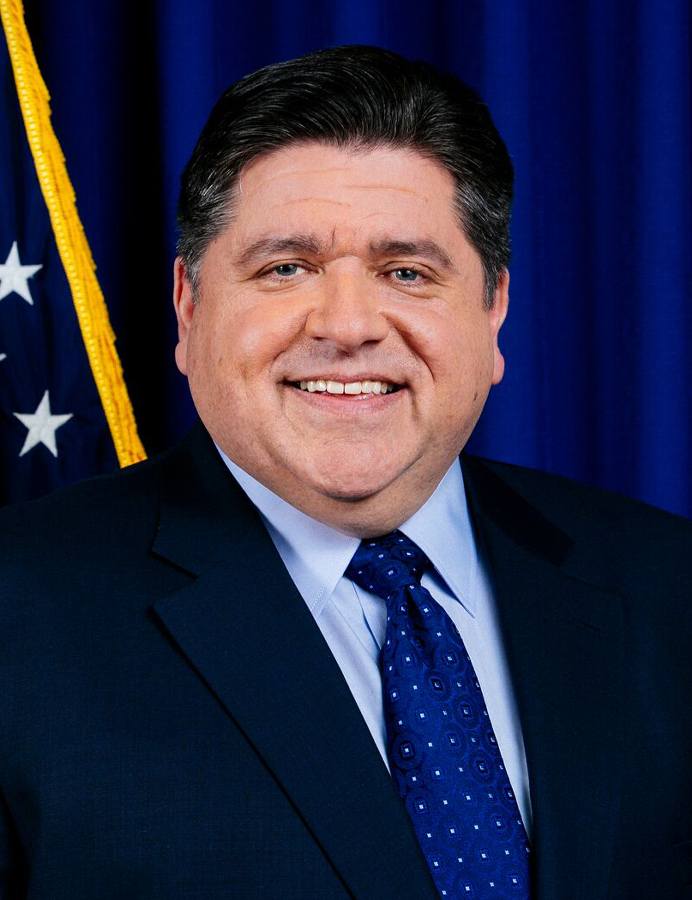
- Incumbent; JB Pritzker since January 14, 2019
- Residence: Illinois Governor's Mansion
- Term length: Four years, no term limits
- Inaugural holder: Shadrach Bond
- Formation: October 6, 1818
- Succession: Line of succession
- Deputy: Lieutenant Governor of Illinois
- Salary: $184,758 (2022)
- Website: gov.illinois.gov

The governor of Illinois is the head of government of the U.S. state of Illinois. The governor is the head of the executive branch of Illinois's state government and is charged with enforcing state laws. The governor has the power to either approve or veto bills passed by the Illinois Legislature, to convene the legislature, and to grant pardons, except in cases of impeachment. The governor is also the commander-in-chief of the state's military forces.

Since becoming a state in 1818, 43 people have served as governor of Illinois; before statehood, it had only one territorial governor, Ninian Edwards. The longest-serving governor was Jim Thompson, who was elected to four terms lasting 14 years, from 1977 to 1991. Only one governor, Richard J. Oglesby, has served multiple non-consecutive terms, having been elected in 1864, 1872, and 1884.

The current governor is JB Pritzker, who took office on January 14, 2019.

== List of governors ==
=== Territory of Illinois ===
Illinois Territory was formed on March 1, 1809, from Indiana Territory. It had only two governors appointed by the president of the United States before it became a state, and only one ever took office.

Governors of the Territory of Illinois
No.	Governor	Term in office (Note: The range given is from the date the governor was confirmed by the Senate, or appointed by the President during a Senate recess, to the date the governor left office.)	Appointed by
1	John Boyle (1774–1834)	March 7, 1809 – April 3, 1809 (28 days; resigned before taking office) (Note: Boyle was nominated on March 6, 1809, and confirmed by the Senate on March 7. However, he resigned on April 3, having never taken office.)	James Madison
2	Ninian Edwards (Note: Territorial Secretary Nathaniel Pope served as acting governor until Edwards arrived in Illinois in June 1809.) (1775–1833)	April 24, 1809 (Note: Edwards was appointed on April 24, 1809; nominated on June 16; and confirmed by the Senate on June 17. He took office on June 11. He was reappointed on July 7, 1812, during a Senate recess; reconfirmed on November 20, 1812; reappointed on November 20, 1815, during a Senate recess; and reconfirmed on January 9, 1816.) – October 6, 1818 (3453 days; statehood) (Note: Edwards served as governor until statehood, when he was elected to the United States Senate.)	James Madison

=== State of Illinois ===
Illinois was admitted to the Union on December 3, 1818, consisting of the southern portion of Illinois Territory; the remainder was assigned to Michigan Territory.

The first Illinois Constitution, ratified in 1818, provided that a governor be elected every 4 years for a term starting on the first Monday in the December following an election. The constitution of 1848 moved the start of the term to the second Monday in January starting in 1849, thus shortening the term won in the 1844 election to 2 years. Governors were not allowed to succeed themselves until the 1870 constitution, which removed this limit.

The office of lieutenant governor was created in the first constitution, to exercise the power of governor if that office becomes vacant. The 1848 constitution changed this to say the power "devolves" upon the lieutenant governor in case of a vacancy. The current constitution of 1970 made it so that, in the event of a vacancy, the lieutenant becomes governor, and the governor and lieutenant governor are now elected on the same ticket. If the governor feels seriously impeded in performing their job, they can inform the secretary of state and the next in the line of succession, who becomes acting governor until the governor can resume office.

Governors of the State of Illinois
No. (Note: Based on the official site labeling Bruce Rauner as the 42nd governor, it is assumed the official numbering includes repeat governors only once; subsequent terms are marked with their original number italicized.)	Governor	Term in office	Party	Election	Lt. Governor (Note: Lieutenant governors represented the same party as their governor unless noted.) (Note: When the lieutenant governor is serving as governor, the Illinois Blue Book considers the president pro tempore of the senate to be acting lieutenant governor. However, this only applies to acting lieutenant governors before 1883; after that, there are no acting lieutenant governors noted, and instead these are marked vacant. It is unknown why this changed; the constitution does not appear to have any relevant changes around that time.)
1	Shadrach Bond (1773–1832)	October 6, 1818 – December 5, 1822 (1522 days; term-limited) (Note: Under the 1818 constitution, governors were limited to no more than four years out of every term of eight years.)	Democratic- Republican	1818	Pierre Menard
2	Edward Coles (1786–1868)	December 5, 1822 – December 6, 1826 (1463 days; term-limited)	Independent	1822	Adolphus Hubbard
3	Ninian Edwards (1775–1833)	December 6, 1826 – December 6, 1830 (1462 days; term-limited)	Democratic- Republican (Note: Dubin labels Edward as a pro-Administration candidate; Kallenbach labels him as National Republican; and Sobel & Raimo and Glashan label him as Democratic-Republican.)	1826	William Kinney
4	John Reynolds (1788–1865)	December 6, 1830 – November 17, 1834 (1443 days; resigned) (Note: Reynolds resigned, having been elected to the United States House of Representatives.)	Democratic	1830	Zadok Casey (Note: Represented the Democratic Party) (resigned March 1, 1833)
4	John Reynolds (1788–1865)	December 6, 1830 – November 17, 1834 (1443 days; resigned)	Democratic	1830	William Lee D. Ewing (acting)
5	William Lee D. Ewing (1795–1846)	November 17, 1834 – December 3, 1834 (17 days; retired)	Democratic (Note: Kallenbach labels Ewing a National Republican and Glashan labels him a Democratic-Republican. However, Sobel & Raimo describe him as a "Jacksonian Democrat," which would be the opposition to those parties.)	Lieutenant governor acting	Vacant
6	Joseph Duncan (1794–1844)	December 3, 1834 – December 7, 1838 (1466 days; term-limited)	Whig	1834	Alexander M. Jenkins (resigned December 9, 1836)
6	Joseph Duncan (1794–1844)	December 3, 1834 – December 7, 1838 (1466 days; term-limited)	Whig	1834	William H. Davidson (acting)
7	Thomas Carlin (1789–1852)	December 7, 1838 – December 8, 1842 (1463 days; term-limited)	Democratic	1838	Stinson Anderson
8	Thomas Ford (1800–1850)	December 8, 1842 – December 9, 1846 (1463 days; term-limited)	Democratic	1842	John Moore
9	Augustus C. French (1808–1864)	December 9, 1846 – January 10, 1853 (2225 days; term-limited) (Note: Under the 1848 constitution, governors elected after 1848 were limited to no more than four years out of every term of eight years.)	Democratic	1846 (Note: The election schedule was shifted after this term, shortening it to two years.)	Joseph Wells
9	Augustus C. French (1808–1864)	December 9, 1846 – January 10, 1853 (2225 days; term-limited)	Democratic	1848	William McMurtry
10	Joel Aldrich Matteson (1808–1873)	January 10, 1853 – January 12, 1857 (1464 days; term-limited)	Democratic	1852	Gustav Koerner
11	William Henry Bissell (1811–1860)	January 12, 1857 – March 18, 1860 (1162 days; died in office)	Republican	1856	John Wood
12	John Wood (1798–1880)	March 18, 1860 – January 14, 1861 (303 days; retired)	Republican	Lieutenant governor acting	Thomas Marshall (acting)
13	Richard Yates Sr. (1815–1873)	January 14, 1861 – January 16, 1865 (1464 days; term-limited) (Note: Yates, being term-limited, had already been elected to the United States Senate when his term ended.)	Republican	1860	Francis Hoffmann
14	Richard J. Oglesby (1824–1899)	January 16, 1865 – January 11, 1869 (1457 days; term-limited)	Republican	1864	William Bross
15	John M. Palmer (1817–1900)	January 11, 1869 – January 13, 1873 (1464 days; term-limited) (Note: The term limit was removed in the 1870 constitution, but Palmer was first elected under the previous constitution; Sobel & Raimo write that this meant he was term-limited.)	Republican	1868	John Dougherty
14	Richard J. Oglesby (1824–1899)	January 13, 1873 – January 23, 1873 (11 days; resigned) (Note: Oglesby resigned, having been elected to the United States Senate.)	Republican	1872	John Lourie Beveridge
16	John Lourie Beveridge (1824–1910)	January 23, 1873 – January 8, 1877 (1447 days; retired)	Republican	Lieutenant governor acting	John Early (acting) (term ended January 8, 1875)
16	John Lourie Beveridge (1824–1910)	January 23, 1873 – January 8, 1877 (1447 days; retired)	Republican	Lieutenant governor acting	Archibald A. Glenn (acting)
17	Shelby M. Cullom (1829–1914)	January 8, 1877 – February 6, 1883 (2221 days; resigned) (Note: Cullom resigned, having been elected to the United States Senate.)	Republican	1876	Andrew Shuman
17	Shelby M. Cullom (1829–1914)	January 8, 1877 – February 6, 1883 (2221 days; resigned)	Republican	1880	John Marshall Hamilton
18	John Marshall Hamilton (1847–1905)	February 6, 1883 – January 30, 1885 (725 days; retired)	Republican	Lieutenant governor acting	William James Campbell (acting)
14	Richard J. Oglesby (1824–1899)	January 30, 1885 – January 14, 1889 (1446 days; retired)	Republican	1884	John C. Smith
19	Joseph W. Fifer (1840–1938)	January 14, 1889 – January 10, 1893 (1458 days; lost election)	Republican	1888	Lyman Beecher Ray
20	John Peter Altgeld (1847–1902)	January 10, 1893 – January 11, 1897 (1463 days; lost election)	Democratic	1892	Joseph B. Gill
21	John Riley Tanner (1844–1901)	January 11, 1897 – January 14, 1901 (1464 days; retired) (Note: Tanner instead ran unsuccessfully for the Republican nomination for the United States Senate.)	Republican	1896	William Northcott
22	Richard Yates Jr. (1860–1936)	January 14, 1901 – January 9, 1905 (1457 days; lost nomination)	Republican	1900	William Northcott
23	Charles S. Deneen (1863–1940)	January 9, 1905 – February 3, 1913 (2948 days; lost election)	Republican	1904	Lawrence Y. Sherman
23	Charles S. Deneen (1863–1940)	January 9, 1905 – February 3, 1913 (2948 days; lost election)	Republican	1908	John G. Oglesby
24	Edward Fitzsimmons Dunne (1853–1937)	February 3, 1913 – January 8, 1917 (1436 days; lost election)	Democratic	1912	Barratt O'Hara
25	Frank O. Lowden (1861–1943)	January 8, 1917 – January 10, 1921 (1464 days; retired)	Republican	1916	John G. Oglesby
26	Len Small (1862–1936)	January 10, 1921 – January 14, 1929 (2927 days; lost nomination)	Republican	1920	Fred E. Sterling
26	Len Small (1862–1936)	January 10, 1921 – January 14, 1929 (2927 days; lost nomination)	Republican	1924	Fred E. Sterling
27	Louis Lincoln Emmerson (1863–1941)	January 14, 1929 – January 9, 1933 (1457 days; retired)	Republican	1928	Fred E. Sterling
28	Henry Horner (1878–1940)	January 9, 1933 – October 6, 1940 (2828 days; died in office)	Democratic	1932	Thomas Donovan
28	Henry Horner (1878–1940)	January 9, 1933 – October 6, 1940 (2828 days; died in office)	Democratic	1936	John Henry Stelle
29	John Henry Stelle (1891–1962)	October 6, 1940 – January 13, 1941 (100 days; lost nomination) (Note: Stelle had already lost the Democratic nomination for governor when he succeeded Horner.)	Democratic	Lieutenant governor acting	Vacant
30	Dwight H. Green (1897–1958)	January 13, 1941 – January 10, 1949 (2920 days; lost election)	Republican	1940	Hugh W. Cross
30	Dwight H. Green (1897–1958)	January 13, 1941 – January 10, 1949 (2920 days; lost election)	Republican	1944	Hugh W. Cross
31	Adlai Stevenson II (1900–1965)	January 10, 1949 – January 12, 1953 (1464 days; retired) (Note: Stevenson instead ran unsuccessfully for President of the United States.)	Democratic	1948	Sherwood Dixon
32	William Stratton (1914–2001)	January 12, 1953 – January 9, 1961 (2920 days; lost election)	Republican	1952	John William Chapman
32	William Stratton (1914–2001)	January 12, 1953 – January 9, 1961 (2920 days; lost election)	Republican	1956	John William Chapman
33	Otto Kerner Jr. (1908–1976)	January 9, 1961 – May 20, 1968 (2689 days; resigned) (Note: Kerner resigned, having been confirmed to the United States Court of Appeals for the Seventh Circuit.)	Democratic	1960	Samuel Shapiro
33	Otto Kerner Jr. (1908–1976)	January 9, 1961 – May 20, 1968 (2689 days; resigned)	Democratic	1964	Samuel Shapiro
34	Samuel Shapiro (1907–1987)	May 20, 1968 – January 13, 1969 (239 days; lost election)	Democratic	Lieutenant governor acting	Vacant
35	Richard B. Ogilvie (1923–1988)	January 13, 1969 – January 8, 1973 (1457 days; lost election)	Republican	1968	Paul Simon
36	Dan Walker (1922–2015)	January 8, 1973 – January 10, 1977 (1464 days; lost nomination) (Note: Walker lost the Democratic nomination to Michael Howlett.)	Democratic	1972	Neil Hartigan
37	Jim Thompson (1936–2020)	January 10, 1977 – January 14, 1991 (5118 days; retired)	Republican	1976 (Note: The schedule for the 1970 constitution provided that the 1976 election would be for a two-year term, shifting the election schedule away from presidential election years.)	Dave O'Neal (resigned July 31, 1981)
37	Jim Thompson (1936–2020)	January 10, 1977 – January 14, 1991 (5118 days; retired)	Republican	1978	Dave O'Neal (resigned July 31, 1981)
37	Jim Thompson (1936–2020)	January 10, 1977 – January 14, 1991 (5118 days; retired)	Republican	1978	Vacant
37	Jim Thompson (1936–2020)	January 10, 1977 – January 14, 1991 (5118 days; retired)	Republican	1982	George Ryan
37	Jim Thompson (1936–2020)	January 10, 1977 – January 14, 1991 (5118 days; retired)	Republican	1986	George Ryan
38	Jim Edgar (1946–2025)	January 14, 1991 – January 11, 1999 (2920 days; retired)	Republican	1990	Bob Kustra (resigned July 1, 1998)
38	Jim Edgar (1946–2025)	January 14, 1991 – January 11, 1999 (2920 days; retired)	Republican	1994	Bob Kustra (resigned July 1, 1998)
38	Jim Edgar (1946–2025)	January 14, 1991 – January 11, 1999 (2920 days; retired)	Republican	1994	Vacant
39	George Ryan (1934–2025)	January 11, 1999 – January 13, 2003 (1464 days; retired)	Republican	1998	Corinne Wood
40	Rod Blagojevich (b. 1956)	January 13, 2003 – January 29, 2009 (2209 days; impeached and removed) (Note: Blagojevich was impeached and removed from office on charges of corruption.)	Democratic	2002	Pat Quinn
40	Rod Blagojevich (b. 1956)	January 13, 2003 – January 29, 2009 (2209 days; impeached and removed)	Democratic	2006	Pat Quinn
41	Pat Quinn (b. 1948)	January 29, 2009 – January 12, 2015 (2175 days; lost election)	Democratic	Succeeded from lieutenant governor	Vacant
41	Pat Quinn (b. 1948)	January 29, 2009 – January 12, 2015 (2175 days; lost election)	Democratic	2010	Sheila Simon
42	Bruce Rauner (b. 1956)	January 12, 2015 – January 14, 2019 (1464 days; lost election)	Republican	2014	Evelyn Sanguinetti
43	JB Pritzker (b. 1965)	January 14, 2019 – Incumbent (Note: Pritzker's second term began on January 9, 2023, and will expire on January 11, 2027; he was elected to a third term on November 3, 2026.) (in office 2870 days)	Democratic	2018	Juliana Stratton
43	JB Pritzker (b. 1965)	January 14, 2019 – Incumbent (in office 2870 days)	Democratic	2022	Juliana Stratton
43	JB Pritzker (b. 1965)	January 14, 2019 – Incumbent (in office 2870 days)	Democratic	2026	Christian Mitchell

== See also ==
- Gubernatorial lines of succession in the United States § Illinois
- Lieutenant Governor of Illinois
- List of Illinois state legislatures
- List of commandants of the Illinois Country

== Sources ==
- "Former Illinois Governors". National Governors Association.
- "Illinois Constitution". State Democracy Research Initiative. University of Wisconsin Law School.
- Dubin, Michael J. (2003). United States Gubernatorial Elections, 1776–1860: The Official Results by State and County. McFarland. ISBN 0-7864-1439-1 – via Internet Archive.
- Glashan, Roy R. (1979). American Governors and Gubernatorial Elections, 1775-1978. Meckler Books. ISBN 0-7201-1511-6 – via Internet Archive.
- Kallenbach, Joseph E.; Kallenbach, Jessamine S. (1977). American State Governors, 1776-1976. Oceana Publications. ISBN 978-0-379-00665-0 – via Internet Archive.
- McMullin, Thomas A.; Walker, David (1984). Biographical Directory of American Territorial Governors. Meckler Publishing. ISBN 0-930466-11-X – via Internet Archive.
- Mullaney, Marie Marmo (1994). Biographical Directory of the Governors of the United States, 1988–1994. Greenwood Publishing Group. ISBN 0-313-28312-5 – via Internet Archive.
- Sobel, Robert; Raimo, John (1978). Biographical Directory of the Governors of the United States, 1789-1978. Vol. 1. Meckler Books. ISBN 0-930466-01-2 – via Internet Archive.
- Thorpe, Francis Newton, ed. (1909). The Federal and State Constitutions, Colonial Charters, and Other Organic Laws of the States, Territories, and Colonies Now or Heretofore Forming the United States of America. Vol. 2. United States Government Publishing Office – via Internet Archive.
