= 1864 Illinois lieutenant gubernatorial election =

- November 8, 1864
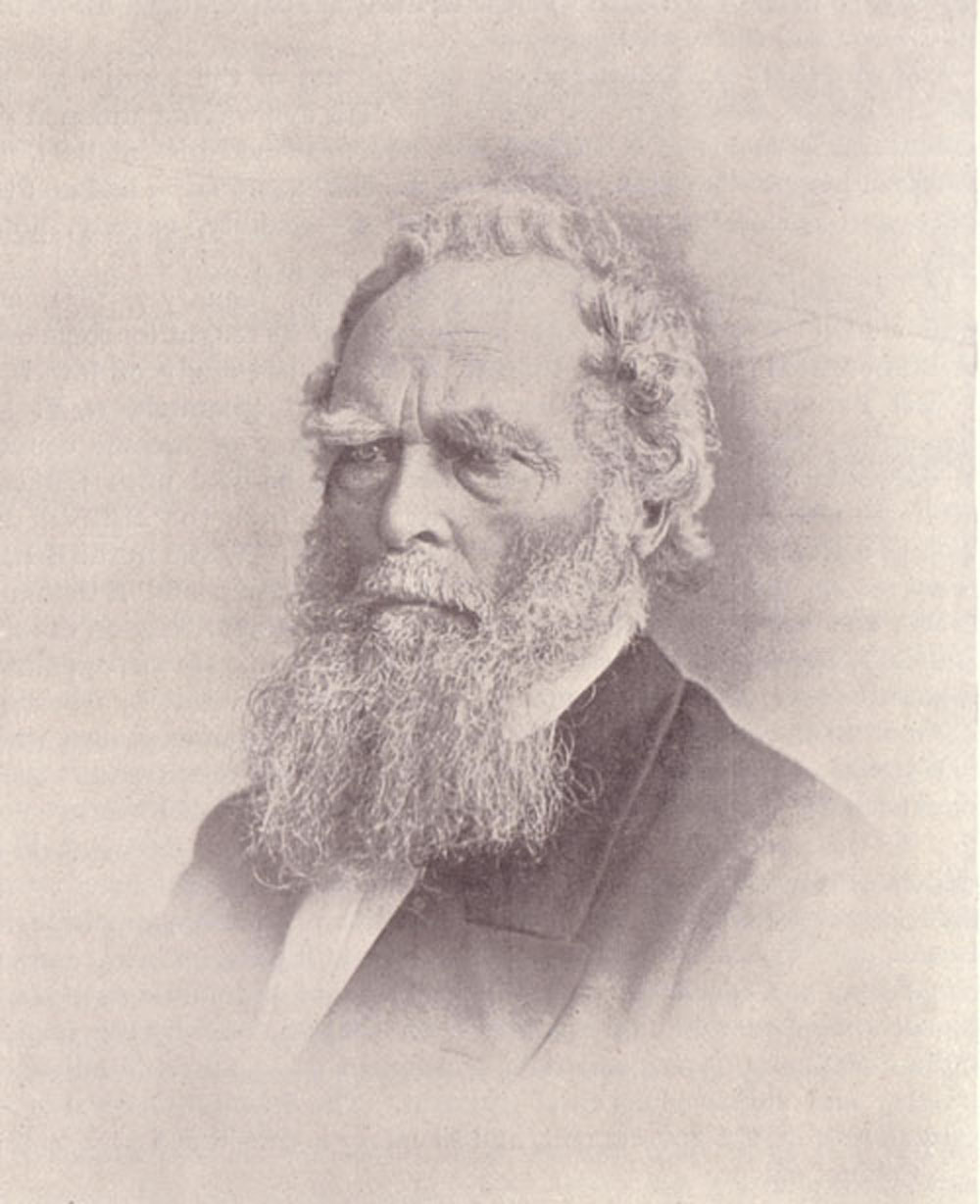

Nominee	William Bross	Solomon Corning Judd
Party	National Union	Democratic
Popular vote	188,842	158,244
Percentage	54.41%	45.59%
Lieutenant Governor before election
Francis Hoffmann
Republican
Elected Lieutenant Governor
William Bross
National Union

The 1864 Illinois lieutenant gubernatorial election was held on November 8, 1864, in order to elect the lieutenant governor of Illinois. National Union nominee William Bross defeated Democratic nominee Solomon Corning Judd.

== General election ==
The Illinois Union Party state convention nominated Bross for lieutenant governor on May 25, 1864. Bross won the general election by a margin of 30,598 votes against his opponent Democratic nominee Solomon Corning Judd, thereby retaining Republican control over the office of lieutenant governor. Bross was sworn in as the 16th lieutenant governor of Illinois on January 3, 1865.

=== Results ===
Illinois lieutenant gubernatorial election, 1864
Party	Candidate	Votes	%
National Union	William Bross	188,842	54.41
Democratic	Solomon Corning Judd	158,244	45.59
Total votes		347,086	100.00
National Union hold			

== See also ==
- 1864 Illinois gubernatorial election
