= 1860 Illinois lieutenant gubernatorial election =

- November 6, 1860
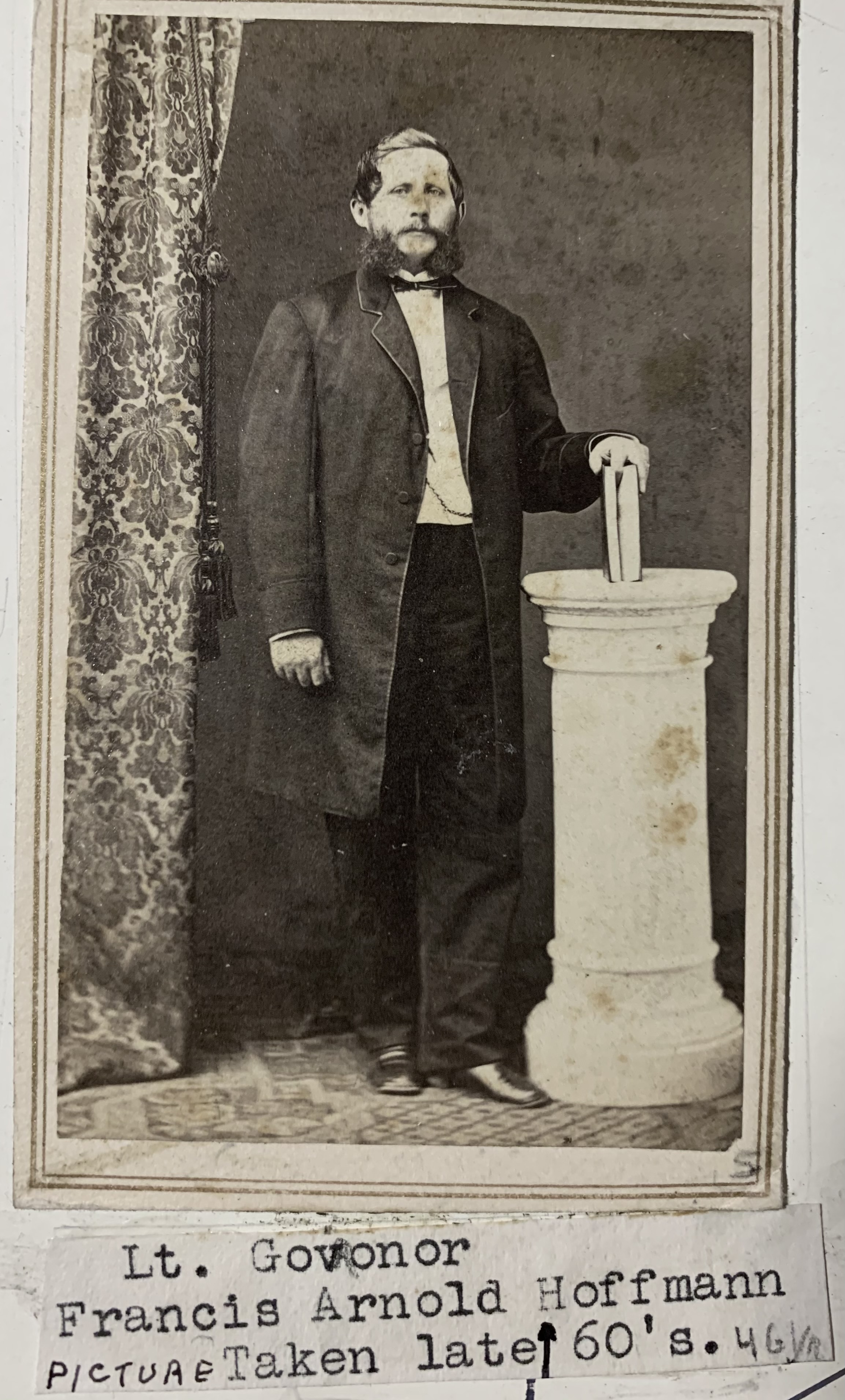

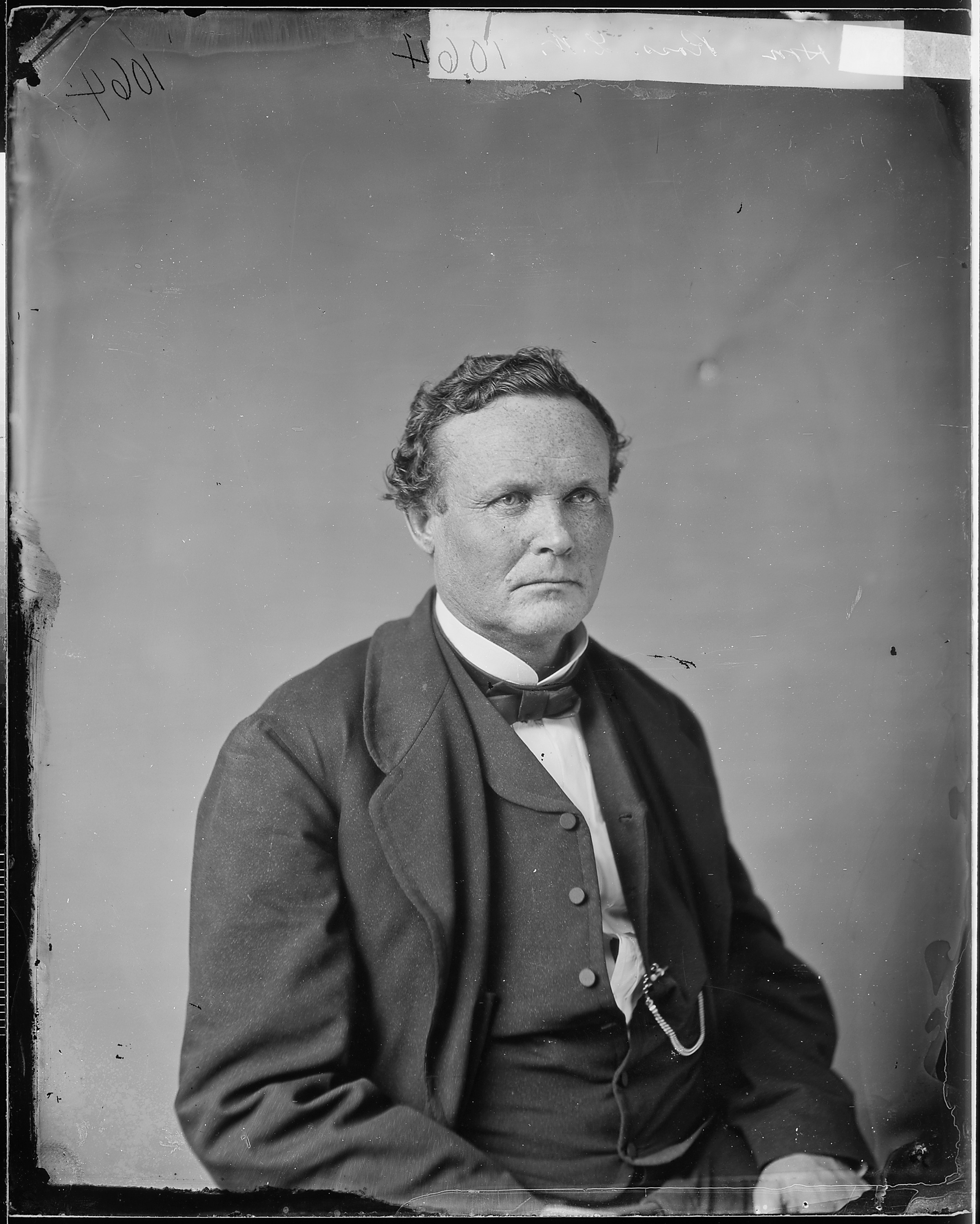
Nominee	Francis Hoffmann	Lewis Winans Ross
Party	Republican	Democratic
Popular vote	171,757	158,883
Percentage	51.10%	47.27%
Lieutenant Governor before election
Thomas Marshall
Democratic
Elected Lieutenant Governor
Francis Hoffmann
Republican

The 1860 Illinois lieutenant gubernatorial election was held on November 6, 1860, in order to elect the lieutenant governor of Illinois. Republican nominee Francis Hoffmann defeated Democratic nominee and former member of the Illinois House of Representatives Lewis Winans Ross, Independent Democrat Henry S. Blackburn and Constitutional Union nominee Thomas Snell.

== General election ==
On election day, November 6, 1860, Republican nominee Francis Hoffmann won the election by a margin of 12,874 votes against his foremost opponent Democratic nominee Lewis Winans Ross, thereby gaining Republican control over the office of lieutenant governor. Hoffmann was sworn in as the 15th lieutenant governor of Illinois on January 3, 1861.

=== Results ===
Illinois lieutenant gubernatorial election, 1860
Party	Candidate	Votes	%
Republican	Francis Hoffmann	171,757	51.10
Democratic	Lewis Winans Ross	158,883	47.27
Independent Democrat	Henry S. Blackburn	3,569	1.06
Constitutional Union	Thomas Snell	1,909	0.57
Total votes		336,118	100.00
Republican gain from Democratic			

== See also ==
- 1860 Illinois gubernatorial election
