= 1860 Illinois gubernatorial election =

- November 6, 1860
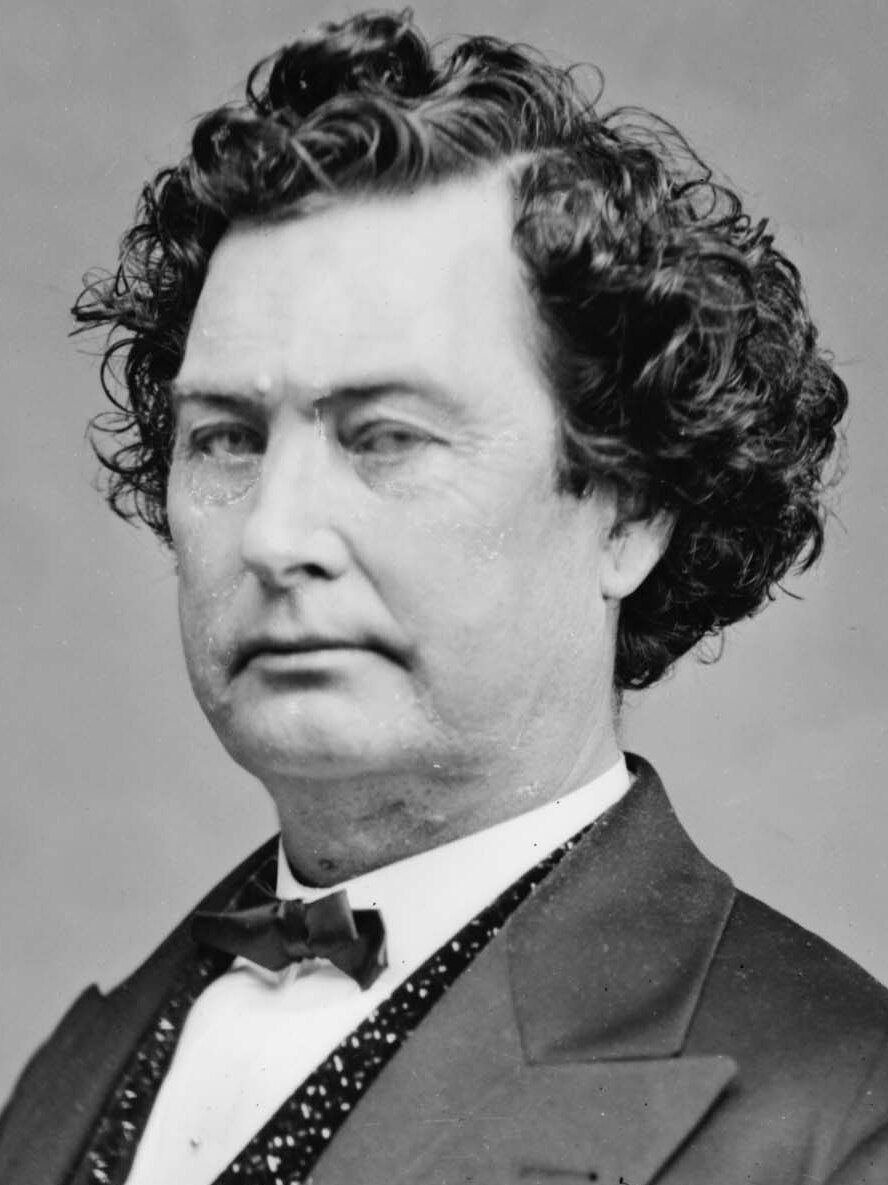

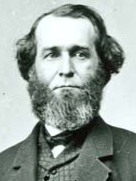
Nominee	Richard Yates	James C. Allen
Party	Republican	Democratic
Popular vote	172,196	159,253
Percentage	51.19%	47.34%
- County results Yates: 40–50% 50–60% 60–70% 70–80% 80–90% Allen: 40–50% 50–60% 60–70% 70–80% 80–90% 90–100% No Vote/Data
Governor before election
John Wood
Republican
Elected Governor
Richard Yates
Republican

The 1860 Illinois gubernatorial election was held on November 6, 1860. Republican governor William Henry Bissell died early in his term, and incumbent governor John Wood did not seek re-election. Republican Richard Yates defeated clerk of the U.S. House and former U.S. representative James C. Allen.

== General election ==
=== Candidates ===
- James C. Allen, clerk of the U.S. House and former U.S. representative from Palestine (Democratic)
- J. W. Chickering
- Thomas Hope
- John T. Stuart, former state senator and U.S. representative from Springfield (Constitutional Union)
- Richard Yates, former U.S. representative from Jacksonville (Republican)

=== Results ===
1860 gubernatorial election, Illinois
Party	Candidate	Votes	%	±%
Republican	Richard Yates	172,218	51.15%	+4.22%
Democratic	James C. Allen	159,293	47.34%	+2.35%
Independent	Thomas Hope	2,032	0.61%	N/A
Constitutional Union	John T. Stuart	1,685	0.48%	N/A
Independent	J. W. Chickering	150	0.34%	N/A
Write-in	Scattering	122	0.04%	N/A
Majority		12,925	3.85%	−6.77%
Turnout		336,500	100.00%	
Republican hold		Swing		

== See also ==
- 1860 Illinois lieutenant gubernatorial election
