= Thomas Marshall (Illinois politician) =

American politician

Thomas Alexander Marshall (4 November 1817 – 11 November 1873) was an American politician. In 1861 he served for a short time as Lieutenant Governor of Illinois.

== Life ==
Thomas Marshall graduated from Kenyon College in Ohio. Afterwards he studied law at Transylvania University in Lexington, Kentucky. After his admission to the bar he practiced as a lawyer. Later he moved to Charleston, Illinois where he became a banker. In addition he founded his own firm which he called T. A. Marshall Co. His party affiliation is uncertain because the sources are contradictory in this question. The political Graveyard states he was a Republican while other sources make him a Democrat. According to the Political Graveyard he was a delegate to the Republican National Convention in 1860, which nominated Abraham Lincoln for the Presidency.

In 1847 Marshall was a Delegate to the Illinois state constitutional convention and in the 1850s he was a member of the Illinois Senate where he advanced to the President. In March 1860 Governor William Henry Bissell died and his Lieutenant Governor John Wood followed him as Governor. In his function as President of the State Senate Marshall replaced Wood as acting Lieutenant Governor. It remains unclear if he took this position already in March 1860 or on 7 January 1861. His term ended on 14 January 1861 when his successor Francis Hoffmann was inaugurated. During the American Civil War Marshall was a Colonel in the Union Army. He died on 11. November 1873 in Charleston in Illinois.

Political offices
Preceded by John Wood	Lieutenant Governor of Illinois; 1861–1861	Succeeded by Francis Hoffmann
