= William Alexander Richardson =

American politician

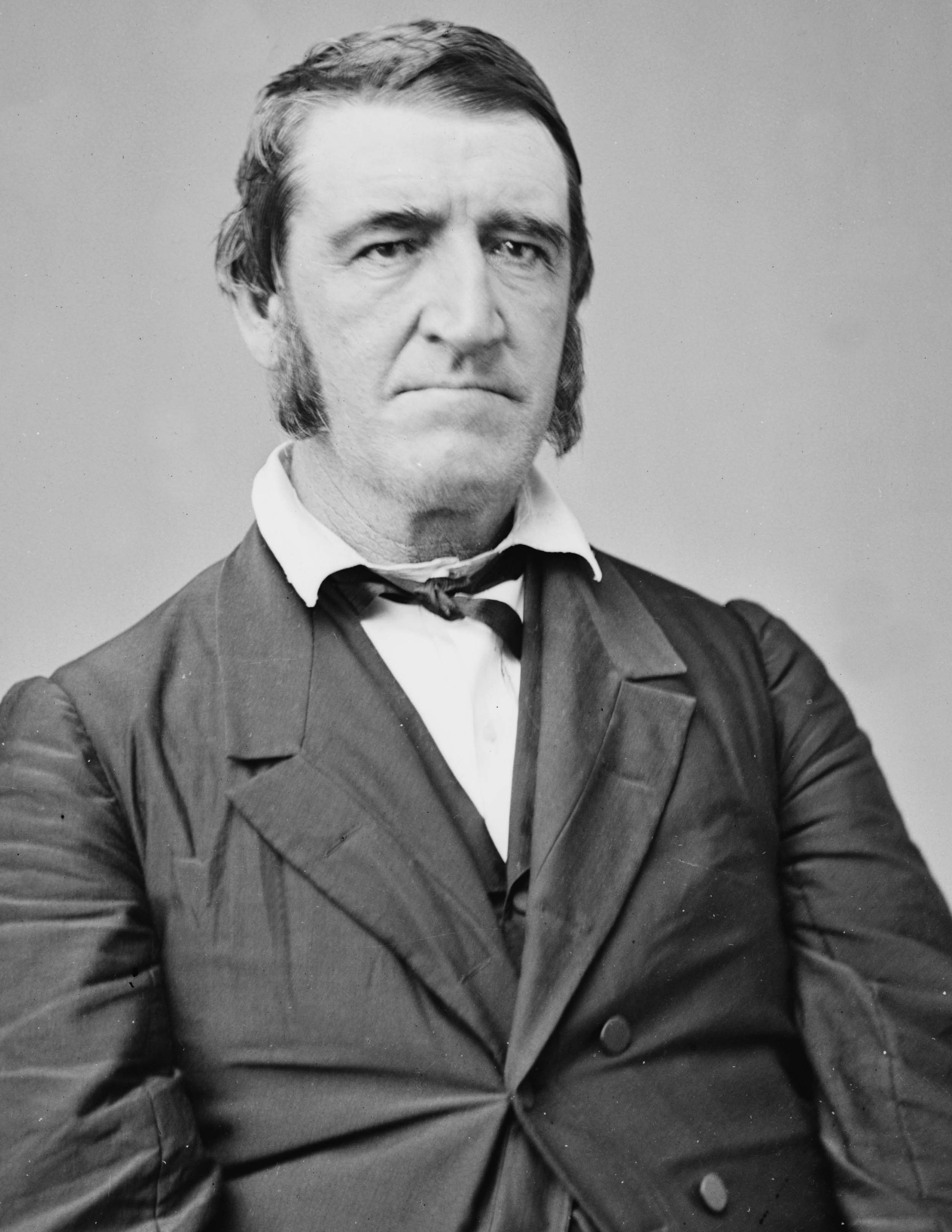
- Photograph c. 1855–1865

United States Senator from Illinois
- In office January 12, 1863 – March 3, 1865
- Preceded by: Orville H. Browning
- Succeeded by: Richard Yates

3rd Governor of Nebraska Territory
- In office January 12, 1858 – December 5, 1858
- President: James Buchanan
- Preceded by: Thomas B. Cuming
- Succeeded by: Julius Sterling Morton

Member of the U.S. House of Representatives from Illinois's 5th district
- In office March 4, 1861 – January 12, 1863
- Preceded by: Isaac N. Morris
- Succeeded by: Owen Lovejoy
- In office December 6, 1847 – August 25, 1856
- Preceded by: Stephen A. Douglas
- Succeeded by: Jacob C. Davis

12th Speaker of the Illinois House of Representatives
- In office December 5, 1842 – December 2, 1844
- Preceded by: Samuel Hackleton
- Succeeded by: Newton Cloud

Member of the Illinois Senate
- In office 1838-1842

Member of the Illinois House of Representatives
- In office 1836–1838; 1844–1846

Personal details
- Born: January 16, 1811 Lexington, Kentucky, US
- Died: December 27, 1875 (aged 64) Quincy, Illinois, US
- Party: Democratic
- Education: Centre College; Transylvania University
- Profession: Politician, Lawyer

Military service
- Branch/service: United States Army
- Rank: Major
- Battles/wars: Mexican–American War

William Alexander Richardson (January 16, 1811 – December 27, 1875) was a prominent Democratic politician from Illinois before and during the American Civil War. A protege of Stephen Douglas, Richardson was an ardent proponent of Jacksonian democracy, popular sovereignty, and strict constructionism. During the American Civil War, he switched from supporting the conflict to join the Copperhead wing of the Democratic party and bitterly criticize President Abraham Lincoln.

== Biography ==
=== Early life ===
Born near Lexington, Kentucky, Richardson came from a distinguished family. His maternal great-grandfather was a veteran of the American Revolutionary War participating in the Battle of Kings Mountain. His maternal grandfather fought in the War of 1812 and was killed in the Battle of Frenchtown. Richardson attended Transylvania University, and then proceeded to teach school and study law. He passed the bar exam in 1831 and started his practice in Shelbyville, Illinois. He served as an officer during the Black Hawk War whose soldiers remembered the "stern coarseness" of his leadership. He was an attorney for the state from 1834 to 1835, and was elected representative to the state house, serving from 1836 to 1838. During this term Richardson served alongside Stephen Douglas and Abraham Lincoln.

In 1837 he supported Lincoln in making Springfield the capital of Illinois, after the charter for Vandalia expired. Richardson was a supporter of President Andrew Jackson against the Second Bank of the United States. At the state level he supported a bill that would make bank directors and stockholders responsible for redemption notes that citizens had with the state. When Governor Joseph Duncan defended the Bank, Richardson and other Democrats introduced a resolution calling such claims "contrary to the assertions of the patriot and statesmen, General Jackson."

He was narrowly elected to the state senate in 1838 by only seven votes which almost led to a duel between Richardson and his opponent's campaign managers. He served to 1842 deciding against reelection. Richardson returned to the house again from 1844 to 1846, briefly serving as speaker of the lower house during his last term. He was a presidential elector in 1844 for successful Democratic nominee James K. Polk.

When the Mexican-American War broke out, Richardson raised a company of volunteers who then chose him as their captain in the U.S. Army. Initially under John J. Hardin's command, Richardson's regiment was later placed under General Zachary Taylor and by the end of the war Richardson was promoted to lieutenant-colonel. A strong defender of the war one of his first actions in congress was introducing an unsuccessful resolution calling the conflict "just and necessary". When his term of service expired in July 1847, he moved to Quincy, Illinois, and then was elected a U.S. congressman to the 30th Congress to fill Stephen A. Douglas's seat. He was then reelected to the 31st, 32nd, 33rd, and 34th Congresses for the same seat (1847 to 1856).

=== Congressional career ===
During his time in the House of Representatives, he was the chairman of the Committee on Territories (32nd–33rd Congresses). In congress, Richardson was a loyal protege of Stephen Douglas. During the crisis of 1850, Richardson supported all five parts of the Compromise of 1850. Afterword, when confronted in Illinois about the unpopular Fugitive Slave Act, Richardson said that while he personally opposed the law he supported it in order to ensure the admission of California. That year he won reelection defeating Orville H. Browning. During the crisis Richardson lamented the rise of secessionist sentiment:

There is a bad state of things here, and, as little as it is thought about, I fear this Union is in danger... It is appalling to hear gentlemen, Members of Congress sworn to support the Constitution, talk and talk earnestly for a dissolution of the Union.

After the 1852 Presidential election, Richardson took a leading role in the House in supporting Douglas's policies on the Kansas and Nebraska territories. His initial bill introduced on February 2, 1853, contained no mention of slavery and was supported by representatives Willard P. Hall and Joshua Giddings. When Douglas brought forth the Kansas–Nebraska Act, Richardson acted as his "manger" for the bill in the house and was instrumental in securing its passage. Richardson's role in the Kansas-Nebraska debate made him a national figure and in the 1854 House elections he was the only supporter of the Kansas-Nebraska Act to be reelected by a wider majority.

=== Candidacy for the Speakership ===
During the Speaker election after the midterm elections, Richardson was the choice for Speaker of the House of pro-Nebraska Democrats. On the first ballot Richardson won the most votes, with his closest opponent Lewis D. Campbell twenty votes behind, but fell short of the majority needed to be speaker. As balloting went on anti-Nebraska forces began consolidate around Nathaniel P. Banks of the American(Know Nothing) party. On January 10, 1856, Southern Know Nothings in an attempt to embarrass Richardson and stall for time sent the leading candidates (Richardson, Banks, and Henry Mills Fuller) a questionnaire on the issues of slavery in the District of Columbia and the territories, the Fugitive Slave Law, nativism, and racial equality. Richardson responded that the Constitution and the Fugitive slave act applied to the territories. While "hedging" on the question of constitutionality of the Wilmot Proviso, he also asserted that the constitution did not carry slavery into the territories. He opposed the abolition of slavery in the District, asserted the superiority of Whites over Blacks, and condemned nativism. Richardson's stance on the Wilmot Proviso undermined his position with Southern Democrats and three South Carolina reps abandoned him on the next ballot which was the 108th. Under pressure from President Franklin Pierce for a resolution to the stalemate in the house, Democrats replaced Richardson with James Lawrence Orr. Ultimately Banks was elected as speaker.

=== Gubernatorial election ===
Richardson was the Democratic nominee for governor in the 1856 Illinois gubernatorial election. He resigned in August 1856 to run for Governor of Illinois, narrowly losing to fellow representative, and first nominee of the newly established Republican Party, William H. Bissell. Richardson carried most of south Illinois while Bissell won most of north Illinois. Bissell won by 4,697 votes, a margin of just under 2%.

=== Territorial Governor ===
After being defeated, Richardson was appointed by President James Buchanan as the Governor of the Nebraska Territory for most of 1858. Richardson resigned near the end of the year, remaining loyal to his political mentor, Stephen A. Douglas.

He was a delegate to 1860 Democratic National Convention from Illinois. He then came back to Washington D.C. as a member of the 37th Congress in 1861. In 1863, he was elected to fill Stephen Douglas's old seat in the United States Senate, defeating incumbent Republican Orville Browning. He was not renominated in 1865 and spent the rest of his life engaged in newspaper work.

He died on December 27, 1875, in Quincy, Illinois, where he is buried.

Richardson County, Nebraska, is named after him.

== Sources ==
1. "Richardson, William Alexander". The Political Graveyard.
2. "Richardson, William Alexander". Biographical Directory of the United States Congress.

Party political offices
Preceded by Joel Aldrich Matteson	Democratic nominee for Governor of Illinois; 1856	Succeeded by James C. Allen
U.S. House of Representatives
Preceded by Stephen A. Douglas	Member of the U.S. House of Representatives from Illinois's 5th congressional district 1847–1856	Succeeded by Jacob C. Davis
Political offices
Preceded by Mark W. Izard; Territorial Governor; Thomas B. Cuming; Acting Territorial Governor	Territorial Governor of Nebraska; January 12, 1858 – December 5, 1858	Succeeded by J. Sterling Morton; Acting Territorial Governor; Samuel W. Black; Territorial Governor
U.S. House of Representatives
Preceded by Isaac N. Morris	Member of the U.S. House of Representatives from Illinois's 5th congressional district 1861–1863	Succeeded by Owen Lovejoy
U.S. Senate
Preceded by Orville H. Browning	U.S. senator (Class 2) from Illinois; January 12, 1863 – March 3, 1865; Served alongside: Lyman Trumbull	Succeeded by Richard Yates
