= 1864 Illinois gubernatorial election =

- November 1864
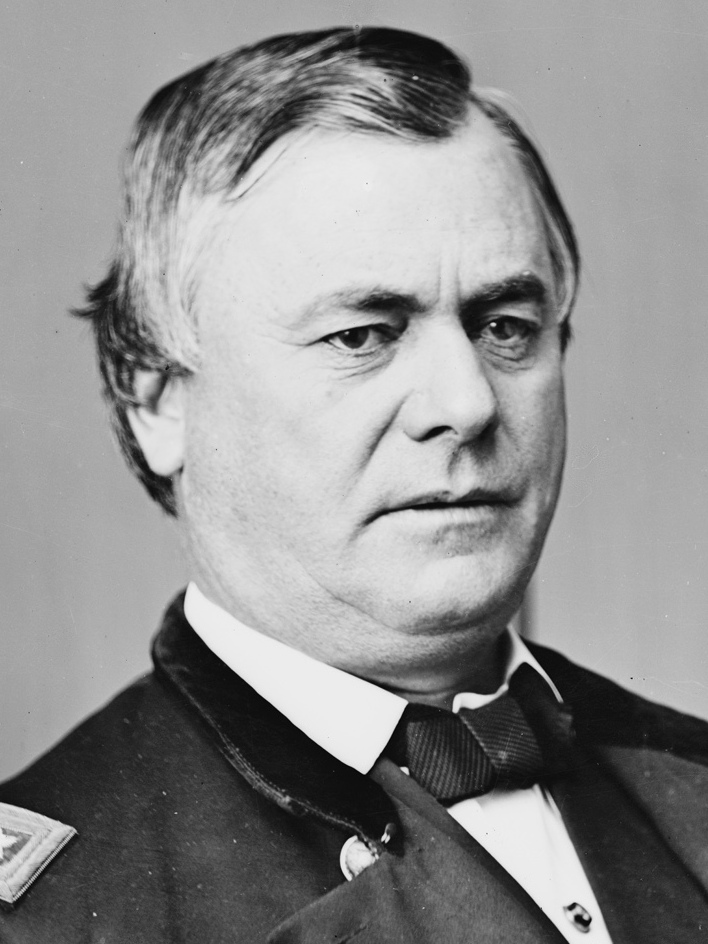

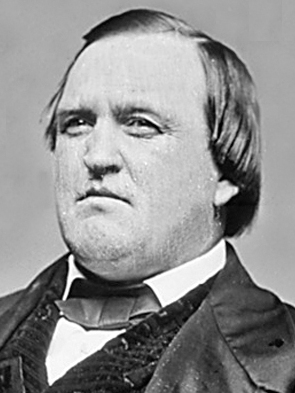
Nominee	Richard J. Oglesby	James Carroll Robinson
Party	National Union	Democratic
Popular vote	190,376	158,711
Percentage	54.54%	45.46%
- County results Oglesby: 50–60% 60–70% 70–80% Robinson: 50–60% 60–70% 70–80%
Governor before election
Richard Yates
Republican
Elected Governor
Richard J. Oglesby
National Union

The 1864 Illinois gubernatorial election was the thirteenth election for this office and took place during the American Civil War. Republican governor Richard Yates did not run for re-election, but was instead elected to serve in the United States Senate. U.S. Army major general Richard J. Oglesby resigned his commission to run as the National Union nominee, and he defeated U.S. representative James Carroll Robinson.

== General election ==
=== Candidates ===
- Richard J. Oglesby, U.S. Army major general and former state senator from Decatur (National Union)
- James Carroll Robinson, U.S. representative from Marshall (Democratic)

=== Results ===
1864 Illinois gubernatorial election
Party	Candidate	Votes	%	±%
National Union	Richard J. Oglesby	190,376	54.54	+3.39
Democratic	James Carroll Robinson	158,711	45.46	−1.88
Majority		31,665	9.08	+5.23
Turnout		349,087		
National Union hold		Swing		

== See also ==
- 1864 Illinois lieutenant gubernatorial election
