= Richard Yates Sr. =

Governor of Illinois from 1861 to 1865

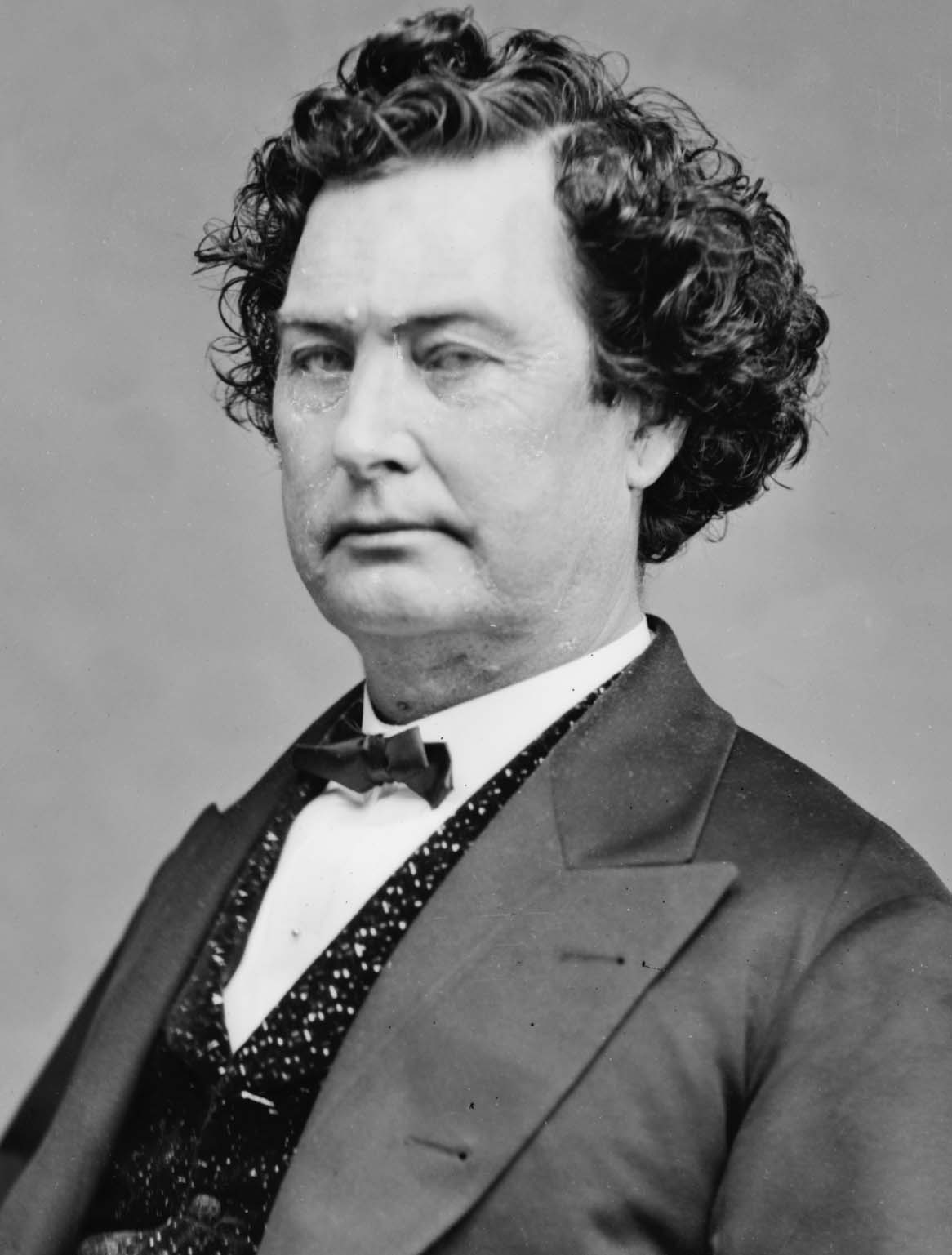
- Yates c. 1860–73

United States Senator from Illinois
- In office March 4, 1865 – March 3, 1871
- Preceded by: William A. Richardson
- Succeeded by: John A. Logan

13th Governor of Illinois
- In office January 14, 1861 – January 16, 1865
- Lieutenant: Francis Hoffmann
- Preceded by: John Wood
- Succeeded by: Richard J. Oglesby

Member of the U.S. House of Representatives from Illinois
- In office March 4, 1851 – March 3, 1855
- Preceded by: Thomas L. Harris
- Succeeded by: Thomas L. Harris
- Constituency: 7th district (1851–53); 6th district (1853–55)

Member of the Illinois House of Representatives
- In office 1842–1845; 1848–1849

Personal details
- Born: January 18, 1815 Warsaw, Kentucky, U.S.
- Died: November 27, 1873 (aged 58) St. Louis, Missouri, U.S.
- Party: Whig (until 1854); Republican (after 1854)
- Children: Richard Yates Jr.
- Education: Illinois College; Transylvania University
- Profession: Politician

Richard Yates Sr. (January 18, 1815 – November 27, 1873) was an American attorney and politician who served as the 13th governor of Illinois from 1861 to 1865 during the American Civil War. He also represented the state in the United States House of Representatives from 1851 to 1855 and the United States Senate from 1865 to 1871.

Yates is considered one of the most effective war governors and was nicknamed the "Soldiers' Friend". He took energetic measures to secure Cairo, Illinois, and St. Louis, Missouri, against rebel attack. He helped organize the Illinois contingent of Union soldiers and commissioned Ulysses S. Grant, among others, as a colonel for an Illinois regiment. He supported the Emancipation Proclamation. As a senator, he supported the impeachment and removal of President Andrew Johnson from office.

== Early life ==
Yates was born in a log cabin in Warsaw, Kentucky. His family was of English descent and moved to Illinois in 1831. He studied at Miami University and Georgetown College and graduated from Illinois College in Jacksonville, Illinois, in 1835. He then studied law at Transylvania University in Lexington, Kentucky. He was admitted to the bar in 1837 and commenced practice in Jacksonville.

Yates served as a member of the Illinois House of Representatives from 1842 to 1845 and 1848 to 1849. In 1850, he was elected as a Whig to the United States House of Representatives, where he was the youngest member of the Thirty-second Congress. He was reelected to Congress in 1852. During Yates' second term in Congress, the repeal of the Missouri Compromise reignited the anti-slavery controversy. He opposed the repeal, which opened the possibility of slavery expanding into Kansas, and became identified with the new Republican Party. Illinois Democrats redrew the boundaries of his district to favor their candidate, and Yates narrowly lost his bid for a third term in Congress.

Yates then worked for a time as president of a railroad company. Remaining politically engaged, he campaigned on behalf of Republican presidential candidate John C. Frémont in the 1856 election. He was known as an excellent orator. He had a weakness for whiskey, though at times he strove to exercise temperance. In later years, he was often conspicuously drunk, even at public functions. By 1867 he had "resolve[d] to quit drink altogether" but was unable to persist in this resolution.

== Governorship ==
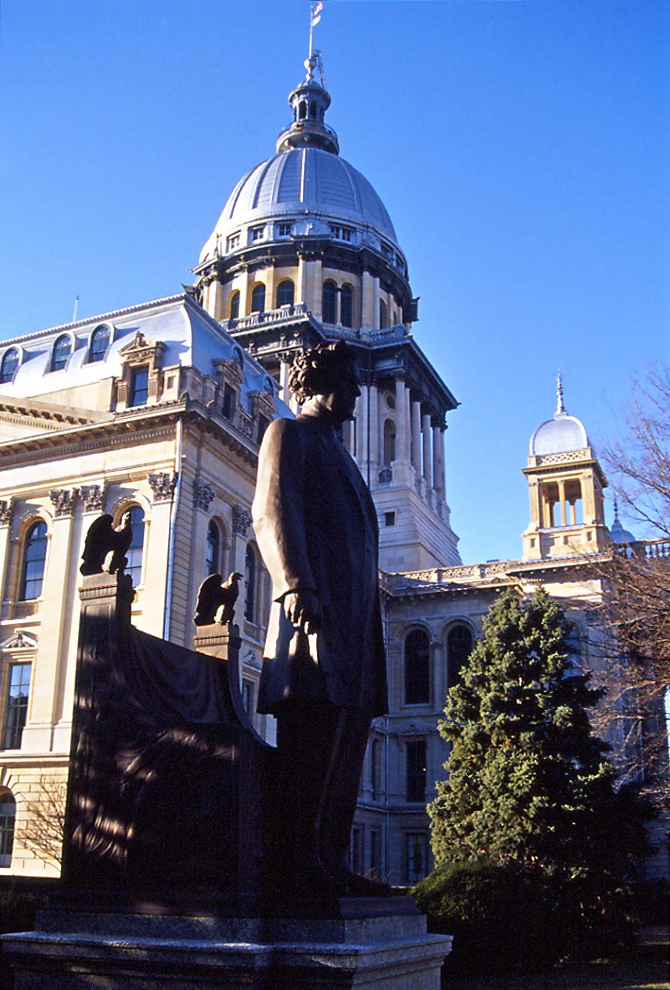
Statue by Polasek outside the Illinois State Capitol

In 1860 he was elected governor as a Republican; he and Abraham Lincoln, with whom he was friendly, supported each other's campaigns in Illinois. Yates's inaugural address denied that states had any right to secede from the Union and declared that "a claim so presumptuous and absurd could never be acquiesced in"; he also predicted that the Union would "in the end, be stronger and richer and more glorious, renowned and free, than it has ever been heretofore, by the necessary reaction of the crisis through which [they were] passing."

Governor Yates continued to be an outspoken opponent of slavery, and at the opening of the Civil War was very active in raising volunteers. He convened the legislature in extra session on April 12, 1861, the day after the attack on Fort Sumter, and took military possession of Cairo, garrisoning it with regular troops. Illinois banks made $1,000,000 available to Yates to equip the new Illinois troops raised in response to Lincoln's call. At Yates's suggestion, Lincoln authorized Illinois troops to protect the federal arsenal in St. Louis.

In Governor Yates's office, General Ulysses S. Grant received his first distinct recognition as a soldier in the Civil War, being appointed by Yates as mustering officer for the state, and afterward colonel of the 21st Illinois regiment. Yates would also secure military commissions for John A. Logan, John A. McClernand, and John M. Palmer (all prominent Democrats). Lincoln disregarded a hint from Yates that he would accept a commission as brigadier general on the grounds that Yates was too important as a loyal governor. After the Battle of Shiloh, Yates personally took hospital supplies to the succor of the wounded from his state, as did the wartime governors of Wisconsin (Salomon) and Indiana (Morton). Such humanitarian gestures cemented Yates's popularity, and the governor enjoyed the nickname of the "Soldiers' Friend". In September 1862, Yates attended the Loyal War Governors' Conference in Altoona, Pennsylvania, which ultimately gave Abraham Lincoln support for his Emancipation Proclamation.

During the Civil War, Yates benefited from his relations with Lincoln to bring significant federal financial resources to the State of Illinois and Chicago in particular. Chicago became the location for the largest prisoner of war encampment, Camp Douglas, which had been erected on the former estate of Lincoln's political opponent, the late Senator Stephen A. Douglas (similarly, the estate of Confederate general Robert E. Lee in Arlington, Virginia was taken over by the government for use as a military cemetery). During this period, Yates enlisted the services of former Chicago Mayor James Hutchinson Woodworth, a Republican with strong anti-slavery views similar to those of Yates, to oversee the disbursement and management of the federal funds received.

In his 1863 annual message, Yates denounced the talk among some secession sympathizers that the Union might be reconstructed to the exclusion of New England.

After the Emancipation Proclamation, the Democratic-dominated Illinois legislature proved increasingly uncooperative. Yates, fearing that the Democrats had been infiltrated by the pro-secession Knights of the Golden Circle, dissolved the Illinois legislature on June 10, 1863, declaring that "the past history of the Assembly hold[s] out no reasonable hope of beneficial results to the citizens of the State, or the army in the field, from its further continuance".

== Senatorial and later career ==
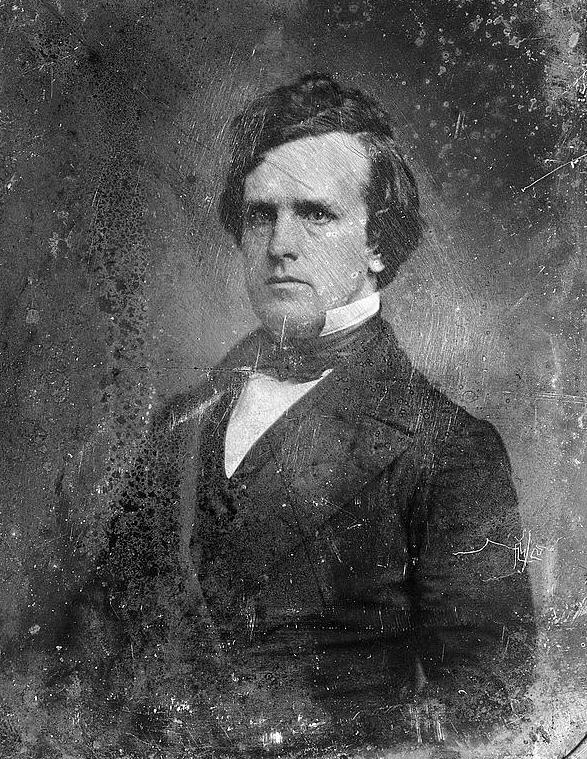
Richard Yates

After his service as governor ended, Yates was elected as a Republican to the United States Senate and served from March 4, 1865, to March 3, 1871. While in the Senate, Yates was Chairman of the Committee on Revolutionary Claims (Thirty-ninth and Forty-first Congresses) and Chairman of the Committee on Territories (Fortieth Congress). He was identified as an associate and "disciple" of Charles Sumner, the Radical senator from Massachusetts. During the impeachment proceedings against Andrew Johnson, Yates spoke in favor of convicting the president, whom he described as a "most pestilent disturber of public peace ... who, through murder succeeded to the chief command and seeks to betray us to the enemy."

Yates did not seek reelection to the Senate. After leaving the Senate, he was appointed by President Grant as a United States commissioner to inspect a land subsidy railroad. He died suddenly in St. Louis, Missouri on November 27, 1873. He is buried in Diamond Grove Cemetery, Jacksonville, Illinois.

== Legacy ==
In 1923 a statue of Yates by Albin Polasek was erected on the Illinois State Capitol grounds.

His son, Richard Yates Jr., was also active in Illinois politics, and also became governor of Illinois.

== Bibliography ==
- Bohn, Roger E. (2011). "Richard Yates: An Appraisal of his Value as the Civil War Governor of Illinois". Journal of the Illinois State Historical Society. 104 (1/2): 17–37. doi:10.2307/41201301. JSTOR 41201301. S2CID 140963870.
- Cole, Arthur Charles (1919). The Era of the Civil War 1848–1870. Volume 3 of the Centennial History of Illinois. The standard scholarly history.
- Hicken, Victor (1991). Illinois in the Civil War. University of Illinois Press. ISBN 0-252-06165-9.
- Portrait and Biographical Album of Champaign County, Illinois, Chapman Brothers, Chicago, 1887 – online as part of Illinois History, an ILGenWeb project
- Reavis, L. U. (February 7, 1881). The Life and Public Services of Richard Yates, the War Governor of Illinois: A Lecture Delivered in the Hall of the House of Representatives, Springfield, Illinois, Tuesday Evening, March 1st, 1881. J.H. Chambers & Company – via Google Books.

Party political offices
Preceded by William Henry Bissell	Republican nominee for Governor of Illinois; 1860	Succeeded by Richard J. Oglesby
Political offices
Preceded by John Wood	Governor of Illinois; 1861–1865	Succeeded by Richard J. Oglesby
U.S. Senate
Preceded by William A. Richardson	U.S. senator (Class 2) from Illinois; 1865–1871; Served alongside: Lyman Trumbull	Succeeded by John A. Logan
U.S. House of Representatives
Preceded by Thompson Campbell	Member of the U.S. House of Representatives from Illinois's 6th congressional district March 4, 1853 – March 3, 1855	Succeeded by Thomas L. Harris
Preceded by Thomas L. Harris	Member of the U.S. House of Representatives from Illinois's 7th congressional district March 4, 1851 – March 3, 1853	Succeeded by James C. Allen
