= Richard J. Oglesby =

Illinois politician and Union Army general (1824–1899)

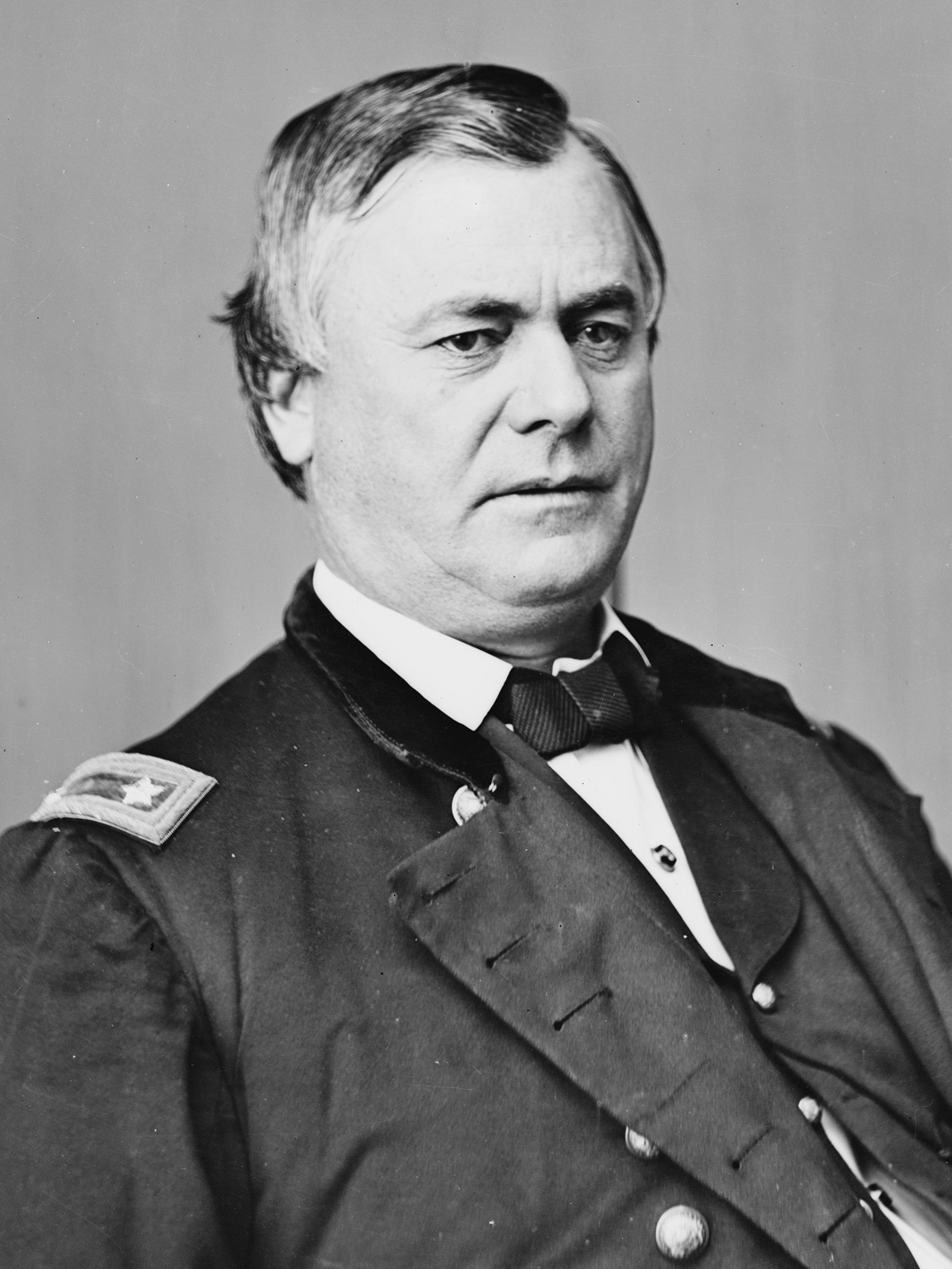
- Oglesby c. 1860s

14th Governor of Illinois
- In office January 16, 1865 – January 11, 1869
- Lieutenant: William Bross
- Preceded by: Richard Yates
- Succeeded by: John M. Palmer
- In office January 13, 1873 – January 23, 1873
- Lieutenant: John Lourie Beveridge
- Preceded by: John M. Palmer
- Succeeded by: John Lourie Beveridge
- In office January 30, 1885 – January 14, 1889
- Lieutenant: John Smith
- Preceded by: John Marshall Hamilton
- Succeeded by: Joseph W. Fifer

United States Senator from Illinois
- In office March 4, 1873 – March 3, 1879
- Preceded by: Lyman Trumbull
- Succeeded by: John A. Logan

Member of the Illinois Senate
- In office 1860

Personal details
- Born: Richard James Oglesby; July 25, 1824 Oldham County, Kentucky, U.S.
- Died: April 24, 1899 (aged 74) Elkhart, Illinois, U.S.
- Party: Republican
- Education: University of Louisville

Military service
- Allegiance: United States
- Branch/service: United States Army; Union Army
- Years of service: 1846–1847; 1861–1864
- Rank: Major General
- Battles/wars: Mexican–American War; American Civil War

Richard James Oglesby (July 25, 1824 – April 24, 1899) was an American military officer and Republican politician from Illinois. He served three non-consecutive terms as governor of Illinois (from 1865 to 1869, for ten days in 1873, and from 1885 to 1889) and as a United States senator from Illinois (from 1873 to 1879). Earlier he was a member of the Illinois Senate, elected in 1860. The town of Oglesby, Illinois, is named in his honor, as is an elementary school situated in the Auburn Gresham neighborhood of Chicago's south side.

He served in the United States Army during the Mexican–American War of 1846–47, and after the war became a prospector during the California Gold Rush and was elected to the Illinois General Assembly. During the American Civil War, Oglesby volunteered for the Union Army and rose to the rank of major general, serving in the Western Theater; he left the army when he was elected governor of Illinois in 1864.

== Early years ==
Oglesby was born in Floydsburg, Oldham County, Kentucky. He was orphaned and moved to live with his uncle in Decatur, Illinois in 1836, where he worked as a farmhand and carpenter.

== Mexican–American War ==
With the outbreak of the Mexican–American War, he enlisted as a 1st Lieutenant in Company C, 4th Illinois Volunteer Infantry Regiment taking part in the battles of Veracruz and Cerro Gordo "where his regiment almost captured Mexican President General Santa Anna, but they had to settle for his cork leg, carriage and $20,000 in gold".

He might have participated in what may have been the first baseball game ever played outside the U.S., at the end of April 1847, a few days after the Battle of Cerro Gordo, "with the wooden leg captured (by the Fourth Illinois regiment) from General Santa Anna".

He was mustered out of the volunteer service in May 1847.

== Entry into politics ==
He studied at Louisville Law School in 1848, but traveled to California for the gold rush in 1849, where he tried his hand at gold mining. After two years of traveling in Europe, he returned to Illinois in 1851 and joined the Republican Party at its formation. Oglesby ran unsuccessfully for the U.S. Congress in 1858 but was elected to the Illinois Senate in 1860. In 1859, Oglesby married Decatur native Anna White. They had four children: Richard, Elizabeth, Robert, and Olive. Oglesby was one of the earliest advocates for Abraham Lincoln's nomination as the 1860 presidential candidate of the Republican Party; it may have been he who applied the moniker "Railsplitter" to Lincoln.

== Civil War ==
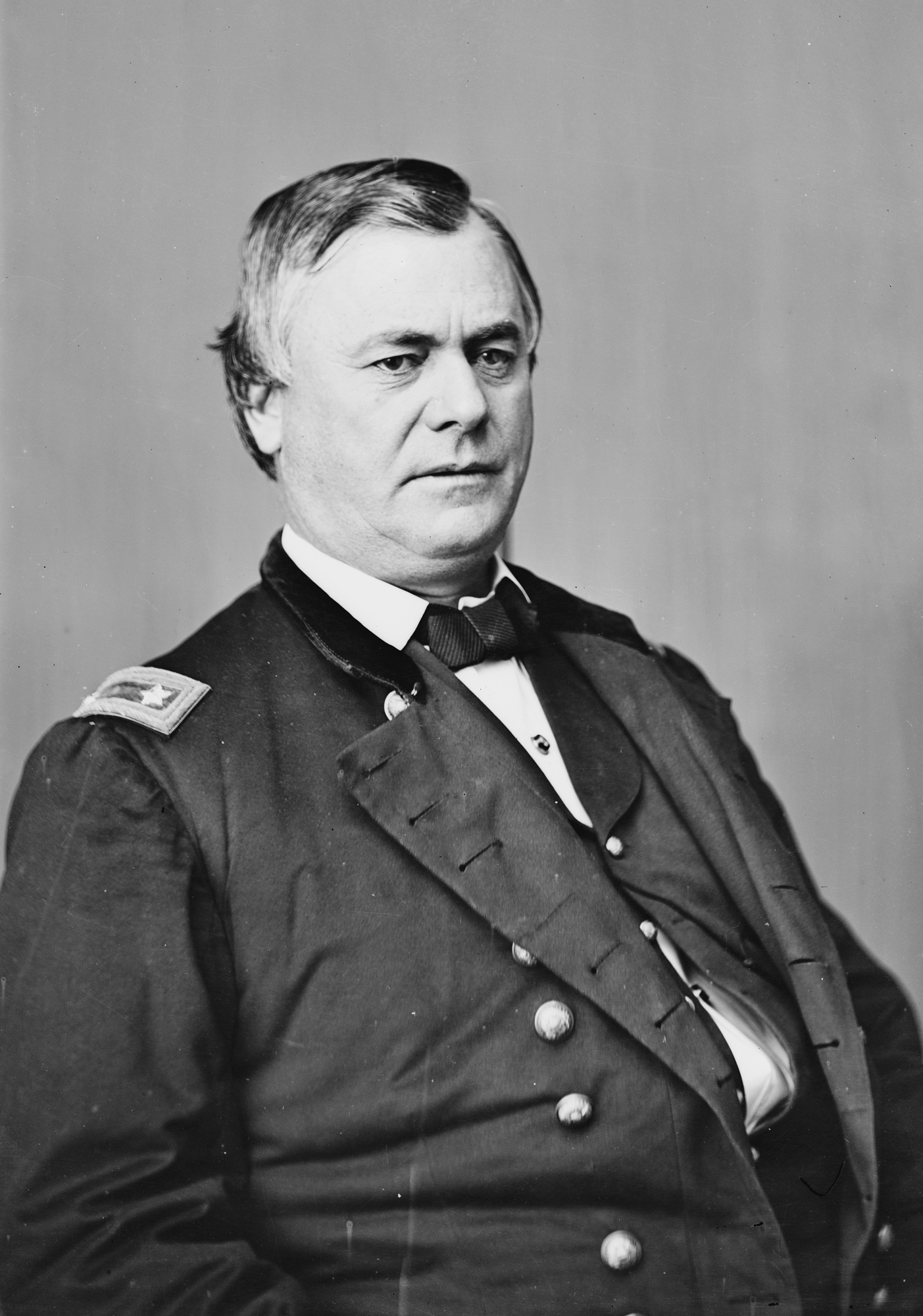
Oglesby as a major general in the Union Army, circa 1862–1863

At the start of the Civil War, Oglesby was appointed colonel of the 8th Illinois Volunteer Infantry Regiment. He was a well-liked commander, receiving the moniker "Uncle Dick" from his troops. He commanded his brigade at the battles of Fort Henry and Fort Donelson and soon after was promoted to the rank of brigadier general. He commanded troops during the Siege of Corinth. Oglesby sustained severe injuries in the Battle of Corinth in 1862 and was elevated to the status of major general that same year.

After a brief period of recovery, Oglesby resumed military service in 1863. However, at the request of Abraham Lincoln, he abandoned his commission in 1864, successfully running for Illinois governor on the Republican ticket.

He was present in the room at the Petersen House when President Abraham Lincoln died on April 15, 1865.

== Illinois politics ==
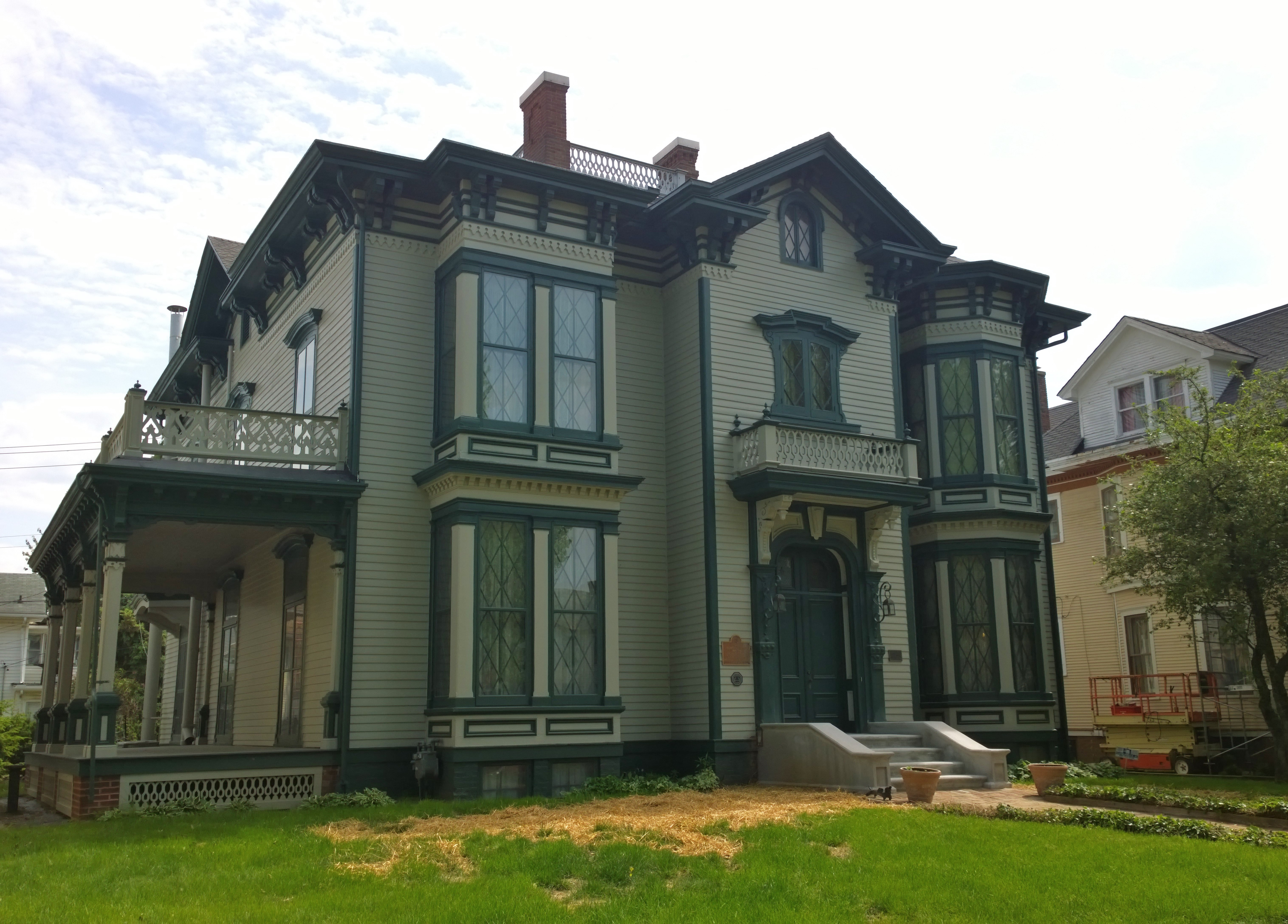
Oglesby Mansion on William Street in Decatur, Illinois where Oglesby and his wife Emma lived from 1874 to 1882

Oglesby first served as governor of Illinois from 1865 to 1869. During his tenure as governor, he advocated improving the quality of care of the mentally ill and for other groups of disabled citizens. He also signed legislation expanding the State Hospital system from one campus to three. After his term ended, he practiced law until 1872, when he agreed to a scheme in which Oglesby ran again for governor, but turned the office over to the lieutenant governor immediately after inauguration in return for a seat in the U.S. Senate. He served as a Senator from 1873 until 1879. In 1884, he was reelected governor for a third time, becoming the first man in Illinois history to serve three times as governor. At the end of his third term as governor, he tried unsuccessfully to be reelected to his Senate seat. He spent his remaining years in retirement and died at his "Oglehurst" estate in Elkhart, Illinois. He is buried there in Elkhart Cemetery. There is a statue of Richard J. Oglesby in Lincoln Park, Chicago.

His son, John G. Oglesby, was a two time Lieutenant Governor of Illinois.

== See also ==
- List of American Civil War generals (Union)

== Notes ==
Party political offices
Preceded by Richard Yates	Republican nominee for Governor of Illinois; 1864	Succeeded by John M. Palmer
Preceded by John M. Palmer	Republican nominee for Governor of Illinois; 1872	Succeeded by Shelby Moore Cullom
Preceded by Shelby Moore Cullom	Republican nominee for Governor of Illinois; 1884	Succeeded by Joseph W. Fifer
Political offices
Preceded by Richard Yates	Governor of Illinois; 1865–1869	Succeeded by John M. Palmer
Preceded by John M. Palmer	Governor of Illinois; 1873	Succeeded by John Lourie Beveridge
Preceded by John Marshall Hamilton	Governor of Illinois; 1885–1889	Succeeded by Joseph W. Fifer
U.S. Senate
Preceded by Lyman Trumbull	U.S. senator (Class 3) from Illinois; 1873–1879; Served alongside: John A. Logan, David Davis	Succeeded by John A. Logan
