= 1856 Illinois gubernatorial election =

- November 4, 1856
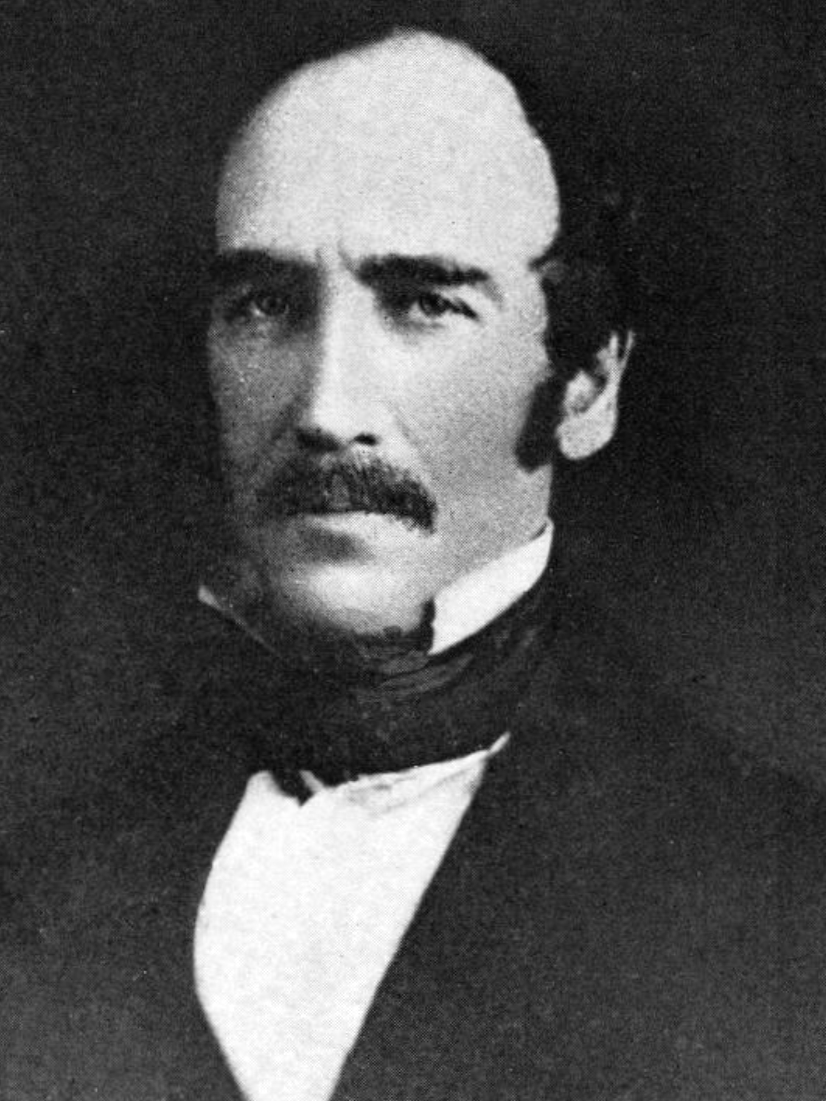

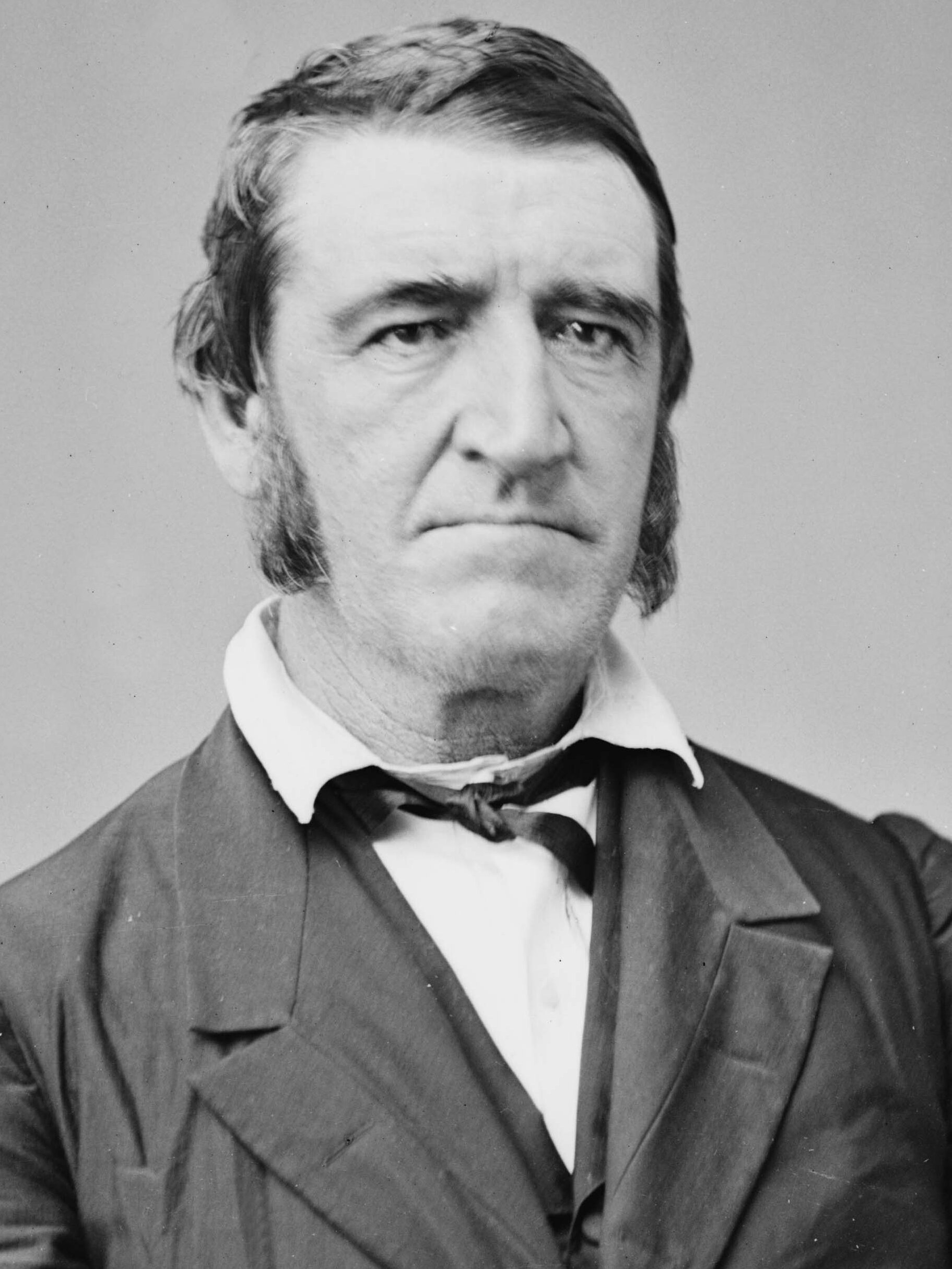

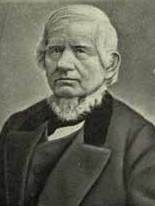
Nominee	William Henry Bissell	William Alexander Richardson	Buckner Stith Morris
Party	Republican	Democratic	American
Popular vote	111,466	106,769	19,088
Percentage	46.97%	44.99%	8.04%
- County results Bissell: 30–40% 40–50% 50–60% 60–70% 70–80% 80–90% Richardson: 40–50% 50–60% 60–70% 70–80% 80–90% 90–100% Morris: 40–50%
Governor before election
Joel Aldrich Matteson
Democratic
Elected Governor
William Henry Bissell
Republican

The 1856 Illinois gubernatorial election was held on November 4, 1856. Democratic governor Joel Aldrich Matteson did not seek re-election. Former Democratic U.S. representative William Henry Bissell was nominated by the newly formed Republican Party at the Bloomington Convention. Former Chicago mayor Buckner S. Morris was nominated on the Know-Nothing Party ticket.

Bissell was the first Republican and the first Catholic to be elected governor in Illinois history.

== General election ==
=== Candidates ===
- William Henry Bissell, former Democratic U.S. representative from Belleville (Republican)
- Buckner Stith Morris, former Whig mayor of Chicago (American)
- William Alexander Richardson, U.S. representative from Quincy (Democratic)

=== Campaign ===
The Democratic campaign focused upon Bissell's involvement in a duel with future Confederate States president Jefferson Davis, which purportedly disqualified him from state office, while the Republican campaign emphasized opposition to the Kansas-Nebraska Act. Despite Bissell's victory, Republican presidential nominee John C. Frémont failed to carry the state in the concurrent presidential election.

=== Results ===
1856 gubernatorial election, Illinois
Party	Candidate	Votes	%	±%
Republican	William Henry Bissell	111,466	46.97%	+5.21%
Democratic	William Alexander Richardson	106,769	44.99%	−7.40%
Know Nothing	Buckner S. Morris	19,088	8.04%	N/A
Majority		16,381	10.62%	−68.90%
Turnout		237,323	100.00%	
Republican gain from Democratic		Swing		

== See also ==
- 1856 Illinois lieutenant gubernatorial election
