= John Wood (Illinois politician) =

Governor of Illinois from 1860 to 1861

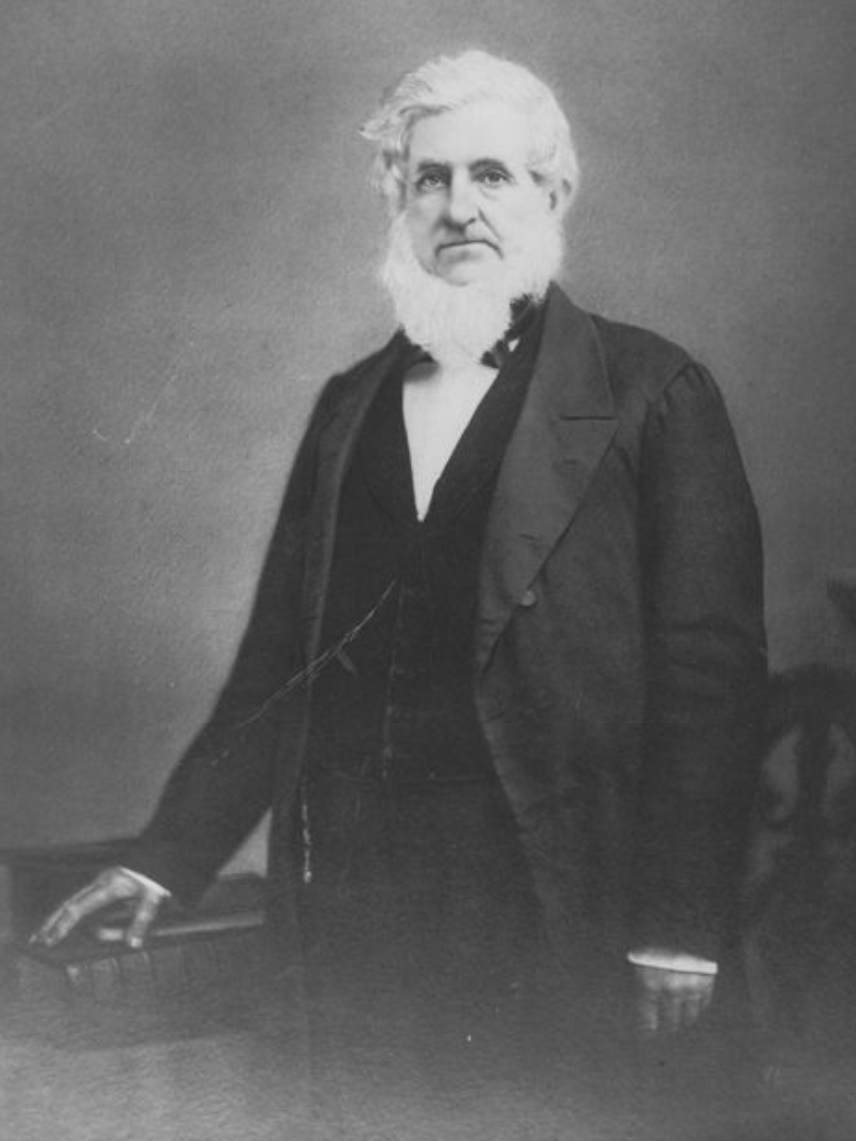

12th Governor of Illinois
- In office March 18, 1860 – January 14, 1861
- Lieutenant: Thomas Marshall
- Preceded by: William Henry Bissell
- Succeeded by: Richard Yates

13th Lieutenant Governor of Illinois
- In office January 12, 1857 – March 18, 1860
- Governor: William Henry Bissell
- Preceded by: Gustav Koerner
- Succeeded by: Thomas Marshall

Member of the Illinois Senate
- In office 1850

Personal details
- Born: December 20, 1798 Sempronius, New York, U.S.
- Died: June 4, 1880 (aged 81) Quincy, Illinois, U.S.
- Resting place: Woodland Cemetery
- Party: Republican
- Spouse(s): Ann M. Streeter; Mary Ann Holmes
- Occupation: Farmer, Banker, Businessman, Politician

John Wood (December 20, 1798 – June 4, 1880) was the 12th governor of Illinois, serving from March 18, 1860, to January 14, 1861. Wood was a founder and the first settler of Quincy, Illinois.

== Early years ==
Wood was born on December 20, 1798, in Sempronius, New York, in the area now known as Moravia. He was the second child and son of Dr. Daniel and Catherine Crause Wood. His mother became estranged from the family when John Wood was five and moved to Palatine, New York. Wood was sent to live with his older cousin, James, and his wife, Mary Armstrong Wood, in Florida, New York.

In the vanguard of adventurous young eastern emigrants, Wood on November 2, 1818, left his New York home. He initially planned to farm in Northern Alabama. In Cincinnati during the winter of 1818-1819, however, he gained access to two books by Edmund Dana, published in Cincinnati in 1818. A resident and surveyor in the Illinois Military Tract, land set aside by Congress as bounty for veterans of the War of 1812, Dana provided the lure that changed Wood's destination. Dana's books extolled the significant advantages of a promontory over the Mississippi River at Illinois' westernmost point. Wood moved west to land near Atlas in Pike County, Illinois, squatted (resided on land he did not own), and became a farmer. Here, Wood met land speculator Peter Flinn, from whom he bought 160 acres (65 ha) of land in the 3.5-million-acre Illinois Military Tract. Wood moved to his newly acquired land and with Jeremiah Rose in 1822 built a small, one-room log cabin on the east bank of the Mississippi River at today's Quincy, Illinois. Rose, his wife, and their five-year-old daughter lived with Wood in the cabin until 1826, when Wood married Ann M. Streeter of Salem, New York, daughter of Justice of the Peace Joshua Streeter.

== Land speculator ==
Intending to speculate in land in the Military Tract, Wood had arrived at the federal land office in Edwardsville, Illinois, where he met Willard Keyes, a Vermont native. Keyes had taught French and Indian children at Prairie du Chien, Wisconsin, for two years and become disenchanted with his profession and disappointed that he had accumulated nothing. Learning Wood had the same idea about speculating in land, Keyes formed an informal partnership with Wood. They journeyed to the site on the Mississippi that had attracted Wood west. It was a limestone bluff that rose nearly 100 feet above the river, at which the pair would found Quincy, Illinois.

At the land office, Wood also met Edward Coles, who would become Illinois' second governor in 1822. Appointed the federal land registrar by President James Monroe, Virginian Coles had released his eleven slaves while on the way to Illinois to take his post. As governor, Coles recruited Wood's help to fight a movement from 1822 to 1824 by the Illinois General Assembly, dominated by immigrants from Southern states, to amend the constitution to make Illinois a slave state. A referendum on August 3, 1824, for a constitutional convention for that purpose failed statewide by a ratio of 57 to 43 percent. In the territory in which John Wood fought the proposal, the plan for a slave constitution was defeated 90 to 10 percent. Wood considered his work to keep Illinois a free state one of his life's greatest achievements.

On September 14, 1824, Wood petitioned the Illinois General Assembly to organize Adams County, Illinois and on January 18, 1825, the measure passed. On April 30, 1825, the unincorporated town of Quincy, Illinois, was designated the county seat.

Wood continued to buy land in the Military Tract and sold it at a profit to immigrants arriving in Illinois. With his family growing, Wood in 1835 began construction of a 14-room Greek Revival mansion, the John Wood Mansion, next to his two-story log cabin. His choice of the Greek Revival architectural style was purposeful. The American Revolution fading from memory and the War of 1812 two decades earlier, Wood saw the recent overthrow of the Ottoman Empire by the Greeks, the birthplace of Democracy in 800 A.D., a rebirth of freedom. The Wood home was among the first Greek Revival structures in the Illinois. Wood himself turned the four large columns at the front of a house from coffeywood trees, which he selected, on a horse-powered lathe he fabricated. He built the home on the northwest side of today's 12th and State Street intersection. He found his craftsmen in St. Louis and New Orleans, where he sought men arriving from Germany who were skilled in construction trades. Fluent in German, Wood promised the men lots on the south side of his property on which they could build their homes if they would help Wood build his. The area today is Quincy's German Heritage District. The Association of Independent Architects in 2007 named the Governor John Wood Mansion one of the 150 most important structures in Illinois. The large mansion is now owned by the Historical Society of Quincy and Adams County and is open for tours from April through October.

== Politician ==
Wood was elected to seven one-year terms as mayor of Quincy 1844–1848, 1852–53 and 1856) and to the Illinois state senate in 1850. Earlier a Whig, Wood became a Republican and was elected Illinois' first Republican Lieutenant Governor of Illinois in 1856. When Governor William Henry Bissell died on March 18, 1860, three years into his four-year term, Wood succeeded him, becoming the state's 12th governor. The General Assembly, soon to adjourn its session in early 1860, granted Wood's request that he be allowed to remain in Quincy to manage business interests and the construction of his stone octagonal mansion. A room on the south side of his Greek Revival mansion was expanded to become the official governor's office of the State of Illinois. While conducting the governor's business from Quincy, Wood permitted Abraham Lincoln to use the governor's office in the state capitol building in Springfield during his 1860 presidential campaign. Wood also allowed Governor Bissell's widow to continue to live in the new executive mansion. Wood's greatest achievement in his ten months as governor was his work to reorganize the Illinois militia, which had been neglected since the end of the Mexican War. With business interests pressing Wood, he declined his party's request to run for re-election.

== Civil War ==
Governor Richard Yates appointed Wood one of five Illinois delegates to the failed "Peace Convention" in Washington, D.C., in February 1861. After the start of the Civil War in April, John Wood was named Quartermaster General of the State of Illinois. In 1863, at age 65, Wood became even more personally involved in the Civil War. He raised men for the 137th Illinois 100-day volunteers. Wood and the 137th were assigned to duty in southwest Tennessee, and Wood was given command of three more regiments. His own regiment fought a four-hour battle on August 21, 1863, against one of Confederate General Nathan Bedford Forrest's regiments.

In 1863, Wood's wife Ann died, and he married Mary Ann Holmes.

== Final years ==
Wood's octagonal mansion was completed in 1864 and his Greek Revival mansion went to his eldest son, Daniel. The octagonal home, built at a cost of $100,000, was the most expensive house in Illinois at that time. An economic decline in 1875 cost Wood his fortune, and creditors forced him to sell his assets, including the stone mansion. It fetched $40,000. Bankrupt, Wood moved back into the Greek Revival mansion he had built four decades earlier.

John Wood died at home on June 4, 1880. He was 81. His body is interred in the family plot at Woodland Cemetery, established on 45 acres he donated to the City of Quincy in 1846.

John Wood Community College in Quincy is named for the former Governor. A life-size statue of the former governor has been placed in the Illinois State Capitol.

Party political offices
First	Republican nominee for Lieutenant Governor of Illinois; 1856	Succeeded by Francis Hoffmann
Political offices
Preceded by Gustavus Koerner	Lieutenant Governor of Illinois; 1857–1860	Succeeded by Thomas Marshall
Preceded by William Henry Bissell	Governor of Illinois; 1860–1861	Succeeded by Richard Yates
