= Lieutenant Governor of Illinois =

Second highest executive of the U.S. State of Illinois

- Great Seal of the State of Illinois

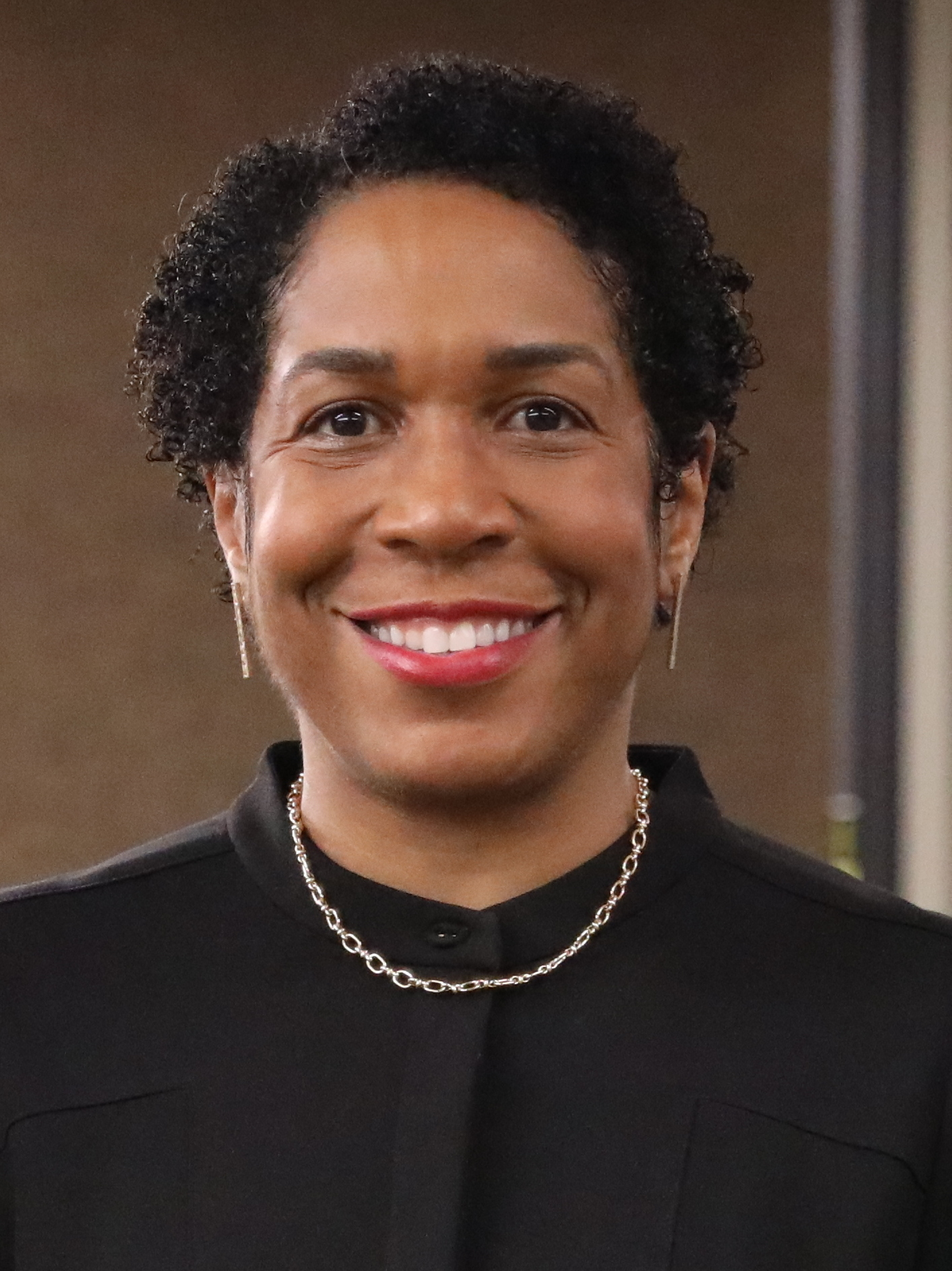
- Incumbent; Juliana Stratton since January 14, 2019
- Government of Illinois
- Term length: 4 years, no term limits
- Inaugural holder: Pierre Menard
- Formation: 1818
- Succession: First
- Salary: $139,200
- Website: www2.illinois.gov/agencies/LTGOV

The lieutenant governor of Illinois is the second highest executive of the State of Illinois. In Illinois, the lieutenant governor and governor run on a joint ticket and are directly elected by popular vote. Gubernatorial candidates select their running mates when filing for office and appear on the primary election ballot together. Under the Illinois Constitution, when the governor of Illinois becomes unable to discharge the duties of that office, the lieutenant governor becomes acting governor. If the governor dies, resigns or is removed from office, the lieutenant governor becomes governor. Pat Quinn was the most recent lieutenant to rise to governor on the impeachment of Rod Blagojevich in 2009. The Lieutenant Governor oversees various state commissions under Illinois statutes. Historically, the lieutenant governor has been from either the Democratic Party or Republican Party. The current lieutenant governor is Democrat Juliana Stratton. Stratton became the first African American elected to this position.

Prior to the 1970 Constitution, governors and lieutenant governors were separately elected. The 1970 Constitution introduced joint elections for governor and lieutenant governor, though the candidates were nominated in separate primaries. Following the 1986 and 2010 elections, in which the Democratic nominees for Governor were forced to run with extreme or disfavored lieutenant-gubernatorial nominees, the Illinois General Assembly abolished the separate-primary requirement. The 2014 gubernatorial election was the first one to take place in which gubernatorial and lieutenant gubernatorial candidates ran on the same ticket in the primary election.

== Duties ==
The lieutenant governor of Illinois handles a variety of responsibilities which have been delegated to the office via statute. These duties include serving as Chairman of the Governor's Rural Affairs Council, Chairman of Rural Bond Bank of Illinois, head of the Illinois Main Street Program, and Chairman of the Illinois River Coordinating Council.

In addition to these duties, the lieutenant governor can take on other duties as assigned by the governor or initiate duties of his or her own. An example of this is work by former Lt. Gov. Corrine Wood on women's health issues. The lieutenant governor also serves as a surrogate speaker for the governor around the state and as a representative for state government. The lieutenant governor is a member of the National Lieutenant Governors Association.

Prior to the adoption of the Illinois Constitution of 1970, the lieutenant governor also served as the president of the Senate. Losing this position made the lieutenant governor's job less significant, and contributed to the "boredom" cited by Jim Thompson's first lieutenant governor, Dave O'Neal, who resigned from the office in 1981.

Under the Illinois state Constitution Article V section 7. "If the Lieutenant Governor fails to qualify or if his office becomes vacant, it shall remain vacant until the end of the term." Illinois thus had no lieutenant governor during the two-year interim between Pat Quinn's elevation to the governor's office upon Rod Blagojevich's impeachment conviction, and Sheila Simon's election and inauguration as lieutenant governor.

Like the governor, the lieutenant governor has suites of offices in both Springfield and Chicago.

== Qualifications ==
The lieutenant governor of Illinois serves four-year terms. Inauguration takes place on the second Monday in January following a gubernatorial election. A lieutenant governor is

- required to be at least twenty-five years old,
- required to be a United States citizen,
- required to have been a resident of Illinois for the three years previous to election,
- barred from other government positions during the term.

== List of lieutenant governors of Illinois ==
On three occasions, prior to a 1970 change to the state constitution, the lieutenant governor was of a different political party from the governor. In each instance a Democratic lieutenant governor served under a Republican governor. After the lieutenant governor comes the attorney general.

#	Image	Lt. governor	Party	Commission date	End date	Governor	Party	Term
1		Pierre Menard	Democratic-Republican	October 6, 1818	December 5, 1822	Shadrach Bond	Democratic- Republican	1818–1822
2		Adolphus Hubbard	Democratic- Republican	December 5, 1822	December 6, 1826	Edward Coles	Democratic- Republican	1822–1826
3		William Kinney	Democratic	December 6, 1826	December 9, 1830	Ninian Edwards	Democratic- Republican	1826–1830
4		Zadok Casey	Democratic	December 9, 1830	March 1, 1833 (resigned)	John Reynolds	Democratic	1830–1834
5		William Lee D. Ewing	Democratic	March 1, 1833	December 5, 1834 (succeeded Reynolds)	John Reynolds	Democratic	1830–1834
Office vacant: November 17 – December 5, 1834						William Lee D. Ewing	Democratic	1834
6		Alexander Jenkins	Democratic	December 5, 1834	December 9, 1836 (resigned)	Joseph Duncan	Democratic	1834–1838
7		William H. Davidson	Democratic	December 9, 1836 (acting)	December 7, 1838	Joseph Duncan	Democratic	1834–1838
8		Stinson Anderson	Democratic	December 7, 1838	December 8, 1842	Thomas Carlin	Democratic	1838–1842
9		John Moore	Democratic	December 8, 1842	December 9, 1846	Thomas Ford	Democratic	1842–1846
10		Joseph Wells	Democratic	December 9, 1846	January 8, 1849	Augustus C. French	Democratic	1846–1853
11		William McMurtry	Democratic	January 8, 1849	January 10, 1853	Augustus C. French	Democratic	1846–1853
12		Gustavus Koerner	Democratic	January 10, 1853	January 12, 1857	Joel Aldrich Matteson	Democratic	1853–1857
13		John Wood	Republican	January 12, 1857	March 20, 1860	William Henry Bissell	Republican	1857–1860
14		Thomas Marshall	Democratic	January 7, 1861	January 14, 1861	John Wood	Republican	1860–1861
15		Francis Hoffmann	Republican	January 14, 1861	January 16, 1865	Richard Yates	Republican	1861–1865
16		William Bross	Republican	January 16, 1865	January 11, 1869	Richard J. Oglesby	Republican	1865–1869
17		John Dougherty	Republican	January 11, 1869	January 13, 1873	John M. Palmer	Republican	1869–1873
18		John Lourie Beveridge	Republican	January 13, 1873	January 23, 1873 (succeeded Oglesby)	Richard J. Oglesby	Republican	1873
19		John Early	Republican	January 23, 1873 (acting)	January 8, 1875	John Lourie Beveridge	Republican	1873–1877
20		Archibald Glenn	Democratic	January 8, 1875 (acting)	January 8, 1877	John Lourie Beveridge	Republican	1873–1877
21		Andrew Shuman	Republican	January 8, 1877	January 10, 1881	Shelby M. Cullom	Republican	1877–1883
22		John Marshall Hamilton	Republican	January 10, 1881	February 6, 1883 (succeeded Cullom)	Shelby M. Cullom	Republican	1877–1883
23		William J. Campbell	Republican	February 6, 1883 Acting	January 30, 1885	John Marshall Hamilton	Republican	1883–1885
24		John Smith	Republican	January 30, 1885	January 14, 1889	Richard J. Oglesby	Republican	1885–1889
25		Lyman Ray	Republican	January 14, 1889	January 10, 1893	Joseph W. Fifer	Republican	1889–1893
26		Joseph B. Gill	Democratic	January 10, 1893	January 11, 1897	John Peter Altgeld	Democratic	1893–1897
27		William Northcott	Republican	January 11, 1897	January 9, 1905	John R. Tanner	Republican	1897–1901
27		William Northcott	Republican	January 11, 1897	January 9, 1905	Richard Yates	Republican	1901–1905
28		Lawrence Sherman	Republican	January 9, 1905	January 18, 1909	Charles S. Deneen	Republican	1905–1913
29		John G. Oglesby	Republican	January 18, 1909	February 3, 1913	Charles S. Deneen	Republican	1905–1913
30		Barratt O'Hara	Democratic	February 3, 1913	January 8, 1917	Edward F. Dunne	Democratic	1913–1917
31		John G. Oglesby	Republican	January 8, 1917	January 10, 1921	Frank O. Lowden	Republican	1917–1921
32		Fred E. Sterling	Republican	January 10, 1921	January 9, 1933	Len Small	Republican	1921–1929
32		Fred E. Sterling	Republican	January 10, 1921	January 9, 1933	Louis L. Emmerson	Republican	1929–1933
33		Thomas Donovan	Democratic	January 9, 1933	January 4, 1937	Henry Horner	Democratic	1933–1940
34		John H. Stelle	Democratic	January 4, 1937	October 6, 1940 (succeeded Horner)	Henry Horner	Democratic	1933–1940
Office vacant: October 6, 1940 – January 13, 1941						John H. Stelle	Democratic	1940–1941
35		Hugh W. Cross	Republican	January 13, 1941	January 10, 1949	Dwight H. Green	Republican	1941–1949
36		Sherwood Dixon	Democratic	January 10, 1949	January 12, 1953	Adlai Stevenson II	Democratic	1949–1953
37		John William Chapman	Republican	January 12, 1953	January 9, 1961	William Stratton	Republican	1953–1961
38		Samuel Shapiro	Democratic	January 9, 1961	May 21, 1968 (succeeded Kerner)	Otto Kerner Jr.	Democratic	1961–1968
Office vacant: May 21, 1968 – January 13, 1969						Samuel Shapiro	Democratic	1968–1969
39		Paul Simon	Democratic	January 13, 1969	January 8, 1973	Richard B. Ogilvie	Republican	1969–1973
40		Neil Hartigan	Democratic	January 8, 1973	January 10, 1977	Dan Walker	Democratic	1973–1977
41		Dave O'Neal	Republican	January 10, 1977	July 31, 1981 (resigned)	Jim Thompson	Republican	1977–1991
Office vacant: July 31, 1981 – January 10, 1983						Jim Thompson	Republican	1977–1991
42		George Ryan	Republican	January 10, 1983	January 14, 1991	Jim Thompson	Republican	1977–1991
43		Bob Kustra	Republican	January 14, 1991	July 1, 1998 (resigned)	Jim Edgar	Republican	1991–1999
Office vacant: July 1, 1998 – January 11, 1999						Jim Edgar	Republican	1991–1999
44		Corinne Wood	Republican	January 11, 1999	January 13, 2003	George Ryan	Republican	1999–2003
45		Pat Quinn	Democratic	January 13, 2003	January 29, 2009 (succeeded Blagojevich)	Rod Blagojevich	Democratic	2003–2009
Office vacant: January 29, 2009 – January 10, 2011						Pat Quinn	Democratic	2009–2015
46		Sheila Simon	Democratic	January 10, 2011	January 12, 2015	Pat Quinn	Democratic	2009–2015
47		Evelyn Sanguinetti	Republican	January 12, 2015	January 14, 2019	Bruce Rauner	Republican	2015–2019
48		Juliana Stratton	Democratic	January 14, 2019	Incumbent	J. B. Pritzker	Democratic	2019–present

== See also ==
- List of Illinois state legislatures
