= William Bross =

American politician and publisher (1813–1890)

William J. Bross
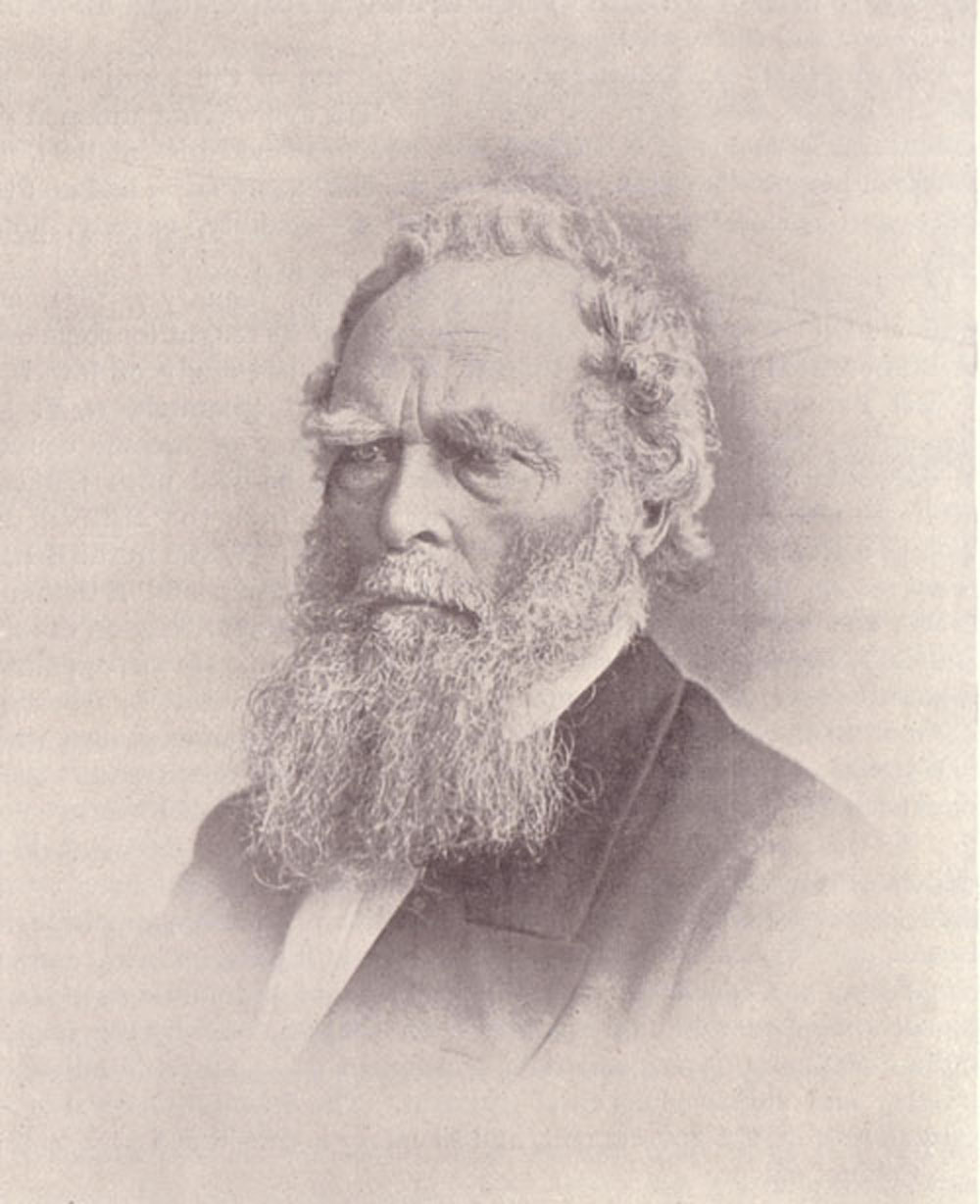

16th Lieutenant Governor of Illinois
- In office January 16, 1865 – January 11, 1869
- Governor: Richard J. Oglesby
- Preceded by: Francis Hoffmann
- Succeeded by: John Dougherty

Member of the Chicago City Council from the 1st ward
- In office 1857–1859 Serving with James Long
- Preceded by: Sylvester Sexton
- Succeeded by: J.K. Botsford

Personal details
- Born: November 4, 1813 Sussex County, New Jersey
- Died: January 27, 1890 (aged 76) Chicago, Illinois
- Resting place: Rosehill Cemetery
- Party: Republican
- Children: Jessie Bross Lloyd
- Education: Williams College
- Profession: Newspaper editor
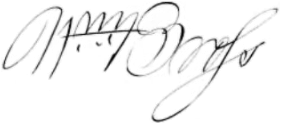
- Signature

William J. Bross (November 4, 1813 – January 27, 1890) was an American politician and publisher originally from the New Jersey–New York–Pennsylvania tri-state area. He was also elected as the 16th Lieutenant Governor of Illinois.

He engaged in the lumber trade with his father before attending Williams College. He taught at schools for ten years, then headed west to Chicago, Illinois. He engaged in book-selling and publishing interests before co-founding the successful Democratic Press paper. Following the organization of the Republican Party in 1854, Bross became a staunch supporter of its political candidates. His support for Abraham Lincoln helped him win support for a bid as lieutenant governor. In 1865, he accompanied future Vice President of the United States Schuyler Colfax on a trip west to California, later publishing a book about the excursion.

== Biography ==
William Bross was born on November 4, 1813, in northwest Sussex County, New Jersey. He was the eldest of eleven children of Deacon Moses Bross and Jane (Winfield) Bross. He was the eldest because he was born a few minutes before his twin Stephen Decatur Bross. When they were nine, the family moved to Milford, Pennsylvania, in anticipation of the construction of the Delaware and Hudson Canal. The boys worked with their father to furnish lumber for the canal near Shohola.

In 1832, Bross enrolled at Milford Academy, then attended Williams College, rooming with his twin brother. William Bross was one of the founding members of The Social Fraternity at Williams, forerunner to Delta Upsilon. Shortly after graduating in 1838, he became the principal of Ridgebury Academy in Ridgebury, New York. In 1843, he began to teach at a school in Chester, Pennsylvania, where he worked for another five years. Starting in 1846, Bross took trips west to identify a better place to settle. He decided on the emerging city of Chicago, Illinois, which he reached on May 12, 1848.

Bross quickly formed a partnership with S. C. Griggs and the Newman & Co. publishing house, opening the book-selling firm of Griggs, Bross & Co. The partnership dissolved eighteen months later. In the autumn of 1849, Bross co-published the Prairie Herald, a religious newspaper, with Rev. J. A. Wright. Bross first achieved prosperity in 1852 when he teamed with Chicago Postmaster John L. Scripps to start the Democratic Press. The paper espoused Democratic viewpoints, but differed from the party line regarding slavery, notably opposing Stephen A. Douglas's repeal of the Missouri Compromise.

When the Republican Party formed in 1854, Bross became a public speaker on behalf of the cause. He gave the first public endorsement of John C. Frémont for President in the West, speaking at Dearborn Park the night he was nominated. Bross toured southern Illinois, generally a pro-slavery area, to extoll the virtues of Frémont. While at the former State House in Vandalia, Illinois, he became acquainted with fellow Frémont campaigner Abraham Lincoln and the two would often speak at the same engagements.

In 1857, Bross was elected to the Chicago City Council, and represented the 1st ward until 1859. The Democratic Press struggled financially after the Panic of 1857. On July 1, 1858, the paper was merged into the Tribune, creating The Press and Tribune. Bross advocated for Abraham Lincoln for President following his nomination. Following the outbreak of the Civil War, in 1863 Bross helped to raise the 29th Regiment, United States Colored Infantry. It was commanded by one of his brothers, Col. John A. Bross, who was killed on July 30, 1864, during the Siege of Petersburg.

Bross's support of Lincoln helped him to gain nomination as the Republican candidate for Lieutenant Governor of Illinois under Richard J. Oglesby. He traveled with Speaker of the United States House of Representatives Schuyler Colfax in 1865 to examine the path west to California. two years later he traveled to Europe with his daughter.

=== Personal life ===
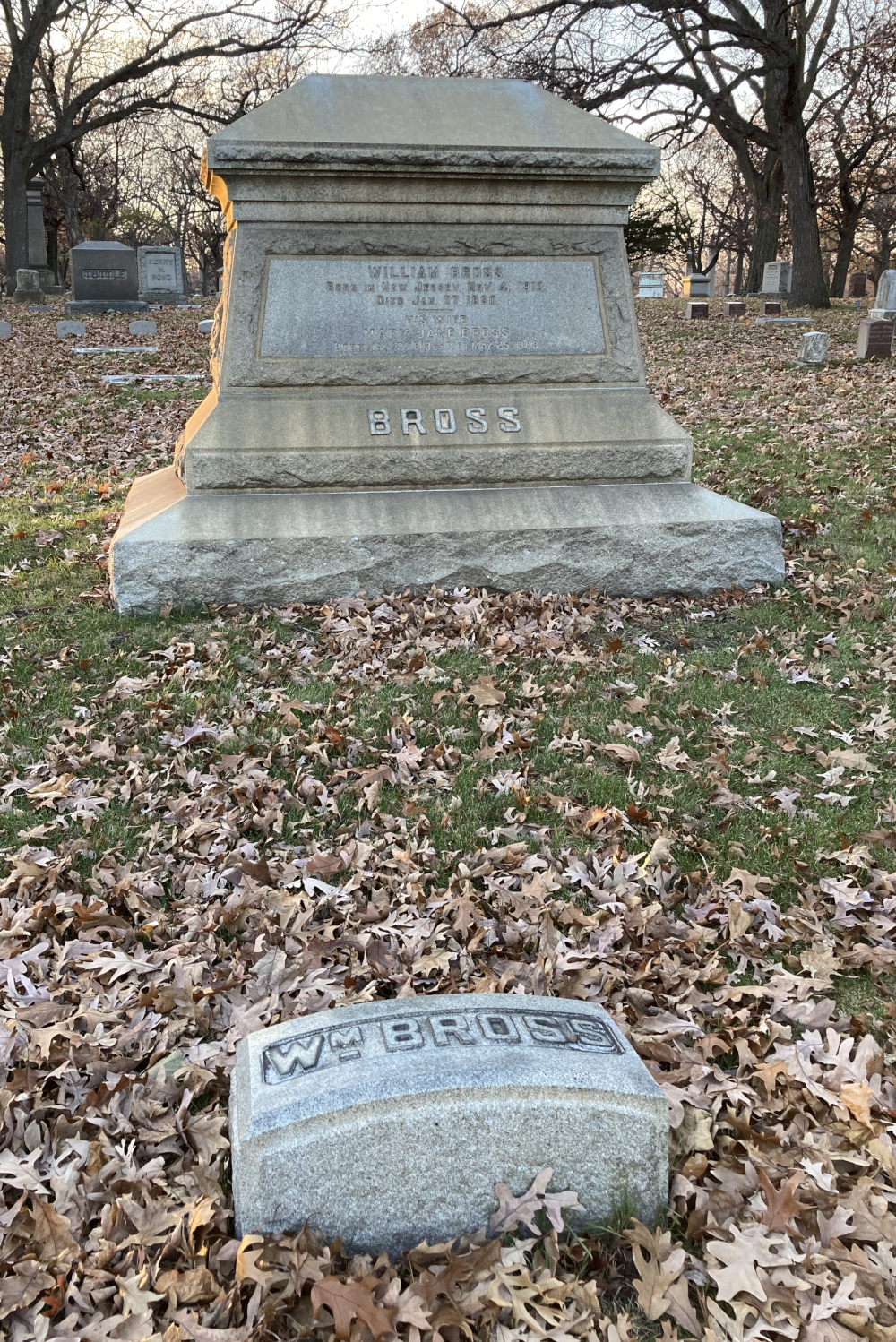
Bross's grave at Rosehill Cemetery

Soon after graduating from college and gaining his first job, in 1839 Bross married Mary Jane Jansen, the daughter of Dr. John T. Jansen. They had four sons and four daughters, but only one child, Jessie, survived to adulthood. Their daughter Jessie Bross married Henry Demarest Lloyd, known as a muckraking journalist. Grandson William Bross Lloyd was a founding members of the Communist Labor Party of America.

In 1879, Bross established the Bross Foundation at Lake Forest University in memory of his son Nathaniel. He donated $40,000 to invest over ten years to buy literature "on the connection, relation, and mutual bearing of any practical science, the history of our race, or the facts in any department of knowledge, with and upon the Christian Religion." University trustees offered $6,000 as a prize to one who would author a book best fulfilling these conditions; it was won by James Orr of United Free Church College for Problems of the Old Testament Considered with Reference to Recent Criticism. The fund also enabled the university to pay for lecturers, who included Francis Landey Patton, Marcus Dods, John Arthur Thomson, Frederick J. Bliss, and Josiah Royce.

Bross died in Chicago on January 27, 1890, and was buried in Rosehill Cemetery.

Party political offices
| Preceded by Francis Hoffmann | Republican nominee for Lieutenant Governor of Illinois; 1864 | Succeeded by John Dougherty |
Political offices
| Preceded by Francis Hoffmann | Lieutenant Governor of Illinois; 1865-1869 | Succeeded by John Dougherty |
