= William Henry Bissell =

American politician (1811–1860)

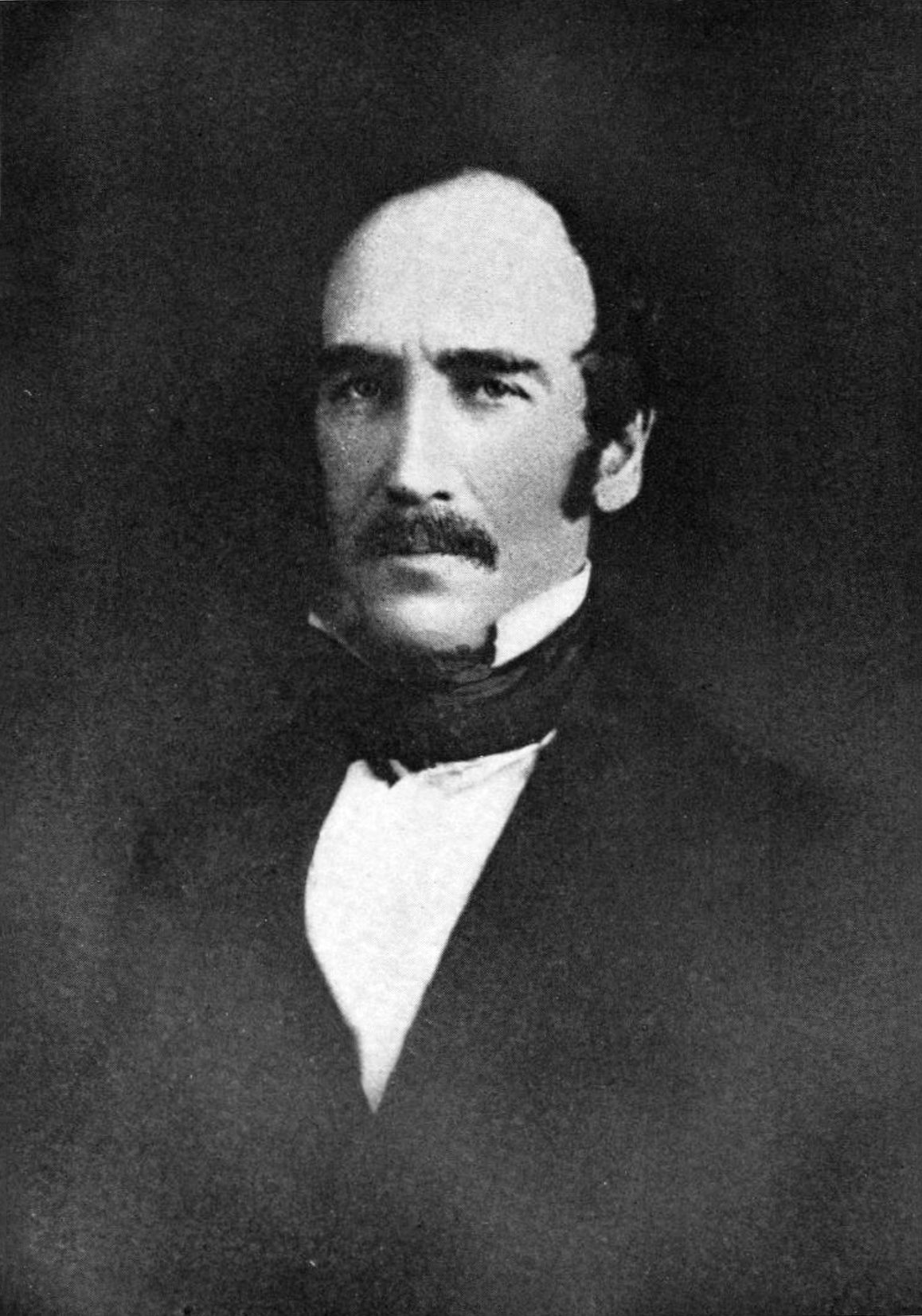

11th Governor of Illinois
- In office January 12, 1857 – March 18, 1860
- Lieutenant: John Wood
- Preceded by: Joel Aldrich Matteson
- Succeeded by: John Wood

Member of the U.S. House of Representatives from Illinois
- In office March 4, 1849 – March 3, 1855
- Preceded by: Robert Smith (1st); District established (8th)
- Succeeded by: Elihu B. Washburne (1st); James L. D. Morrison (8th)
- Constituency: 1st district (1849-53); 8th district (1853-55)

Member of the Illinois House of Representatives
- In office 1840–1842

Personal details
- Born: April 25, 1811 Hartwick, New York, U.S.
- Died: March 18, 1860 (aged 48) Springfield, Illinois, U.S.
- Party: Democratic, Republican
- Spouse(s): Emily Susan Jones, Elizabeth Kane
- Profession: Physician, lawyer, politician

Military service
- Branch/service: United States Army
- Years of service: 1846–1847
- Rank: Colonel
- Commands: 2nd Illinois Infantry Regiment
- Battles/wars: Mexican–American War: Battle of Buena Vista

William Henry Bissell (April 25, 1811 – March 18, 1860) was the 11th governor of the U.S. state of Illinois from 1857 until his death. He was one of the first successful Republican Party candidates in the U.S., winning the election of 1856 just two years after the founding of his party. In addition to being the first Republican governor of Illinois, he was also the first Catholic and also the first to die in office.

== Biography ==
Bissell was born in Hartwick, New York, near Painted Post, son of Luther Bissell and Hannah Shepard. He attended the public schools and was graduated from the Philadelphia Medical College in 1835. He moved to Monroe County, Illinois in 1837, where he taught school and practiced medicine until 1840.

From 1840 to 1842, Bissell was a member of the Illinois House of Representatives. He studied law, was admitted to the bar and commenced practice in Belleville, St. Clair County, Illinois. He was prosecuting attorney of St. Clair County in 1844.

He served in the Mexican War as colonel of the Second Regiment, Illinois Volunteer Infantry, where he most likely contracted the syphilis that crippled him and contributed to his death at age 48.

Bissell was elected as a Democrat to the Thirty-first and Thirty-second Congresses and as an Independent Democrat to the Thirty-third Congress (March 4, 1849 – March 3, 1855); he was chairman of the Committee on Military Affairs (Thirty-second and Thirty-third Congresses). He was not a candidate for re-nomination in 1854.

Bissell, true to his anti-slavery convictions, held a very definite dislike for his Southern colleagues, whom he described collectively as "insolent, overbearing and bullying beyond all belief." A nearly hour-long speech on the House floor, in retaliation for distortive comments made by James Seddon of Virginia, regarding the Battle of Buena Vista, in which Bissell fought, won approval from Bissell's fellow Illinoisans, but inflamed Jefferson Davis, who felt personally slighted by the speech. Davis challenged Bissell to a duel, which Northern Congressmen were known to refuse. Bissell not only accepted the challenge, but in his rights as the party challenged, specified army muskets, loaded with ball and buckshot, at close range. Davis then cleverly accepted further explanation for the seemingly offensive comments in Bissell's speech, but lost face with some in backing down.

Though hostilities were never commenced on the field of honor, this incident disqualified Bissell from holding state office in Illinois, according to the state Constitution of 1848. All state officials, as a part of their inauguration oath, had to swear as to never having participated in a duel, either by fighting in one, accepting a challenge or even acting as a second. Once back in Illinois, Bissell, who had broken ties with Stephen A. Douglas over the slavery extension issue, came under the wing of Lincoln and the Republicans, emerging as a rare Catholic in early Republican ranks. In the gubernatorial election of 1856, Abraham Lincoln determined that a former Democrat stood the best chance of defeating the Democratic candidate, William Alexander Richardson of Quincy, a subordinate of Douglas'. Bissell, by the mid-1850s, was partially paralyzed, able to walk only with use of a cane and "the aid of a friendly arm". He was nominated unopposed, on May 29, 1856, at Bloomington.

The Democrats made good work of the "duel" issue throughout the campaign and even after the election, which Bissell carried by 4,787 votes in a three-candidate field. The facts were plain: If Bissell took the anti-dueling oath, he was to therefore perjure himself. Bissell slipped the bonds of the charge by pointing out that the duel acceptance occurred in the District of Columbia, and was therefore not subject to the Illinois Constitution. The actual offense, of course, was the perjury itself, perpetrated when Bissell, with embarrassed but tacit approval from the Republicans, took the oath at Springfield.

Bissell, able only now to walk with crutches, has been the only governor of Illinois to be inaugurated in the Executive Mansion itself; he never entered the Capitol during the three-plus years he served. All official business was transacted from the second floor of the Executive Mansion.

In 1859, Bissell approved the exchange of a special class of bonds the state had previously devalued, known as Macalister-Stebbins bonds, at par plus interest. After receiving intense criticism from the Democratic press, he rescinded his decision. The transaction was successfully reversed without financial loss to the state, though Bissell's reputation suffered.

Bissell served as governor from January 12, 1857, until his death. He died at the Illinois Executive Mansion in Springfield from pneumonia and was interred in Oak Ridge Cemetery. He was the first Illinois governor to die in office.

== Personal life ==
After Bissell's first wife died, in 1854 he was married to Elizabeth Kane, daughter of former United States Senator Elias Kane.

Party political offices
First	Republican nominee for Governor of Illinois; 1856	Succeeded by Richard Yates
U.S. House of Representatives
Preceded by Robert Smith	Member of the U.S. House of Representatives from Illinois's 1st congressional district 1849–1853	Succeeded by Elihu B. Washburne
Preceded by District created	Member of the U.S. House of Representatives from Illinois's 8th congressional district 1853–1855	Succeeded by James L. D. Morrison
Political offices
Preceded by Joel Aldrich Matteson	Governor of Illinois; 1857–1860	Succeeded by John Wood
