= Francis Hoffmann =

American politician

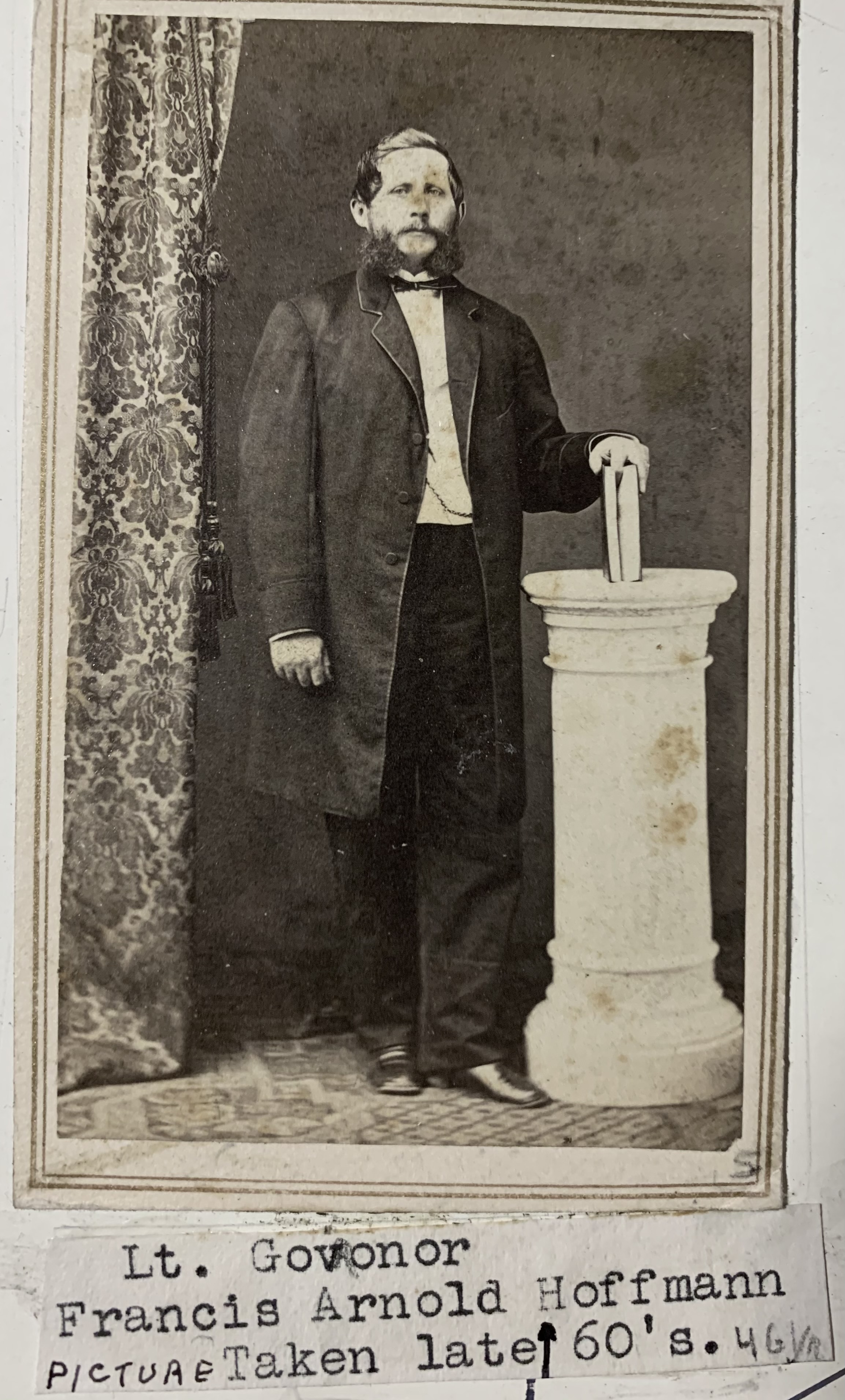
Lt. Governor Francis Arnold Hoffmann, late 1860s

Francis Arnold Hoffmann (June 5, 1822 – January 23, 1903) was a German-American Lutheran clergyman, politician, banker and writer.

== Biography ==
He was born in Westphalia, Prussia, the son of Fredrick and Wilhelmina (Groppe) Hoffmann. In 1840 he emigrated to the United States to avoid conscription, and settled in Illinois.

Hoffmann was a teacher and a pastor in Dunklee's Grove (now Addison, Illinois) until 1847. During this time he became active in public affairs and served as postmaster, town clerk and member of the school board. He also began writing and contributed articles to the Chicago Democrat and Prairie Farmer. In 1844 he married Cynthia Gilbert.

He served as pastor and teacher at St. Peter Lutheran Church and School in Schaumburg from 1847 to 1851. In 1851 Hoffmann moved to Chicago, studied law and became an attorney. In 1852 he was elected to the city council. Hoffmann worked to attract German immigrants to Chicago and was able to establish a successful banking business using the money entrusted to him by the German community.

In 1853–54, he served as an alderman on the Chicago Common Council (city council), representing the 8th ward.

Hoffmann was a vigorous opponent of the extension of slavery, an issue brought into prominence by the Kansas-Nebraska Act of 1854. He left the Democratic Party and played a role in the election of Lyman Trumbull to the United States Senate. He helped to found the Republican Party in Illinois and was a political supporter and ally of Abraham Lincoln. He was elected the 15th Lieutenant Governor of Illinois and served from 1861 to 1865.

After the Civil War, Hoffmann worked for the Illinois Central Railroad as a land commissioner and established the International Bank (his first bank had failed during the war). After the Great Chicago Fire in 1871 he chaired a committee of city bankers whose efforts successfully avoided a banking panic.

In 1875, he retired to his estate in Jefferson, Wisconsin and devoted himself to farming and horticulture. As an agricultural writer and editor, he wrote using the pen name "Hans Buschbauer".

Party political offices
Preceded by John Wood	Republican nominee for Lieutenant Governor of Illinois; 1860	Succeeded by William Bross
Political offices
Preceded by Thomas Marshall	Lieutenant Governor of Illinois; 1861-1865	Succeeded by William Bross
