= Charles S. Deneen =

American attorney and politician (1863–1940)

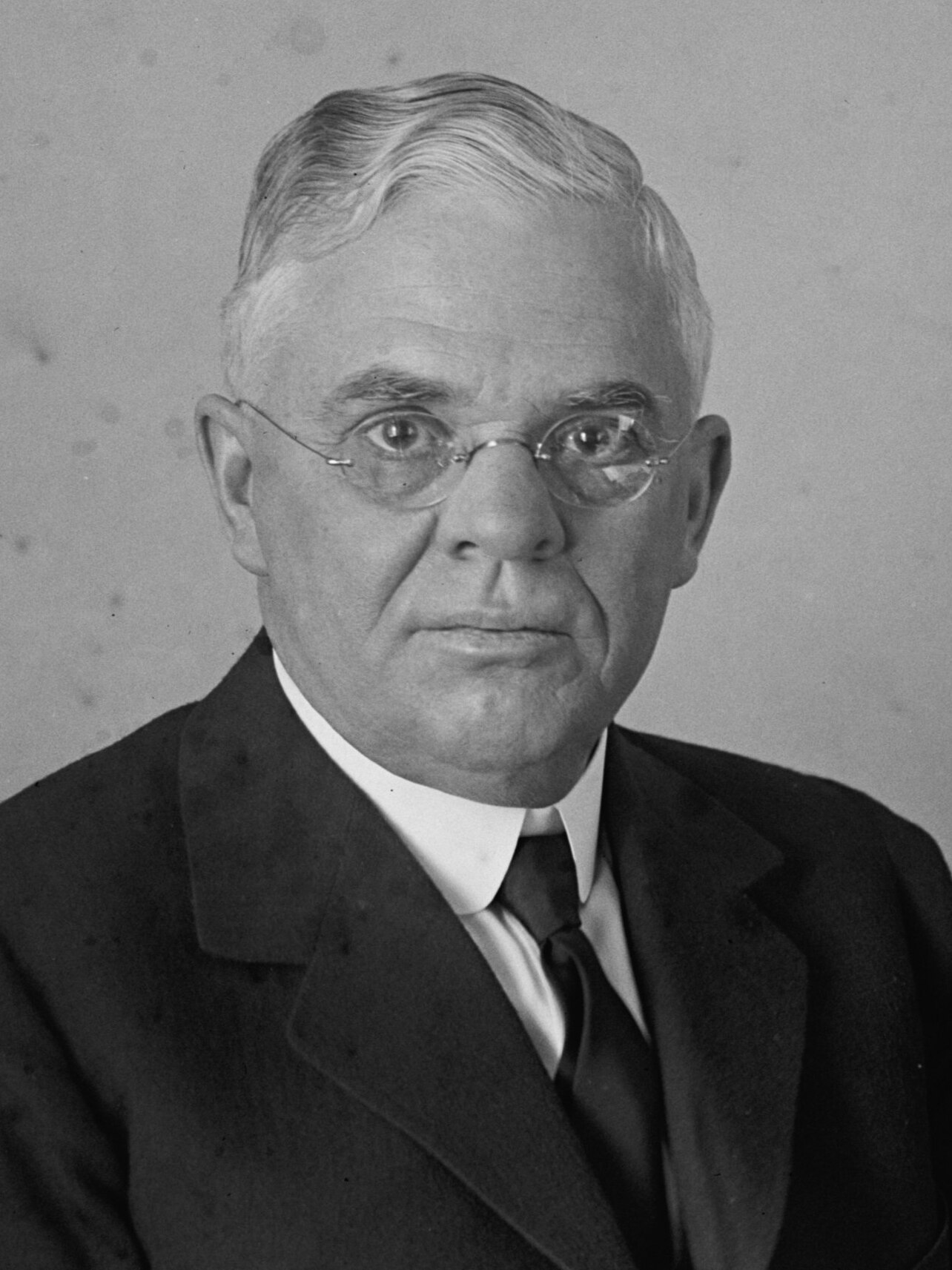
- Deneen c. 1925

United States Senator from Illinois
- In office February 26, 1925 – March 3, 1931
- Preceded by: Medill McCormick
- Succeeded by: J. Hamilton Lewis

23rd Governor of Illinois
- In office January 9, 1905 – February 3, 1913
- Lieutenant: Lawrence Sherman; John G. Oglesby
- Preceded by: Richard Yates Jr.
- Succeeded by: Edward Fitzsimmons Dunne

State's Attorney of Cook County, Illinois
- In office 1896–1904
- Preceded by: Jacob J. Kern
- Succeeded by: John J. Healy

Member of the Illinois House of Representatives from the 2nd District
- In office 1892–1894 Serving with Michael McInerney, Robert McMurdy
- Preceded by: Michael McInerney, William J. Kenney, H. Dorsey Patton
- Succeeded by: Rudolph Mulac, Oscar L. Dudley, Sherman P. Cody

Personal details
- Born: Charles Samuel Deneen; May 4, 1863 Edwardsville, Illinois, US
- Died: February 5, 1940 (aged 76) Chicago, Illinois, US
- Party: Republican
- Spouse: Bina Day Maloney (m. 1891)
- Children: 4
- Relatives: Jason Beghe (great-grandson)
- Education: McKendree College; Union College of Law
- Profession: Attorney

Charles Samuel Deneen (May 4, 1863 – February 5, 1940) was an American lawyer and Republican politician who served as the 23rd governor of Illinois, from 1905 to 1913. He was the first Illinois governor to serve two consecutive terms totalling eight years. He was governor during the infamous Springfield race riot of 1908, which he helped put down. He later served as a U.S. senator from Illinois, from 1925 to 1931. Deneen had previously served as a member of the Illinois House of Representatives from 1892 to 1894. As an attorney, he had been the lead prosecutor in Chicago's infamous Adolph Luetgert murder trial.

== Life and career ==
Deneen was born in Edwardsville, Illinois, to Samuel H. Deneen and Mary Frances Ashley. He was raised in Lebanon, Illinois, and graduated from McKendree College in Lebanon in 1882. He subsequently studied law at McKendree and at Union College of Law, while supporting himself by teaching school. He was admitted to the Illinois bar in 1886. On May 10, 1891, he married fellow Methodist Bina Day Maloney in Princeton, Illinois. The couple had four children; Charles Ashley, Dorothy, Frances, and Bina.

His political career began soon thereafter, with election to the Illinois House of Representatives in 1892. Deneen was Cook County State's Attorney from 1896 to 1904. In 1896, Deneen appointed Ferdinand Lee Barnett as the first black assistant state's attorney in Illinois upon the recommendation of the Cook County Commissioner Edward H. Wright. Deneen and Barnett worked together closely for the next two decades.

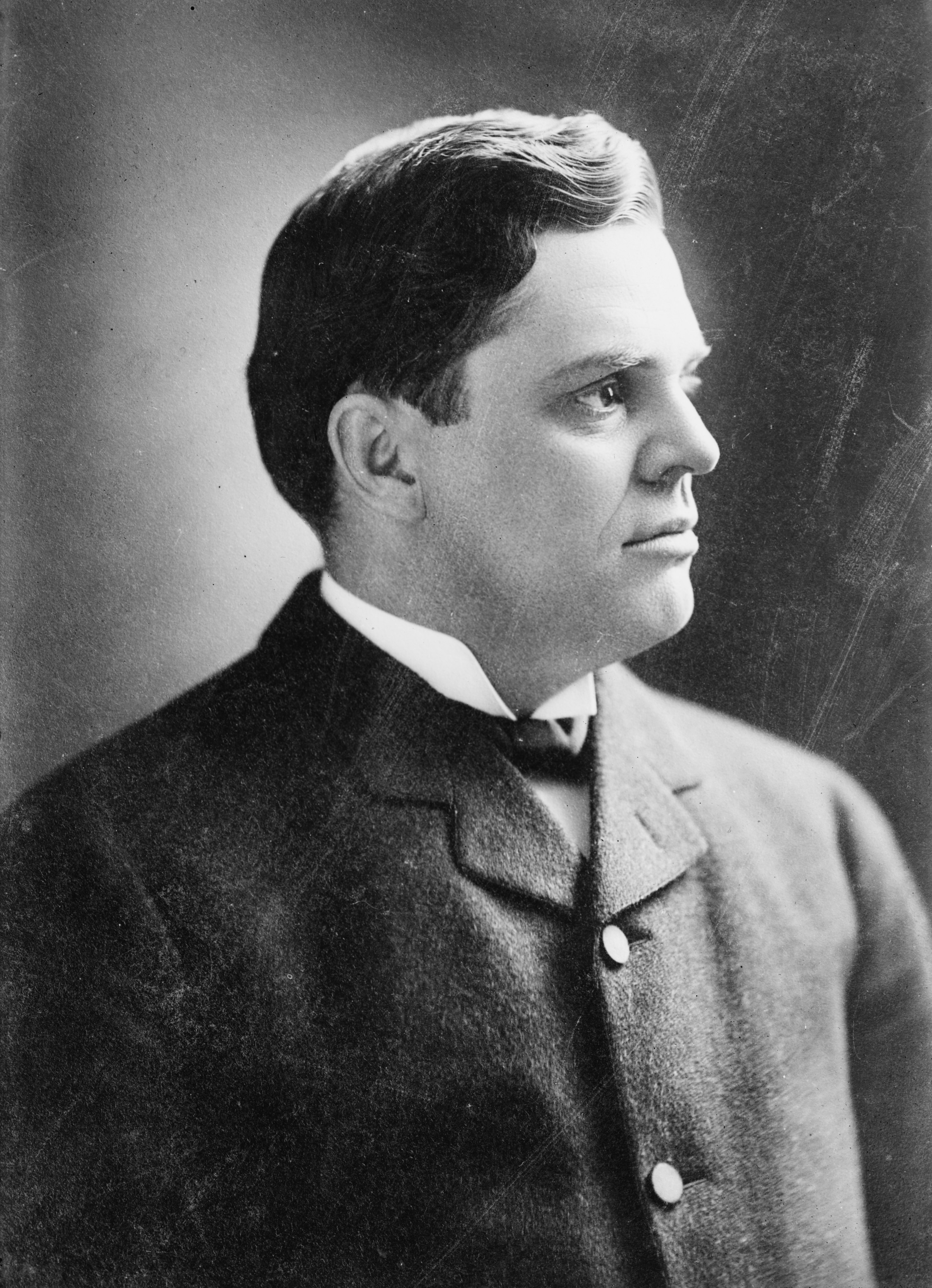
Photograph of Deneen from the George Grantham Bain collection

Deneen became Governor of Illinois in 1905 and supported passage of the Illinois anti-lynching law that year. The state had not had many instances of lynchings, but in 1909 William "Froggie" James was murdered in a spectacle lynching attended by a mob of 10,000 in Cairo, Illinois. The crowd also lynched Henry Salzner, a white man, who had allegedly killed his wife. The governor sent in National Guard troops to suppress violence. Under the 1905 state law, Deneen dismissed Sheriff Frank E. Davis for failing to protect James and Salzner and resisted local efforts to have the officer reinstated.

In 1924, Deneen defeated first-term Senator Medill McCormick in the Republican primary for the United States Senate. Illinois at that time customarily had a downstate seat and a Chicago-area seat, which McCormick held. McCormick committed suicide in early 1925, for which his widow Ruth Hanna McCormick (a future U.S. Representative) blamed Deneen. She defeated him in the 1930 Republican primary, but lost the November election to James Hamilton Lewis. In 1928 Deneen's home was bombed during an outbreak of violence among rival political factions in Chicago in advance of the Pineapple Primary election.

Deneen died in Chicago on February 5, 1940, and was interred there in the Oak Woods Cemetery. The public Deneen School of Excellence was named in his honor. It is located in south Chicago next to the Dan Ryan Expressway, not far from Al Capone's former home on South Prairie.

== Family relations ==
Deneen's daughter Dorothy married Allmand Matteson Blow, who was the son of Jennie Goodell Blow, grandson of Roswell Eaton Goodell, great-grandson of former Illinois governor Joel Aldrich Matteson, nephew-by-marriage of former Colorado governor James Benton Grant, and nephew of former Colorado first lady Mary Goodell Grant.

Deneen's great-grandson is actor Jason Beghe.

Party political offices
Preceded by Richard Yates Jr.	Republican nominee for Governor of Illinois; 1904, 1908, 1912	Succeeded by Frank Orren Lowden
Preceded by Joseph M. McCormick	Republican nominee for U.S. Senator from Illinois (Class 2); 1924	Succeeded by Ruth Hanna McCormick
Political offices
Preceded by Richard Yates	Governor of Illinois; 1905–1913	Succeeded by Edward Fitzsimmons Dunne
U.S. Senate
Preceded by Joseph M. McCormick	U.S. senator (Class 2) from Illinois; 1925–1931; Served alongside: William B. McKinley, Otis F. Glenn	Succeeded by J. Hamilton Lewis
