= Roswell Eaton Goodell =

American politician and businessman

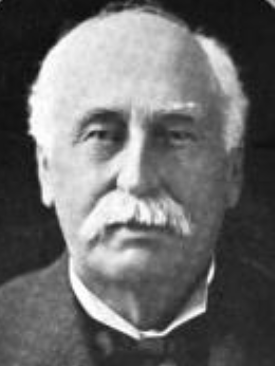

Postmaster of Leadville, Colorado
- In office April 15, 1886 – April 15, 1890
- Succeeded by: William W. Old

Chicago City Marshall
- In office November 22, 1875 – June 5, 1876
- Mayor: Harvey D. Colvin
- Preceded by: George L. Dunlap
- Succeeded by: position abolished

Secretary of the Illinois Canal Commission
- In office 1854 – 1854
- Appointed by: Joel Aldrich Matteson

Secretary of the Illinois Senate
- In office January 3, 1853 – 1854

Sheriff of LaSalle County, Illinois
- In office 1850 – 1852

Personal details
- Born: October 21, 1825 Abington (Pomfret), Connecticut
- Died: October 9, 1903 (aged 77) Denver, Colorado
- Party: Democratic Party
- Spouse: Mary Matteson
- Children: 6, including Jennie and Mary
- Relatives: Joel Aldrich Matteson (father-in-law); James Benton Grant (son-in-law)

Roswell Eaton Goodell (October 21, 1825 – October 9, 1903) was an American politician and businessman who served in several political positions.

Among the government positions Goodell held was Sheriff of LaSalle County, Illinois, Secretary of the Illinois Senate, Secretary of the Illinois Canal Commission, Chicago City Marshall, and Postmaster of Leadville, Colorado. He was also a commissioner of the World's Columbian Exposition.

In the private sector, positions he held included superintendent of the Chicago and Alton Railroad, president of the Fourth National Bank of Chicago, and president of the Denver Stock Exchange.

Goodell was the son-in-law of a Governor of Illinois, Joel Aldrich Matteson, and the father-in-law of a Governor of Colorado, James Benton Grant.

== Biography ==
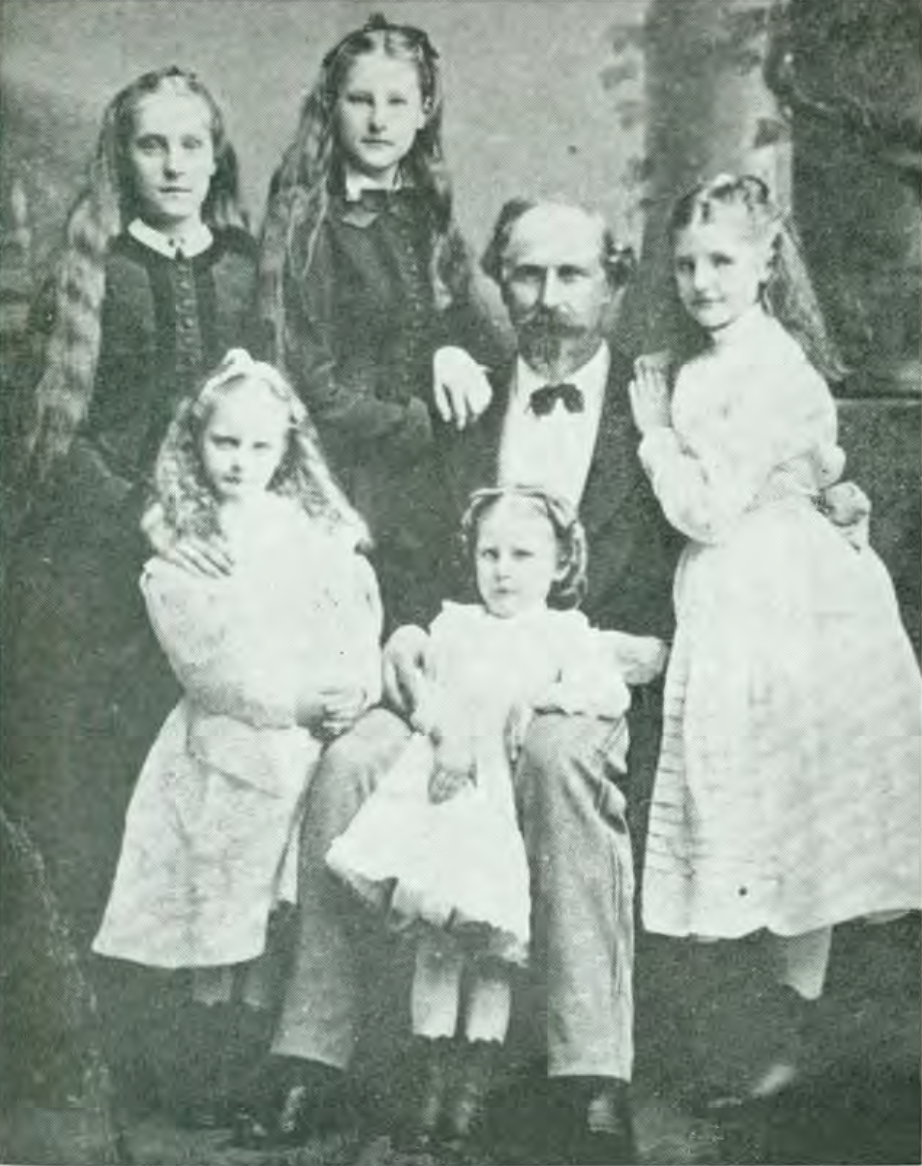
In Paris in 1871, Roswell Eaton Goodell poses with his five daughters L-R (daughters): Back row: Mary, Annie; front row: Clara, Olive, Jennie

Several sources say Goodell was born on October 21, 1825, in Abington, Connecticut; though the LaSalle County, Illinois Genealogy Guild believes he was born in 1827 in Pomfret, Connecticut. He was the son of father Roswell and mother Olive. His father was a farmer and/or an architect. His great-great-great-grandfather had settled in Abington in 1699, and had been one of the early settlers of the area.

In 1834, he moved with his parents to Ottawa, Illinois. They lived near Buffalo Rock. He was educated in public schools in Ottawa. Goodell's father died in 1838. To support the family, until the age of 15, Goodell worked on a farm in the summers.

At the age of fifteen, he became deputy postmaster of Ottawa. He then clerked at the J. Y. Sanger & Company general store in Chicago, before returning to Ottawa and becoming deputy recorder of LaSalle County.

From 1846 to 1847 he served in the Mexican–American War. He served in the company headed by Theophilus Lyle Dickey. He was appointed by John J. Hardin to serve as secretary of the First Regiment of Illinois Volunteers. While stationed at Buena Vista, he was appointed postmaster of the Northern Division of the United States Army. During the Battle of Buena Vista, he closed his post office and joined his regiment to fight on the battlefield.

Politically, Goodell was a Democrat.

In 1848, he served as deputy sheriff of LaSalle County. In 1850 he was elected LaSalle County Sheriff, serving from that year until 1852. His brother-in-law (the husband of his sister) Alson Woodruff had previously held the same position from 1836 through 1838.

Goodell served as the secretary of the Illinois Senate from January 3, 1853, through 1854. His confirmation had been unanimous, 20–0. While working as secretary of the Illinois Senate, he met Mary Jane Matteson, daughter of Governor Joel Aldrich Matteson, who he married on November 1, 1853, in Springfield, Illinois. Mary changed her name to Mary Matteson Goodell after their marriage. He and Mary would have six children. They had five daughters, the second-eldest of which, also named Mary, would be born on July 9, 1857, and would marry James Benton Grant. The other daughters were Annie (who married James Day Whitmore), Jennie (who married Albert Allmand Blow), Clara (who married John Clark Mitchell), Olive (who married Zeph Turner Hill). They also had a son named Roswell Eaton Goodell Jr. (who married the former Mabel Atkinson).

In 1854 he served as the Secretary of the Illinois Canal Commission, after being appointed by Governor Matteson, by now his father-in-law. The task of the commission was to record testimony of canal claims against the state. He worked alongside Abraham Lincoln in this capacity, as Lincoln was commissioner of the Illinois Canal Commission. The two became friends during this experience, despite belonging to different political parties. Their friendship was strong and long lasting.

He moved to Joliet, Illinois. He worked in 1854 as the cashier at Joliet's Merchants' and Drovers' Bank.

He served as treasurer of the Chicago and Alton Railroad from 1854 through 1856, and director from 1856 through 1859. In 1858 he also became the railroad's superintendent, and, in this capacity, he placed the first-ever order for a Pullman Company coach.

In 1858, he was a member of the Illinois Board of Visitors to West Point.

In February 1859, he testified to the Illinois State Senate Finance Committee during its investigation of the Canal Scrip Fraud. Goodell testified on behalf of his father-in-law, ex-Governor Matteson, who had been found to have illegally redeemed thousands of dollars' worth of canal scrip.

In 1861, he organized the Twentieth Regiment Illinois Volunteer Infantry. For the duration of the American Civil War, he worked to fill government contracts for war supplies.

In June 1864, he served as a secretary at the Democratic State Convention in Springfield.

After the end of the Civil War, he lived for a while with his family in Europe to provide his daughters with. finishing education in France and Germany.

He amassed significant wealth from real estate investments.

In 1871, he formally moved to Chicago. He soon lost much of wealth in the financial crash Chicago experienced in the aftermath of the Great Chicago Fire. In Chicago he became prominent in banking. He served as president of the Fourth National Bank of Chicago from 1874 through 1875. From November 22, 1975 through June 5, 1876, he co-headed the Chicago Police Department as Chicago City Marshall. During the Samuel Tilden 1876 presidential campaign, he served as the acting chairman of the Illinois State Democratic Committee. In 1876 and 1877, he was chairman of the Chicago city and Cook County Democratic Party commissions.

In 1878 he moved to Leadville, Colorado, amid a mining rush there. His family joined him in Leadville the following year. In Leadville, he was involved in mining and other investments and was a booster for local improvements. In Colorado, he and his wife were well-involved in social clubs, philanthropy, and politics. He was a prominent figure in Colorado.

On January 19, 1881, his second-eldest daughter Mary married James Benton Grant. Two years later, Grant would be sworn in as Governor of Colorado, making Goodell's daughter, now named Mary Goodell Grant, the First Lady of Colorado. This also meant Goodell was now both a son-in-law of a onetime Illinois governor and father-in-law of a Colorado governor. Goodell's family tree would later gain a connection to a third U.S. governor, as Goodell's grandson Allmand Matteson Blow (son of daughter Jennie) married Dorothy Deneen, daughter of Illinois Governor Charles S. Deneen.

From April 15, 1886 through April 15, 1890, he served as postmaster of Leadville, Colorado.

He was involved in getting the federal government to establish a national fish hatchery at the base of Mount Massive in Leadville, which was established in 1889 by executive order of President Benjamin Harrison. He then ran the fish hatchery.

In 1891, he lost his daughter Olive, who died in Denver.

He was one of the Commissioners from Colorado for Chicago's World's Columbian Exposition from 1890 through 1893. He was nominated for the position by Governor Job Adams Cooper and appointed by President Benjamin Harrison. He was also on the board of managers from Colorado for the World's Columbian Exposition.

He moved to Denver in 1894. He was elected president of the Denver Stock Exchange. While in Denver, he continued to be involved in mining enterprises.

In 1899, his daughter Jennie Blow, while in London, was involved in the successful effort to send the Maine as a hospital ship to serve in the Second Boer War.

Goodell died on October 19, 1903, in Denver of Bright's disease. He was 77 years old at the time of his death, and was less than two weeks shy of what would have been his 78th birthday
