= Tom George =

American politician

Thomas George, M.D.

Member of the Michigan Senate from the 20th district
- In office January 1, 2003 – December 31, 2010
- Preceded by: Dale Shugars
- Succeeded by: Tonya Schuitmaker

Member of the Michigan House of Representatives from the 61st district
- In office January 1, 2001 – December 31, 2002
- Preceded by: Charles R. Perricone
- Succeeded by: Jack Hoogendyk

Personal details
- Born: December 2, 1956 (age 69) Flint, Michigan, U.S.
- Party: Republican
- Spouse: Sandy George
- Children: 3
- Education: University of Michigan
- Profession: Legislator and anesthesiologist

Thomas George (born December 2, 1956) is an American physician and politician from the U.S. state of Michigan. As a Republican member of the Michigan State Senate, he represented Kalamazoo County as well as an eastern portion of Van Buren County. George is a physician and former medical director for Hospice of Greater Kalamazoo. He is currently the co-chairman of the Department of Anesthesiology at Western Michigan University's Homer Stryker School of Medicine.

== Education ==
George studied biology at the University of Michigan College of Literature, Science, and the Arts. He was a recipient of the William J. Branstrom Freshman Prize and was a six-term James B. Angell scholar. He entered the University of Michigan Medical School at the end of his junior year. He completed a postgraduate residency in anesthesiology at the University of Michigan. After his political career, he returned to work as an anesthesiologist in Kalamazoo. He was awarded his bachelor's degree from the University of Michigan in 2010.

== Political career ==
In 2000, George was elected to serve as a member of the Michigan State House of Representatives, representing the 61st district. After serving one term in the state house, George cast his bid for a newly vacant seat in the Michigan Senate in 2002. George was reelected to the senate in 2006, in a campaign against Democratic challenger and term-limited state representative Alexander Lipsey. From 2007-2010 George served as chairman of the Senate Health Policy Committee. While serving in the legislature he authored over forty public acts. In 2010, while attending a commencement address given by President Barack Obama for Kalamazoo Central High School's graduation, a man in the audience collapsed and George initiated CPR. The man was successfully resuscitated and taken to a nearby hospital.

=== 2010 gubernatorial race ===
On January 26, 2009, on the 172nd anniversary of Michigan's statehood, George announced his plans to form a gubernatorial exploratory committee. In 2010 Michigan's current governor Jennifer Granholm was term limited, leaving the seat open to contenders.

George joined Mike Bouchard, the Oakland County Sheriff and former state senator, Businessman Rick Snyder, Congressman Peter Hoekstra and Michigan Attorney General Mike Cox as 2010 Republican gubernatorial candidates. The Republican primary election was won by Snyder.

== Publications ==
George is a past-president of the Historical Society of Michigan and has authored articles on various topics including Abraham Lincoln's 1855 US Senate race, Lincoln's 1856 visit to Kalamazoo, Illinois' Canal Scrip and Macalister-Stebbins Bond Frauds, Kalamazoo history, and the history of the Michigan Republican Party.
