= Uncle Jesse =

Uncle Jesse may refer to:

- Jesse K. Dubois (1811–1876), American politician
- Jesse Duke (Dukes of Hazzard), a fictional character in the television series The Dukes of Hazzard
- Jesse Katsopolis, a fictional character in the television series Full House
