= Jesse K. Dubois =

American politician

7th Illinois Auditor of Public Accounts
- In office January 12, 1857 – December 11, 1864
- Governor: William Henry Bissell; John Wood; Richard Yates
- Preceded by: Thomas Hayes Campbell
- Succeeded by: Orin H. Miner

Member of the Illinois House of Representatives from the Lawrence County district
- In office 1842–1844

Member of the Illinois House of Representatives from the Lawrence County district
- In office 1834–1840

Personal details
- Born: January 14, 1811 Lawrence County, Illinois Territory
- Died: November 22, 1876 (aged 65) Sangamon County, Illinois, U.S.
- Party: Whig (to 1856); Republican (1856–1864)
- Occupation: Merchant

Jesse Kilgore Dubois (sometimes styled DuBois) (January 11, 1811 – November 22, 1876) was an American politician from Illinois. The son of a prominent early Illinois citizen, Dubois was elected to the Illinois House of Representatives while he was attending Indiana College. Nicknamed Uncle Jesse, he served four two-year terms there. An early Republican, Dubois was named the party's first candidate for Auditor of Public Accounts. He was elected in 1856 and served two four-year terms. He was the father of Senator Fred Dubois.

== Biography ==
Jesse Kilgore Dubois was born on January 11, 1811, in Lawrence County, Illinois. The son of Toussaint Dubois, Jesse attended some classes at Indiana College until he was twenty-four. In 1834, he was elected to the Illinois House of Representatives. He was re-elected to the lower house to two-year terms in 1836, 1838, and 1842. In 1841, he was appointed Register of the Land Office of Palestine, Illinois, by William Henry Harrison, but worked only briefly before resigning. He managed stores until 1849, when he was appointed Receiver of Public Moneys of Palestine.

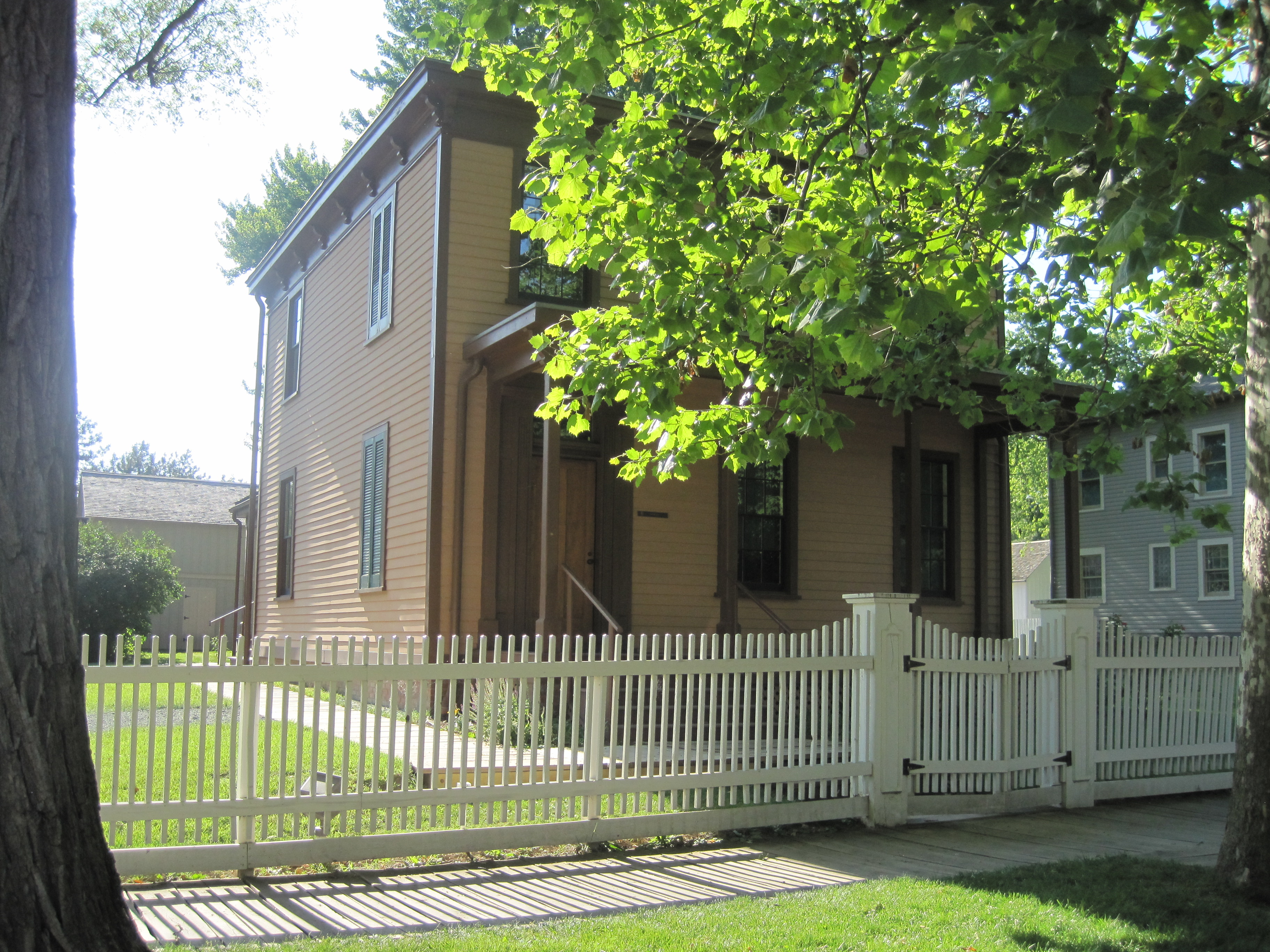
Dubois lived down the road from Abraham Lincoln and his house is today part of the Lincoln Home National Historic Site

Dubois was removed from his office when Franklin Pierce assumed the presidency in 1853. Dubois affiliated himself with the emerging Republican Party and was present at the Bloomington Convention in 1856. There, he was nominated as Auditor of Public Accounts, a state office. He was elected in the subsequent state election, then was re-elected four years later.

During these terms, Dubois moved to Springfield, down the street from Abraham Lincoln.

In 1859, while serving as Auditor, Dubois reported to the legislature the discovery that the previous governor, Joel A. Matteson, had illegally redeemed thousands of dollars' worth of canal scrip. Dubois provided evidence and testimony to the Senate Finance Committee and the Sangamon County grand jury investigating what became known as the Canal Scrip Fraud. As a result of their ongoing investigation, the finance committee later uncovered a second scandal, the Macalister-Stebbins Bond Scandal.

Dubois was a candidate for the Republican nomination in 1868 as governor of Illinois, but the nomination went to John M. Palmer. DuBois was named to the Republican National Executive Committee in 1868. Later that year, he was a delegate to the 1868 Republican National Convention. Dubois was disappointed that he was never able to secure a patronage position from Lincoln for himself or his son-in-law James P. Luse. He lamented that "[Lincoln] has for 30 years past just used me as a plaything to accomplish his own ends."

Dubois died at his home in Sangamon County, Illinois, on November 22, 1876, and was buried in Oak Ridge Cemetery in Springfield. His son Fred became one of the first United States senators from Idaho.

Party political offices
First	Republican nominee for Illinois Auditor of Public Accounts; 1856, 1860	Succeeded by Orlin H. Miner
Political offices
Preceded by Thomas Hayes Campbell	Illinois Auditor of Public Accounts; 1857–1864	Succeeded by Orlin H. Miner
