= Grant–Humphreys Mansion =

Historic house in Colorado, United States

- U.S. National Register of Historic Places
- Colorado State Register of Historic Properties
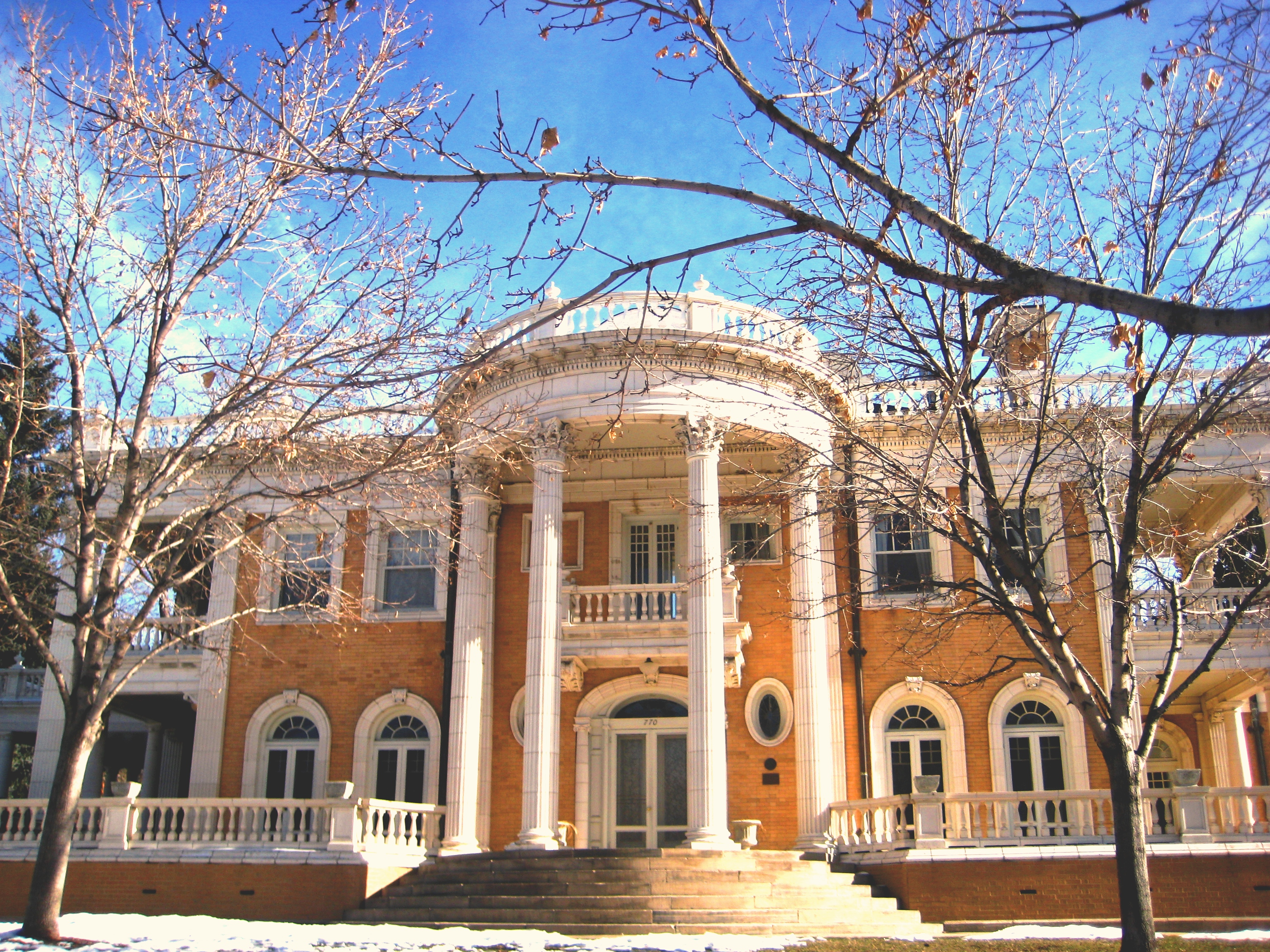
- The Grant–Humphreys Mansion on Pennsylvania Street in Denver, Colorado
- Location: 770 Pennsylvania St; Denver, Colorado
- Coordinates: 39.728102°N 104.980577°W
- Built: 1902
- Architect: Boal and Harnois
- Architectural style: Neoclassical
- NRHP reference No.: 70000160
- CSRHP No.: 5DV.194
- Added to NRHP: September 30, 1970

Grant–Humphreys Mansion in Denver, Colorado, was built in 1902, in the Neoclassical style of architecture by Boal and Harnois, for James Benton Grant following his one term as the third Governor of Colorado (1883–1885). The house has been home to two families.

== Grant history ==
Grant is best known for his role in the ore smelting industry, the first in Leadville, and then in Denver, where the Grant Smelting Company, located two miles northeast of downtown Denver, boasted the tallest furnace stack in the country and the third-largest in the world. Mr. Grant's wife, former Mary Goodell Grant, was prominent in Denver society. She was a member of the Daughters of the American Revolution and helped to found a home for destitute children. Following her husband's death in 1911, she continued to live in the house six more years, selling it in 1917 to Albert E. Humphreys.

== Humphreys history ==
A.E. Humphreys is remembered as "The Wildcatter Deluxe" and the "King of the Wildcatters" for his successful discovery of oil in Wyoming, Oklahoma and Texas. He was also well known for his philanthropic activities, which were shared by his wife, Alice. The couple came to Denver in 1898 with their two sons Ira and Albert E. Jr. Ira married Lucille Pattison, and they lived with the senior Humphreys in the house until the deaths of his parents.

Ira was the mechanical genius of the family, while A.E. Jr. enjoyed the managerial side of the family oil business. Both young men were fascinated with airplanes and opened Denver's first commercial airport in 1918 at 26th Avenue and Oneida Street in North Park Hill, ten years prior to the Denver Municipal Airport that was eventually to become Stapleton International Airport. In 1919, Ira Boyd "Bumps" Humphreys formed the Curtiss-Humphreys Airplane Company. In 1941, Ira invented the Humphreys Spiral Concentrator, which was used extensively in the mining industry for the separation of minerals and heavy metals in low grade ores. And, in 1969, Ira and Albert were both inducted into the Colorado Aviation Hall of Fame, which is located in the Colorado Aviation Historical Society's Heritage Hall at the Wings Over the Rockies Air and Space Museum, Denver, Colorado.

== Curatorship ==
The Colorado Historical Society took possession of the mansion, a bequest of the late Ira Boyd Humphreys, in 1976. The walls were originally covered in damask which fell into disrepair and has since been removed.
