= James Benton Grant =

American politician (1848–1911)

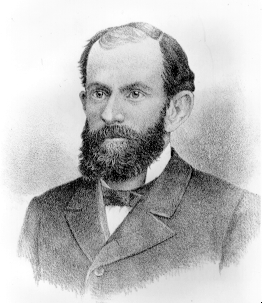
- Grant, circa 1885

3rd Governor of Colorado
- In office January 9, 1883 – January 13, 1885
- Lieutenant: William H. Meyer
- Preceded by: Frederick W. Pitkin
- Succeeded by: Benjamin H. Eaton

President of the Denver Board of Education
- In office 1892–1897

Personal details
- Born: January 2, 1848 Russell County, Alabama, U.S.
- Died: November 1, 1911 (aged 63) Excelsior Springs, Missouri, U.S.
- Resting place: Fairmount Cemetery in Denver, Colorado
- Party: Democratic
- Spouse: Mary Matteson Goodell (m. 1881)
- Children: 2
- Relatives: Jennie Goodell Blow (sister-in-law); Roswell Eaton Goodell (father-in-law)
- Education: Iowa State University, Cornell University, Freiberg University of Mining
- Profession: Mining magnate

James Benton Grant (January 2, 1848 – November 1, 1911) was an American mining magnate, mining engineer, Confederate Army soldier who served as the third governor of Colorado from 1883 to 1885 before dying in 1911.

== Early life, American Civil War, and education ==
Grant was born on January 2, 1848, on a plantation in Russell County, Alabama. Prior to the American Civil War, Grant's family owned a plantation. At the outbreak of the American Civil War, Grant enlisted as a private in the 20th Alabama Light Artillery regiment in the Confederate Army.

While his immediate family was financially destroyed after the American Civil War, a wealthy uncle of Grant's who lived in Davenport, Iowa, paid for Grant's secondary education. After the war, Grant attended what is now Iowa State University for two years and then transferred to Cornell University, which he attended from 1873 to 1874. He then attended Germany's Freiberg University of Mining, which was, at the time, one of the leading schools in the world for mineral engineering. There, he studied metallurgy. Grant then worked in the mines of Austria to gain practical mining experience before returning to the United States two years later.

== Colorado life ==
=== Early years ===
Returning to the United States, he first settled briefly in the Colorado town of Central City. In either 1877 or 1878, Grant moved to the newly founded Colorado town of Leadville. He started his career as a metallurgic engineer and smelting magnate there. In Leadville, Grant constructed the 353 feet (108 m) tall Grant Smelter stack, which was at the time of its completion the third largest smelter in the world and the tallest in the United States. Grant was also involved in the construction of the 5 miles (8.0 km) long Yak Tunnel, which facilitated deep mining.

In Leadville, Grant married into the Goodell family, esteemed in Colorado, by marrying the young Mary Goodell, the daughter of Roswell Eaton Goodell and granddaughter of former Illinois governor Joel Aldrich Matteson. The two wed in Leadville's newly built St. George's Episcopal Church. The ceremony was presided over by James J. Mackay. The wedding was a major social event in the community, and was the newly opened church's first-ever wedding ceremony. After the wedding ceremony, a small reception was held at her family's home. The following day, a larger reception took place at Denver's Windsor Hotel. The couple left for their honeymoon in San Francisco soon after.

After the Grant Smelter was lost in a fire in 1882, Grant and his wife relocated to Denver, where Grant relocated his business and built a new smelter under the name Omaha and Grant. It was believed to the largest smelter in the world at the time. Its 353 feet (108 m) tall smokestack, completed in 1892, stood for decades as one of the most recognizable landmarks in Denver's skyline until its 1950 demolition. The site of this smelter was near where the Denver Coliseum sits today. Denver had economic and rail transportation advantages. The Grants’ move to Denver likely also was related to James' ambitions to run for governor of Colorado.

=== Governorship ===
Grant ran as the Democratic Party nominee in the 1882 Colorado gubernatorial election. Grant was never very interested in politics. However, he was urged by Democrats to run, and agreed to. At the time, Colorado was seen as a Republican Party stronghold due to the fact that most individuals that had moved there were northerners who had supported the Union Army's cause in the American Civil War. This made Grant an underdog in the election. Grant benefited from a major divide that year in the state’s Republican Party, as well as his marriage into a prominent family and his ever-increasing notability as a successful smelting businessman. He won on the election, becoming the first Democrat to win a Colorado gubernatorial election in the state's young history.

On January 9, 1883, Grant was inaugurated as governor. He was the state's first Democratic Party governor. Grant, having been only a week past his 35th birthday at the time of his inauguration, remains the youngest governor to serve after Colorado's statehood, and the second-youngest ever governor of Colorado, after only territorial governor Edward McCook. As governor, he worked to expand the state's mining industry and its commerce. Many mines opened in the state's southwestern portion during his governorship, especially in the "Gunnison Country" area that was formerly a part of the Ute Indian reservation. Mining growth and other factors led to a prosperous economy during his governorship. Grant also proposed the bill which authorized the construction of the Colorado State Capitol. Grant also succeeded in achieving his priority of extending the length of the legislative session of Colorado s state legislature.

During his governorship, Grant and his wife had their first child, son Lester Eames, on March 21, 1884.

Grant, still not very interested in politics, declined to seek reelection in the 1884 Colorado gubernatorial election.

=== Post-governorship ===
Grant and his wife remained major society figures after he left office as governor, and he remained a major industry figure. Grant became a major figure in finance and industry of the Western United States. Grant also served eight years as the president of the Denver Board of Education from 1892 to 1897. He also helped organize the creation of the Denver National Bank and served tenures as a member of the board of directors and as its vice-president. and was involved in the founding of the Colorado Women’s College. He was involved in organizing the Colorado Scientific Society.

On May 6, 1888, the Grants had their second and final child, son James Jr.

By 1900, Grant's Denver smelter had produced $130 million of gold, silver, and lead. In 1899, Grant's smelting business interests were merged with the newly founded American Smelting and Refining Company. Grant continued to earn profits from his investment in mining and ore-processing facilities across Colorado.

In 1902, the Grants completed construction on and moved into an elaborate house now known as the Grant-Humphreys Mansion. While his wife would entertain extensively at the residence, Grant himself receded from business and the social scene after his heart attack that year, instead spending much of the rest of his life concentrating on pleasurable outdoor activities such as the ranching on his ranch in Littleton, Colorado, as well as hunting and fishing.

Grant died of heart disease on November 1, 1911, in Excelsior Springs, Missouri. He is buried at Denver's Fairmount Cemetery, and his wife was later buried beside him after her 1941 death.

== See also ==
- Politics of the United States
- Politics of Colorado

Party political offices
Preceded by John S. Hough	Democratic nominee for Governor of Colorado; 1882	Succeeded by Alva Adams
Political offices
Preceded by Frederick Walker Pitkin	Governor of Colorado; 1883–1885	Succeeded by Benjamin Harrison Eaton
