= The Lost Chord =

1877 song by Arthur Sullivan

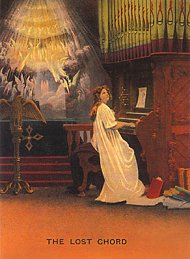
Victorian postcard

"The Lost Chord" is a song set in 1877 by Arthur Sullivan to a poem by Adelaide Anne Procter called "A Lost Chord", published in 1860 in The English Woman's Journal. Sullivan composed the song at the bedside of his brother Fred during Fred's last illness in Fulham, West London, England. The manuscript is dated 13 January 1877; Fred Sullivan died five days later.

The song was immediately successful and became particularly associated with American contralto Antoinette Sterling, with Sullivan's close friend and mistress, Fanny Ronalds, and with British contralto Clara Butt. Sullivan was proud of the song and later noted: "I have composed much music since then, but have never written a second Lost Chord."

Many singers have recorded the song, including Enrico Caruso, who sang it at the Metropolitan Opera House on 29 April 1912 at a benefit concert for families of victims of the Titanic disaster. The piece has endured as one of Sullivan's best-known songs, and the setting is still performed today.

== Background ==
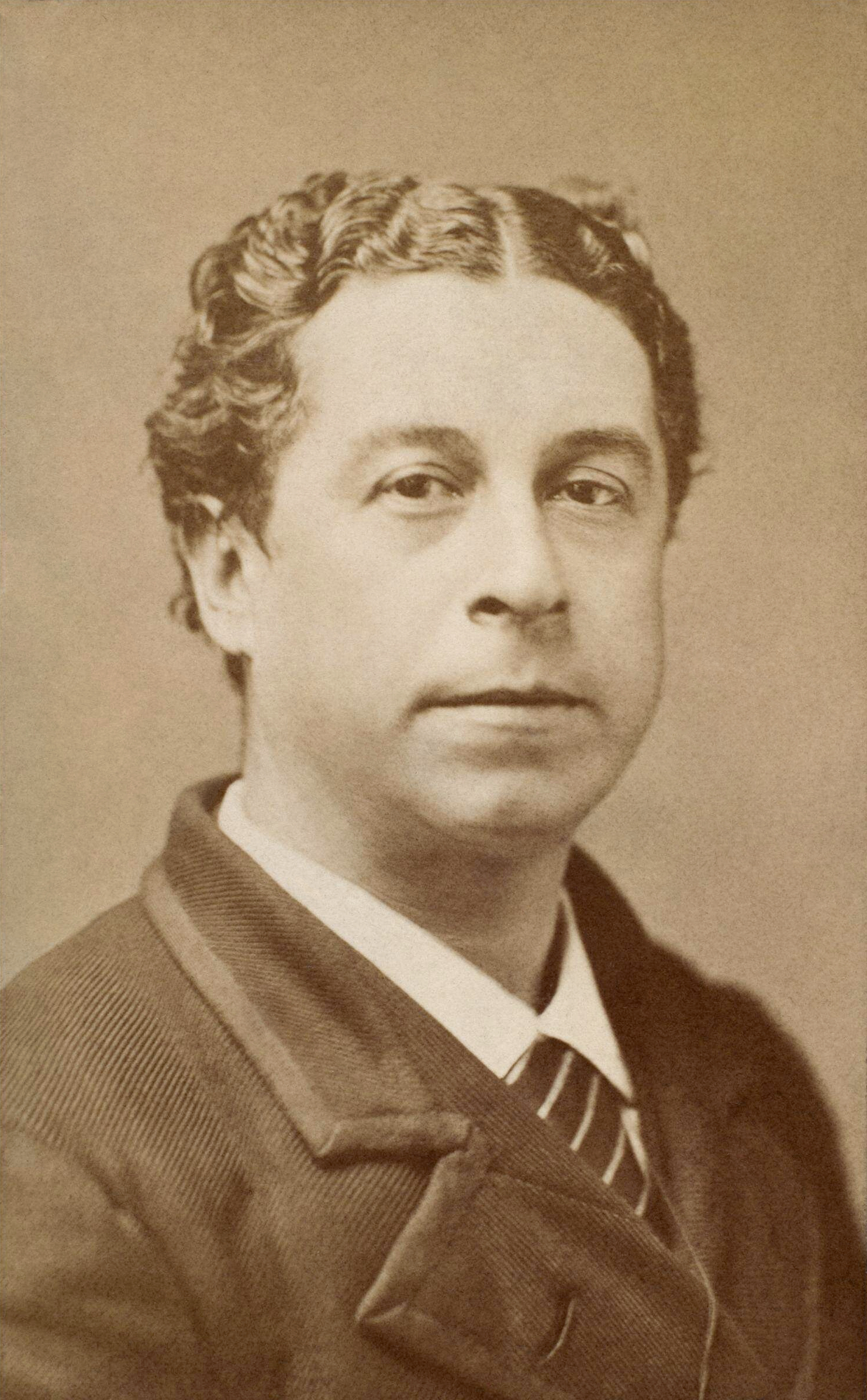
The composer's brother, Fred Sullivan

In 1877, Arthur Sullivan was already Britain's foremost composer, having produced such critically praised pieces as his Irish Symphony, his Overture di Ballo, many hymns and songs, such as "Onward, Christian Soldiers", and the popular short operas Cox and Box and Trial by Jury. Adelaide Anne Procter was an extremely popular poet in Britain, second in fame only to Alfred Lord Tennyson. On the early published sheet music for the song, Procter's name is written in larger letters than Sullivan's. Sullivan's father's death had inspired him to write his Overture In C (In Memoriam) over a dozen years earlier.

The composer's brother, Fred Sullivan, was an actor who appeared mostly in operettas and comic operas. The playwright F. C. Burnand wrote of Fred: "As he was the most absurd person, so was he the very kindliest. The brothers were devoted to each other, but Arthur went up, and poor little Fred went under." Fred played roles in several of his brother's operas: Cox and Box, Thespis, The Contrabandista and Trial by Jury. He fell ill in 1876 and died in January 1877.

During Fred's final illness, Arthur visited his brother frequently at his home on King's Road in Fulham, London. The composer had tried to set Procter's poem to music five years previously but had not been satisfied by the effort. As he had been inspired by his grief at the death of their father, he was again inspired to compose by his brother's decline. At Fred's bedside, he sketched out the music to The Lost Chord, and the manuscript is dated 13 January 1877, five days before Fred's death.

Although not written for sale, the song became the biggest commercial success of any British or American song of the 1870s and 1880s. The American contralto Antoinette Sterling premiered the piece on 31 January 1877 at a Boosey concert, and she became one of its leading proponents, as did Sullivan's close friend and sometime mistress, Fanny Ronalds, who often sang it at society functions. Dame Clara Butt recorded the song several times, and many famous singers recorded it, including Enrico Caruso in 1912. A copy of the music was buried with Ronalds, who bequeathed the manuscript to Butt in 1914. Butt's husband, baritone Kennerley Rumford, gave the manuscript to the Worshipful Company of Musicians in 1950.

Musicologist Derek B. Scott offers this analysis of the composition:

The Lost Chord
1913 recording sung by Reed Miller

Sullivan's setting is structurally sophisticated in its treatment of Procter's verses, and offers a contrast to ... simple strophic setting.... This demonstrates the variety of forms to be found in drawing-room ballads before there were moves toward greater homogeneity in the 1880s.... For the most part, the song steers clear of the predictable.... There are some delightful surprises, such as the sudden coloring of the harmony with the old church Mixolydian mode as the singer recounts the striking of the mysterious chord. Sullivan shows a thorough understanding of the possibilities of the piano, ranging widely across its compass and making powerful dynamic and textural contrasts. He also does a fine job of imitating an organ style in the introduction. Sullivan's compositional skill where words are concerned is evident in the way he treats the quatrains of Procter's poem ... creating a subtle musical structure that avoids an obviously sectional character, despite the poem's hymn-like form.

== 1888 recording for Edison ==
1888 recording of Arthur Sullivan's "The Lost Chord"
Recorded by George Gouraud, and played at the 14 August 1888 press conference that introduced the phonograph to London.

In 1888, Thomas Edison sent his "Perfected" Phonograph to Mr. George Gouraud in London, England, and on 14 August 1888, Gouraud introduced the phonograph to London in a press conference, including the playing of a piano and cornet recording of Sullivan's "The Lost Chord", one of the first recordings of music ever made.

A series of parties followed, introducing the phonograph to members of society at the so-called "Little Menlo" in London. Sullivan was invited to one of these on 5 October 1888. After dinner, he recorded a speech to be sent to Thomas Edison, saying, in part:

I can only say that I am astonished and somewhat terrified at the result of this evening's experiments: astonished at the wonderful power you have developed, and terrified at the thought that so much hideous and bad music may be put on record forever. But all the same I think it is the most wonderful thing that I have ever experienced, and I congratulate you with all my heart on this wonderful discovery.

These recordings were discovered in the Edison Library in New Jersey in the 1950s.

== Text of Sullivan's setting ==
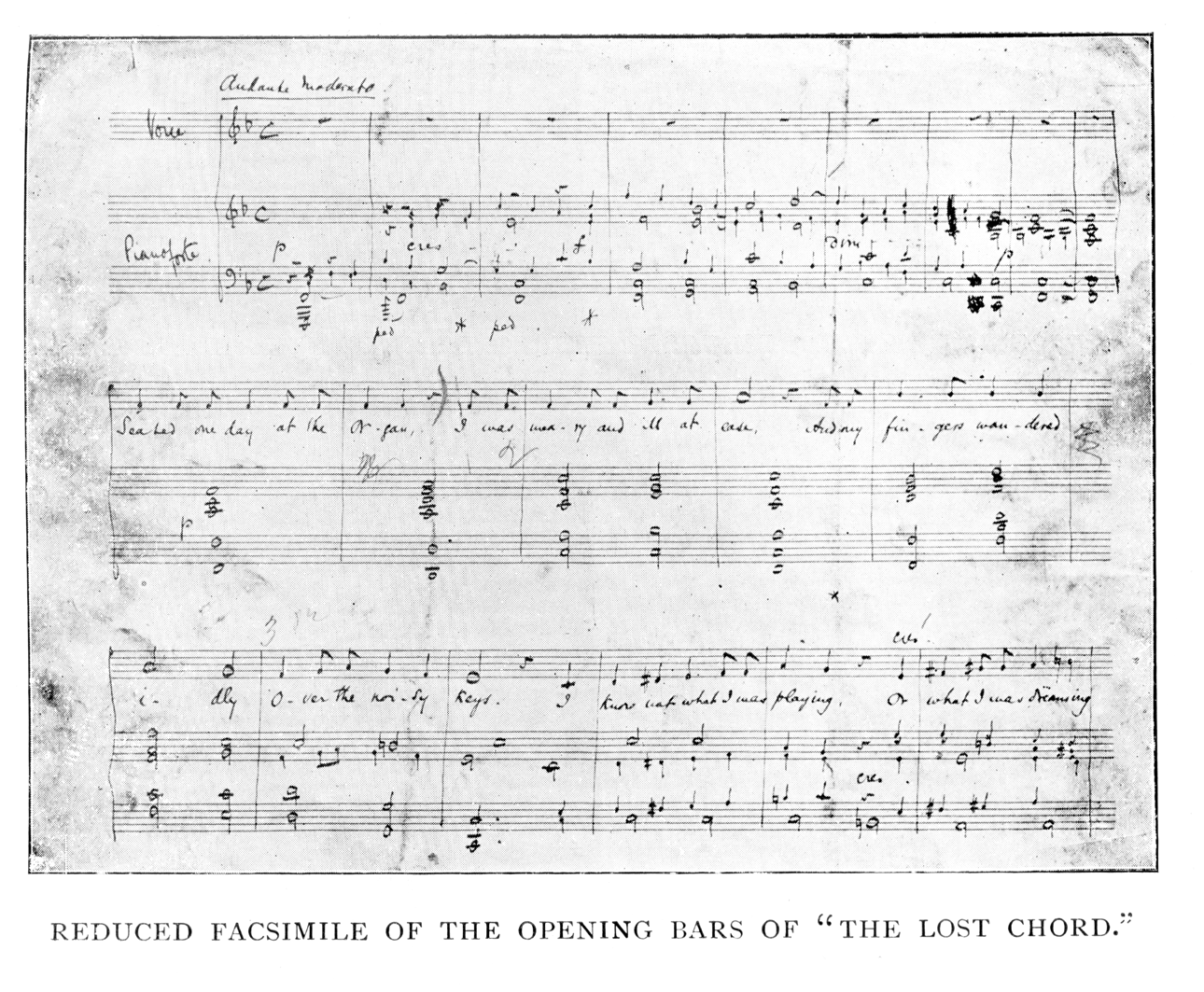
The opening bars of "The Lost Chord"; facsimile of Sullivan's manuscript

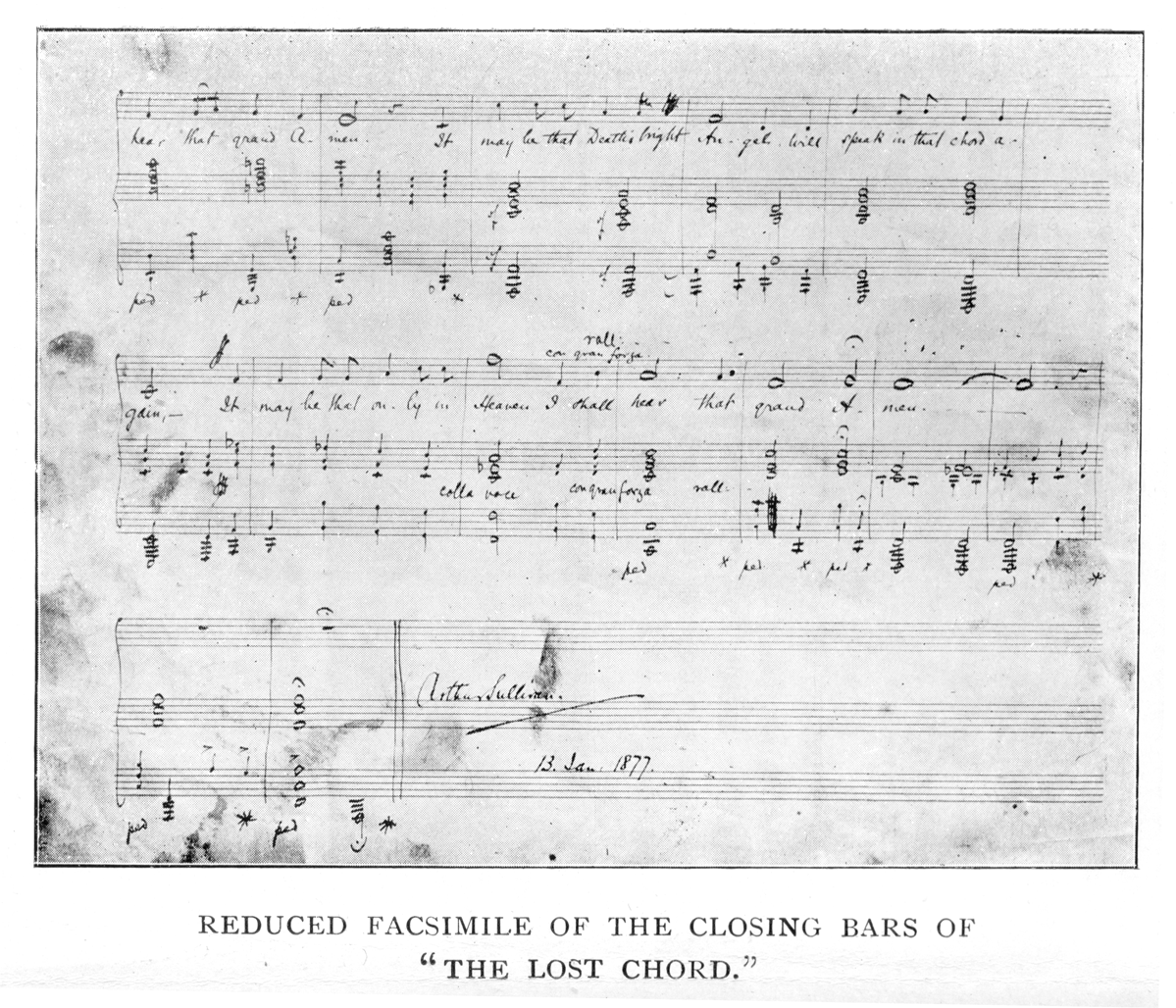
The closing bars, with Sullivan's signature and the date "13 Jan. 1877"

The Lost Chord
Seated one day at the organ,
I was weary and ill at ease,
And my fingers wandered idly
Over the noisy keys.

I know not what I was playing,
Or what I was dreaming then;
But I struck one chord of music,
Like the sound of a great Amen.

It flooded the crimson twilight,
Like the close of an angel's psalm,
And it lay on my fevered spirit
With a touch of infinite calm.

It quieted pain and sorrow,
Like love overcoming strife;
It seemed the harmonious echo
From our discordant life.

It linked all perplexèd meanings
Into one perfect peace,
And trembled away into silence
As if it were loth to cease.

I have sought, but I seek it vainly,
That one lost chord divine,
Which came from the soul of the organ,
And entered into mine.

It may be that death's bright angel
Will speak in that chord again,
It may be that only in Heav'n
I shall hear that grand Amen.

== Cultural influence ==
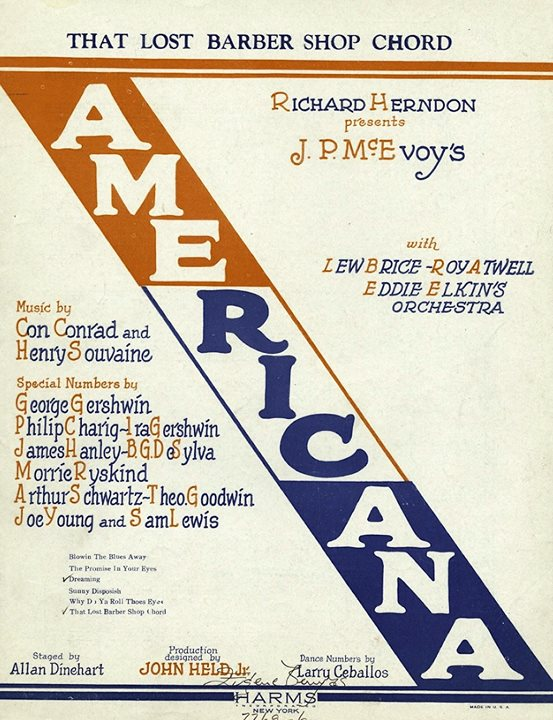
Song cover for "That Lost Barber Shop Chord"

=== In film and television ===
There have been at least six films titled The Lost Chord, as well as one titled The Trail of the Lost Chord. In the 1999 film Topsy-Turvy, a scene depicts Fanny Ronalds (played by Eleanor David) facetiously introducing it as "a new composition" at an 1884 party at her house; she then sings it with Sullivan (Allan Corduner) at the piano and Walter Simmonds (Matthew Mills) at the harmonium.

The Strangers TV series had an episode called "The Lost Chord".

=== Music ===
Jimmy Durante recorded a humorous song called "I'm the Guy Who Found the Lost Chord", which he also sings in the 1947 film This Time for Keeps. George and Ira Gershwin wrote a song called "That Lost Barber Shop Chord", which was included in their 1926 revue Americana. The Moody Blues produced an album called In Search of the Lost Chord in 1968. According to keyboardist Mike Pinder, the title was inspired by the Durante song.

=== Literature and other ===
The novel Bad Wisdom by Bill Drummond and Mark Manning concerns their trip to the North Pole with an icon of Elvis to search for the Lost Chord. Edith Wharton's novel Ethan Frome contains references to the song. In Isaac Asimov's Black Widowers story "The Quiet Place" (Ellery Queen's Mystery Magazine, March 1988), the traditional "Guest" of the Black Widowers hums this tune all through a dinner. Caryl Brahms wrote a 1975 book called Gilbert and Sullivan: Lost Chords and Discords.
