= Mary Goodell Grant =

Socialite from Colorado, USA (1857–1941)

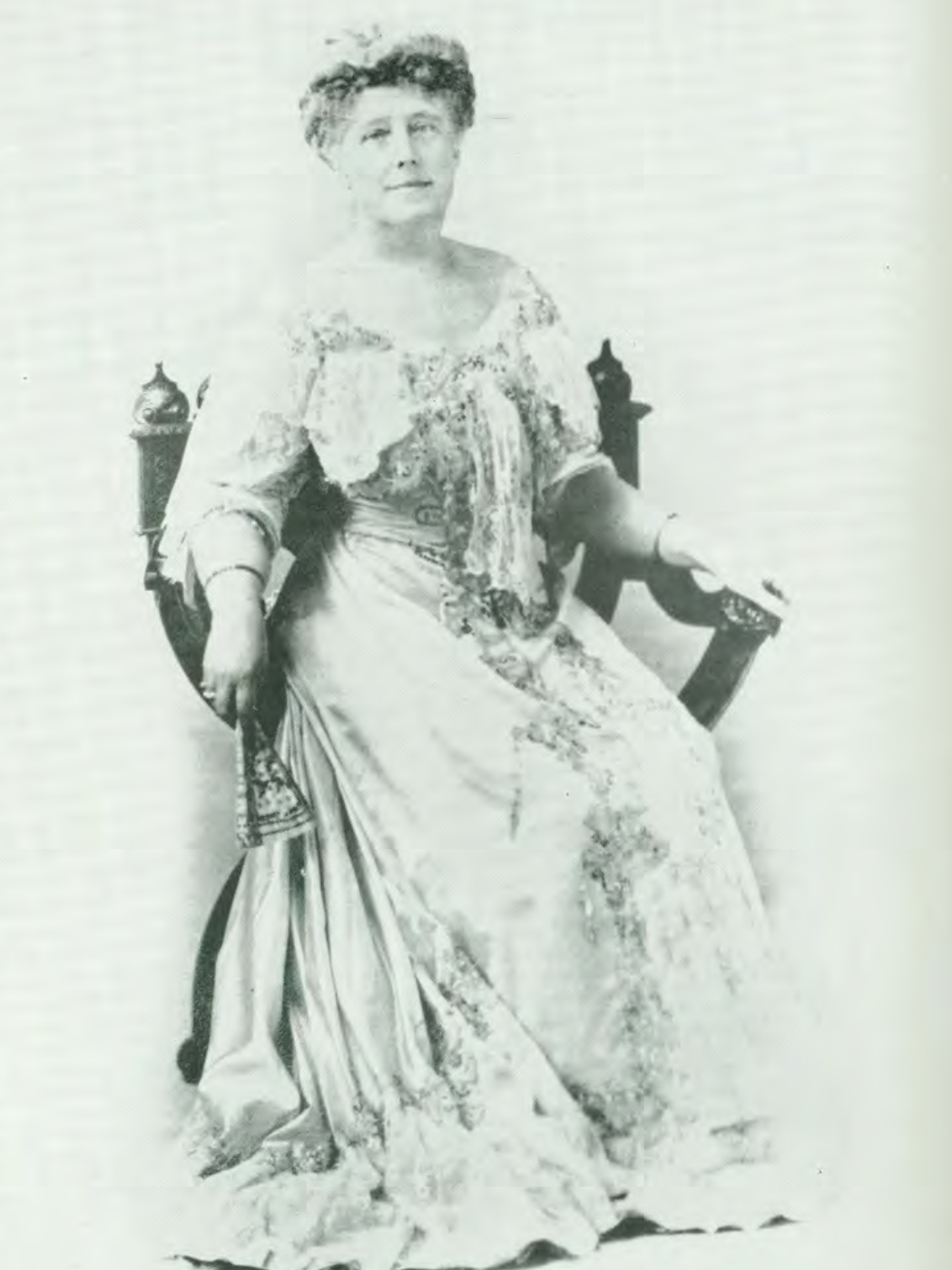

3rd First Lady of Colorado
- In office January 9, 1883 – January 13, 1885
- Governor: James Benton Grant
- Preceded by: Fidelia James Pitkin
- Succeeded by: Rebecca Eaton

Personal details
- Born: Mary Matteson Goodell; July 9, 1857 Joliet, Illinois
- Died: April 12, 1941 (aged 83) Denver, Colorado
- Resting place: Fairmount Cemetery, Denver
- Spouse: James Benton Grant (m. 1881; died 1911)
- Children: 2
- Parents: Roswell Eaton Goodell (father); Mary Jane Goodell (mother)
- Relatives: Jennie Goodell Blow (sister); Joel Aldrich Matteson (grandfather)

Mary Goodell Grant (née Mary Matteson Goodell; July 9, 1857 – April 12, 1941) was a prominent socialite and local Denver civic leader who was also the first lady of Colorado during the Colorado governorship of her husband James Benton Grant.

== Early life ==
Born Mary Matteson Goodell in Joliet, Illinois, on July 9, 1857, she was the second-eldest of five daughters born to Roswell Eaton Goodell and Mary Matteson Goodell (née Mary Jane Goodell). In addition to her sisters, Annie, Clara, Olive, and Jennie, her parents also had a son named Roswell Eaton Goodell Jr. Her maternal grandfather, Joel Aldrich Matteson, was a former governor of Illinois, who had just ended his tenure as governor months before her birth. Her maternal ancestry can be traced back to Mayflower pilgrims John Alden and Priscilla Alden, who were her great-great-great grandparents through her maternal grandmother Mary Fish Matteson.

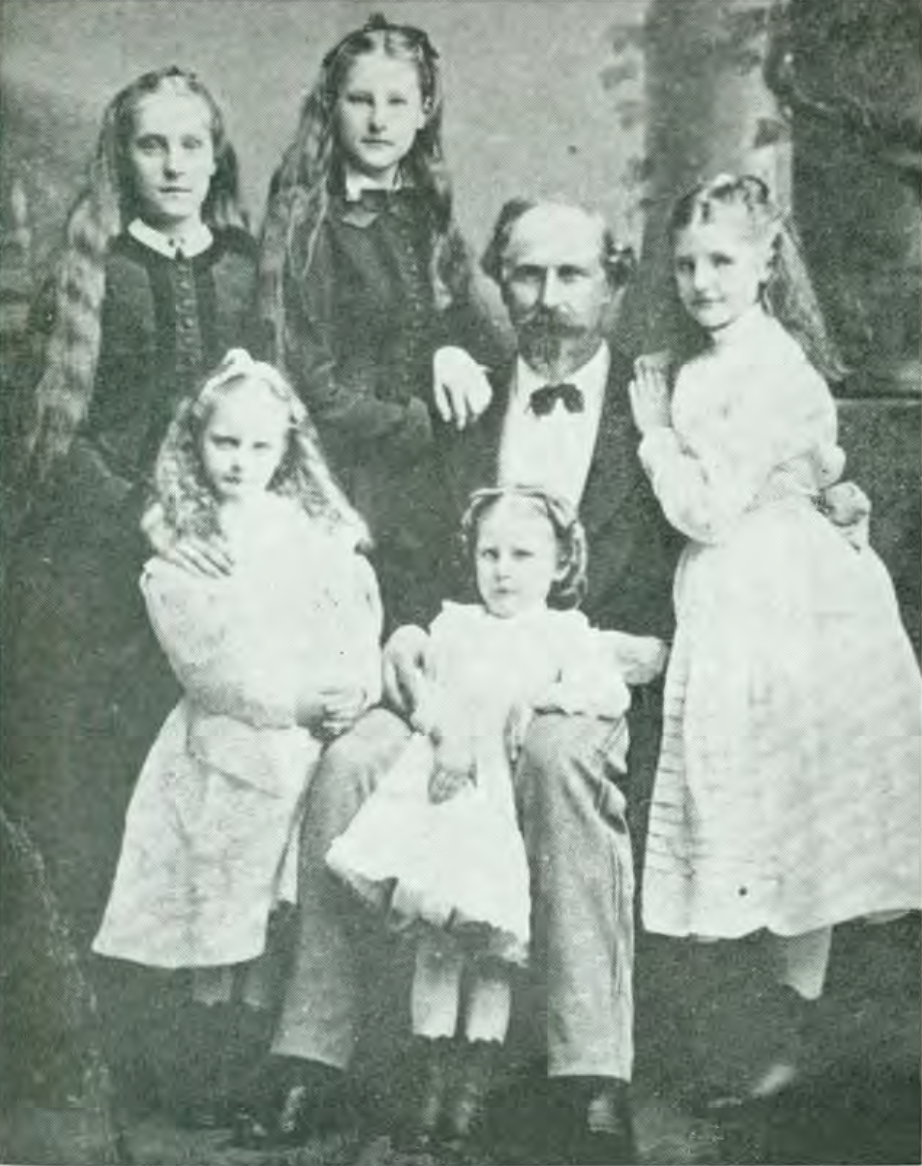
In Paris in 1871, Roswell Eaton Goodell poses with his five daughters L-R (daughters): Back row: Mary, Annie; front row: Clara, Olive, Jennie

Her family were Protestants. While their personal home was in Joliet at this time, during part of her childhood, she and her family appear to have lived in the Springfield, Illinois, of her grandfather Joel Alrich Matteson, particularly in the period after the American Civil War. From 1870 until 1873, she and her family resided abroad in France and Dresden, Germany. When they returned in the United States, they moved to Chicago, Illinois.

Despite all being Protestants, she and her sisters all attended Washington, D.C.'s Georgetown Academy of the Visitation for part of their education, with Mary attending for the school years of 1873 through 1877.

== Adult life ==
In 1878, after the Chicago Fire of 1871 and the panic of 1873 likely damaged her family's fortune, the family moved westward to the state of Colorado, where they settled in mining town of Leadville, which was founded as a town that year and not incorporated until the following year. To arrive in Leadville, the family had to travel from Denver by either stagecoach or covered wagon, as this was the only way to travel to the town until the 1880 opening of the Rio Grande Railroad. She, her, mother and her sisters moved with her father into a log house that he had prepared for them ahead of their arrival.

The Goodells established themselves as a prominent Colorado family. In Leadville, she and her four sisters attracted the attention of many eligible suiters. In their adulthood, she and her sisters, who were often collectively referred to as the "famous Goodell sisters", were notable figures in Colorado's social scene. They are considered to have been civic leaders in their own rights and each married a man of prominent stature. The sisters also received a reputation of beauty and fashionable dress.

Mary attracted the interest of James Benton Grant, a university-educated metallurgical engineer who owned and operated the Grant Smelter. Grant had also arrived in the Leadville in the year 1878. In 1881, the two married, and she assumed the marital name Mary Goodell Grant. Their wedding was held in Leadville's St. George's Episcopal Church, and was presided over by James J. Mackay. The wedding was a major social event in the community, and was the newly-opened church's first-ever wedding ceremony. After the wedding ceremony, a small reception was held at her family's home. The following day, a larger reception took place at Denver's Windsor Hotel. The couple left for their honeymoon in San Francisco soon after.

After the Grant Smelter was lost in a fire in 1882, the couple relocated to Denver, where James Barton Grant relocated his business and built a new smelter under the name Omaha and Grant. The Grants' move to Denver likely also was related to James' ambitions to run for governor of Colorado. James Benton Grant ran and won that year's gubernatorial election. After her husband's gubernatorial inauguration on January 9, 1882, at the age of twenty-five and only two years into her marriage, Grant became the first lady of the state of Colorado.

During her time as first lady, Grant established herself in Denver's social scene. The gubernatorial inaugural gala she hosted at her newly-built personal residence on February 6, 1883 served as an effective social debut for her in Denver's social scene. She would go on to be a civic leader in the city for the next five decades.

Before her husband left the governorship, Grant gave birth to her first son, Lester Eames, on March 21, 1884. She later gave birth to a second son and final child, James Benton Jr., on May 6, 1888. Lester Eames would grow up to work as an engineer, and would spend a significant part of his adulthood living outside of the United States before returning to the country. James Jr. (who would die on May 20, 1947) worked as a lawyer.

In the 1880s, the Grants broke ground on a new grand residence in Denver. The house's completion was delayed due financial uncertainty in Denver in an era with the "silver question" concerns and the panic of 1893. The house would not be finished until 1902. The house, today known as the Grant–Humphreys Mansion, became dubbed the "White House of Denver", "Mrs. Grant's House Beautiful", and "A Glimpse into Fairyland". The large house was designed with ample space to entertain guests for formal events. At the time that the house was finished, Grant, at the age of forty-five, was well-reputed by Denver's social scene to be a beautiful, witty, kind, fashionably dressed, and well mannered hostess. She was regarded to have a skill at socializing with prominent individuals. Her husband was established as a prominent figure in the Western United States' industry and finance. However, after suffering a heart attack in 1902, he scaled-back his involvement in business and spent much of his time afterwards enjoying outdoor activities. Meanwhile, Mrs. Grant was an active hostess to members of the Denver social scene. Their home became a well-established location for social events. Contributing to their success as hosts was the skilled cooking of their cook, housekeeper, and close friend Nellie Murphy, who had been a friend of James Benton Grant even previous to the couple's marriage.

In 1894, Grant played a key role in founding the Woman's Club of Denver, of which she was made a charter member. The club was modeled after the Chicago Woman's Club. Grant's personality, her skill at organizing and administrating, and her perfectionist nature had led leading women of Denver to elevate her as a key representative on behalf of the interests of the city's women. She was a charter member of the National Society of Colonial Dames of America in the State of Colorado, which was founded and incorporated in 1896. She also became a charter member of the Colorado Chapter of the Daughters of the American Revolution when it was founded in 1904. From 1904 to 1909, she served as the inaugural regent for the chapter. She also served as vice-president-general of the national organization of Daughters of the American Revolution from 1917 until 1920. She also held membership in Society of Mayflower Descendants, Daughters of the Founders and Patriots of America, Descendants of Colonial Governors, and Daughters of 1812.

Grant was widowed on November 1, 1911. She continued to live in the oppulent house they had built until selling it in 1917 to Albert E. Humphreys and his wife, Alice Boyd. Grant remained in Denver and died there on April 12, 1941 in the company of her two sons. She was buried alongside her late husband at Denver's Fairmount Cemetery.
