= Macalister-Stebbins Bond Fraud =

1859 financial scandal in Illinois

The Macalister-Stebbins Bond Fraud was a financial scandal that occurred in the State of Illinois in 1859. While investigating the Canal Scrip Fraud, the State Senate Finance Committee discovered that a special class of bonds the state had issued in 1841 had been improperly redeemed. The bonds were known as the Macalister-Stebbins bonds after the bankers who had sold them on behalf of the state. The bonds had been issued during the state's financial crisis to pay interest that the state owed on other obligations. The bonds carried a face value of $1,000, but at auction had only sold for an average of $286. When the bonds came due in 1849, the state devalued them, agreeing to pay only $286 plus interest.

In early 1859, Illinois Governor William Bissell approved redeeming the remaining outstanding bonds with new bonds at the original $1000 face value plus interest. He had apparently been influenced in part by State Representative Alonzo Mack (R-Kankakee), who acted as an agent in the transaction. When the Finance Committee brought the matter to light, the Democratic press pronounced the redemption illegal and demanded an explanation from the administration. The state auditor, Jesse Dubois, denied any involvement with the bond swap. Governor Bissell eventually rescinded his decision and the new bonds were returned to the state. As a result of the scandal the state treasurer, James Miller, resigned.

In 1862, the president of a New York bank that held some of the outstanding Macalister-Stebbins bonds met with President Abraham Lincoln in Washington, DC. Lincoln wrote to Dubois, who was still Auditor, suggesting the bondholders be given a "full and fair hearing."

In 1865, the Illinois legislature again passed a bill allowing the outstanding bonds to be redeemed at their original purchase price plus interest and the remaining bonds were cashed in.
