= Fanny Ronalds =

American socialite and amateur singer (1839–1916)

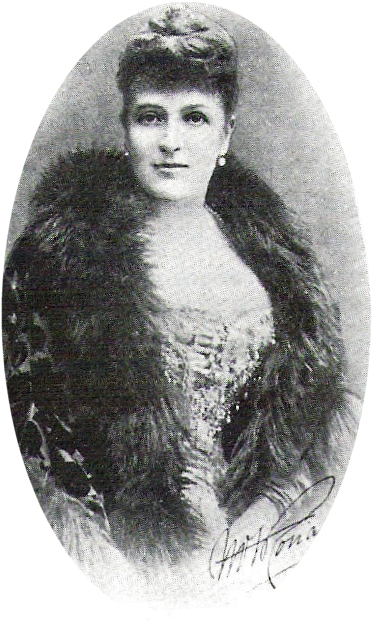
Fanny Ronalds

Mary Frances Ronalds RRC DStJ (née Carter; August 23, 1839 – July 28, 1916) was an American socialite and amateur singer who is best known for her long affair with the composer Arthur Sullivan and for her musical salons.

Ronalds moved with her husband and children from New York to Paris in 1864, but the two separated in 1868. She took her children to Tunis in 1869, and eventually to London in 1875. She was accepted into royal social circles and was a popular hostess. A noted beauty, she became romantically involved with Arthur Sullivan during the 1870s and continued as his companion until his death in 1900. She was much admired as a singer and became associated with one of Sullivan's most popular songs, "The Lost Chord".

== Early life ==
Ronalds, generally called "Fanny", was born in New York City and raised in Boston, Massachusetts, the daughter of Joseph Ballard Carter (1813–1889) and his wife, Mary (née Chamberlain) Carter (died 1898). In the mid-1850s, showing a talent for singing, she travelled to Italy to take singing lessons. In 1859 at age twenty, she married Pierre Lorillard Ronalds (grandson of Pierre Lorillard II), a dozen years her senior, a New Yorker called by The New York Times, "The Father of American Coaching". She quickly became a noted socialite and hostess. At one magnificent ball that she gave in the early 1860s, Ronalds famously appeared dressed "as Music, in a white satin gown embroidered with bars from Verdi's Un ballo in maschera", wearing a harp-shaped, illuminated crown. From 1860 to 1862 the couple lived in Paris, and from 1862 to 1864 in New York. The Ronalds had four children. A contemporary account described Fanny Ronalds as follows: "Her face was perfectly divine in its loveliness, her features small and exquisitely regular. Her hair was a dark shade of brown – châtain foncé [deep chestnut] – and very abundant... a lovely woman, with the most generous smile one could possibly imagine, and the most beautiful teeth."

She developed a relationship with the wealthy Leonard Jerome (Winston Churchill's grandfather), a notorious womanizer, but somehow maintained a friendship with his wife and daughters, including Jennie Jerome, who remembered Ronalds singing them to sleep. She often visited their home in Newport, Rhode Island, and after Mrs. Jerome moved to Paris with her daughters, the Ronalds followed in 1864, taking their own children. In Paris, noted for her beauty and social talents, she joined the court circles of the pleasure-loving Empress Eugénie and Napoleon III. During a party, Napoleon rescued her after she fell into one of his ponds. She had met Arthur Sullivan in the early 1860s. According to The New York Times, she became the leader of the American community in Paris. Her husband was abusive, and in 1868, in the French courts, Ronalds obtained a legal separation from him, giving her control over their children.

Introduced by Napoleon and Eugénie to British society, she quickly became one of the many "friends" of the Prince of Wales (later King Edward VII) and was soon known for hosting fashionable musical entertainments and elegant soirées for artists, musicians and high society. With the faltering of the Second Empire as unrest grew in France, her opportunities there collapsed, and Ronalds moved with her children to Tunis in 1869. There she became a partner in a farm near Sidi Thabet with Ferdinand Veillet-Devaux, the Count de Sancy; after some legal troubles, the venture ended in 1874.

== Years as Sullivan's mistress ==
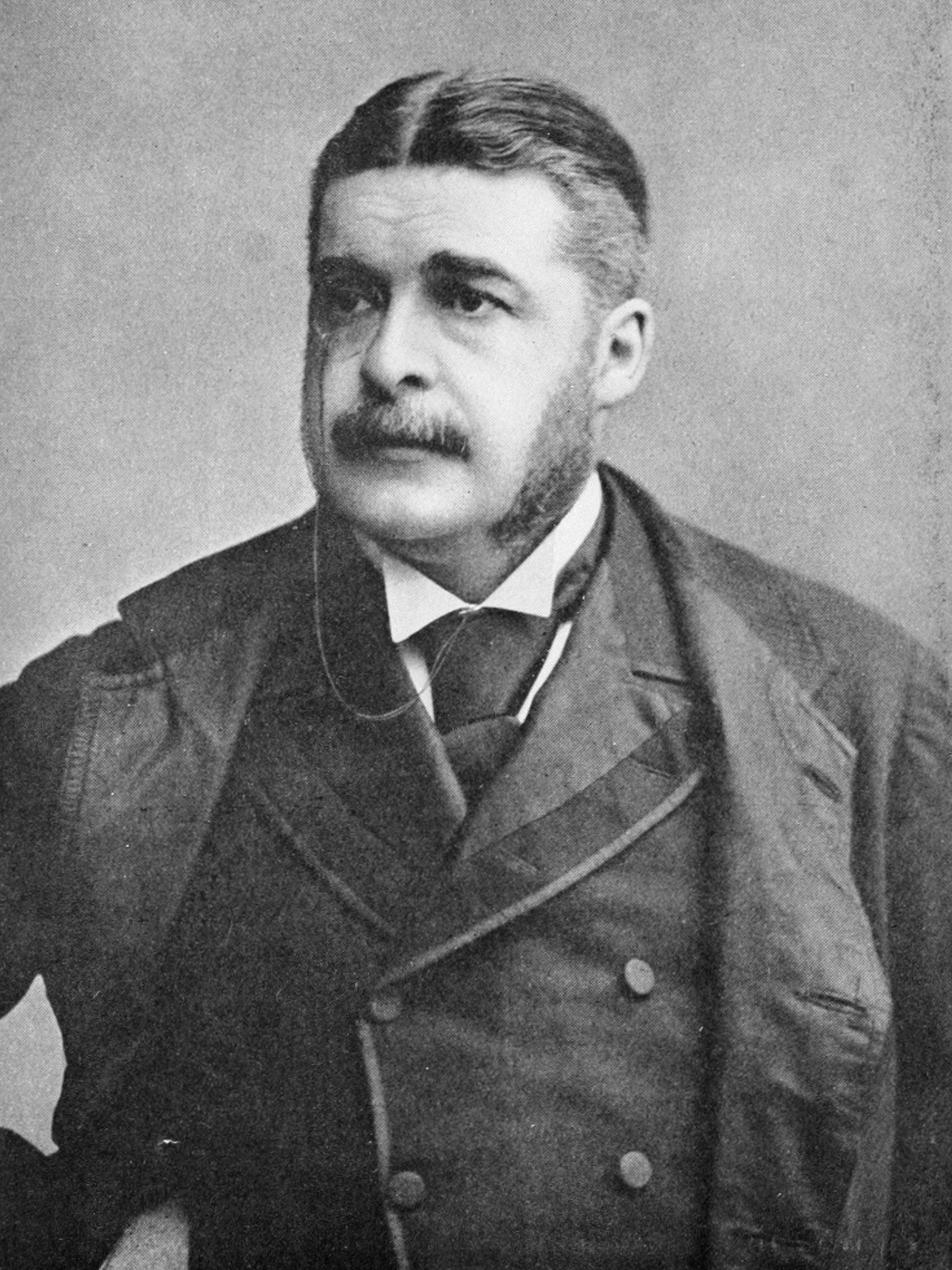
Arthur Sullivan

In early 1875, Ronalds left Tunis and moved to London. She had continued to maintain her friendship with Jennie Jerome, who became Lady Randolph Churchill in 1874, with the Prince of Wales and his brother, the Duke of Edinburgh, and with various Americans and French living in London. She later became friendly with Queen Victoria and Queen Alexandra.

Ronalds' affair with Sullivan began not long after she moved to London. Three years his senior, she was still in her thirties and beautiful, with a strong personality. Social conventions of the time compelled them to keep their relationship discreet. She was still married (she filed a petition for divorce in 1875 but quietly dropped it in 1878); but even had she been divorced, Sullivan would not have been willing to face the social stigma of marrying a divorcee and other members of British society would not have associated with a divorcee. Her relationship with Sullivan deepened after the deaths of his brother Fred (1877) and his mother (1882). Sullivan became close with Ronalds' children and parents, especially after his brother Fred's family moved to America in 1883. In his diaries, Sullivan referred to her as "Mrs. Ronalds" when he saw her in a public setting, but "L. W." (for "Little Woman") when they were alone together, often with a number in parentheses indicating the number of sexual acts completed. It is thought that Ronalds was pregnant on at least two occasions, and she apparently procured an abortion in 1882 and again in 1884. The 1999 biographical film Topsy-Turvy depicts Sullivan and Ronalds discussing an abortion at around the time of the production of The Mikado. Eleanor David portrays Ronalds in the film.

Sullivan had a roving eye, and his diary records the occasional quarrel when one of his many other liaisons was discovered, but he always returned to Ronalds. She was his constant companion until his death in 1900, but by about 1889 or 1890, the sexual relationship seems to have ended. He started to refer to her in the diary as "Auntie" (she also was called "auntie" by his nephew, Herbert Sullivan), and the tick marks indicating sexual activity were no longer there, although similar notation continued to be used for his relationships with other women who have not been identified and who were always referred to by their initials.

Ronalds was an excellent and much admired singer, using her voice for good causes since her days in New York, when she gave concerts in aid of Civil War troops; later "in Paris she was known as the "Patti des Salons". Sullivan described her as "the best amateur singer in London", and both British and American papers continued to note her charitable and musical endeavors. Ronalds was performing Sullivan's songs by 1877. She often performed Sullivan's songs at her famous Sunday soirees. She became particularly associated with one of his most popular songs, "The Lost Chord", which he composed in 1877 as he watched over his dying brother. Ronalds became its most famous interpreter, singing it both in private and in public, often with Sullivan himself accompanying her. When Sullivan died, he left her the autograph manuscript of that song, along with other bequests. For Ronalds, Sullivan composed the song "St. Agnes' Eve". Ronalds also wrote songs, including "In Shadow" (1881).

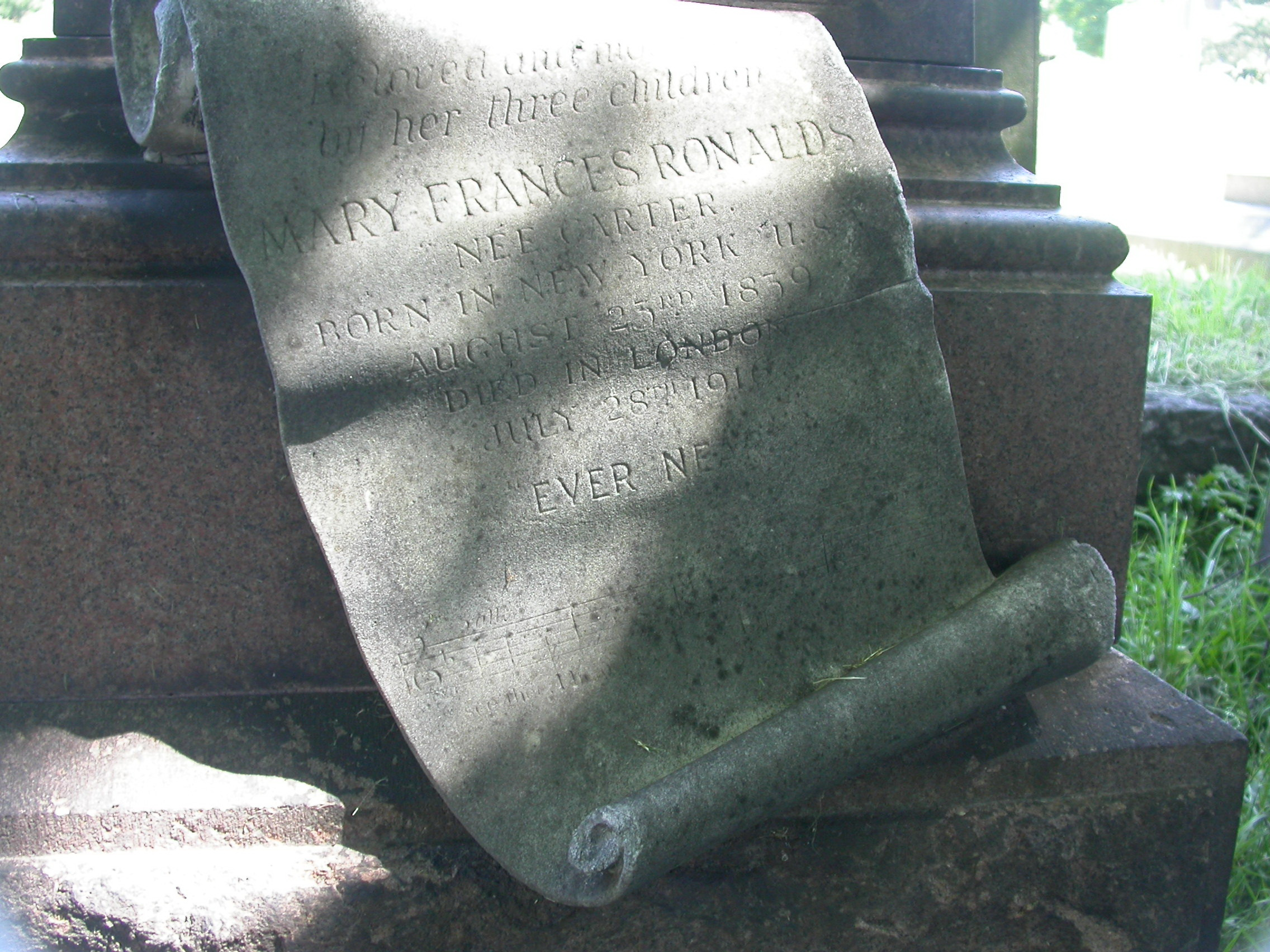
Ronalds's gravesite

In 1899 when the Boer War broke out, Ronalds was elected treasurer of an American ladies' effort to finance a hospital ship, the RFA Maine, to be sent to South Africa. She was also active in charitable work for the Red Cross and received the Royal Red Cross among other honours. In July 1901 she was appointed an Honorary Lady of Grace of the Order of St. John.

== Death and legacy ==
When Ronalds died in 1916, at the age of 76, a copy of the manuscript of "The Lost Chord" was buried with her, at her request. Ronalds is buried in the Brompton Cemetery in London. In an inscription to a wreath that she sent to the funeral, Princess Louise described Ronalds as "one of the kindest and most unselfish of women". She was survived by three of her children, Fannette ("Fannie") Florence Ritchie (1860–1940), Pierre Lorillard Ronalds, Jr. (1862–1928) and Reginald Ronalds (1863–1924, who became a Rough Rider)
