= Fred Sullivan =

English actor and singer

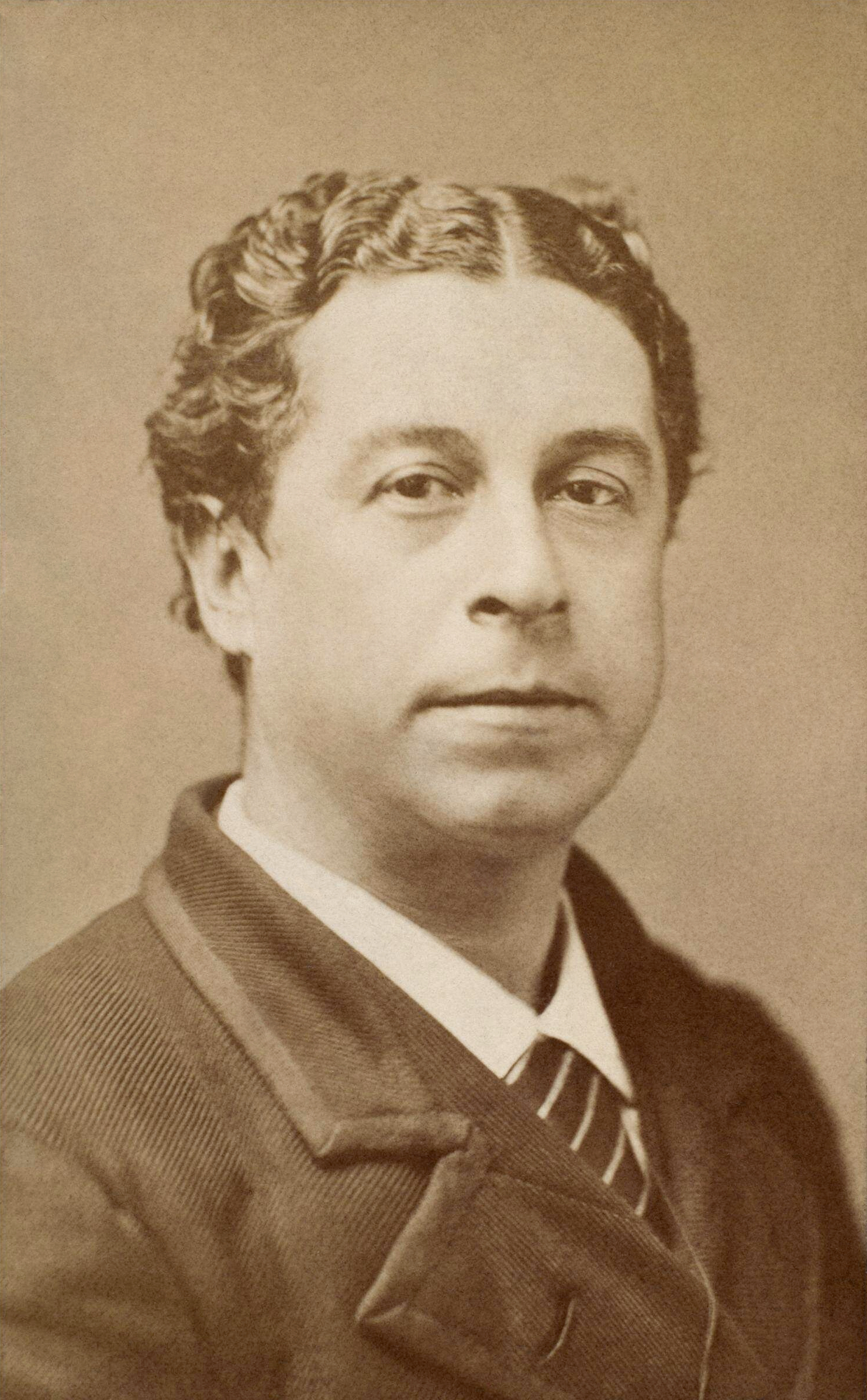
Portrait of Fred Sullivan

Frederic Sullivan (25 December 1837 – 18 January 1877) was an English actor and singer. He originated the role of the Learned Judge in Gilbert and Sullivan's 1875 comic opera Trial by Jury, providing the model for the comic roles in the later Savoy operas.

Born into a musical family, he initially trained as an architectural draftsman but, in 1869, abandoned the profession for a career on stage. In 1871, he first performed the role of Mr. Cox in a revival of his brother Arthur's first comic opera, Cox and Box, and later that year created the role of Apollo in the first Gilbert and Sullivan opera, Thespis. He then remained with the Gaiety Theatre company, playing in Jacques Offenbach pieces, among others. In 1874 he played in comic operas on tour and in other London theatres.

In 1875, he created the role of the Learned Judge in Trial by Jury, also playing in the accompanying Offenbach piece, La Périchole, and earning enthusiastic reviews. He then toured in Trial, and French operettas, returning to London for the revival of Trial. By early 1876, Sullivan's health was deteriorating, and he was forced to stop performing in October 1876. He died in January 1877, leaving a pregnant widow and seven young children. His brother Arthur's enduring song, "The Lost Chord", was composed at Fred's bedside. After Fred's death, Arthur became guardian to the children and helped support Fred's family for the rest of his life, even after they moved to California.

== Early life and career ==
Born in Lambeth, England, Sullivan was the elder brother of composer Arthur Sullivan. His father, Thomas Sullivan (1805–1866), was a military bandmaster and music teacher born in Ireland, who was educated in Chelsea, London, and was based for some years at the Royal Military College, Sandhurst. His mother Mary Clementina (née Coghlan, 1811–1882) was English, of Irish and Italian descent. He trained as an architectural draftsman, and worked as an architect and surveyor, but turned to a career as a performer. Later, he quipped, "I still draw large houses." According to Leslie Ayre, Fred sometimes accompanied Arthur to the Chapel Royal and "amuse[d] the boys with comic songs".

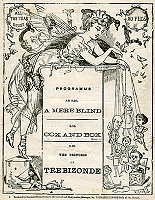
Sullivan played Mr. Cox in this 1874 production

Sullivan first appeared in several amateur productions, but in 1869 he made his professional debut as Bouncer in his brother Arthur's first comic opera, Cox and Box, with a libretto by F. C. Burnand. In 1870 he played Ali Brown Windsor in a burlesque by Robert Reece, Whittington Junior, and his Sensation Cat, at the New Royalty Theatre, and as Smart in the accompanying farce Rendezvous. The next year, he played Punch in Punchinello by W. C. Levey. In August and September 1871, he ran a provincial touring company, taking the role of Mr. Cox in Cox and Box, with Richard Temple as Bouncer and Richard D'Oyly Carte conducting. The other works played by "Mr. Sullivan's Operetta Company" that summer were two Offenbach adaptations, Rose of Auvergne (with Sullivan as Pierre) and Breaking the Spell, in which Selina Dolaro starred. In October, at the Alhambra Theatre, he again played Mr. Cox in a revival of Cox and Box.

Sullivan created the role of Apollo in his brother's first operatic collaboration with W. S. Gilbert, Thespis, at the Gaiety Theatre, which ran from December 1871 until March 1872. During this run, he also starred in the companion pieces Dearer than Life by H. J. Byron and Franz von Suppé's Ganymede and Galatea. He continued to appear at the Gaiety in 1872 and 1873 in Cox and Box and playing Patachon in Offenbach's A Mere Blind (1872), Marquis Beaurivage Fleurette (1873). He moved to the Holborn Empire Theatre by early 1874.

After performances in the spring at Crystal Palace with his own operetta company, Sullivan took his own company on tour, in the summer of 1874, appearing in his brother's two collaborations with Burnand, Cox and Box, as Cox, and The Contrabandista, as Grigg, together with a version of Die schöne Galathee adapted as a burlesque of Gilbert's play, Pygmalion and Galatea, in which Sullivan played Midas "the pseudo art patron". The tour also played a comic ballet, Fra Diavolo, and Offenbach's Lischen et Fritzchen. He again played Cox in Cox and Box at the Gaiety Theatre beginning in September 1874. At this time, he met and became firm friends with George Grossmith, before Grossmith had met Sullivan's brother. Later in 1874, he appeared at the Opera Comique as Mercury in Ixion Rewheel'd, an opéra bouffe extravaganza by F. C. Burnand, with music selected by W. C. Levey, and at the Holborn Amphitheatre as the impoverished and henpecked Duke of Rodomont, in Melusine the Enchantress by G. M. Layton and Hervé. In the autumn of that year, he and Carte were both concerned in presenting a touring production of Lecocq's La fille de Madame Angot, for which Sullivan was credited as "secretary", but in which he did not perform.

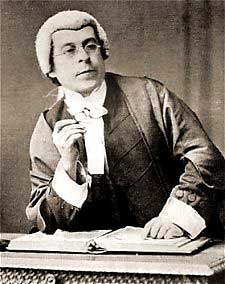
Fred Sullivan as The Learned Judge in Trial by Jury

== Trial by Jury and death ==
Sullivan next joined the company of Selina Dolaro at the Royalty Theatre, opening on 30 January 1875 in the role of Don Andres, the British Viceroy, in Offenbach's La Périchole. Richard D'Oyly Carte was manager of the theatre for Dolaro, and when one of La Périchole's companion pieces proved weak, Carte asked Gilbert to collaborate with Arthur Sullivan to write a one-act piece for the theatre. Gilbert and Sullivan wrote the role of the Learned Judge in the opera Trial by Jury for Fred Sullivan, and it opened at the Royalty on 25 March 1875. Fred also continued to play Don Andres. The role of Judge became the one for which Fred Sullivan was most famous.

Sullivan was made up for the role of the Learned Judge to look like the Lord Chief Justice, Sir Alexander Cockburn. The first-night critics reserved especial praise for his performance: "The greatest 'hit' was made by Mr. F. Sullivan, whose blending of official dignity, condescension, and, at the right moment, extravagant humour, made the character of the Judge stand out with all requisite prominence, and added much to the interest of the piece." The Times concurred: "Mr. F. Sullivan's impersonation of the learned and impressionable Judge deserves a special word of praise for its quiet and natural humour." The Yorkshire Herald thought that the authors "owed much of the success" of Trial to Sullivan's "clever", "refined" and tasteful portrayal of the character. Sullivan's performance was the hit of the show, and his role established the pattern for the later comic "patter" roles" that became famous in the Savoy operas. The Gilbert and Sullivan scholar Reginald Allen wrote that the role "was a triumph" for Sullivan, who had not previously "shown his true potential as a comedian." F. C. Burnand wrote of him: "Fred Sullivan, Arthur's brother, was one of the most naturally comic little men I ever came across. He, too, was a first-rate practical musician. ... As he was the most absurd person, so was he the very kindliest. The brothers were devoted to each other".

The Lost Chord
A 1913 recording of "The Lost Chord" sung by Reed Miller.

After the Royalty closed for the summer in June 1875, Sullivan toured with Dolaro's company, performing in operettas, playing the Viceroy in La Périchole and Pomponnet in Lecocq's La fille de Madame Angot, as well as the Judge in Trial. He was back at the Royalty Theatre when it reopened for the autumn season, again playing the Judge, and continued in the role when the show opened at the Opera Comique beginning in January 1876, except when he played the role in a few matinee performances at the Gaiety Theatre. In March 1876, W. S. Penley replaced Sullivan as the Judge for several performances when Sullivan was too ill to play the role because of his worsening tuberculosis. Sullivan was, however, able to resume the role until the production closed in May. From May to October, Emily Soldene's company played Trial on tour with Sullivan as the Judge, and also as Pomponnet in La Fille de Madame Angot and Cocorico in Geneviève de Brabant. It was announced that he would be involved with the next Gilbert and Sullivan opera the following season, but he became ill.

Sullivan died of liver disease and tuberculosis in Fulham, in 1877, at the age of 39. Arthur Sullivan's enduring song, "The Lost Chord", was composed at Fred's bedside just five days before Fred died, and it is dedicated to his memory.

== Family and legacy ==
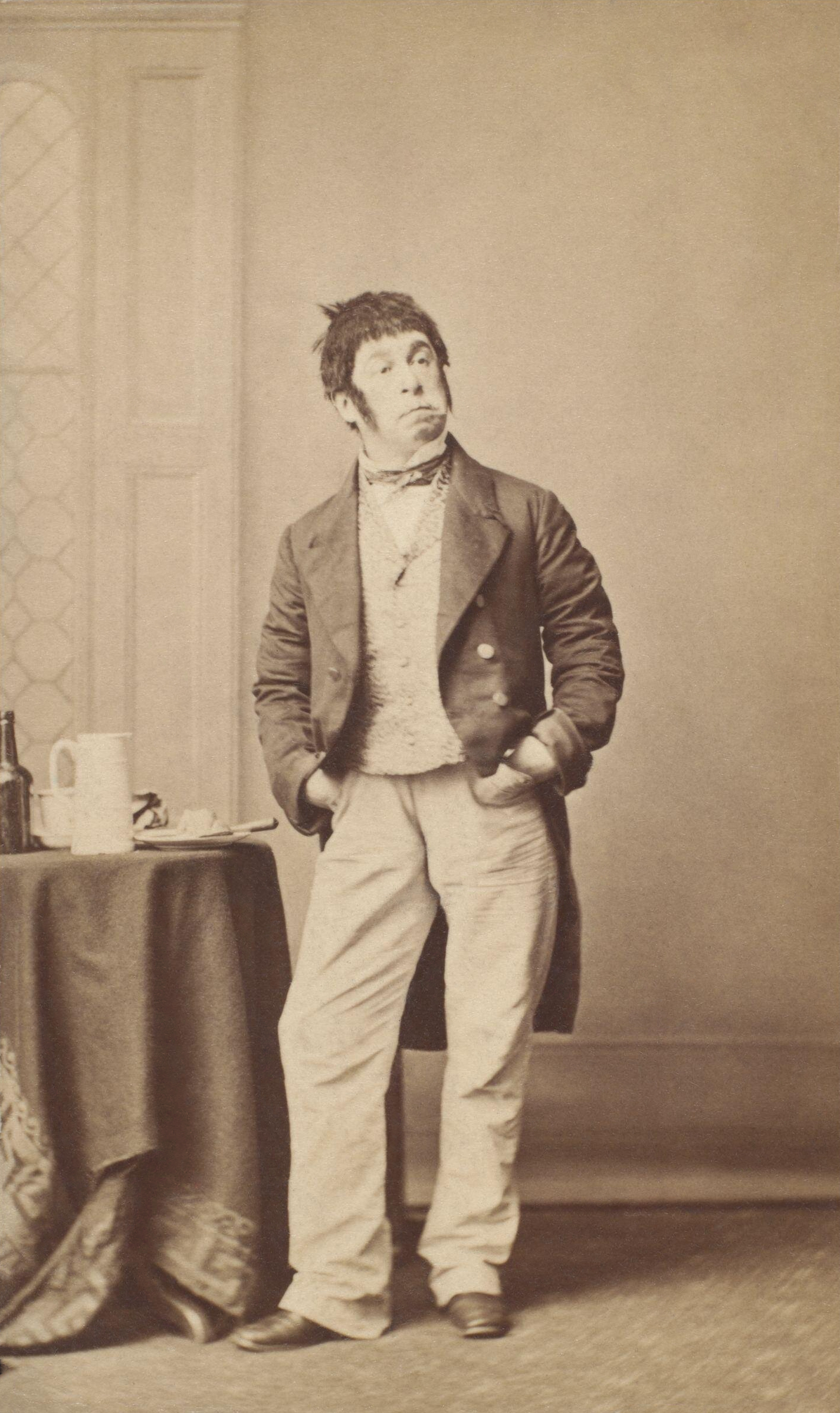
Sullivan in an early role

Sullivan married Charlotte Louisa Lacy (1841–1885) in 1862, and they had eight children: Amy Sophie (1863–1947), Florence Louise (1865–1891), Edith Mary (1866–1877), Herbert Thomas "Bertie" (1868–1928), Maud Helen "Cissie" (1870–1940), Frederic Richard ("Dickie") (1872–1937), George Arthur (1874–1919), and William Lacy (1877–1902). At Sullivan's death, Charlotte was pregnant and had seven children under the age of 14. Edith, however, died shortly after her father. After Fred Sullivan's death, Arthur visited the family often and became guardian to all of the children. He was closely involved in their lives, hosting them on European summer holidays. Even before Fred's death, Amy lived with Arthur and her grandmother in London for a year after an 1875 illness. In 1881, Charlotte married Captain Benjamin Hutchinson, a man 13 years her junior.

In December 1883, at the urging of Charlotte's brother, William Lacy, Charlotte, her new husband, and six of her seven surviving children emigrated to Los Angeles, California, leaving the oldest son, Bertie, in Arthur Sullivan's sole care. Despite Arthur's reservations about the move to Los Angeles, he paid for the trip and continued to give very substantial financial support to the family.

Charlotte died in January 1885, barely a year after the move to California. From June to August 1885, after completing his work on The Mikado, Arthur Sullivan travelled to America to visit the family in Los Angeles and to take them on a sightseeing trip of the American West, including Yosemite Valley. Hutchinson, unable to cope with the loss of his wife and overwhelmed by his responsibilities, returned to England later that year, leaving the six children to be raised mostly by Charlotte's brother and the older girls, with the financial support of their uncle Arthur. Baby Harold, Hutchinson's only child with Charlotte, died shortly before his return. Arthur Sullivan continued, throughout the rest of his life and in his will, to take good care of Fred's children, continuing to correspond with them, sending money, and concerning himself with their education, marriages and financial affairs. Bertie lived with his uncle in London for the rest of Arthur's life.

Fred Sullivan is buried at Brompton Cemetery, London, together with his parents, Thomas Sullivan and Mary Clementina Sullivan. It was originally planned that Arthur would also be buried there until Queen Victoria insisted on his interment in St Paul's Cathedral. A biography of Sullivan, by Elaine Richardson, was published in 2025.
