= Thomas Hayes Campbell =

American politician

Thomas Hayes Campbell (May 15, 1815 – November 22, 1862) was an American politician.

Born in Hartstown, Pennsylvania, Campbell moved with his family to Illinois and eventually settled in Springfield, Illinois. From 1842 to 1857, Campbell served as the Auditor of Public Accounts, State of Illinois. During the American Civil War, Campbell helped with the auditing of accounts of the Illinois state government. Campbell died in Springfield, Illinois, from asthma.
