= 1882 Colorado gubernatorial election =

- November 7, 1882
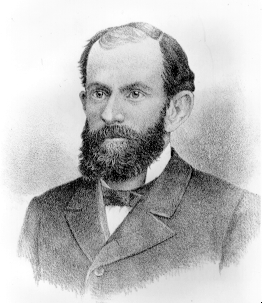

Nominee	James Benton Grant	E. L. Campbell
Party	Democratic	Republican
Popular vote	31,375	28,820
Percentage	51.07%	46.91%
- County results Grant: 50–60% 60–70% Campbell: 40–50% 50–60% 60–70%
Governor before election
Frederick Walker Pitkin
Republican
Elected Governor
James Benton Grant
Democratic

The 1882 Colorado gubernatorial election was held on November 7, 1882. Democratic nominee James Benton Grant defeated Republican nominee E. L. Campbell with 51.07% of the vote. This election marks the first time that Colorado ever supported a Democratic Party candidate for governor. Grant flipped 11 counties previously won by Pitkin, most notably Arapahoe County, home at the time to the state capital of Denver. Conversely, Campbell only managed to flip two counties, namely the sparsely populated counties of Costilla and Huerfano in southern Colorado.

== General election ==
=== Candidates ===
Major party candidates

- James Benton Grant, Democratic
- E. L. Campbell, Republican

Other candidates

- George Woy, Greenback

=== Results ===
1882 Colorado gubernatorial election
Party	Candidate	Votes	%	±%
Democratic	James Benton Grant	31,375	51.07%	+6.99%
Republican	E. L. Campbell	28,820	46.91%	−6.37%
Greenback	George Woy	1,220	1.99%	−0.65%
Majority		2,555	4.16%	
Turnout		61,415		
Democratic gain from Republican		Swing		

==== By county ====
County	Grant %	Grant #	Campbell %	Campbell #	Woy %	Woy #	Total
Arapahoe	58.81%	6,569	40.39%	4,512	0.78%	88	11,169
Bent	62.98%	371	37.01%	218	0.00%	0	589
Boulder	40.94%	975	42.83%	1,020	16.21%	386	2,381
Chaffee	51.50%	1,166	48.40%	1,096	0.08%	2	2,264
Clear Creek	50.33%	1,122	48.00%	1,070	1.65%	37	2,229
Conejos	43.71%	438	56.28%	564	0.00%	0	1,002
Costilla	42.05%	262	57.62%	359	0.00%	0	623
Custer	40.81%	651	59.12%	943	0.06%	1	1,595
Dolores	52.73%	241	44.42%	203	2.84%	13	457
Douglas	52.08%	237	47.01%	218	0.00%	0	455
El Paso	42.99%	825	56.12%	1,077	0.88%	17	1,919
Elbert	60.50%	216	39.49%	141	0.00%	0	357
Fremont	40.16%	586	54.35%	793	5.48%	80	1,459
Gilpin	46.85%	843	51.86%	933	1.27%	23	1,799
Grand	40.88%	157	58.85%	226	0.26%	1	384
Gunnison	55.31%	2,226	44.40%	1,787	0.27%	11	4,024
Hinsdale	52.25%	336	47.58%	306	0.15%	1	643
Huerfano	48.67%	531	50.22%	548	1.09%	12	1,091
Jefferson	51.68%	829	45.07%	723	3.24%	52	1,604
La Plata	55.03%	699	43.54%	553	1.41%	18	1,270
Lake	50.75%	3,508	49.24%	3,403	0.00%	0	6,911
Larimer	33.17%	542	58.01%	948	8.81%	144	1,634
Las Animas	68.37%	1,589	31.06%	722	0.55%	13	2,324
Ouray	54.88%	506	44.57%	411	0.54%	5	922
Park	51.61%	687	47.03%	626	1.35%	18	1,331
Pitkin	49.37%	238	50.62%	244	0.00%	0	482
Pueblo	53.23%	1,689	45.82%	1,454	0.94%	30	3,173
Rio Grande	39.61%	351	60.38%	535	0.00%	0	886
Routt	34.54%	38	65.45%	72	0.00%	0	110
Saguache	48.69%	618	50.35%	639	0.94%	12	1,269
San Juan	50.86%	471	47.19%	437	1.94%	18	926
Summit	52.86%	1,253	46.79%	1,109	0.33%	8	2,370
Weld	39.01%	611	46.61%	730	14.36%	225	1,566

Counties that flipped from Republican to Democratic

- Arapahoe
- Chaffee
- Clear Creek
- Douglas
- Gunnison
- Jefferson
- Ouray
- Park
- Pueblo
- San Juan
- Summit

Counties that flipped from Democratic to Republican

- Costilla
- Huerfano
