= RFA Maine (1887) =

Hospital ship of the Royal Fleet Auxiliary

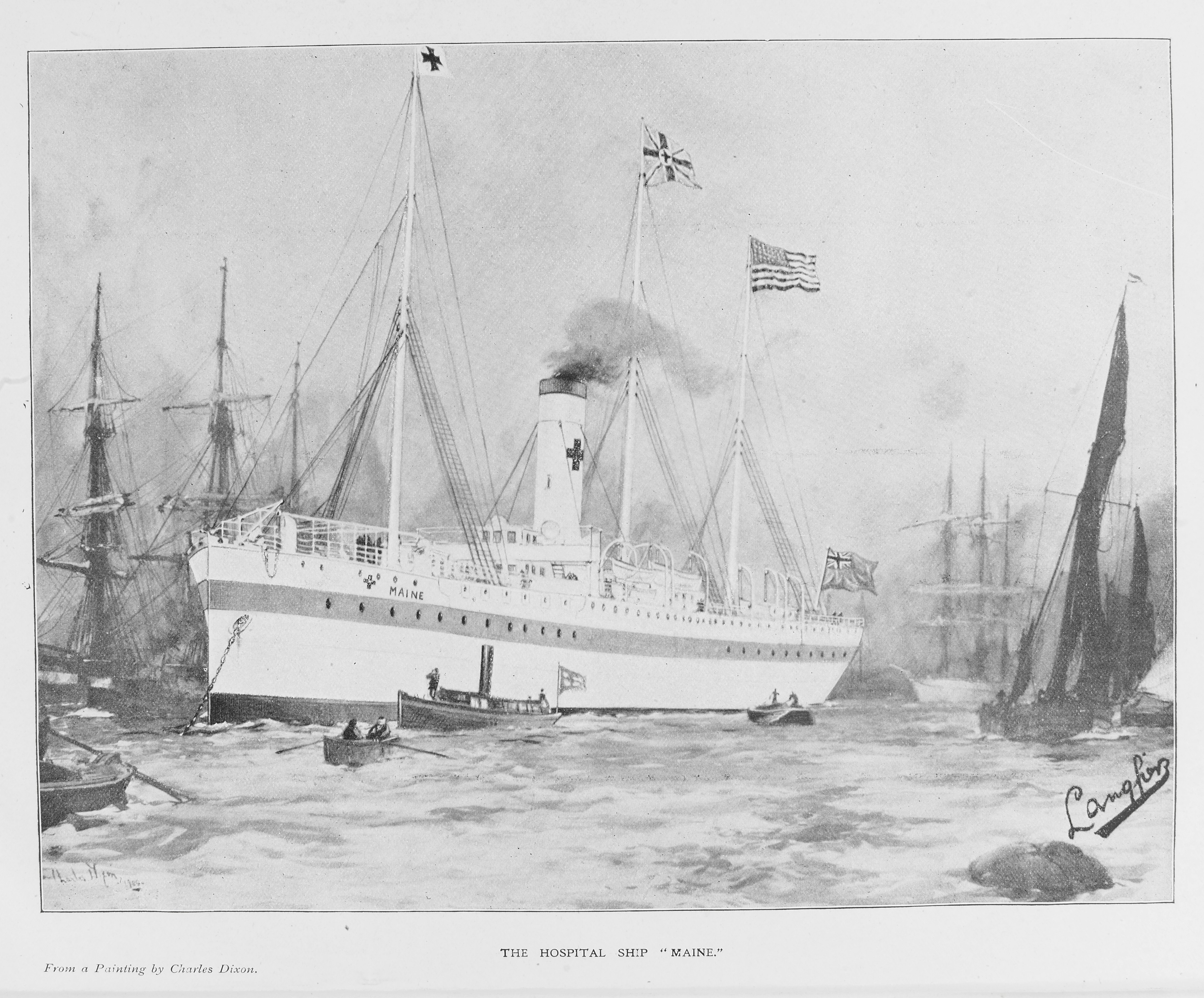
- Maine

History

United Kingdom
- Name: RFA Maine
- Builder: William Gray & Company, Hartlepool
- Launched: 8 June 1887
- Acquired: October 1899
- Commissioned: 29 June 1901
- Fate: Wrecked, 17 June 1914

General characteristics
- Type: Hospital ship
- Tonnage: 2,809 GRT
- Length: 315 ft 2 in (96.06 m)
- Propulsion: Triple expansion engine, single screw

RFA Maine was a hospital ship of the British Royal Fleet Auxiliary, which served during the Second Boer War, up until the eve of World War I.

The first ship to bear the name was the former cattle/passenger ship Swansea, built by William Gray & Company of Hartlepool, and launched on 8 June 1887. Owned and operated by Bernard N. Baker's Atlantic Transport Line, Swansea was renamed Maine in 1888.

== Conversion to hospital ship ==
In October 1899 the Boer War broke out in South Africa and Baker immediately offered the British Admiralty the use of a vessel as a hospital ship. Funding for the conversion was raised by the "American Ladies Hospital Ship Society" based in London and headed by Jennie Churchill, Fanny Ronalds, and Jennie Goodell Blow, the later of whom had come up with the idea. All were American-born socialites, and the effort raised money from Americans. While crewed by a British crew once handed over to the American government, the ship was staffed with American medical workers. The Maine sailed for South Africa on 23 December 1899, with Jennie Churchill aboard, and arrived at Durban on 23 January 1900. One of the earliest beneficiaries was Jennie's younger son Jack, wounded during the Relief of Ladysmith. After only four months, she returned to UK and then went to China for the Boxer Rebellion. The following year she was again back in the UK, and in March 1901 she served in the Mediterranean as hospital ship to the Mediterranean Squadron.

== In RFA service ==
At the end of war the ship was donated to the British Government and entered Navy service on 29 June 1901, and became a Royal Fleet Auxiliary ship in 1905 on the formation of the service. In June 1911 she took part in the Coronation Fleet Review for King George V at Torbay. She was lost on 17 June 1914 when she ran aground in fog on the Isle of Mull, Scotland and was wrecked. On 6 July 1914 the wreck was sold for scrap.
