= Joel Aldrich Matteson =

Governor of Illinois from 1853 to 1857

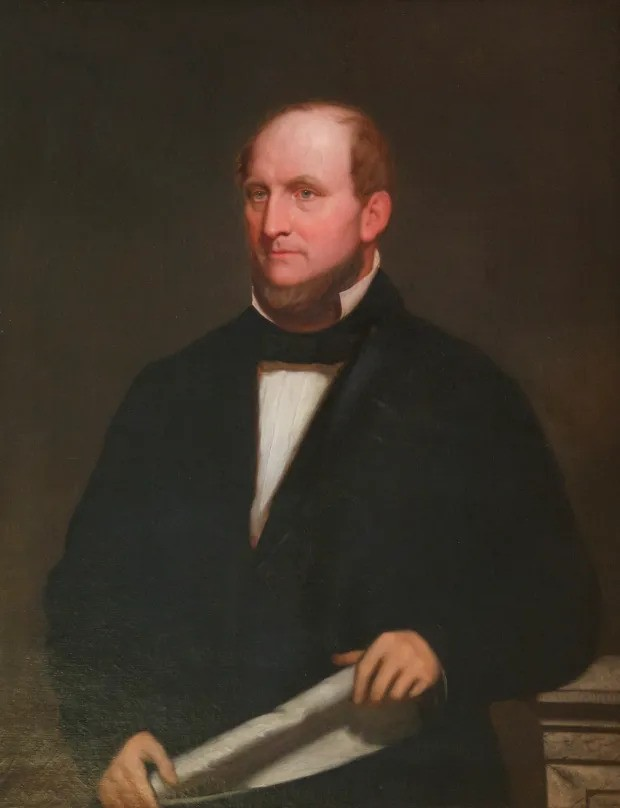
- Matteson's Portrait in the Illinois State Capitol's Hall of Governors

10th Governor of Illinois
- In office January 10, 1853 – January 12, 1857
- Lieutenant: Gustav Koerner
- Preceded by: Augustus C. French
- Succeeded by: William Henry Bissell

Personal details
- Born: August 8, 1808 Watertown, New York, US
- Died: January 31, 1873 (aged 64) Chicago, Illinois, US
- Party: Democratic
- Spouse: Mary Fish
- Relatives: Roswell Eaton Goodell (son-in-law); Jennie Goodell Blow (granddaughter); Mary Goodell Grant (granddaughter)
- Profession: Politician

Joel Aldrich Matteson (Note: /ˈmætɪsən/) (August 8, 1808 – January 31, 1873) was the tenth governor of Illinois, serving from 1853 to 1857. He was the last Democratic governor of the state until John Peter Altgeld took office in 1893.

== Career ==
In 1855, he became the first governor to reside in the Illinois Executive Mansion. In January 1855, during the joint legislative session of the Illinois House and Senate convened to choose a US senator, he became a surprise candidate. On the 9th ballot, he received 47 votes, 3 short of the 50 needed to win. Abraham Lincoln, who was also a contestant, then asked his supporters to vote for Lyman Trumbull, who won on the 10th ballot.

After his term as governor ended he was for many years the president of the Chicago and Alton Railroad.

== Later life ==
The last years of his life were marred by charges of corruption in the Canal Scrip Fraud case. The village of Matteson, Illinois is named in his honor. Matteson was buried in Joliet, Illinois.

== Notes ==
Party political offices
Preceded by Augustus C. French	Democratic nominee for Governor of Illinois; 1852	Succeeded by William Alexander Richardson
Political offices
Preceded by Augustus C. French	Governor of Illinois; 1853–1857	Succeeded by William Henry Bissell
