= Canal Scrip Fraud =

The Canal Scrip Fraud was a financial scandal that involved illegal redemption of canal scrip that had been issued by the state of Illinois to pay for construction of the Illinois–Michigan Canal.

Canal scrip were IOUs the state had begun issuing in 1839 when it ran out of money during a fiscal crisis. In February of 1859, the state auditor, Jesse K. Dubois, reported to the legislature that bundles of canal scrip had been illegally redeemed in 1857 by the immediate past governor, Joel A. Matteson. A senate investigation found that scrip previously redeemed and cancelled had been transferred to then Governor Matteson from the canal office in Lockport. Matteson subsequently redeemed this scrip a second time. Matteson submitted a letter to the investigating committee stating he had unwittingly purchased it from anonymous sellers and offered to reimburse the state for its losses. The Democratically controlled legislature passed a resolution accepting Matteson's offer and the investigation ended.

Not satisfied with the legislature's action, the Republican state officeholders referred the case to the Sangamon County grand jury for review. After taking testimony in April of 1859, the grand jury voted to indict Matteson. The vote was reconsidered however, and several jurors changed their minds. On a subsequent vote, Matteson was acquitted.
