= 1848–49 United States Senate elections =

- Various dates
- Class 3

19 of the 60 seats in the United States Senate (with special elections) 31 seats needed for a majority
	Majority party	Minority party
Party	Democratic	Whig
Last election	35 seats	19 seats
Seats before	38	21
Seats won	9	9
Seats after	33	25
Seat change	▼5	▲4
Seats up	14	5
	Third party	Fourth party
Party	Independent Democratic	Free Soil
Last election	1 seat
Seats before	0	New party
Seats won	0	1
Seats after	1	1
Seat change	Steady	▲1
Seats up	0
- Results: Democratic gain Democratic hold Whig gain Whig hold Free Soil gain
Majority party before election
Democratic
Elected Majority party
Democratic

The 1848–49 United States Senate elections were held on various dates in various states. As these U.S. Senate elections were prior to the ratification of the Seventeenth Amendment in 1913, senators were chosen by state legislatures. Senators were elected over a wide range of time throughout 1848 and 1849, and a seat may have been filled months late or remained vacant due to legislative deadlock. In these elections, terms were up for the senators in Class 3.

The Democratic Party lost seats but maintained control of the Senate.

== Results ==
Senate party division, 31st Congress (1849–1851)

- Majority party: Democratic (33–36)
- Minority party: Whig Party (25–24)
- Other parties: Free Soil (2)
- Total seats: 60–62

== Change in Senate composition ==
=== Before the elections ===
D_{1}	D_{2}	D_{3}	D_{4}	D_{5}	D_{6}	D_{7}	D_{8}	D_{9}	D_{10}
D_{20}	D_{19}	D_{18}	D_{17}	D_{16}	D_{15}	D_{14}	D_{13}	D_{12}	D_{11}
D_{21}	D_{22}	D_{23}	D_{24}	D_{25} Ran	D_{26} Ran	D_{27} Ran	D_{28} Ran	D_{29} Ran	D_{30} Ran
Majority →									D_{31} Ran
W_{21} Unknown	ID_{1}	D_{38} Retired	D_{37} Retired	D_{36} Retired	D_{35} Retired	D_{34} Unknown	D_{33} Ran	D_{32} Ran	D_{31} Ran
W_{20} Ran	W_{19} Ran	W_{18} Ran	W_{17} Ran	W_{16}	W_{15}	W_{14}	W_{13}	W_{12}	W_{11}
W_{1}	W_{2}	W_{3}	W_{4}	W_{5}	W_{6}	W_{7}	W_{8}	W_{9}	W_{10}

=== As a result of the elections ===
D_{1}	D_{2}	D_{3}	D_{4}	D_{5}	D_{6}	D_{7}	D_{8}	D_{9}	D_{10}
D_{20}	D_{19}	D_{18}	D_{17}	D_{16}	D_{15}	D_{14}	D_{13}	D_{12}	D_{11}
D_{21}	D_{22}	D_{23}	D_{24}	D_{25} Re-elected	D_{26} Re-elected	D_{27} Re-elected	D_{28} Re-elected	D_{29} Re-elected	D_{30} Hold
Majority →									D_{31} Hold
W_{21} Gain	W_{22} Gain	W_{23} Gain	W_{24} Gain	W_{25} Gain	ID_{1}	FS_{1} Gain	D_{33} Gain	D_{32} Hold	D_{31} Hold
W_{20} Hold	W_{19} Re-elected	W_{18} Re-elected	W_{17} Re-elected	W_{16}	W_{15}	W_{14}	W_{13}	W_{12}	W_{11}
W_{1}	W_{2}	W_{3}	W_{4}	W_{5}	W_{6}	W_{7}	W_{8}	W_{9}	W_{10}

Note: "Re-elected" includes incumbent appointee elected to the next term.

=== Beginning of the next Congress ===
D_{1}	D_{2}	D_{3}	D_{4}	D_{5}	D_{6}	D_{7}	D_{8}	D_{9}	D_{10}
D_{20}	D_{19}	D_{18}	D_{17}	D_{16}	D_{15}	D_{14}	D_{13}	D_{12}	D_{11}
D_{21}	D_{22}	D_{23}	D_{24}	D_{25}	D_{26}	D_{27}	D_{28}	D_{29}	D_{30}
Majority →									D_{31}
W_{21}	W_{22}	W_{23}	W_{24}	W_{25}	FS_{2}	FS_{1}	D_{33}	D_{32}	D_{31}
W_{20}	W_{19}	W_{18}	W_{17}	W_{16}	W_{15}	W_{14}	W_{13}	W_{12}	W_{11}
W_{1}	W_{2}	W_{3}	W_{4}	W_{5}	W_{6}	W_{7}	W_{8}	W_{9}	W_{10}

Key:

D_{#}	Democratic
ID_{#}	Independent Democratic
FS_{#}	Free Soil
W_{#}	Whig
V_{#}	Vacant

== Race summaries ==
=== Special elections during the 30th Congress ===
In these special elections, the winners were seated during 1848 or in 1849 before March 4; ordered by election date.

State	Incumbent			Results	Candidates
State	Senator	Party	Electoral history	Results	Candidates
Mississippi (Class 1)	Jefferson Davis	Democratic	1847 (appointed)	Interim appointee elected January 11, 1848.	▌ ✓ Jefferson Davis (Democratic); [data missing]
Connecticut (Class 1)	Roger S. Baldwin	Whig	1847 (appointed)	Interim appointee elected in May 1848.	▌ ✓ Roger S. Baldwin (Whig); [data missing]
Maine (Class 1)	Wyman Bradbury Seavey Moor	Democratic	1848 (app.)	Interim appointee retired. New senator elected. Democratic hold.	First ballot (May 26, 1848): ▌ ✓ Hannibal Hamlin Sr. (Democratic) 92 H; 23 S; ▌George Evans Sr. (Whig) 42 H; 4 S; ▌Freeman Harlow Morse (Whig) 1 H; 0 S; ▌Luther Severance Sr. (Whig) 1 H; 0 S; ▌Samuel Fessenden Sr. (Liberty) 1 H; 0 S
Wisconsin (Class 1)	None (new state)			Wisconsin admitted to the Union May 29, 1848. Senator elected June 8, 1848. Democratic gain.	▌ ✓ Isaac P. Walker (Democratic) 77.22%; ▌ ✓ Henry Dodge (Democratic) 75.95%; ▌ Alexander L. Collins (Whig) 22.78%; ▌ Edward V. Whiton (Whig) 21.52%; ▌ John Hubbard Tweedy (Whig) 1.27%; ▌ William S. Hamilton (Whig) 1.27%
Wisconsin (Class 3)	None (new state)			Wisconsin admitted to the Union May 29, 1848. Senator elected June 8, 1848. Democratic gain.	▌ ✓ Isaac P. Walker (Democratic) 77.22%; ▌ ✓ Henry Dodge (Democratic) 75.95%; ▌ Alexander L. Collins (Whig) 22.78%; ▌ Edward V. Whiton (Whig) 21.52%; ▌ John Hubbard Tweedy (Whig) 1.27%; ▌ William S. Hamilton (Whig) 1.27%
Alabama (Class 3)	Arthur P. Bagby	Democratic	1841 (special); 1842	Incumbent resigned June 16, 1848 to become U.S. Minister to Russia. New senator elected July 1, 1848. Democratic hold.	▌ ✓ William R. King (Democratic); [data missing]
Arkansas (Class 2)	William K. Sebastian	Democratic	1848 (appointed)	Interim appointee elected November 17, 1848.	▌ ✓ William K. Sebastian (Democratic); [data missing]
Iowa (Class 2)	None (new state)			Iowa was admitted to the Union December 28, 1846. Legislature had failed to elect due to a three-way split that prevented any candidate from earning the required 30 votes. Senator elected December 7, 1848. Democratic gain.	▌ ✓ George Wallace Jones (Democratic); [data missing]
Iowa (Class 3)	None (new state)			Iowa was admitted to the Union December 28, 1846. Legislature had failed to elect due to a three-way split that prevented any candidate from earning the required 30 votes. Senator elected December 7, 1848. Democratic gain.	▌ ✓ Augustus C. Dodge (Democratic); [data missing]
Kentucky (Class 3)	Thomas Metcalfe	Whig	1848 (appointed)	Interim appointee elected January 3, 1849.	▌ ✓ Thomas Metcalfe (Whig) 88 votes; ▌ Lazarus W. Powell (Democratic) 38 votes
Michigan (Class 1)	Thomas Fitzgerald	Democratic	1848 (appointed)	Interim appointee retired. New senator elected January 20, 1849, but did not take his seat until March 4, 1849. Democratic hold.	▌ ✓ Lewis Cass (Democratic); [data missing]
Delaware (Class 1)	John M. Clayton	Whig	1829; 1835	Incumbent resigned February 23, 1849 to become U.S. Secretary of State. New senator elected February 23, 1849. Whig hold.	▌ ✓ John Wales (Whig); [data missing]

=== Races leading to the 31st Congress ===
In these regular elections, the winners were elected for the term beginning March 4, 1849; ordered by state.

All of the elections involved the Class 3 seats.

State	Incumbent			Results	Candidates
State	Senator	Party	Electoral history	Results	Candidates
Alabama	William R. King	Democratic	1848 (special)	Incumbent re-elected in 1848 or 1849.	▌ ✓ William R. King (Democratic); [data missing]
Arkansas	Solon Borland	Democratic	1848 (appointed)	Incumbent appointee elected to a full term in November 1848.	▌ ✓ Solon Borland (Democratic); ▌Ambrose Sevier (Democratic); [data missing]
Connecticut	John M. Niles	Democratic	1842	Incumbent retired. New senator elected in 1848 or 1849. Whig gain.	▌ ✓ Truman Smith (Whig); [data missing]
Florida	James Westcott	Democratic	1845	Incumbent retired. New senator elected in 1848. Whig gain.	▌ ✓ Jackson Morton (Whig); [data missing]
Georgia	Herschel V. Johnson	Democratic	1848 (appointed)	Incumbent retired. New senator elected in 1847. Whig gain.	▌ ✓ William C. Dawson (Whig); [data missing]
Illinois	Sidney Breese	Democratic	1843	Incumbent lost renomination. New senator elected January 13, 1849. Democratic hold.	▌ ✓ James Shields (Democratic); [data missing]
Indiana	Edward A. Hannegan	Democratic	1842	Incumbent lost renomination. New senator elected in 1848. Democratic hold.	▌ ✓ James Whitcomb (Democratic); [data missing]
Kentucky	Thomas Metcalfe	Whig	1848 (appointed) ? (special)	Incumbent retired or lost re-election. New senator elected February 1, 1849. Whig hold.	▌ ✓ Henry Clay (Whig) 93 votes; ▌Richard Mentor Johnson (Democratic) 45 votes
Louisiana	Henry Johnson	Whig	1844 (special)	Incumbent lost re-election. New senator elected in 1848. Democratic gain.	▌ ✓ Pierre Soulé (Democratic); ▌Henry Johnson (Whig); [data missing]
Maryland	James Pearce	Whig	1843	Incumbent re-elected in 1849.	▌ ✓ James Pearce (Whig); [data missing]
Missouri	David Rice Atchison	Democratic	1843 (appointed); 1843 (special)	Incumbent re-elected in 1849.	▌ ✓ David Rice Atchison (Democratic); [data missing]
New Hampshire	Charles G. Atherton	Democratic	1843 (special)	Incumbent retired or lost re-election. New senator elected in 1848 or 1849. Democratic hold.	▌ ✓ Moses Norris Jr. (Democratic); [data missing]
New York	John Adams Dix	Democratic	1845 (special)	Incumbent lost re-election as a Free Soiler. New senator elected February 6, 1849. Whig gain.	▌ ✓ William H. Seward (Whig); ▌John Adams Dix (Free Soil); ▌Reuben H. Walworth (Democratic); ▌Daniel D. Barnard (Whig)
North Carolina	George Badger	Whig	1846 (special)	Incumbent re-elected in 1849.	▌ ✓ George Badger (Whig); [data missing]
Ohio	William Allen	Democratic	1837; 1842	Incumbent lost re-election. New senator elected in 1849. Free Soil gain.	▌ ✓ Salmon P. Chase (Free Soil); ▌Thomas Ewing (Whig); ▌William Allen (Democratic); ▌Joshua Reed Giddings (Free Soil); ▌Reuben Hitchcock (Unknown); ▌Emery D. Potter (Democratic); ▌David T. Disney (Democratic); ▌John C. Vaughn (Unknown)
Pennsylvania	Simon Cameron	Democratic	1845 (special)	Incumbent retired. New senator elected January 10, 1849. Whig gain.	▌ ✓ James Cooper (Whig) 49.62%; ▌Richard Brodhead (Democratic) 46.62%; ▌Thaddeus Stevens (Free Soil) 2.26%
South Carolina	Andrew Butler	Democratic	1846 (appointed) ? (special)	Incumbent re-elected in 1848.	▌ ✓ Andrew Butler (Democratic); [data missing]
Vermont	William Upham	Whig	1843	Incumbent re-elected October 31, 1848.	▌ ✓ William Upham (Whig); ▌ Levi Baker Vilas (Democratic); ▌ Jacob Collamer (Whig)
Wisconsin	Isaac P. Walker	Democratic	1848	Incumbent re-elected on January 17, 1849.	▌ ✓ Isaac P. Walker (Democratic) 52.94%; ▌ Byron Kilbourn (Free Soil) 21.18%; ▌ Alexander Botkin (Whig) 21.18%; ▌ Morgan Lewis Martin (Democratic) 2.35%; ▌ James Duane Doty (Democratic) 1.18%; ▌ William S. Hamilton (Whig) 1.18%

=== Elections during the 31st Congress ===
In these elections, the winners were elected in 1849 after March 4.

State	Incumbent			Results	Candidates
State	Senator	Party	Electoral history	Results	Candidates
Illinois (Class 3)	James Shields	Democratic	1848 or 1849	Senate voided election March 15, 1849, as incumbent had not been a U.S. citizen long enough as required by the U.S. Constitution. Incumbent was re-elected October 27, 1849, having by then qualified. Democratic hold.	▌ ✓ James Shields (Democratic); [data missing]
Alabama (Class 2)	Benjamin Fitzpatrick	Democratic	1848 (appointed)	Interim appointee retired when successor elected or lost election to finish the term. New senator elected November 30, 1849. Democratic hold.	▌ ✓ Jeremiah Clemens (Democratic); [data missing]
California (Class 1)	None (new state)			California admitted as a state on September 9, 1850. Senator elected December 20, 1849 and seated upon statehood. Democratic gain.	▌ ✓ John C. Frémont (Democratic); [data missing]
California (Class 3)	None (new state)			California admitted as a state on September 9, 1850. Senator elected December 20, 1849 and seated upon statehood. Democratic gain.	▌ ✓ William M. Gwin (Democratic); [data missing]

== Individual elections ==
=== Maryland ===
1849 United States Senate election in Maryland
- December 1849

80 members of the Maryland General Assembly
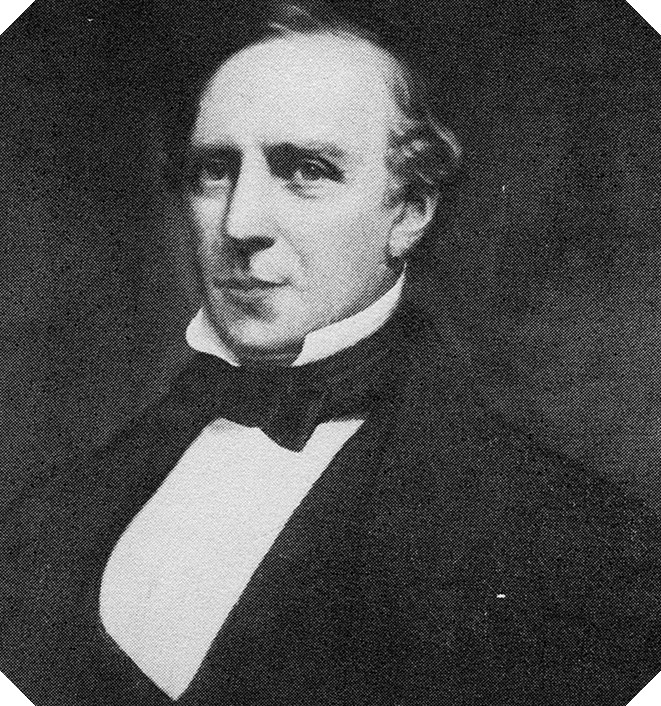
Candidate	David Stewart
Party	Democratic
Legislative vote	-
Percentage	-%

1849 United States Senate election in Maryland
- January 1849

80 members of the Maryland General Assembly
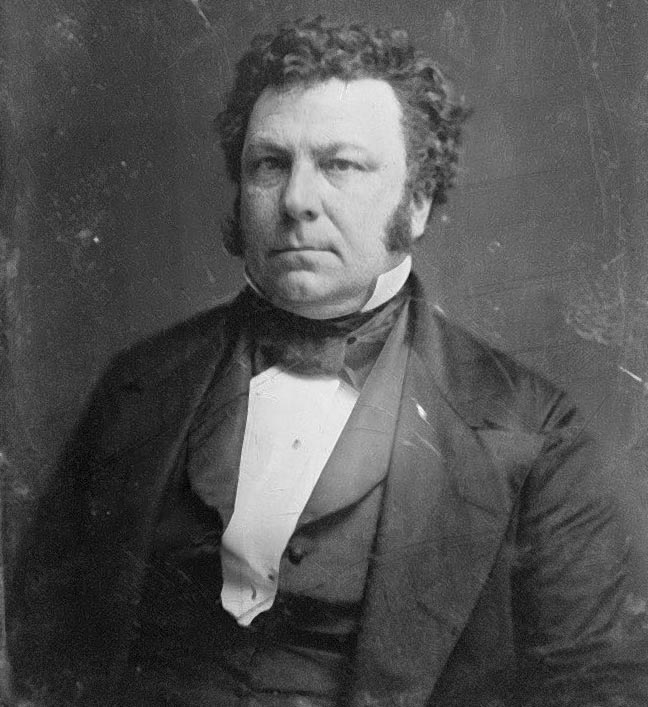
Candidate	James Pearce
Party	Whig
Legislative vote	-
Percentage	-%

Reverdy Johnson won election in 1844 but retired to become the United States Attorney General. In order to fill his seat, David Stewart was elected by an unknown margin of votes, for the Class 1 seat.

James Pearce won re-election by an unknown margin of votes, for the Class 3 seat.

=== New York ===
The New York election was held February 6, 1849. Barnburner John Adams Dix had been elected in 1845 to this seat after the resignation of Silas Wright, and Dix's term would expire on March 3, 1849. In November 1848, Dix was the Barnburners/Free-Soilers candidate for Governor of New York, but was defeated by Whig Hamilton Fish.

At this time New York Democratic Party was split in two fiercely opposing factions: the Barnburners" and the "Hunkers". The Barnburners organized the Free Soil Party in 1848 and nominated Martin Van Buren for U.S. President. Due to the split, the Whig Party won most of the elective offices by pluralities.

At the State election in November 1847, 24 Whigs and 8 Democrats were elected for a two-year term (1848–1849) in the State Senate. At the State election in November 1848, 106 Whigs, 15 Free Soilers and 7 Hunkers were elected to the Assembly for the session of 1849. The 72nd New York State Legislature met from January 2 to April 11, 1849, at Albany, New York.

Ex-Governor of New York William H. Seward was nominated by a caucus of Whig State legislators on February 1, 1849. The vote was 88 for Seward, 12 for John A. Collier, 18 scattering and 4 blanks. The incumbent U.S. Senator John Adams Dix ran for re-election supported by the Free Soilers. Ex-Chancellor Reuben H. Walworth was the candidate of the Hunkers. Walworth had been third place in the last gubernatorial election, behind Fish and Dix. Ex-Congressman Daniel D. Barnard (Whig) received 2 scattering votes in the Senate. William H. Seward was the choice of both the Assembly and the Senate, and was declared elected.

House	Whig		Free Soil		Dem./Hunker		Also ran	
State Senate (32 members)	William H. Seward	19	John Adams Dix	6	Reuben H. Walworth	2	Daniel D. Barnard	2
State Assembly (128 members)	William H. Seward	102	John Adams Dix	15	Reuben H. Walworth	7		

=== Ohio ===
The two houses of the Ohio General Assembly met in joint session February 22, 1849, with 72 representatives and 35 senators present to elect a Senator (Class 3) to succeed incumbent William Allen. On the fourth ballot, Salmon P. Chase was elected with a majority of the votes cast, as follows:

Ballot	William Allen	Thomas Ewing	Joshua Reed Giddings	Salmon P. Chase	Reuben Hitchcock	Emery D. Potter	David T. Disney	John C. Vaughn	Blank ballots	Total votes cast
1	27	41	9	14	1	2	1	0	11	106
2	1	41	8	52	0	0	0	0	4	108
3	0	39	9	53	0	0	0	2	2	105
4	0	39	11	55	0	0	0	1	0	106

The second ballot was declared a nullity by Speaker of the Senate Brewster Randall, because there were one more ballots cast than members present.

=== Pennsylvania ===
The Pennsylvania election was held January 10, 1849. James Cooper was elected by the Pennsylvania General Assembly.

Incumbent Democrat Simon Cameron, who was elected in 1845, was not a candidate for re-election to another term. The Pennsylvania General Assembly, consisting of the House of Representatives and the Senate, convened on January 10, 1849, to elect a new Senator to fill the term beginning on March 4, 1849. Three ballots were recorded. The results of the third and final ballot of both houses combined are as follows:

State Legislature results
Party	Candidate	Votes	%
Whig	James Cooper	66	49.62
Democratic	Richard Brodhead	62	46.62
Free Soil	Thaddeus Stevens	3	2.26
N/A	Not voting	2	1.50
Totals		133	100.00%

== See also ==
- 1848 United States elections
  - 1848 United States presidential election
  - 1848–49 United States House of Representatives elections
- 30th United States Congress
- 31st United States Congress
