= List of United States Senate election results by region =

The following table shows regularly scheduled United States Senate elections by region. The table does not include appointments or special elections.

== Legend ==
Label	Party	Label	Party	Label	Party	Label	Party	Label	Party
PA	Pro-Administration Faction	AJ	Anti-Jacksonian	FS	Free Soil Party	SR	Silver Republican Party	—	No regularly scheduled election
AA	Anti-Administration Faction	D	Democratic Party	A	American Party	FL	Farmer-Labor Party	I	Independent
F	Federalist Party	R	Republican Party	Po	Populist Party			Sp	Split result
DR	Democratic-Republican Party	Nu	Nullifier Party	U	Union				
J	Jacksonites	W	Whig Party	Ra	Readjuster Party				

== Northeast ==
					First Party System																	Second Party System															Third Party System																					Fourth Party System																			Fifth Party System																			Sixth Party System																												
State	1789	1789	1790	1792	1794	1796	1798	1800	1802	1804	1806	1808	1810	1812	1814	1816	1818	1820	1822	1824	1826	State	1828	1830	1832	1834	1836	1838	1840	1842	1844	1846	1848	1850	1852	1854	State	1856	1858	1860	1862	1864	1866	1868	1870	1872	1874	1876	1878	1880	1882	1884	1886	1888	1890	1892	1894	State	1896	1898	1900	1902	1904	1906	1908	1910	1912	1914	1916	1918	1920	1922	1924	1926	1928	1930	State	1932	1934	1936	1938	1940	1942	1944	1946	1948	1950	1952	1954	1956	1958	1960	1962	1964	1966	State	1968	1970	1972	1974	1976	1978	1980	1982	1984	1986	1988	1990	1992	1994	1996	1998	2000	2002	2004	2006	2008	2010	2012	2014	2016	2018	2020	State
Connecticut	PA	PA	PA	—	F	F	—	F	F	—	F	F	—	F	F	—	DR	DR	—	AJ	AJ	Connecticut	—	AJ	AJ	—	D	W	—	D	W	—	W	D	—	R	Connecticut	R	—	R	R	—	R	R	—	LR	D	—	R	R	—	R	R	—	R	R	—	Connecticut	R	R	—	R	R	—	R	R	—	R	R	—	R	R	—	R	R	—	Connecticut	D	D	—	R	D	—	D	R	—	D	R	—	R	D	—	D	D	—	Connecticut	D	R	—	D	R	—	D	R	—	D	D	—	D	D	—	D	D	—	D	I	—	D	D	—	D	D	—	Connecticut
Maine	Part of Massachusetts				Part of Massachusetts													2DR	DR	—	J	Maine	AJ	—	D	D	—	D	W	—	D	D	—	D	W	—	Maine	D	R	—	R	R	—	R	R	—	R	R	—	R	R	—	R	R	—	R	R	Maine	—	R	R	—	R	R	—	D	R	—	R	R	—	R	R	—	R	R	Maine	—	R	R	—	R	R	—	R	R	—	R	R	—	D	R	—	D	R	Maine	—	D	D	—	D	R	—	D	R	—	D	R	—	R	R	—	R	R	—	R	R	—	I	R	—	I	R	Maine
Massachusetts	PA	PA	PA	PA	—	F	F	—	F	F	—	F	DR	—	F	F	—	F	F	—	AJ	Massachusetts	AJ	—	AJ	W	—	W	W	—	W	W	—	FS	W	—	Massachusetts	R	R	—	R	R	—	R	R	—	R	R	—	R	R	—	R	R	—	R	R	Massachusetts	—	R	R	—	R	R	—	R	R	—	R	D	—	R	R	—	D	D	Massachusetts	—	D	R	—	D	R	—	R	R	—	D	R	—	D	R	—	D	R	Massachusetts	—	D	R	—	D	D	—	D	D	—	D	D	—	D	D	—	D	D	—	D	D	—	D	D	—	D	D	Massachusetts
New Hampshire	AA	AA	—	PA	DR	—	F	F	—	DR	DR	—	DR	F	—	DR	DR	—	DR	J	—	New Hampshire	AJ	D	—	D	D	—	D	D	—	FS	D	—	D	R	New Hampshire	—	R	R	—	R	R	—	R	R	—	R	R	—	R	R	—	R	R	—	R	New Hampshire	R	—	R	R	—	R	R	—	D	R	—	R	R	—	R	R	—	R	New Hampshire	D	—	R	R	—	R	R	—	R	R	—	R	R	—	R	R	—	D	New Hampshire	R	—	D	D	—	R	R	—	R	R	—	R	R	—	R	R	—	R	R	—	D	R	—	D	D	—	D	New Hampshire
New Jersey	PA	PA	F	F	—	F	F	—	DR	DR	—	DR	DR	—	DR	DR	—	DR	DR	—	AJ	New Jersey	AJ	—	AJ	D	—	W	W	—	W	W	—	D	D	—	New Jersey	D	R	—	D	D	—	D	R	—	D	D	—	R	D	—	D	D	—	D	R	New Jersey	—	R	R	—	R	R	—	D	D	—	R	R	—	D	R	—	R	R	New Jersey	—	D	D	—	R	R	—	R	R	—	R	R	—	D	R	—	D	R	New Jersey	—	D	R	—	D	D	—	D	D	—	D	D	—	D	D	—	D	D	—	D	D	—	D	D	—	D	D	New Jersey
New York	PA	PA	AA	—	F	F	—	DR	DR	—	DR	DR	—	F	DR	—	F	DR	—	AJ	J	New York	—	D	D	—	D	D	—	D	W	—	W	W	—	R	New York	R	—	R	R	—	R	R	—	R	D	—	R	R	—	R	R	—	D	D	—	New York	R	R	—	R	R	—	R	D	—	R	R	—	R	D	—	D	D	—	New York	D	D	—	D	D	—	D	R	—	D	R	—	R	R	—	R	D	—	New York	R	C	—	R	D	—	R	D	—	R	D	—	R	D	—	D	D	—	D	D	—	D	D	—	D	D	—	New York
Pennsylvania	AA	PA	AA	—	F	F	—	DR	DR	—	DR	DR	—	DR	DR	—	DR	DR	—	AJ	J	Pennsylvania	—	D	D	—	D	D	—	D	D	—	W	D	—	D	Pennsylvania	R	—	R	D	—	R	R	—	R	D	—	R	R	—	R	R	—	R	R	—	Pennsylvania	R	R	—	R	R	—	R	R	—	R	R	—	R	R	—	R	R	—	Pennsylvania	R	D	—	R	D	—	D	R	—	R	R	—	D	R	—	D	R	—	Pennsylvania	R	R	—	R	R	—	R	R	—	R	R	—	R	R	—	R	R	—	R	D	—	R	D	—	R	D	—	Pennsylvania
Rhode Island	PA	AA	PA	PA	—	F	F	—	DR	DR	—	F	DR	—	F	F	—	DR	DR	—	AJ	Rhode Island	AJ	—	AJ	W	—	W	W	—	W	W	—	D	D	—	Rhode Island	R	R	—	R	R	—	R	R	—	R	R	—	R	R	—	R	R	—	R	R	Rhode Island	—	R	R	—	R	R	—	R	R	—	D	R	—	D	R	—	R	R	Rhode Island	—	D	D	—	D	D	—	D	D	—	D	D	—	D	D	—	D	D	Rhode Island	—	D	D	—	R	D	—	R	D	—	R	D	—	R	D	—	R	D	—	D	D	—	D	D	—	D	D	Rhode Island
Vermont			2AA	—	F	F	—	F	DR	—	DR	DR	—	DR	F	—	DR	DR	—	AJ	AJ	Vermont	—	AJ	AJ	—	W	W	—	W	W	—	W	W	—	W	Vermont	R	—	R	R	—	R	R	—	R	R	—	R	R	—	R	R	—	R	R	—	Vermont	R	R	—	R	R	—	R	R	—	R	R	—	R	R	—	R	R	—	Vermont	R	R	—	R	R	—	R	R	—	R	R	—	R	R	—	R	R	—	Vermont	R	R	—	D	R	—	D	R	—	D	R	—	D	R	—	D	R	—	D	I	—	D	I	—	D	I	—	Vermont
State	1st	1st	2nd	3rd	4th	5th	6th	7th	8th	9th	10th	11th	12th	13th	14th	15th	16th	17th	18th	19th	20th	State	21st	22nd	23rd	24th	25th	26th	27th	28th	29th	30th	31st	32nd	33rd	34th	State	35th	36th	37th	38th	39th	40th	41st	42nd	43rd	44th	45th	46th	47th	48th	49th	50th	51st	52nd	53rd	54th	State	55th	56th	57th	58th	59th	60th	61st	62nd	63rd	64th	65th	66th	67th	68th	69th	70th	71st	72nd	State	73rd	74th	75th	76th	77th	78th	79th	80th	81st	82nd	83rd	84th	85th	86th	87th	88th	89th	90th	State	91st	92nd	93rd	94th	95th	96th	97th	98th	99th	100th	101st	102nd	103rd	104th	105th	106th	107th	108th	109th	110th	111th	112th	113th	114th	115th	116th	117th	State

== South ==
					First Party System																	Second Party System															Third Party System			Civil War and Reconstruction									Third Party System									Fourth Party System																			Fifth Party System																			Sixth Party System																												
State	1789	1789	1790	1792	1794	1796	1798	1800	1802	1804	1806	1808	1810	1812	1814	1816	1818	1820	1822	1824	1826	State	1828	1830	1832	1834	1836	1838	1840	1842	1844	1846	1848	1850	1852	1854	State	1856	1858	1860	1862	1864	1866	1868	1870	1872	1874	1876	1878	1880	1882	1884	1886	1888	1890	1892	1894	State	1896	1898	1900	1902	1904	1906	1908	1910	1912	1914	1916	1918	1920	1922	1924	1926	1928	1930	State	1932	1934	1936	1938	1940	1942	1944	1946	1948	1950	1952	1954	1956	1958	1960	1962	1964	1966	State	1968	1970	1972	1974	1976	1978	1980	1982	1984	1986	1988	1990	1992	1994	1996	1998	2000	2002	2004	2006	2008	2010	2012	2014	2016	2018	2020	State
Alabama																	2DR	—	DR	J	—	Alabama	D	D	—	D	D	—	D	D	—	D	D	—	D	D	Alabama	—	D	—	—	—	—	2R	D	R	—	D	D	—	D	D	—	D	D	—	D	Alabama	D	—	D	D	—	D	D	—	D	D	—	D	D	—	D	D	—	D	Alabama	D	—	D	D	—	D	D	—	D	D	—	D	D	—	D	D	—	D	Alabama	D	—	D	D	—	D	R	—	D	D	—	D	D	—	R	R	—	R	R	—	R	R	—	R	R	—	R	Alabama
Arkansas																						Arkansas					2D	—	D	D	—	D	D	—	D	D	Arkansas	—	D	D	—	—	—	2R	R	R	—	D	D	—	D	D	—	D	D	—	D	Arkansas	D	—	D	D	—	D	D	—	D	D	—	D	D	—	D	D	—	D	Arkansas	D	—	D	D	—	D	D	—	D	D	—	D	D	—	D	D	—	D	Arkansas	D	—	D	D	—	D	D	—	D	D	—	D	D	—	R	D	—	D	D	—	D	R	—	R	R	—	R	Arkansas
Delaware	PA	AA	PA	PA	—	F	F	—	F	F	—	F	F	—	F	F	—	F	F	—	J	Delaware	AJ	—	AJ	W	—	W	W	—	W	W	—	D	W	—	Delaware	D	D	—	D	D	—	D	D	—	D	D	—	D	D	—	D	R	—	D	D	Delaware	—	R	R	—	R	R	—	R	D	—	D	R	—	D	R	—	R	R	Delaware	—	R	D	—	D	R	—	R	D	—	R	D	—	R	R	—	R	R	Delaware	—	R	D	—	R	D	—	R	D	—	R	D	—	R	D	—	D	D	—	D	D	—	D	D	—	D	D	Delaware
Florida																						Florida									2D	—	W	D	—	D	Florida	D	—	—	—	—	—	2R	—	R	D	—	D	D	—	D	D	—	D	D	—	Florida	D	D	—	D	D	—	D	D	—	D	D	—	D	D	—	D	D	—	Florida	D	D	—	D	D	—	D	D	—	D	D	—	D	D	—	D	D	—	Florida	R	D	—	D	D	—	R	D	—	D	R	—	D	R	—	D	D	—	R	D	—	R	D	—	R	R	—	Florida
Georgia	AA	AA	—	AA	F	—	DR	DR	—	DR	DR	—	DR	DR	—	DR	DR	—	DR	J	—	Georgia	D	D	—	D	D	—	W	D	—	W	W	—	D	D	Georgia	—	D	—	—	—	R	—	D	D	—	D	D	—	D	D	—	D	D	—	D	Georgia	D	—	D	D	—	D	D	—	D	D	—	D	D	—	D	D	—	D	Georgia	D	—	D	D	—	D	D	—	D	D	—	D	D	—	D	D	—	D	Georgia	D	—	D	D	—	D	R	—	D	D	—	D	R	—	D	R	—	R	R	—	R	R	—	R	R	—		Georgia
Kentucky	Part of Virginia			2AA	F	—	DR	DR	—	DR	DR	—	DR	DR	—	DR	DR	—	DR	J	—	Kentucky	D	AJ	—	W	W	—	W	W	—	W	W	—	W	W	Kentucky	—	D	D	—	D	D	—	D	D	—	D	D	—	D	D	—	D	D	—	D	Kentucky	R	—	D	D	—	D	R	—	D	D	—	D	R	—	R	D	—	D	Kentucky	D	—	D	D	—	D	D	—	D	D	—	D	R	—	R	R	—	R	Kentucky	R	—	D	D	—	D	D	—	R	D	—	R	D	—	R	R	—	R	R	—	R	R	—	R	R	—	R	Kentucky
Louisiana														2DR	—	DR	DR	—	DR	AJ	—	Louisiana	D	D	—	D	D	—	W	W	—	D	D	—	W	D	Louisiana	—	D	—	—	—	—	2R	R	D	—	R	D	—	D	D	—	D	D	—	D	Louisiana	D	—	D	D	—	D	D	—	D	D	—	D	D	—	D	D	—	D	Louisiana	D	—	D	D	—	D	D	—	D	D	—	D	D	—	D	D	—	D	Louisiana	D	—	D	D	—	D	D	—	D	D	—	D	D	—	D	D	—	D	R	—	D	R	—	R	R	—	R	Louisiana
Maryland	PA	PA	PA	—	F	F	—	DR	DR	—	DR	DR	—	F	F	—	DR	DR	—	J	J	Maryland	—	AJ	AJ	—	W	W	—	W	W	—	W	W	—	W	Maryland	A	—	D	U	—	D	D	—	D	D	—	D	D	—	D	D	—	D	D	—	Maryland	R	R	—	D	D	—	D	D	—	D	R	—	R	D	—	D	R	—	Maryland	D	D	—	D	D	—	D	D	—	R	R	—	R	R	—	D	D	—	Maryland	R	R	—	R	D	—	R	D	—	D	D	—	D	D	—	D	D	—	D	D	—	D	D	—	D	D	—	Maryland
Mississippi																2DR	—	DR	DR	—	J	Mississippi	D	—	AJ	D	—	W	D	—	D	D	—	D	D	—	Mississippi	D	D	—	—	—	—	—	2R	—	R	D	—	D	D	—	D	D	—	D	D	Mississippi	—	D	D	—	D	D	—	D	D	—	D	D	—	D	D	—	D	D	Mississippi	—	D	D	—	D	D	—	D	D	—	D	D	—	D	D	—	D	D	Mississippi	—	D	D	—	D	R	—	D	R	—	R	R	—	R	R	—	R	R	—	R	R	—	R	R	—	R	R	Mississippi
North Carolina	PA	PA	—	AA	DR	—	DR	DR	—	DR	DR	—	DR	DR	—	DR	DR	—	DR	J	—	North Carolina	D	D	—	D	D	—	W	D	—	W	W	—	D	D	North Carolina	—	D	D	—	—	—	2R	D	D	—	D	D	—	D	D	—	D	D	—	Po	North Carolina	R	—	D	D	—	D	D	—	D	D	—	D	D	—	D	D	—	D	North Carolina	D	—	D	D	—	D	D	—	D	D	—	D	D	—	D	D	—	D	North Carolina	D	—	R	D	—	R	R	—	R	D	—	R	R	—	R	D	—	R	R	—	D	R	—	R	R	—	R	North Carolina
Oklahoma																						Oklahoma															Oklahoma																					Oklahoma						2D	D	—	D	D	—	D	R	—	R	D	—	D	Oklahoma	D	—	D	D	—	R	D	—	D	D	—	D	D	—	D	D	—	D	Oklahoma	R	—	R	R	—	D	R	—	D	R	—	D	R	—	R	R	—	R	R	—	R	R	—	R	R	—	R	Oklahoma
South Carolina	PA	PA	—	AA	F	—	DR	DR	—	DR	DR	—	DR	DR	—	DR	DR	—	DR	J	—	South Carolina	D	Nu	—	Nu	W	—	D	D	—	D	D	—	D	D	South Carolina	—	D	—	—	—	—	2R	R	R	—	D	D	—	D	D	—	D	D	—	D	South Carolina	D	—	D	D	—	D	D	—	D	D	—	D	D	—	D	D	—	D	South Carolina	D	—	D	D	—	D	D	—	D	D	—	D	D	—	D	D	—	R	South Carolina	D	—	R	D	—	R	D	—	R	D	—	R	D	—	R	D	—	R	R	—	R	R	—	R	R	—	R	South Carolina
Tennessee						2DR	DR	—	DR	DR	—	DR	DR	—	DR	DR	—	DR	DR	—	J	Tennessee	D	—	D	W	—	D	W	—	D	W	—	W	W	—	Tennessee	D	D	—	—	—	Sp	R	D	—	D	D	—	D	D	—	D	D	—	D	D	Tennessee	—	D	D	—	D	D	—	D	D	—	D	D	—	D	D	—	D	D	Tennessee	—	D	D	—	D	D	—	D	D	—	D	D	—	D	D	—	D	R	Tennessee	—	R	R	—	D	R	—	D	D	—	D	D	—	R	R	—	R	R	—	R	R	—	R	R	—	R	R	Tennessee
Texas																						Texas										2D	—	D	D	—	Texas	D	D	—	—	—	—	—	2R	—	D	D	—	D	D	—	D	D	—	D	D	Texas	—	D	D	—	D	D	—	D	D	—	D	D	—	D	D	—	D	D	Texas	—	D	D	—	D	D	—	D	D	—	D	D	—	D	D	—	D	R	Texas	—	D	R	—	D	R	—	D	R	—	D	R	—	R	R	—	R	R	—	R	R	—	R	R	—	R	R	Texas
Virginia	AA	AA	AA	AA	—	DR	DR	—	DR	DR	—	DR	DR	—	DR	DR	—	DR	DR	—	J	Virginia	D	—	AJ	W	—	W	W	—	D	D	—	D	D	—	Virginia	D	D	—	U	N	—	—	Sp	—	D	D	—	Ra	Ra	—	D	D	—	D	D	Virginia	—	D	D	—	D	D	—	D	D	—	D	D	—	D	D	—	D	D	Virginia	—	D	D	—	D	D	—	D	D	—	D	D	—	D	D	—	D	D	Virginia	—	I	R	—	I	R	—	R	R	—	D	R	—	D	R	—	R	R	—	D	D	—	D	D	—	D	D	Virginia
West Virginia	Part of Virginia				Part of Virginia																	West Virginia	Part of Virginia														West Virginia				2U	R	—	R	D	—	D	D	—	D	D	—	D	D	—	D	R	West Virginia	—	R	R	—	R	R	—	D	R	—	R	R	—	D	R	—	R	D	West Virginia	—	D	D	—	D	R	—	D	D	—	D	D	—	D	D	—	D	D	West Virginia	—	D	D	—	D	D	—	D	D	—	D	D	—	D	D	—	D	D	—	D	D	—	D	R	—	D	R	West Virginia
State	1st	1st	2nd	3rd	4th	5th	6th	7th	8th	9th	10th	11th	12th	13th	14th	15th	16th	17th	18th	19th	20th	State	21st	22nd	23rd	24th	25th	26th	27th	28th	29th	30th	31st	32nd	33rd	34th	State	35th	36th	37th	38th	39th	40th	41st	42nd	43rd	44th	45th	46th	47th	48th	49th	50th	51st	52nd	53rd	54th	State	55th	56th	57th	58th	59th	60th	61st	62nd	63rd	64th	65th	66th	67th	68th	69th	70th	71st	72nd	State	73rd	74th	75th	76th	77th	78th	79th	80th	81st	82nd	83rd	84th	85th	86th	87th	88th	89th	90th	State	91st	92nd	93rd	94th	95th	96th	97th	98th	99th	100th	101st	102nd	103rd	104th	105th	106th	107th	108th	109th	110th	111th	112th	113th	114th	115th	116th	117th	State

== Midwest ==
First Party System														Second Party System															Third Party System																					Fourth Party System																			Fifth Party System																			Sixth Party System																												
State	1802	1804	1806	1808	1810	1812	1814	1816	1818	1820	1822	1824	1826	State	1828	1830	1832	1834	1836	1838	1840	1842	1844	1846	1848	1850	1852	1854	State	1856	1858	1860	1862	1864	1866	1868	1870	1872	1874	1876	1878	1880	1882	1884	1886	1888	1890	1892	1894	State	1896	1898	1900	1902	1904	1906	1908	1910	1912	1914	1916	1918	1920	1922	1924	1926	1928	1930	State	1932	1934	1936	1938	1940	1942	1944	1946	1948	1950	1952	1954	1956	1958	1960	1962	1964	1966	State	1968	1970	1972	1974	1976	1978	1980	1982	1984	1986	1988	1990	1992	1994	1996	1998	2000	2002	2004	2006	2008	2010	2012	2014	2016	2018	2020	State
Illinois									2DR	—	DR	J	—	Illinois	D	D	—	D	D	—	D	D	—	D	D	—	D	D	Illinois	—	D	R	—	R	R	—	R	R	—	I	R	—	R	R	—	R	D	—	R	Illinois	R	—	R	R	—	R	R	—	D	R	—	R	R	—	R	R	—	D	Illinois	D	—	D	D	—	R	D	—	D	R	—	D	R	—	D	R	—	R	Illinois	R	—	R	D	—	R	D	—	D	D	—	D	D	—	D	R	—	D	D	—	D	R	—	D	D	—	D	Illinois
Indiana								2DR	DR	DR	—	AJ	AJ	Indiana	—	AJ	D	—	W	W	—	D	D	—	D	D	—	D	Indiana	D	—	R	D	—	R	R	—	R	D	—	D	R	—	D	D	—	D	D	—	Indiana	R	R	—	R	R	—	D	D	—	D	R	—	R	D	—	R	R	—	Indiana	D	D	—	D	R	—	R	R	—	R	R	—	R	D	—	D	D	—	Indiana	D	D	—	D	R	—	R	R	—	R	R	—	R	R	—	D	R	—	D	R	—	R	D	—	R	R	—	Indiana
Iowa														Iowa											2D	—	D	FS	Iowa	—	R	R	—	R	R	—	R	R	—	R	R	—	R	R	—	R	R	—	R	Iowa	R	—	R	R	—	R	R	—	R	R	—	R	R	—	R	R	—	R	Iowa	D	—	D	D	—	R	R	—	D	R	—	R	R	—	R	R	—	R	Iowa	D	—	D	D	—	R	R	—	D	R	—	D	R	—	D	R	—	D	R	—	D	R	—	R	R	—	R	Iowa
Kansas														Kansas															Kansas			2R	—	R	R	—	R	R	—	R	R	—	R	R	—	R	Po	—	R	Kansas	Po	—	R	R	—	R	R	—	D	R	—	R	R	—	R	R	—	R	Kansas	D	—	R	R	—	R	R	—	R	R	—	R	R	—	R	R	—	R	Kansas	R	—	R	R	—	R	R	—	R	R	—	R	R	—	R	R	—	R	R	—	R	R	—	R	R	—	R	Kansas
Michigan														Michigan					2D	W		—	D	D	—	D	D	—	Michigan	R	R	—	R	R	—	R	R	—	R	R	—	R	R	—	R	R	—	R	R	Michigan	—	R	R	—	R	R	—	R	R	—	R	R	—	D	R	—	R	R	Michigan	—	R	D	—	R	R	—	R	R	—	R	D	—	D	D	—	D	R	Michigan	—	D	R	—	D	D	—	D	D	—	D	D	—	R	D	—	D	D	—	D	D	—	D	D	—	D	D	Michigan
Minnesota														Minnesota															Minnesota		Sp	—	R	R	—	R	R	—	R	R	—	R	R	—	R	R	—	R	R	Minnesota	—	R	R	—	R	R	—	R	R	—	R	R	—	FL	R	—	FL	R	Minnesota	—	FL	FL	—	R	R	—	R	D	—	R	D	—	D	D	—	D	D	Minnesota	—	D	D	—	D	R	—	R	R	—	R	D	—	R	D	—	D	R	—	D	D	—	D	D	—	D	D	Minnesota
Missouri										2DR	—	AJ	J	Missouri	—	D	D	—	D	D	—	D	D	—	D	W	—	D	Missouri	D	—	D	U	—	R	R	—	D	D	—	D	D	—	D	D	—	D	D	—	Missouri	D	D	—	D	R	—	D	D	—	D	D	—	R	D	—	D	R	—	Missouri	D	D	—	D	D	—	R	R	—	D	D	—	D	D	—	D	D	—	Missouri	D	D	—	D	R	—	D	R	—	R	R	—	R	R	—	R	R	—	R	D	—	R	D	—	R	R	—	Missouri
Nebraska														Nebraska															Nebraska						2R	R	R	—	R	R	—	R	R	—	R	R	—	Po	R	Nebraska	—	R	R	—	R	R	—	D	R	—	D	R	—	R	R	—	R	R	Nebraska	—	D	I	—	R	R	—	R	R	—	R	R	—	R	R	—	R	R	Nebraska	—	R	R	—	D	D	—	D	D	—	D	D	—	D	R	—	D	R	—	D	R	—	R	R	—	R	R	Nebraska
North Dakota														North Dakota															North Dakota																	2R	R	D	—	North Dakota	R	R	—	R	R	—	R	R	—	R	R	—	R	R	—	R	R	—	North Dakota	R	R	—	R	R	—	D	R	—	R	R	—	R	R	—	R	D	—	North Dakota	R	D	—	R	D	—	R	D	—	D	D	—	D	D	—	D	D	—	D	D	—	R	D	—	R	R	—	North Dakota
Ohio	2DR	—	DR	DR	—	DR	DR	—	DR	DR	—	AJ	AJ	Ohio	—	AJ	D	—	D	D	—	D	W	—	FS	W	—	D	Ohio	R	—	R	R	—	R	D	—	R	D	—	D	R	—	D	R	—	D	R	—	Ohio	R	R	—	R	R	—	R	D	—	R	D	—	R	R	—	R	R	—	Ohio	D	D	—	R	R	—	R	R	—	R	R	—	D	D	—	D	D	—	Ohio	R	R	—	D	D	—	D	D	—	D	D	—	D	R	—	R	R	—	R	D	—	R	D	—	R	D	—	Ohio
South Dakota														South Dakota															South Dakota																	2R	I	—	R	South Dakota	Po	—	R	R	—	R	R	—	R	D	—	R	R	—	R	R	—	D	South Dakota	R	—	D	R	—	R	R	—	R	R	—	R	R	—	R	D	—	R	South Dakota	D	—	D	D	—	R	R	—	R	D	—	R	D	—	D	D	—	D	R	—	D	R	—	R	R	—	R	South Dakota
Wisconsin														Wisconsin											2D	D	—	R	Wisconsin	R	—	R	R	—	R	R	—	R	R	—	R	R	—	R	R	—	D	D	—	Wisconsin	R	R	—	R	R	—	R	R	—	D	R	—	R	R	—	R	R	—	Wisconsin	D	Pr	—	R	R	—	R	R	—	R	R	—	R	D	—	D	D	—	Wisconsin	D	D	—	D	D	—	R	D	—	R	D	—	D	D	—	D	D	—	D	D	—	R	D	—	R	D	—	Wisconsin
State	8th	9th	10th	11th	12th	13th	14th	15th	16th	17th	18th	19th	20th	State	21st	22nd	23rd	24th	25th	26th	27th	28th	29th	30th	31st	32nd	33rd	34th	State	35th	36th	37th	38th	39th	40th	41st	42nd	43rd	44th	45th	46th	47th	48th	49th	50th	51st	52nd	53rd	54th	State	55th	56th	57th	58th	59th	60th	61st	62nd	63rd	64th	65th	66th	67th	68th	69th	70th	71st	72nd	State	73rd	74th	75th	76th	77th	78th	79th	80th	81st	82nd	83rd	84th	85th	86th	87th	88th	89th	90th	State	91st	92nd	93rd	94th	95th	96th	97th	98th	99th	100th	101st	102nd	103rd	104th	105th	106th	107th	108th	109th	110th	111th	112th	113th	114th	115th	116th	117th	State

== West ==
Second Party System				Third Party System																				Fourth Party System																			Fifth Party System																			Sixth Party System																												
State	1850	1852	1854	1856	1858	1860	1862	1864	1866	1868	1870	1872	1874	1876	1878	1880	1882	1884	1886	1888	1890	1892	1894	State	1896	1898	1900	1902	1904	1906	1908	1910	1912	1914	1916	1918	1920	1922	1924	1926	1928	1930	State	1932	1934	1936	1938	1940	1942	1944	1946	1948	1950	1952	1954	1956	1958	1960	1962	1964	1966	State	1968	1970	1972	1974	1976	1978	1980	1982	1984	1986	1988	1990	1992	1994	1996	1998	2000	2002	2004	2006	2008	2010	2012	2014	2016	2018	2020	State
Alaska																								Alaska																			Alaska														2D	D	D	—	D	Alaska	D	—	R	D	—	R	R	—	R	R	—	R	R	—	R	R	—	R	R	—	D	R	—	R	R	—		Alaska
Arizona																								Arizona									2D	D	D	—	R	D	—	D	D	—	Arizona	D	D	—	D	D	—	D	D	—	D	R	—	D	R	—	D	R	—	Arizona	R	R	—	R	D	—	R	D	—	R	D	—	R	R	—	R	R	—	R	R	—	R	R	—	R	D	—	Arizona
California	2D	—	D	D	—	D	R	—	R	D	—	R	AM	—	D	R	—	R	D	—	R	D	—	California	R	R	—	R	R	—	R	R	—	D	R	—	R	R	—	R	R	—	California	D	R	—	D	R	—	D	R	—	R	R	—	R	D	—	R	R	—	California	D	D	—	D	R	—	D	R	—	D	R	—	D	D	—	D	D	—	D	D	—	D	D	—	D	D	—	California
Colorado														2R	R	—	R	R	—	R	SR	—	R	Colorado	D	—	D	D	—	R	D	—	D	D	—	R	R	—	R	R	—	D	Colorado	D	—	D	D	—	D	R	—	D	R	—	R	D	—	R	R	—	R	Colorado	R	—	D	D	—	R	D	—	R	D	—	R	R	—	R	R	—	R	D	—	D	D	—	R	D	—	D	Colorado
Hawaii																								Hawaii																			Hawaii														Sp	—	R	R	—	Hawaii	D	R	—	D	D	—	D	D	—	D	D	—	D	D	—	D	D	—	D	D	—	D	D	—	D	D	—	Hawaii
Idaho																					2R	—	R	Idaho	Po	—	SR	R	—	R	R	—	R	R	—	R	R	—	R	R	—	R	Idaho	D	—	R	D	—	R	D	—	D	R	—	R	D	—	R	D	—	R	Idaho	D	—	R	D	—	R	R	—	R	R	—	R	R	—	R	R	—	R	R	—	R	R	—	R	R	—	R	Idaho
Montana																				2R	—	R	R	Montana	—	D	D	—	R	R	—	D	D	—	D	D	—	D	D	—	D	D	Montana	—	D	D	—	D	D	—	R	D	—	D	D	—	D	D	—	D	D	Montana	—	D	D	—	D	D	—	D	D	—	R	D	—	R	D	—	R	D	—	D	D	—	D	R	—	D	R	Montana
Nevada								2R	R	R	—	R	R	—	R	D	—	R	R	—	R	SR	—	Nevada	Si	SR	—	D	R	—	D	R	—	D	D	—	R	D	—	R	D	—	Nevada	D	D	—	D	D	—	D	R	—	D	R	—	D	D	—	D	D	—	Nevada	D	D	—	R	D	—	R	R	—	D	D	—	D	D	—	D	R	—	D	R	—	D	R	—	D	D	—	Nevada
New Mexico																								New Mexico									2R	—	D	R	—	D	D	—	R	D	New Mexico	—	R	D	—	D	D	—	D	D	—	D	D	—	D	D	—	D	D	New Mexico	—	D	R	—	R	R	—	D	R	—	D	R	—	D	R	—	D	R	—	D	D	—	D	D	—	D	D	New Mexico
Oregon					2D	R	—	R	R	—	D	R	—	D	D	—	R	R	—	R	R	—	R	Oregon	R	—	R	R	—	R	D	—	D	D	—	R	R	—	R	R	—	R	Oregon	R	—	R	R	—	R	R	—	R	R	—	D	D	—	D	D	—	R	Oregon	R	—	R	R	—	R	R	—	R	R	—	R	R	—	R	D	—	R	D	—	D	D	—	D	D	—	D	Oregon
Utah																								Utah	Sp	R	—	R	R	—	R	R	—	R	D	—	R	D	—	R	D	—	Utah	D	D	—	D	D	—	D	R	—	R	R	—	R	D	—	R	D	—	Utah	R	D	—	R	R	—	R	R	—	R	R	—	R	R	—	R	R	—	R	R	—	R	R	—	R	R	—	Utah
Washington																				2R	R	R	—	Washington	R	R	—	R	R	—	R	R	—	R	R	—	R	D	—	R	D	—	Washington	D	D	—	D	D	—	D	R	—	D	D	—	D	D	—	D	D	—	Washington	D	D	—	D	D	—	R	D	—	D	R	—	D	R	—	D	D	—	D	D	—	D	D	—	D	D	—	Washington
Wyoming																					2R	R	R	Wyoming	—	R	R	—	R	R	—	R	R	—	D	R	—	D	R	—	D	R	Wyoming	—	D	D	—	D	R	—	D	D	—	R	D	—	D	R	—	D	R	Wyoming	—	D	R	—	R	R	—	R	R	—	R	R	—	R	R	—	R	R	—	R	R	—	R	R	—	R	R	Wyoming
State	32nd	33rd	34th	35th	36th	37th	38th	39th	40th	41st	42nd	43rd	44th	45th	46th	47th	48th	49th	50th	51st	52nd	53rd	54th	State	55th	56th	57th	58th	59th	60th	61st	62nd	63rd	64th	65th	66th	67th	68th	69th	70th	71st	72nd	State	73rd	74th	75th	76th	77th	78th	79th	80th	81st	82nd	83rd	84th	85th	86th	87th	88th	89th	90th	State	91st	92nd	93rd	94th	95th	96th	97th	98th	99th	100th	101st	102nd	103rd	104th	105th	106th	107th	108th	109th	110th	111th	112th	113th	114th	115th	116th	117th	State

== See also ==
- List of United States presidential election results by state
- Party divisions of United States Congresses
- List of special elections to the United States Senate
