= 1844–45 United States Senate elections =

- Various dates
- Class 1

18 of the 54 seats in the United States Senate (with special elections) 28 seats needed for a majority
	Majority party	Minority party	Third party
Party	Democratic	Whig	Law and Order
Last election	23 seats	27 seats	New party
Seats before	23	27	1
Seats won	8	8	0
Seats after	27	24	0
Seat change	▲3	▼3	▼1
Seats up	5	11	1
- Results: Democratic gain Democratic hold Whig gain Whig hold Legislature failed to elect
Majority Party before election
Whig
Elected Majority Party
Democratic

The 1844–45 United States Senate elections were held on various dates in various states, coinciding with James K. Polk's election. As these U.S. Senate elections were prior to the ratification of the Seventeenth Amendment in 1913, senators were chosen by state legislatures. Senators were elected over a wide range of time throughout 1844 and 1845, and a seat may have been filled months late or remained vacant due to legislative deadlock.

In these elections, terms were up for the senators in Class 1. The Democratic Party re-captured control of the Senate, gaining a net total of eleven seats from the Whigs.

== Results summary ==
Senate party division, 29th Congress (1845–1847)

- Majority party: Democratic (26–31)
- Minority party: Whig (24)
- Other parties: (0–1)
- Vacant: (4–2)
- Total seats: 54–58

== Change in Senate composition ==
=== Before the elections ===
				D_{1}	D_{2}	D_{3}	D_{4}	D_{5}	D_{6}
D_{16}	D_{15}	D_{14}	D_{13}	D_{12}	D_{11}	D_{10}	D_{9}	D_{8}	D_{7}
D_{17}	D_{18}	D_{19}	D_{20} Ran	D_{21} Ran	D_{22} Ran	D_{23} Ran	D_{24} Retired	LO_{1} Retired	W_{27} Retired
Majority →									W_{27} Retired
W_{17} Ran	W_{18} Ran	W_{19} Ran	W_{20} Ran	W_{21} Unknown	W_{22} Unknown	W_{23} Retired	W_{24} Retired	W_{25} Retired	W_{26} Retired
W_{16}	W_{15}	W_{14}	W_{13}	W_{12}	W_{11}	W_{10}	W_{9}	W_{8}	W_{7}
				W_{1}	W_{2}	W_{3}	W_{4}	W_{5}	W_{6}

=== Result of the elections ===
			D_{1}	D_{2}	D_{3}	D_{4}	D_{5}	D_{6}	D_{7}
D_{17}	D_{16}	D_{15}	D_{14}	D_{13}	D_{12}	D_{11}	D_{10}	D_{9}	D_{8}
D_{18}	D_{19}	D_{20} Re-elected	D_{21} Re-elected	D_{22} Re-elected	D_{23} Re-elected	D_{24} Gain	D_{25} Gain	D_{26} Gain	D_{27} Gain
Majority →									D_{27} Gain
W_{18} Re-elected	W_{19} Re-elected	W_{20} Hold	W_{21} Hold	W_{22} Hold	W_{23} Gain	W_{24} Gain	V_{1} W Loss	V_{2} New seat	V_{3} New seat
W_{17} Re-elected	W_{16}	W_{15}	W_{14}	W_{13}	W_{12}	W_{11}	W_{10}	W_{9}	W_{8}
			W_{1}	W_{2}	W_{3}	W_{4}	W_{5}	W_{6}	W_{7}

=== Beginning of the next Congress ===
			D_{1}	D_{2}	D_{3}	D_{4}	D_{5}	D_{6}	D_{7}
D_{17}	D_{16}	D_{15}	D_{14}	D_{13}	D_{12}	D_{11}	D_{10}	D_{9}	D_{8}
D_{18}	D_{19}	D_{20}	D_{21}	D_{22}	D_{23}	D_{24}	D_{25}	D_{26}	V_{4} D Loss
Majority ↑									V_{4} D Loss
W_{18}	W_{19}	W_{20}	W_{21}	W_{22}	W_{23}	W_{24}	V_{1}	V_{2}	V_{3}
W_{17}	W_{16}	W_{15}	W_{14}	W_{13}	W_{12}	W_{11}	W_{10}	W_{9}	W_{8}
			W_{1}	W_{2}	W_{3}	W_{4}	W_{5}	W_{6}	W_{7}

=== Beginning of the first session of the next Congress (December 1, 1845) ===
			D_{1}	D_{2}	D_{3}	D_{4}	D_{5}	D_{6}	D_{7}
D_{17}	D_{16}	D_{15}	D_{14}	D_{13}	D_{12}	D_{11}	D_{10}	D_{9}	D_{8}
D_{18}	D_{19}	D_{20}	D_{21}	D_{22}	D_{23}	D_{24} Hold	D_{25} Hold	D_{26} Hold	D_{27} Gain
Majority →									D_{28} Gain
W_{18}	W_{19}	W_{20}	W_{21}	W_{22}	W_{23} Hold	W_{24} Hold	D_{30} Gain	D_{29} Gain	D_{28} Gain
W_{17}	W_{16}	W_{15}	W_{14}	W_{13}	W_{12}	W_{11}	W_{10}	W_{9}	W_{8}
			W_{1}	W_{2}	W_{3}	W_{4}	W_{5}	W_{6}	W_{7}

Key:

D_{#}	Democratic
LO_{#}	Law and Order
W_{#}	Whig
V_{#}	Vacant

== Race summaries ==
=== Special elections during the 28th Congress ===
In these special elections, the winners were seated during 1844 or in 1845 before March 4; ordered by election date.

State	Incumbent			Results	Candidates
State	Senator	Party	Electoral history	Results	Candidates
Rhode Island (Class 1)	William Sprague	Whig	1842 (special)	Incumbent resigned January 17, 1844. New senator elected January 25, 1844. Law and Order gain. Winner was not a candidate for the next term; see below.	▌ ✓ John B. Francis (Law and Order) 67; ▌ Christopher Spencer (Liberation) 26
Louisiana (Class 3)	Alexander Porter	Whig	1833 (special); 1837 (resigned); 1843	Incumbent died January 13, 1844. New senator elected January 29, 1844 on the second ballot. Whig hold.	▌ ✓ Henry Johnson (Whig) 39; ▌Joseph Marshall Walker (Democratic) 36; Blank 2
Arkansas (Class 2)	William S. Fulton	Democratic	1836 (special); 1840	Incumbent died August 15, 1844. New senator elected November 8, 1844. Democratic hold.	▌ ✓ Chester Ashley (Democratic); [data missing]
Missouri (Class 3)	David Rice Atchison	Democratic	1843 (appointed)	Interim appointee elected November 20, 1844.	▌ ✓ David Rice Atchison (Democratic) 101; ▌Henry S. Geyer (Whig) 17; ▌[FNU] Leonard (unknown) 9; ▌[FNU] Biggs (unknown) 1; ▌Sinclair Kirtley (unknown) 1; ▌John Scott (Whig) 1; ▌Uriel Wright (Whig) 1
Alabama (Class 2)	Dixon H. Lewis	Democratic	1844 (appointed)	Interim appointee elected December 7, 1844.	▌ ✓ Dixon H. Lewis (Democratic) 85; ▌Arthur F. Hopkins (Whig) 42
Illinois (Class 2)	James Semple	Democratic	1843 (appointed)	Interim appointee elected December 11, 1844.	▌ ✓ James Semple (Democratic) 102; ▌John J. Hardin (Whig) 47
New York (Class 1)	Daniel S. Dickinson	Democratic	1844 (appointed)	Interim appointee elected January 18, 1845. Winner later elected to the next term; see below.	▌ ✓ Daniel S. Dickinson (Democratic) 27; ▌Millard Fillmore (Whig) 3; ▌Jonathan Thompson (American Republican) 1
New York (Class 3)	Henry A. Foster	Democratic	1844 (appointed)	Interim appointee retired or lost election. New senator elected January 18, 1845. Democratic hold.	▌ ✓ John Adams Dix (Democratic) 27; ▌Willis Hall (Whig) 3; ▌Harman B. Cropsey (American Republican) 1

=== Races leading to the 29th Congress ===
In these regular elections, the winners were elected for the term beginning March 4, 1845; ordered by state.

All of the elections involved the Class 1 seats.

State	Incumbent			Results	Candidates
State	Senator	Party	Electoral history	Results	Candidates
Connecticut	Jabez W. Huntington	Whig	1840 (special)	Incumbent re-elected in 1844 or 1845.	▌ ✓ Jabez W. Huntington (Whig); [data missing]
Delaware	Richard H. Bayard	Whig	1836 (special); 1838 or 1839; 1839 (resigned); 1841 (special)	Incumbent retired. New senator elected in 1845. Whig hold.	▌ ✓ John M. Clayton (Whig); [data missing]
Florida	None (new state)			Florida was admitted March 3, 1845, but elected its first Class 1 senator late, during the next Congress. Seat remained vacant.	None.
Indiana	Albert White	Whig	1838	Incumbent retired. New senator elected in 1844. Democratic gain.	▌ ✓ Jesse D. Bright (Democratic); [data missing]
Maine	John Fairfield	Democratic	1843 (special)	Incumbent re-elected in 1844 or 1845.	▌ ✓ John Fairfield (Democratic); [data missing]
Maryland	William Merrick	Whig	1838 (special); 1839	Incumbent retired. New senator elected in 1844 or 1845. Whig hold.	▌ ✓ Reverdy Johnson (Whig); [data missing]
Massachusetts	Rufus Choate	Whig	1841 (special)	Incumbent retired. New senator elected in 1845. Whig hold.	▌ ✓ Daniel Webster (Whig); [data missing]
Michigan	Augustus S. Porter	Whig	1840 (special)	Incumbent retired. New senator elected in 1844 or 1845. Democratic gain.	▌ ✓ Lewis Cass (Democratic); [data missing]
Mississippi	John Henderson	Whig	1838	Unknown if incumbent retired or lost. New senator elected in 1844. Democratic gain.	▌ ✓ Jesse Speight (Democratic); [data missing]
Missouri	Thomas H. Benton	Democratic	1821 (new state); 1827; 1833; 1839	Incumbent re-elected November 20, 1844.	▌ ✓ Thomas H. Benton (Democratic) 74; ▌Thomas B. English (unknown) 32; ▌Abiel Leonard (Whig) 7; ▌Alexander W. Doniphan (unknown) 4; ▌William M. Campbell (unknown) 3; ▌Henry S. Geyer (Whig) 2; ▌John G. Miller (Whig) 2; ▌Thomas L. Anderson (Whig) 1; ▌Edward Bates (Whig) 1; ▌Frederick Hyatt (unknown) 1; ▌Trusten Polk (Democratic) 1; ▌Rio Santo (unknown) 1; ▌Fleming Saunders (unknown) 1; ▌Richard Roe (unknown) 1
New Jersey	William L. Dayton	Whig	1842 (appointed); 1842 (special)	Incumbent re-elected in 1845.	▌ ✓ William L. Dayton (Whig) 46; ▌John R. Thomson (Democratic) 10; ▌Elias Van Arsdale, Sr. (Democratic) 8
New York	Daniel S. Dickinson	Democratic	1844 (appointed); 1845 (special)	Incumbent re-elected February 4, 1845.	▌ ✓ Daniel S. Dickinson (Democratic) 25; ▌John C. Clark (Whig) 4
Ohio	Benjamin Tappan	Democratic	1838	Incumbent retired. New senator elected December 5, 1844. Whig gain.	▌ ✓ Thomas Corwin (Whig) 60; ▌David T. Disney (Democratic) 46; ▌Ebenezer Lane (unknown) 1
Pennsylvania	Daniel Sturgeon	Democratic	1840 (late)	Incumbent re-elected January 14, 1845.	▌ ✓ Daniel Sturgeon (Democratic) 72; ▌James Cooper (Whig) 49; ▌John Ashmead (Know Nothing) 5; ▌E. W. Keyser (Know Nothing) 2; ▌Jacob Broom (Know Nothing) 1; ▌E. C. Reigert (Know Nothing) 1; ▌John Sergeant (Whig) 1; Not voting 2
Rhode Island	John B. Francis	Law and Order	1844 (special)	Incumbent retired. New senator January 15, 1845 on the second ballot. Whig gain.	▌ ✓ Albert C. Greene (Whig) 52; ▌Lemuel H. Arnold (Whig) 25; ▌Olney Ballou (Democratic) 18; ▌John H. Clarke (Whig) 4; ▌S.F. Man (unknown) 1
Tennessee	Ephraim H. Foster	Whig	1837 (early); 1838 (appointed); 1839 (declined to serve); 1843 (special)	Incumbent retired. Legislature failed to elect. Whig loss.	[data missing]
Vermont	Samuel S. Phelps	Whig	1839	Incumbent re-elected in 1845.	▌ ✓ Samuel S. Phelps (Whig); [data missing]
Virginia	William C. Rives	Whig	1832 (special); 1834 (resigned); 1836 (special); 1839 (failure to elect); 1841 (late)	Legislature failed to elect. Whig loss.	[data missing]

=== Special elections during the 29th Congress ===
In these special elections, the winners were elected in 1845 after March 4; ordered by election date.

State	Incumbent			Results	Candidates
State	Senator	Party	Electoral history	Results	Candidates
Pennsylvania (Class 3)	James Buchanan	Democratic	1834 (special); 1836; 1843	Incumbent resigned March 5, 1845, to become U.S. secretary of state. New senator elected March 13, 1845. Democratic hold.	▌ ✓ Simon Cameron (Democratic) 50.38%; ▌George W. Woodward (Democratic) 41.35%; ▌J. R. Ingersoll (Whig) 1.50%; ▌John Banks (Whig) 0.75%; ▌Peter A. Brown (Know Nothing) 0.75%; ▌Thomas S. Bell (unknown) 0.75%; ▌T. D. Cochran (Whig) 0.75%; Not voting 3.76%
Massachusetts (Class 2)	Isaac C. Bates	Whig	1841 (special); 1841	Incumbent died March 16, 1845. New senator elected March 24, 1845. Whig hold.	▌ ✓ John Davis (Whig); [data missing]
Florida (Class 1)	None (new state)			Florida was admitted March 3, 1845. Its first senators were elected July 1, 1845. Democratic gain.	▌ ✓ David Levy Yulee (Democratic); [data missing]
Florida (Class 3)	None (new state)			Florida was admitted March 3, 1845. Its first senators were elected July 1, 1845. Democratic gain.	▌ ✓ James Westcott (Democratic); [data missing]
Tennessee (Class 1)	Vacant			Legislature had failed to elect. New senator elected late October 25, 1845 on the fourteenth ballot. Democratic gain.	▌ ✓ Hopkins L. Turney (Democratic) 53; ▌William C. Dunlap (unknown) 46
Georgia (Class 2)	John M. Berrien	Whig	1825; 1829 (resigned); 1840	Incumbent resigned in May 1845 to become judge of the Supreme Court of Georgia. He did not remain on the court, and was re-elected November 13, 1845. Whig hold.	▌ ✓ John M. Berrien (Whig); [data missing]
South Carolina (Class 2)	Vacant			Incumbent Daniel E. Huger (D) had resigned in the previous Congress. New senator was elected November 26, 1845. Democratic hold.	▌ ✓ John C. Calhoun (Democratic); [data missing]
Virginia (Class 1)	Vacant			Legislature had failed to elect. New senator elected late December 3, 1845. Democratic gain.	▌ ✓ Isaac S. Pennybacker (Democratic); [data missing]

== Maryland ==
1844 United States Senate election in Maryland
80 members of the Maryland General Assembly
Candidate	Reverdy Johnson
Party	Whig
Legislative vote	-
Percentage	-%

Reverdy Johnson won election by an unknown margin of votes, for the Class 1 seat.

== New York ==
There were three elections. Two special elections were held on January 18, 1845, and one regular election was held on February 4, 1845.

The 68th New York State Legislature met from January 7 to May 14, 1845.

=== New York (special, class 1) ===
Nathaniel P. Tallmadge had been re-elected in 1840 to the Class 1 seat (term 1839–1845), but resigned June 17, 1844, to become governor of Wisconsin Territory. On November 30, Governor of New York William C. Bouck appointed his Democratic Lieutenant Governor Daniel S. Dickinson to fill the vacancy temporarily, and Dickinson was seated December 9, 1844.

January 18, 1845, United States senator special election, Class 1
House	Democratic		Whig		American Republican	
State Senate (32 members)	✓ Daniel S. Dickinson	27	Millard Fillmore	3	Jonathan Thompson	1
State Assembly (128 members)	✓ Daniel S. Dickinson					

=== New York (special, class 3) ===
Silas Wright Jr. had been re-elected in 1843 to the Class 3 seat (term 1843–1849), but resigned November 26, 1844, when elected governor of New York. On November 30, Governor Bouck appointed Democratic State Senator Henry A. Foster to fill the vacancy temporarily, and Foster took his seat on December 9, 1844.

January 18, 1845, United States senator special election, Class 3
House	Democratic		Whig		American Republican	
State Senate (32 members)	✓ John Adams Dix	27	Willis Hall	3	Harman B. Cropsey	1
State Assembly (128 members)	✓ John Adams Dix					

Dix took his seat on January 27, 1845, and remained in office until March 3, 1849, when his term expired.

=== New York (regular) ===
February 4, 1845, United States senator election, Class 1
House	Democratic		Whig	
State Senate (32 members)	✓ Daniel S. Dickinson	25	John C. Clark	4
State Assembly (128 members)	✓ Daniel S. Dickinson			

Dickinson re-took his seat under the new credentials on January 27, 1845, was re-elected, and remained in office until March 3, 1851, when his term expired.

== Pennsylvania ==
=== Pennsylvania (regular) ===
The regular election was held on January 14, 1845. Incumbent Daniel Sturgeon was re-elected by the Pennsylvania General Assembly to the United States Senate. The Pennsylvania General Assembly, consisting of the House of Representatives and the Senate, convened on January 14, 1845, to elect a senator to serve the term beginning on March 4, 1845. The results of the vote of both houses combined are as follows:

State legislature results
Party	Candidate	Votes	%
Democratic	Daniel Sturgeon (incumbent)	72	54.14
Whig	James Cooper	49	36.84
Know Nothing	John Ashmead	5	3.76
Know Nothing	E. W. Keyser	2	1.50
Know Nothing	Jacob Broom	1	0.75
Know Nothing	E. C. Reigert	1	0.75
Whig	John Sergeant	1	0.75
N/A	Not voting	2	1.50
Totals		133	100.00%

=== Pennsylvania (special) ===
A special election was held on March 13, 1845. Simon Cameron was elected by the Pennsylvania General Assembly to the United States Senate. Democratic future-U.S. president James Buchanan was elected in an 1834 special election, and was re-elected in 1836 and 1843.

Senator Buchanan resigned on March 5, 1845, after being appointed U.S. secretary of state by President James K. Polk.

Following the resignation of senator Buchanan, the Pennsylvania General Assembly convened on March 13, 1845, to elect a new senator to fill the vacancy and serve the remainder of the term set to expire on March 4, 1849. Five ballots were recorded. The results of the fifth and final ballot of both houses combined are as follows:

State legislature results
Party	Candidate	Votes	%
Democratic	Simon Cameron	67	50.38
Democratic	George W. Woodward	55	41.35
Whig	J. R. Ingersoll	2	1.50
Whig	John Banks	1	0.75
Know Nothing	Peter A. Brown	1	0.75
Unknown	Thomas S. Bell	1	0.75
Whig	T. D. Cochran	1	0.75
N/A	Not voting	5	3.76
Totals		133	100.00%

== See also ==
- 1844 United States elections
  - 1844 United States presidential election
  - 1844–45 United States House of Representatives elections
- 29th United States Congress
- 30th United States Congress

== Sources and external links ==
- Party Division in the Senate, 1789-Present, via Senate.gov
- Members of the 28th United States Congress, via GPOaccess.gov
- Members of the 29th United States Congress, via GPOaccess.gov
- Pennsylvania Election Statistics: 1682-2006 from the Wilkes University Election Statistics Project
- Taylor, William Alexander; Taylor, Aubrey Clarence (1899). Ohio statesmen and annals of progress: from the year 1788 to the year 1900. State of Ohio.
- The New York Civil List compiled in 1858 (see: pg. 63 for U.S. Senators; pg. 134f for State Senators 1845; pg. 230f for Members of Assembly 1845)
- Political History of the State of New York, from Jan. 1, 1841, to Jan. 1, 1847; Vol. III by Jabez Delano Hammond (State election, 1844: pg. 505f; appointments, 1844: pg. 508f; Speaker election, 1845: pg. 518; U.S. Senate nominations, 1845: pg. 526ff) [gives wrong date for caucus, and election]
- Abridgment of the Debates in Congress, from 1789 to 1856: Dec. 4, 1843 to June 18, 1846 (page 197)
- Journal of the Senate (68th Session) (1845; pg. 77f and 142f)
