= Electoral history of James Buchanan =

Elections featuring President of the US

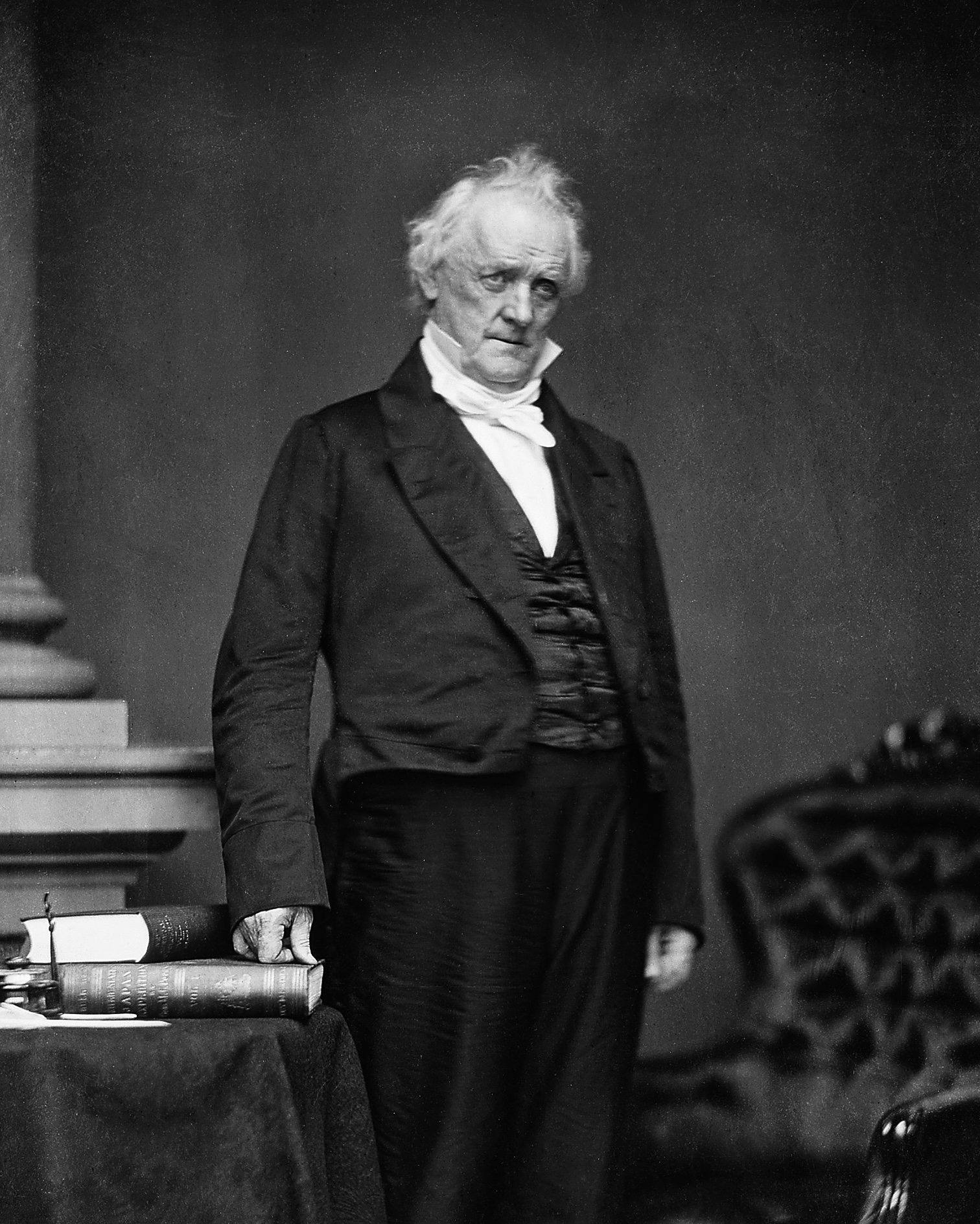
James Buchanan

This is the electoral history of James Buchanan. He was the 15th president of the United States (1856-1860); 17th United States Secretary of State; United States Minister to the United Kingdom and Russia; U.S. representative from Pennsylvania's third (1821-1823) and fourth congressional district (1823-1831); and U.S. senator from Pennsylvania (1834-1845).

== United States House of Representatives elections ==
=== 1820 ===
1820 United States House of Representatives elections in Pennsylvania Pennsylvania-3 (Plural district with 2 seats)
Party	Candidate	Votes	%
Federalist	James Buchanan	7,809	27.9
Federalist	John Phillips	7,709	27.5
Democratic-Republican	Jacob Hibshman	6,396	22.8
Democratic-Republican	James M. Wallace	6,100	21.8

=== 1822 ===
1822 United States House of Representatives elections in Pennsylvania Pennsylvania-4 (Plural district with 3 seats)
Party	Candidate	Votes	%
Jacksonian	James Buchanan	7,021	18.6
Jacksonian	Isaac Wayne	6,870	18.2
Jacksonian	Samuel Edwards	6,839	18.1
Democratic-Republican	William Darlington	5,723	15.2
Democratic-Republican	William Anderson	5,646	15.0
Democratic-Republican	Jacob Hibshman	5,639	14.9

=== 1824 ===
1824 United States House of Representatives elections in Pennsylvania Pennsylvania-4 (Plural district with 3 seats)
Party	Candidate	Votes	%
Jacksonian	James Buchanan	6,968	18.0
Jacksonian	Samuel Edwards	6,802	17.5
Anti-Jacksonian	Charles Miner	6,756	17.4
Democratic-Republican	Isaac D. Barnard	6,129	15.8
Democratic-Republican	William Anderson	6,098	15.7
Democratic-Republican	Samuel Houston	6,028	15.5

=== 1826 ===
1826 United States House of Representatives elections in Pennsylvania Pennsylvania-4 (Plural district with 3 seats)
Party	Candidate	Votes	%
Jacksonian	James Buchanan	5,950	18.5
Anti-Jacksonian	Samuel Anderson	5,732	17.8
Anti-Jacksonian	Charles Miner	5,670	17.6
Jacksonian	Joshua Evans Jr.	4,983	15.5
Jacksonian	John McCamant	4,933	15.3
Jacksonian	George Gray Leiper	4,902	15.2

=== 1828 ===
1828 United States House of Representatives elections in Pennsylvania Pennsylvania-4 (Plural district with 3 seats)
Party	Candidate	Votes	%
Jacksonian	James Buchanan	10,004	17.6
Jacksonian	Joshua Evans Jr.	9,932	17.5
Jacksonian	George Gray Leiper	9,538	17.4
Anti-Jacksonian	Samuel Anderson	9,023	15.9
Anti-Jacksonian	Townsend Haines	9,006	15.9
Anti-Jacksonian	William Hiester	8,957	15.8

== United States Senate election ==
=== 1834 ===
1834 United States Senate special election in Pennsylvania State Legislature Results
Party	Candidate	Votes	%
Democratic	James Buchanan	66	49.62
Anti-Masonic	Amos Ellmaker	31	23.31
Democratic	James Clarke	26	19.55
National Republican	Joseph Lawrence	6	4.51
Democratic	Joel Sutherland	1	0.75
N/A	Not voting	3	2.26
Totals		133	100.00%

=== 1836 ===
1836 United States Senate election in Pennsylvania State Legislature Results
Party	Candidate	Votes	%
Democratic	James Buchanan	85	63.91
Whig	Thomas M. T. McKennan	24	18.05
Whig	Charles B. Penrose	21	15.79
Democratic	Thomas Cunningham	1	0.75
Democratic	Isaac Leet	1	0.75
N/A	Not voting	1	0.75
Totals		133	100.00%

=== 1843 ===
1843 United States Senate election in Pennsylvania State Legislature Results
Party	Candidate	Votes	%
Democratic	James Buchanan	74	56.06
Whig	John Banks	54	40.91
Democratic	Richard Brodhead	1	0.76
Unknown	John Gibons	1	0.76
N/A	Not voting	2	1.52
Totals		132	100.00%

== Democratic National Conventions ==
=== 1844 ===
1844 Democratic National Convention
Ballots	1	2	3	4	5	6	7	8	9 (Note: before shifts)	9 (Note: after shifts)
Martin Van Buren	146	127	121	111	103	101	99	104	2	0
Lewis Cass	83	94	92	105	107	116	123	114	29	0
Richard M. Johnson	24	33	38	32	29	23	21	0	0	0
James Buchanan	4	9	11	17	26	25	22	2	0	0
John C. Calhoun	6	1	2	1	1	1	1	2	2	0
Levi Woodbury	2	0	2	0	0	0	0	0	0	0
Charles Stewart	1	1	0	0	0	0	0	0	0	0
Marcus Morton	0	0	0	0	0	0	0	0	1	0
James K. Polk	0	0	0	0	0	0	0	44	231	266
Blank	0	1	0	0	0	0	0	0	1	0

=== 1848 ===
1848 Democratic National Convention
Ballots	1	2	3	4
Lewis Cass	125	133	156	179
Levi Woodbury	53	56	53	38
James Buchanan	55	54	40	33
John C. Calhoun	9	0	0	0
William Jenkins Worth	6	5	5	1
George M. Dallas	3	3	0	0
William Orlando Butler	0	0	0	3
Abstaining	39	39	36	36

=== 1852 ===
1852 Democratic National Convention Presidential Ballot
Ballot	1st	2nd	3rd	4th	5th	6th	7th	8th	9th	10th	11th	12th	13th	14th	15th	16th	17th	18th	19th	20th	21st	22nd	23rd	24th	25th
Franklin Pierce	0	0	0	0	0	0	0	0	0	0	0	0	0	0	0	0	0	0	0	0	0	0	0	0	0
Lewis Cass	116	118	119	115	114	114	113	113	112	111	101	98	98	99	99	99	99	96	89	81	60	43	37	33	34
James Buchanan	93	95	94	89	89	88	88	88	87	86	87	88	88	87	87	87	87	85	85	92	102	104	103	103	101
William L. Marcy	27	27	26	25	26	26	26	26	27	27	27	27	26	26	26	26	26	25	26	26	26	26	26	26	26
Stephen A. Douglas	20	23	21	31	34	32	34	34	39	40	50	52	51	51	51	51	50	56	63	64	64	77	78	80	79
William Butler	2	1	1	1	1	1	1	1	1	1	1	1	1	1	1	1	1	1	1	1	13	15	20	23	24
Daniel S. Dickinson	1	1	0	0	1	1	1	1	1	1	1	1	1	1	1	1	1	1	1	1	1	1	1	1	1
Joseph Lane	13	13	13	13	13	13	13	13	13	14	13	13	13	13	13	13	13	13	13	13	13	13	13	13	13
Sam Houston	8	6	7	7	8	8	9	9	8	8	8	9	10	10	10	10	9	11	9	10	9	9	10	9	10
John B. Weller	4	0	0	0	0	0	0	0	0	0	0	0	0	0	0	0	0	0	0	0	0	0	0	0	0
Henry Dodge	3	3	3	3	3	0	3	3	0	0	0	0	0	0	0	0	0	0	0	0	0	0	0	0	0
Linn Boyd	0	0	0	0	0	0	0	0	0	0	0	0	0	0	0	0	0	0	0	0	0	0	0	0	0
William R. King	0	0	0	0	0	0	0	0	0	0	0	0	0	0	0	0	0	0	0	0	0	0	0	0	0
Charles Ingersoll	0	0	0	0	0	0	0	0	0	0	0	0	0	0	0	0	0	0	0	0	0	0	0	0	0
Blank	9	9	12	12	7	13	8	8	8	8	8	7	8	8	8	8	10	8	9	8	8	8	8	8	8

Presidential Ballot
Ballot	26th	27th	28th	29th	30th	31st	32nd	33rd	34th	35th	36th	37th	38th	39th	40th	41st	42nd	43rd	44th	45th	46th	47th	48th	49th
Franklin Pierce	0	0	0	0	0	0	0	0	0	15	30	29	29	29	29	29	29	29	29	29	44	49	55	283
Lewis Cass	33	32	28	27	33	65	98	123	130	131	122	120	107	106	107	107	101	101	101	96	78	75	72	2
James Buchanan	101	98	96	93	91	83	74	72	49	39	28	28	28	28	27	27	27	27	27	27	28	28	28	0
William Marcy	26	26	26	26	26	26	26	25	33	44	58	70	84	85	85	85	91	91	91	97	98	95	89	0
Stephen Douglas	80	85	88	91	92	92	80	60	53	52	43	34	33	33	33	33	33	33	33	32	32	33	33	2
William Butler	24	24	25	25	20	17	1	1	1	1	1	1	1	1	1	1	1	1	1	1	1	1	1	1
Daniel S. Dickinson	1	1	1	1	1	1	1	1	16	1	1	1	1	1	1	1	1	1	1	1	1	1	1	0
Joseph Lane	13	13	13	13	13	0	0	0	0	0	0	0	0	0	0	0	0	0	0	0	0	0	0	0
Sam Houston	10	9	11	12	12	9	8	6	5	5	5	5	5	5	5	5	5	5	5	5	5	5	6	1
Linn Boyd	0	0	0	0	0	0	0	0	0	0	0	0	0	0	0	0	0	0	0	0	0	1	2	0
William R. King	0	0	0	0	0	0	0	0	0	0	0	0	0	0	0	0	0	0	0	0	1	0	0	0
Charles Ingersoll	0	0	0	0	0	0	0	0	0	0	0	0	0	0	0	0	0	0	0	0	0	0	1	0
Blank	8	8	8	8	8	3	8	8	9	8	8	8	8	8	8	8	8	8	8	8	8	8	8	7

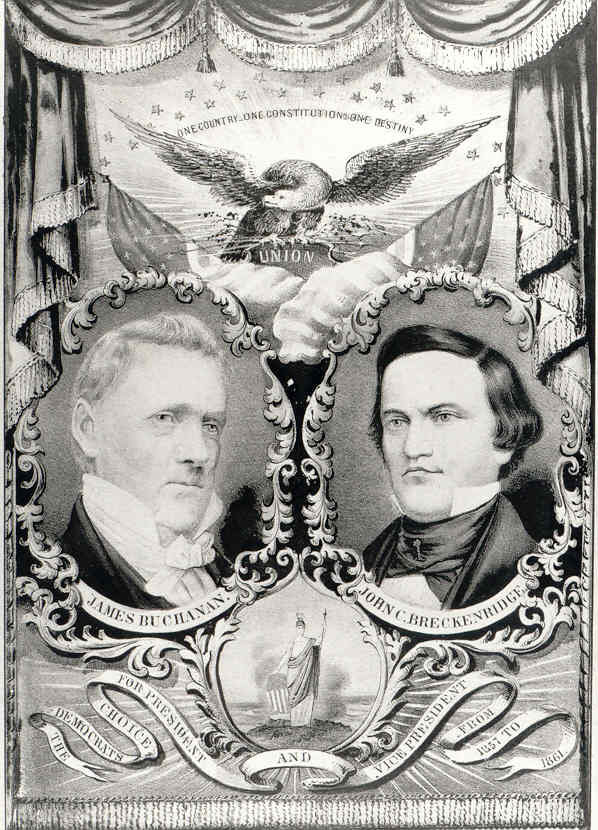
Buchanan - Breckinridge campaign poster

=== 1856 ===
1856 Democratic National Convention
Presidential Ballot
Ballot	1st	2nd	3rd	4th	5th	6th	7th	8th	9th	10th	11th	12th	13th	14th	15th	16th	17th
James Buchanan	135.5	139	139.5	141.5	140	155	143.5	147.5	146	147.5	147.5	148	150	152.5	168.5	168	296
Franklin Pierce	122.5	119.5	119	119	119.5	107.5	89	87	87	80.5	80	79	77.5	75	3.5	0	0
Stephen Douglas	33	31.5	32	30	31	28	58	56	56	62.5	63	63.5	63	63	118.5	122	0
Lewis Cass	5	6	5.5	5.5	5.5	5.5	5.5	5.5	7	5.5	5.5	5.5	5.5	5.5	4.5	6	0

1st Presidential Ballot

2nd Presidential Ballot

3rd Presidential Ballot

4th Presidential Ballot

5th Presidential Ballot

6th Presidential Ballot

7th Presidential Ballot

8th Presidential Ballot

9th Presidential Ballot

10th Presidential Ballot

11th Presidential Ballot

12th Presidential Ballot

13th Presidential Ballot

14th Presidential Ballot

15th Presidential Ballot

16th Presidential Ballot

17th and Final Presidential Ballot

== 1856 United States presidential election ==
Presidential election results map. Blue denotes states won by Buchanan/Breckinridge, red by Frémont/Dayton, and lilac by Fillmore/Donelson. Numbers indicate the number of electoral votes cast by each state.

Electoral results
Presidential candidate	Party	Home state	Popular vote^{(a)}		Electoral vote	Running mate		
Presidential candidate	Party	Home state	Count	Percentage	Electoral vote	Vice-presidential candidate	Home state	Electoral vote
James Buchanan Jr.	Democratic	Pennsylvania	1,836,072	45.28%	174	John Cabell Breckinridge	Kentucky	174
John Charles Frémont	Republican	California	1,342,345	33.11%	114	William Lewis Dayton	New Jersey	114
Millard Fillmore	American	New York	873,053	21.53%	8	Andrew Jackson Donelson	Tennessee	8
Other			3,177	0.08%	—	Other		—
Total			4,054,647	100%	296			296
Needed to win					149			149

Source (Popular Vote): Leip, David. "1856 Presidential Election Results". Dave Leip's Atlas of U.S. Presidential Elections. Source (Electoral Vote): "Electoral College Box Scores 1789–1996". National Archives and Records Administration.

^{(a)} The popular vote figures exclude South Carolina where the Electors were chosen by the state legislature rather than by popular vote.
