= 1842–43 United States Senate elections =

- Various dates
- Class 3

17 of the 52 seats in the United States Senate (with special elections) 27 seats needed for a majority
	Majority party	Minority party
Party	Whig	Democratic
Last election	29 seats	22 seats
Seats before	30	20
Seats won	4	13
Seats after	27	23
Seat change	▼3	▲3
Seats up	7	10
- Results: Democratic gain Democratic hold Whig hold
Majority Party before election
Whig
Elected Majority Party
Whig

The 1842–43 United States Senate elections were held on various dates in various states. As these U.S. Senate elections were prior to the ratification of the Seventeenth Amendment in 1913, senators were chosen by state legislatures. Senators were elected over a wide range of time throughout 1842 and 1843, and a seat may have been filled months late or remained vacant due to legislative deadlock. In these elections, terms were up for the senators in Class 3.

The Whigs lost seats but maintained control of the Senate. Although they lost three seats in the regular elections, they gained two of them back by the start of the first session in special elections.

== Results summary ==
Senate party division, 28th Congress (1843–1845)

- Majority party: Whig (27)
- Minority party: Democratic (22–23)
- Other parties: (0–1)
- Total seats: 52–54

== Change in Senate composition ==
=== Before the elections ===
After July 1842 appointment in New Jersey.

				D_{1}	D_{2}	D_{3}	D_{4}	D_{5}	D_{6}
D_{16} Ran	D_{15} Ran	D_{14} Ran	D_{13} Ran	D_{12} Ran	D_{11} Ran	D_{10}	D_{9}	D_{8}	D_{7}
D_{17} Unknown	D_{18} Unknown	D_{19} Retired	D_{20} Retired	V_{2}	V_{1}	W_{30} Resigned	W_{29} Retired	W_{28} Unknown	W_{27} Unknown
Majority →									W_{26} Ran
W_{17}	W_{18}	W_{19}	W_{20}	W_{21}	W_{22}	W_{23}	W_{24} Ran	W_{25} Ran	W_{26} Ran
W_{16}	W_{15}	W_{14}	W_{13}	W_{12}	W_{11}	W_{10}	W_{9}	W_{8}	W_{7}
				W_{1}	W_{2}	W_{3}	W_{4}	W_{5}	W_{6}

=== Result of the elections ===
				D_{1}	D_{2}	D_{3}	D_{4}	D_{5}	D_{6}
D_{16} Re-elected	D_{15} Re-elected	D_{14} Re-elected	D_{13} Re-elected	D_{12} Re-elected	D_{11} Re-elected	D_{10}	D_{9}	D_{8}	D_{7}
D_{17} Re-elected	D_{18} Hold	D_{19} Hold	D_{20} Hold	D_{21} Hold	D_{22} Gain	D_{23} Gain	V_{2}	V_{1}	W_{27} Hold
Majority →									W_{26} Hold
W_{17}	W_{18}	W_{19}	W_{20}	W_{21}	W_{22}	W_{23}	W_{24} Re-elected	W_{25} Re-elected	W_{26} Hold
W_{16}	W_{15}	W_{14}	W_{13}	W_{12}	W_{11}	W_{10}	W_{9}	W_{8}	W_{7}
				W_{1}	W_{2}	W_{3}	W_{4}	W_{5}	W_{6}

=== Beginning of the next Congress ===
				D_{1}	D_{2}	D_{3}	D_{4}	D_{5}	D_{6}
D_{16}	D_{15}	D_{14}	D_{13}	D_{12}	D_{11}	D_{10}	D_{9}	D_{8}	D_{7}
D_{17}	D_{18}	D_{19}	D_{20}	D_{21}	D_{22}	V_{3} D Loss	V_{2}	V_{1}	W_{27}
Majority →									W_{26}
W_{17}	W_{18}	W_{19}	W_{20}	W_{21}	W_{22}	W_{23}	W_{24}	W_{25}	W_{26}
W_{16}	W_{15}	W_{14}	W_{13}	W_{12}	W_{11}	W_{10}	W_{9}	W_{8}	W_{7}
				W_{1}	W_{2}	W_{3}	W_{4}	W_{5}	W_{6}

=== Beginning of the first session of the next Congress (December 4, 1843) ===
				D_{1}	D_{2}	D_{3}	D_{4}	D_{5}	D_{6}
D_{16}	D_{15}	D_{14}	D_{13}	D_{12}	D_{11}	D_{10}	D_{9}	D_{8}	D_{7}
D_{17}	D_{18}	D_{19}	D_{20}	D_{21} Hold	D_{22} Hold	D_{23} Gain	W_{29} Gain	W_{28} Gain	W_{27}
Majority →									W_{26}
W_{17}	W_{18}	W_{19}	W_{20}	W_{21}	W_{22}	W_{23}	W_{24}	W_{25}	W_{26}
W_{16}	W_{15}	W_{14}	W_{13}	W_{12}	W_{11}	W_{10}	W_{9}	W_{8}	W_{7}
				W_{1}	W_{2}	W_{3}	W_{4}	W_{5}	W_{6}

Key:

D_{#}	Democratic
W_{#}	Whig
V_{#}	Vacant

== Race summaries ==
Bold states link to specific election articles.

=== Special elections during the 27th Congress ===
In these elections, the winners were elected during 1842 or in 1843 before March 4; ordered by election date.

State	Incumbent			Results	Candidates
State	Senator	Party	Electoral history	Results	Candidates
Rhode Island (Class 1)	Nathan F. Dixon	Whig	1838	Incumbent died January 29, 1842. New senator elected February 5, 1842 on the third ballot. Whig hold.	▌ ✓ William Sprague (Whig) 44; ▌Lemuel H. Arnold (Whig) 24; ▌[FNU] Potter (Unknown) 9; ▌John H. Clarke (Whig) 2; ▌[FNU] Cranston (Unknown) 1
Kentucky (Class 3)	Henry Clay	Whig	1806 (special); 1807 (retired); 1810 (special); 1811 (retired); 1831 (late); 1836	Incumbent resigned March 31, 1842. New senator elected February 25, 1842. Whig hold. Winner later re-elected to the next term; see below.	▌ ✓ John J. Crittenden (Whig) 120
Louisiana (Class 3)	Alexandre Mouton	Democratic	1837 (special); 1837	Incumbent resigned March 1, 1842. New senator elected March 10, 1842. Whig gain. Winner later lost re-election to the next term; see below.	▌ ✓ Charles M. Conrad (Whig) 35; ▌Alexander Porter (Whig) 9; ▌George A. Waggaman (Whig) 4; ▌[FNU] Philips (Unknown) 3; ▌[FNU] Campbell (Unknown) 1; ▌John Randolph Grymes (Democratic) 1; ▌John Slidell (Democratic) 1; Blank 9
New Hampshire (Class 3)	Leonard Wilcox	Democratic	1842 (appointed)	Interim appointee elected June 8, 1842. Winner later lost re-election to the next term; see below.	▌ ✓ Leonard Wilcox (Democratic); [data missing]
Vermont (Class 3)	Samuel C. Crafts	Whig	1842 (appointed)	Interim appointee elected October 26, 1842. Winner had not been elected to the next term; see below.	▌ ✓ Samuel C. Crafts (Whig); [data missing]
New Jersey (Class 1)	William L. Dayton	Whig	1842 (appointed)	Interim appointee elected October 28, 1842.	▌ ✓ William L. Dayton (Whig) 42; ▌Garret D. Wall (Democratic) 33
South Carolina (Class 3)	William C. Preston	Whig	1833 (special); 1837	Incumbent resigned November 29, 1842. New senator elected December 2, 1842. Democratic gain. Winner also elected the same day to the next term; see below.	▌ ✓ George McDuffie (Democratic) 131; [data missing]
South Carolina (Class 2)	John C. Calhoun	Democratic	1832 (special); 1834; 1840	Incumbent resigned March 3, 1843. New senator elected December 15, 1842 on the third ballot. Democratic hold.	▌ ✓ Daniel Elliott Huger (Democratic) 82; ▌Robert B. Rhett (Democratic) 71; ▌Frederick W. Davie (Unknown) 3; ▌William McWillie (Democratic) 2; Blank 3
Maine (Class 1)	Reuel Williams	Democratic	1837 (special); 1839	Incumbent resigned February 15, 1843. New senator elected March 3, 1843. Democratic hold.	▌ ✓ John Fairfield (Democratic) 90; ▌William P. Fessenden (Whig) 40; ▌Seth May (Unknown) 1; ▌Freeman H. Morse (Whig) 1; ▌Gorham Parks (Democratic) 1; ▌John Portland (Unknown) 1

=== Races leading to the 28th Congress ===
In these regular elections, the winners were elected for the term beginning March 4, 1843; ordered by state.

All of the elections involved the Class 3 seats.

State	Incumbent			Results	Candidates
State	Senator	Party	Electoral history	Results	Candidates
Alabama	Arthur P. Bagby	Democratic	1841 (special)	Incumbent re-elected in 1842.	▌ ✓ Arthur P. Bagby (Democratic); [data missing]
Arkansas	Ambrose Sevier	Democratic	1836 (new state); 1837	Incumbent re-elected in 1843.	▌ ✓ Ambrose Sevier (Democratic); [data missing]
Connecticut	Perry Smith	Democratic	1837	Unknown if incumbent retired or lost re-election. New senator elected in 1842 but, due to ill health and a credentials challenge, was unable to serve until May 16, 1844; nevertheless, his term began March 4, 1843. Democratic hold.	▌ ✓ John M. Niles (Democratic); [data missing]
Georgia	Alfred Cuthbert	Democratic	1835 (special); 1837	Incumbent retired. New senator elected in 1843. Democratic hold.	▌ ✓ Walter T. Colquitt (Democratic); [data missing]
Illinois	Richard M. Young	Democratic	1837	Incumbent retired. New senator elected in 1843. Democratic hold.	▌ ✓ Sidney Breese (Democratic); [data missing]
Indiana	Oliver H. Smith	Whig	1836	Incumbent lost re-election. New senator elected in 1842. Democratic gain.	▌ ✓ Edward A. Hannegan (Democratic); [data missing]
Kentucky	John J. Crittenden	Whig	1816; 1819 (resigned); 1835; 1841 (retired); 1842 (special)	Incumbent re-elected January 7, 1843.	▌ ✓ John J. Crittenden (Whig) 88; ▌Richard Mentor Johnson (Democratic) 43
Louisiana	Charles M. Conrad	Whig	1842 (special)	Incumbent lost re-election. New senator elected January 9, 1843, but, due to ill health, did not take the seat. Whig hold.	▌ ✓ Alexander Porter (Whig) 45; ▌Charles M. Conrad (Whig) 22; ▌John Slidell (Democratic) 5; Blank 2
Maryland	John L. Kerr	Whig	1841 (special)	Incumbent retired or lost re-election. New senator elected in 1843. Whig hold.	▌ ✓ James Pearce (Whig); [data missing]
Missouri	Lewis F. Linn	Democratic	1833 (appointed); 1834 (special); 1836	Incumbent re-elected November 23, 1842.	▌ ✓ Lewis F. Linn (Democratic) 119; ▌Edward Bates (Whig) 3; ▌Abiel Leonard (Whig) 3; ▌Uriel Wright (Whig) 3; ▌Sinclair Kirtley (Unknown) 1
New Hampshire	Leonard Wilcox	Democratic	1842 (appointed); 1842 (special)	Incumbent lost re-election. New senator elected November 9, 1842. Democratic hold.	▌ ✓ Charles G. Atherton (Democratic) 152 (Note: The vote totals are for the New Hampshire House of Representatives only; the New Hampshire Senate journal does not provide a vote breakdown.); ▌Daniel M. Christie (Unknown) 49; ▌Andrew Pierce (Unknown) 11; ▌John Page (Democratic) 8; ▌Ira A. Eastman (Democratic) 2; ▌John P. Hale (Democratic) 1; ▌Daniel Hoit (Unknown) 1; ▌Leonard Wilcox (Democratic) 1; Blank 4
New York	Silas Wright Jr.	Democratic	1833 (special); 1837	Incumbent re-elected February 7, 1843.	▌ ✓ Silas Wright Jr. (Democratic) 94; ▌Millard Fillmore (Whig) 22; ▌John A. Collier (Whig) 7; ▌Willis Hall (Whig) 4; ▌George W. Patterson (Whig) 3; ▌George A. Simmons (Whig) 2; ▌Luther Bradish (Whig) 1; ▌Gulian C. Verplanck (Whig) 1
North Carolina	William A. Graham	Whig	1840 (special)	Incumbent retired or lost re-election. New senator elected in 1843. Democratic gain.	▌ ✓ William H. Haywood Jr. (Democratic); [data missing]
Ohio	William Allen	Democratic	1836	Incumbent re-elected in 1842.	▌ ✓ William Allen (Democratic); [data missing]
Pennsylvania	James Buchanan	Democratic	1834 (special); 1836	Incumbent re-elected January 10, 1843.	▌ ✓ James Buchanan (Democratic) 74; ▌John Banks (Whig) 54; ▌Richard Brodhead (Democratic) 1; ▌John Gibons (Unknown) 1; Not voting 2
South Carolina	Vacant			Sen. William C. Preston (W) resigned November 29, 1842. New senator elected December 2, 1842. Democratic gain. Winner also elected the same day to finish the current term; see above.	▌ ✓ George McDuffie (Democratic) 141; [data missing]
Vermont	Samuel C. Crafts	Whig	1842 (appointed)	Incumbent retired. New senator elected October 21, 1842. Whig hold. Winner was not elected to finish the current term; see above.	▌ ✓ William Upham (Whig); [data missing]

=== Elections during the 28th Congress ===
In these special elections, the winners were elected in 1843 after March 4; ordered by election date.

State	Incumbent			Results	Candidates
State	Senator	Party	Electoral history	Results	Candidates
Tennessee (Class 1)	Alfred O. P. Nicholson	Democratic	1840 (appointed)	Incumbent resigned February 7, 1842. New senator elected October 17, 1843. Whig gain.	▌ ✓ Ephraim H. Foster (Whig) 54; ▌William Carroll (Democratic) 33; ▌Cave Johnson (Democratic) 7; ▌Alexander O. Anderson (Democratic) 5; ▌[FNU] Fitzgerald (Unknown) 1; ▌[FNU] Waterson (Unknown) 1
Tennessee (Class 2)	Vacant since 1841			Legislature had failed to elect since the 27th Congress. New senator elected October 17, 1843. Whig gain.	▌ ✓ Spencer Jarnagin (Whig) 54; ▌Alexander O. Anderson (Democratic) 11; ▌John Blair (Democratic) 9; ▌Levin H. Coe (Democratic) 6; ▌George W. Rowles (Unknown) 6; ▌Cave Johnson (Democratic) 2; ▌William Trousdale (Democratic) 2; ▌William B. Reese (Unknown) 1; ▌M.A. Long (Unknown) 1; ▌Hopkins L. Turney (Democratic) 1; ▌Thomas L. Williams (Unknown) 1

== Complete list of races ==
=== Maryland ===
1843 United States Senate election in Maryland
- December 1843

80 members of the Maryland General Assembly
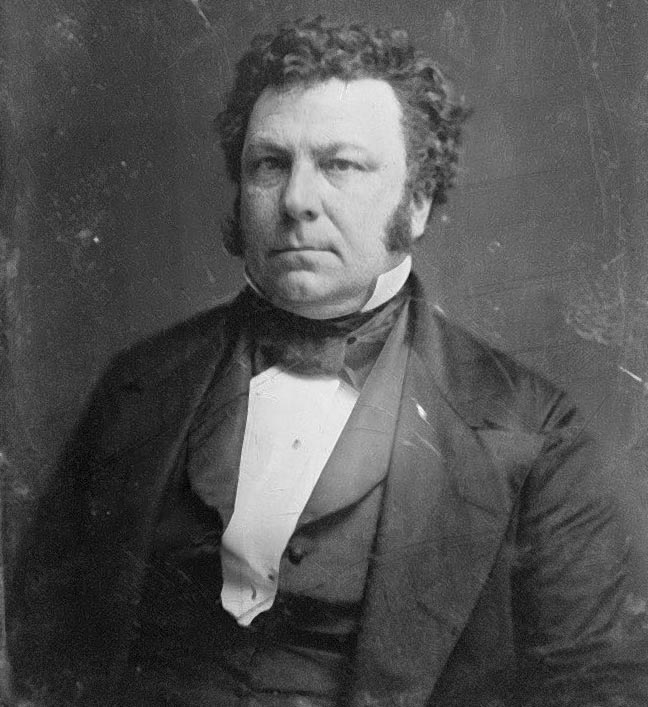
Candidate	James Pearce
Party	Whig
Legislative vote	-
Percentage	-%	%

James Pearce won election by an unknown margin of votes, for the Class 3 seat.

=== New York ===
The election was held February 7, 1843, by the New York State Legislature. Silas Wright Jr. had been elected in 1833 to this seat after the resignation of William L. Marcy, and had been re-elected in 1837. Wright's term would expire on March 3, 1843. At the State election in November 1842, Democrat William C. Bouck was elected Governor, 92 Democrats and 36 Whigs were elected to the Assembly, and 8 Democrats and 1 Whig were elected to the State Senate. The 66th New York State Legislature met from January 3 to April 18, 1843, at Albany, New York. The incumbent U.S. Senator Silas Wright Jr. was re-nominated unanimously by a Democratic caucus on the eve of the election. Congressman Millard Fillmore was the candidate of the Whig Party. Silas Wright Jr. was the choice of both the Assembly and the Senate, and was declared elected.

Candidate	Party	Senate (32 members)	Assembly (128 members)
Silas Wright Jr.	Democrat	17	77
Millard Fillmore	Whig	6	16
John A. Collier	Whig	1	6
Willis Hall	Whig		4
George W. Patterson	Whig		3
George A. Simmons	Whig		2
Luther Bradish	Whig	1	
Gulian C. Verplanck	Whig		1

Wright continued in the U.S. Senate, and remained in office until November 1844 when he resigned after his election as Governor of New York. Henry A. Foster was appointed to fill the vacancy temporarily, but the State Legislature elected John A. Dix for the remainder of Wright's term.

=== Pennsylvania ===
The election was held January 10, 1843. Future President of the United States James Buchanan was re-elected by the Pennsylvania General Assembly to the United States Senate. The Pennsylvania General Assembly, consisting of the House of Representatives and the Senate, convened on January 10, 1843, to elect a new Senator to fill the term beginning on March 4, 1843. Incumbent Democrat James Buchanan, who was elected in 1834 and re-elected in 1836, was a successful candidate for re-election to another term. The results of the vote of both houses combined are as follows:

State Legislature Results
Party	Candidate	Votes	%
Democratic	James Buchanan (Incumbent)	74	56.06
Whig	John Banks	54	40.91
Democratic	Richard Brodhead	1	0.76
Unknown	John Gibons	1	0.76
N/A	Not voting	2	1.52
Totals		132	100.00%

=== Tennessee ===
In 1841, Spencer Jarnagin was nominated for U.S. Senator by the Whig caucus in the Tennessee General Assembly. However, some of the Democrats in the legislature decided that no Senator would be preferable to a Whig. Known as the "Immortal Thirteen" by Tennessee Democrats, they refused to allow a quorum on the issue. By the time Jarnagin was eventually elected to the seat and sworn in, over two and half years, almost half of the term, had elapsed. Jarnagin finally assumed office on October 17, 1843.

== See also ==
- 1842 United States elections
  - 1842–43 United States House of Representatives elections
- 27th United States Congress
- 28th United States Congress
