= 1845 United States Senate special election in Pennsylvania =

The 1845 United States Senate special election in Pennsylvania was held on March 13, 1845. Simon Cameron was elected by the Pennsylvania General Assembly to the United States Senate.

== Background ==
Democrat and future president James Buchanan was elected to the United States Senate by the Pennsylvania General Assembly, consisting of the House of Representatives and the Senate, in an 1834 special election. He was re-elected in 1836 and 1843. Buchanan resigned on March 5, 1845, after being appointed U.S. secretary of state by President James K. Polk.

== Results ==
Following Buchanan's resignation, the Pennsylvania General Assembly convened on March 13, 1845, to elect a new senator to fill the vacancy and serve the remainder of the term set to expire on March 4, 1849. Five ballots were recorded. The results of the fifth and final ballot of both houses combined are as follows:

State legislature results
| Party | Candidate | Votes | % |
|---|---|---|---|
| Democratic | Simon Cameron | 67 | 50.38 |
| Democratic | George W. Woodward | 55 | 41.35 |
| Whig | J. R. Ingersoll | 2 | 1.50 |
| Whig | John Banks | 1 | 0.75 |
| Know Nothing | Peter A. Brown | 1 | 0.75 |
| Unknown | Thomas S. Bell | 1 | 0.75 |
| Whig | T. D. Cochran | 1 | 0.75 |
| N/A | Not voting | 5 | 3.76 |
| Totals | | 133 | 100.00% |

== See also ==
- 1844–45 United States Senate elections
- 1845 United States Senate election in Pennsylvania

| Preceded by 1843 | Pennsylvania U.S. Senate election (Class III); 1845 | Succeeded by 1849 |
