= 1849 United States Senate election in Pennsylvania =

- January 10, 1849
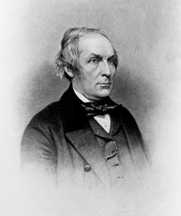

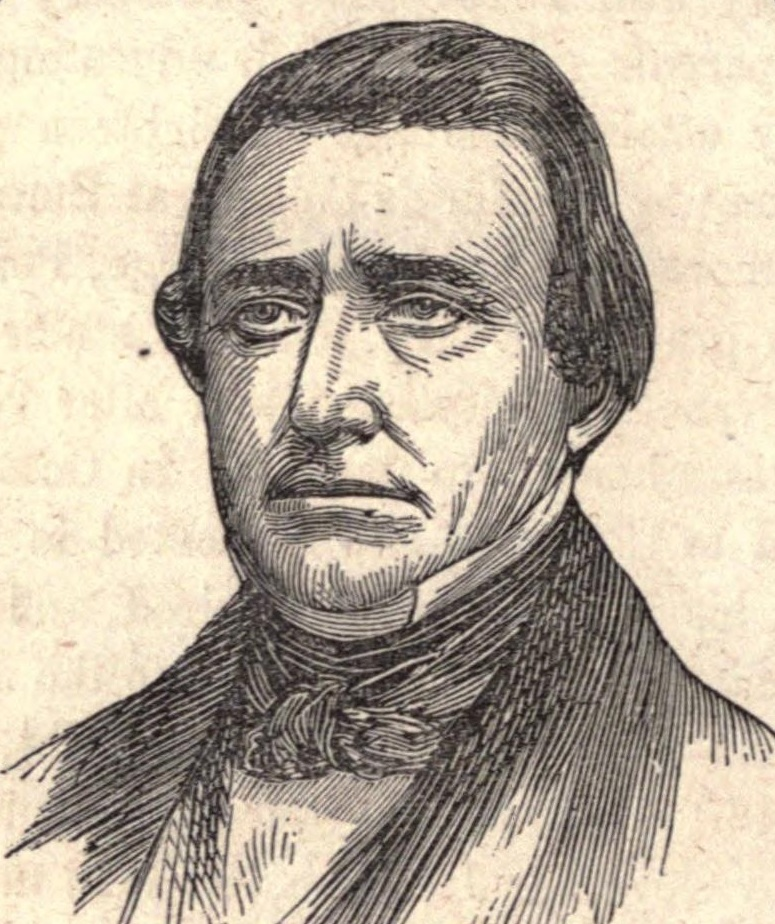
Nominee	James Cooper	Richard Brodhead
Party	Whig	Democratic
Leg. vote	66	35
Percentage	49.62%	26.32%
U.S. senator before election
James Cooper
Whig
Elected U.S. Senator
Simon Cameron
Democratic

The 1849 United States Senate election in Pennsylvania was held on January 10, 1849. James Cooper was elected by the Pennsylvania General Assembly to the United States Senate.

== Results ==
Incumbent Democrat Simon Cameron, who was elected in 1845, was not a candidate for re-election to another term. The Pennsylvania General Assembly, consisting of the House of Representatives and the Senate, convened on January 10, 1849, to elect a new senator to fill the term beginning on March 4, 1849. Three ballots were recorded. The results of the third and final ballot of both houses combined are as follows:

State legislature results
Party	Candidate	Votes	%
Whig	James Cooper	66	49.62
Democratic	Richard Brodhead	62	46.62
Free Soil	Thaddeus Stevens	3	2.26
N/A	Not voting	2	1.50
Totals		133	100.00%

== See also ==
- 1848–49 United States Senate elections

Preceded by 1845	Pennsylvania U.S. Senate election (Class III); 1849	Succeeded by 1856
