= 1845 United States Senate elections in New York =

The 1845 United States Senate special election in New York was held on January 18, 1845, by the New York State Legislature to elect two U.S. senators (Class 1 and Class 3) to represent the State of New York in the United States Senate. The regular 1845 United States Senate election in New York was held on February 4, 1845, to elect a U.S. senator (Class 1) to represent the State of New York in the United States Senate.

== Background ==
Nathaniel P. Tallmadge had been re-elected in 1840 to the Class 1 seat (term 1839–1845), but resigned on June 17, 1844, to be appointed governor of Wisconsin Territory by President John Tyler. On November 30, Governor William C. Bouck appointed Lieutenant Governor Daniel S. Dickinson to fill the vacancy temporarily, and Dickinson took his seat on December 9, 1844.

Silas Wright, Jr. had been re-elected in 1843 to the Class 3 seat (term 1843–1849), but resigned on November 26, 1844, after his election as g of New York. On November 30, Governor William C. Bouck appointed State Senator Henry A. Foster to fill the vacancy temporarily, and Foster took his seat on December 9, 1844.

At the state election in November 1844, Democrat Silas Wright was elected governor; 70 Democrats, 44 Whigs, and 14 Anti-Renters and Native Americans were elected to the assembly; and 6 Democrats, 1 Whig and 1 American Republican were elected to the state senate. The 68th New York State Legislature met from January 7 to May 14, 1845, at Albany, New York. At this time the Democratic Party was split in two factions: the "Hunkers" and the "Barnburners". At the Democratic caucus for speaker, Hunker Horatio Seymour received 35 votes against 30 for Barnburner William C. Crain. Both temporarily appointed U.S. senators, Dickinson and Foster, were Hunkers, but the Barnburners claimed one of the seats.

== Candidates ==
A Democratic caucus to nominate candidates for the U.S. Senate met in January 1845, with 93 state legislators present.

To fill the vacancy caused by the resignation of Silas Wright, John Adams Dix (Barnburner) was nominated, winning by a vote of 51 against 41 for Chief Justice Samuel Nelson (Hunker). To fill the vacancy caused by the resignation of Nathaniel P. Tallmadge, for the remainder of the term that would expire on March 3, the incumbent Daniel S. Dickinson (Hunker) was re-nominated. After these nominations were made, the legislature moved to adjourn, and to postpone the nomination of a candidate for the full term beginning on March 4; this motion was rejected by a vote of 55 to 37. Daniel S. Dickinson was nominated to succeed himself for a full term (1845–1851). The vote was 54 for Dickinson, 13 for Ex-Congressman Michael Hoffman (Barnb.), 3 for Ex-Congressman Freeborn G. Jewett (Barnb.), 1 for Samuel Nelson (Hunker), and 4 blanks. As many Barnburners refused to vote on this nomination, they opposed a motion to "make the nomination unanimous."

== Result ==
1845 United States Senator special election result, Class 1
Office	House	Democrat		Whig		American Republican	
U.S. senator	State Senate (32 members)	Daniel S. Dickinson	27	Millard Fillmore	3	Jonathan Thompson	1
	State Assembly (128 members)	Daniel S. Dickinson					

1845 United States Senator special election result, Class 3
Office	House	Democrat		Whig		American Republican	
U.S. senator	State Senate (32 members)	John Adams Dix	27	Willis Hall	3	Harman B. Cropsey	1
	State Assembly (128 members)	John Adams Dix					

1845 United States Senator election result
Office	House	Democrat		Whig	
U.S. senator	State Senate (32 members)	Daniel S. Dickinson	25	John C. Clark	4
	State Assembly (128 members)	Daniel S. Dickinson			

== Aftermath ==
Dickinson re-took his seat under the new credentials on January 27, 1845, was re-elected, and remained in office until March 3, 1851, when his term expired.

Dix took his seat on January 27, 1845, and remained in office until March 3, 1849, when his term expired.

The defeated Hunkers' candidate for the Class 3 seat, Justice Samuel Nelson was appointed to the U.S. Supreme Court on February 27, 1845, one week before the end of President John Tyler's term.

== See also ==
- United States Senate elections, 1844 and 1845

== Sources ==
- The New York Civil List compiled in 1858 (see: pg. 63 for U.S. Senators; pg. 134f for State Senators 1845; pg. 230f for Members of Assembly 1845)
- Members of the 28th United States Congress
- Members of the 29th United States Congress
- Political History of the State of New York, from Jan. 1, 1841, to Jan. 1, 1847; Vol. III by Jabez Delano Hammond (State election, 1844: pg. 505f; appointments, 1844: pg. 508f; Speaker election, 1845: pg. 518; U.S. Senate nominations, 1845: pg. 526ff) [gives wrong date for caucus, and election]
- Abridgment of the Debates in Congress, from 1789 to 1856: Dec. 4, 1843 to June 18, 1846 (page 197)
- Journal of the Senate (68th Session) (1845; pg. 77f and 142f)
