= 1841 United States Senate election in Tennessee =

In 1841, Spencer Jarnagin was nominated for U.S. Senator by the Whig caucus in the Tennessee General Assembly. However, some of the Democrats in the legislature decided that no senator would be preferable to a Whig. Known as the "Immortal Thirteen" by Tennessee Democrats, they refused to allow a quorum on the issue.

== See also ==
- 1843 United States Senate special elections in Tennessee
- 1840 and 1841 United States Senate elections
