= 1843 United States Senate election in Pennsylvania =

The 1843 United States Senate election in Pennsylvania was held on January 10, 1843. Future president of the United States James Buchanan was re-elected by the Pennsylvania General Assembly to the United States Senate.

== Results ==
The Pennsylvania General Assembly, consisting of the House of Representatives and the Senate, convened on January 10, 1843, to elect a new senator to fill the term beginning on March 4, 1843. Incumbent Democrat James Buchanan, who was elected in 1834 and re-elected in 1836, was a successful candidate for re-election to another term. The results of the vote of both houses combined are as follows:

State legislature results
Party	Candidate	Votes	%
Democratic	James Buchanan (Inc.)	74	56.06
Whig	John Banks	54	40.91
Democratic	Richard Brodhead	1	0.76
Unknown	John Gibons	1	0.76
N/A	Not voting	2	1.52
Totals		132	100.00%

== See also ==
- 1842–43 United States Senate elections

Preceded by 1836	Pennsylvania U.S. Senate election (Class III); 1843	Succeeded by 1845
