= 1839 United States Senate election in Massachusetts =

- January 17 and 18, 1839

43 Members of the Massachusetts Senate 501 Members of the Massachusetts House Majority vote of each house needed to win
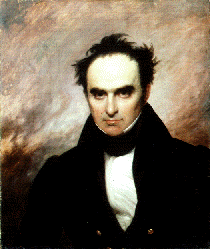

Nominee	Daniel Webster	Benjamin F. Hallett
Party	Whig	Democratic
Senate	34	9
Percentage	79.07%	20.93%
House	336	165
Percentage	67.06%	32.93%
Senator before election
Daniel Webster
Whig
Elected Senator
Daniel Webster
Whig

The 1839 United States Senate election in Massachusetts was held on January 17 and 18, 1839.

Incumbent Whig Senator Daniel Webster was easily re-elected to his third term in office.

At this time, Massachusetts elected U.S. senators by a majority of each house of the Massachusetts General Court.

== Election ==
=== Senate vote ===
The Senate voted on January 17.

1839 Senate election in the Senate
Party	Candidate	Votes	%
Whig	Daniel Webster (incumbent)	34	79.07%
Democratic	Benjamin F. Hallett	9	20.93%
Total votes		43	100.00%

=== House election ===
The House voted on January 18.

1839 Senate election in the House
Party	Candidate	Votes	%
Whig	Daniel Webster (incumbent)	336	67.06%
Democratic	Benjamin F. Hallett	165	32.93%
Total votes		501	100.00%

== Aftermath ==
Webster resigned his seat in 1841 to accept his appointment as Secretary of State by President William Henry Harrison. However, Webster left office in 1843 after President John Tyler pressured him to resign and was elected to this seat again in 1845.
