= 1840–41 United States Senate elections =

- Various dates
- Class 2

18 of the 52 seats in the United States Senate (with special elections) 27 seats needed for a majority
	Majority party	Minority party
Party	Whig	Democratic
Last election	20 seats	28 seats
Seats before	21	29
Seats won	11	6
Seats after	29	22
Seat change	▲8	▼7
Seats up	5	13
- Results: Democratic hold Whig gain Whig hold Legislature failed to elect
Majority Party before election
Democratic
Elected Majority Party
Whig

The 1840–41 United States Senate elections were held on various dates in various states. As these U.S. Senate elections were prior to the ratification of the Seventeenth Amendment in 1913, senators were chosen by state legislatures. Senators were elected over a wide range of time throughout 1840 and 1841, and a seat may have been filled months late or remained vacant due to legislative deadlock. In these elections, terms were up for the senators in Class 2.

Corresponding with their party's success in the 1840 presidential election, the Whig Party took control of the Senate.

== Results summary ==
Senate party division, 27th Congress (1841–1843)

- Majority party: Whig (29)
- Minority party: Democratic (22–20)
- Other parties: (0)
- Vacant: (1–3)
- Total seats: 52

== Change in composition ==
=== Before the elections ===
After the November 25, 1840 special elections in North Carolina.

				D_{1}	D_{2}	D_{3}	D_{4}	D_{5}	D_{6}
D_{16}	D_{15}	D_{14}	D_{13}	D_{12}	D_{11}	D_{10}	D_{9}	D_{8}	D_{7}
D_{17} Ran	D_{18} Ran	D_{19} Ran	D_{20} Ran	D_{21} Ran	D_{22} Unknown	D_{23} Unknown	D_{24} Retired	D_{25} Retired	D_{26} Retired
Majority →									D_{27} Retired
W_{17} Ran	W_{18} Mass. (sp 1); Resigned	W_{19} Mass. (sp 2); Mass. (reg); Resigned	W_{20} Retired	W_{21} N.C. (reg); Ran	V_{2}	V_{1}	D_{29} Ran	D_{28} Ran	D_{27} Retired
W_{16} Retired	W_{15}	W_{14}	W_{13}	W_{12}	W_{11}	W_{10}	W_{9}	W_{8}	W_{7}
				W_{1}	W_{2}	W_{3}	W_{4}	W_{5}	W_{6}

=== After the elections ===
				D_{1}	D_{2}	D_{3}	D_{4}	D_{5}	D_{6}
D_{16}	D_{15}	D_{14}	D_{13}	D_{12}	D_{11}	D_{10}	D_{9}	D_{8}	D_{7}
D_{17} Re-elected	D_{18} Re-elected	D_{19} Re-elected	D_{20} Hold	D_{21} Hold	D_{22} Re-elected	V_{3} D Loss	V_{2}	V_{1}	W_{27} Gain
Majority →									W_{27} Gain
W_{17} Re-elected	W_{18} Mass. (sp 1); Hold	W_{19} Mass. (reg); Mass. (sp 2); Hold	W_{20} Hold	W_{21} N.C. (reg); Re-elected	W_{22} Gain	W_{23} Gain	W_{24} Gain	W_{25} Gain	W_{26} Gain
W_{16} Hold	W_{15}	W_{14}	W_{13}	W_{12}	W_{11}	W_{10}	W_{9}	W_{8}	W_{7}
				W_{1}	W_{2}	W_{3}	W_{4}	W_{5}	W_{6}

=== Beginning of the next Congress ===
				D_{1}	D_{2}	D_{3}	D_{4}	D_{5}	D_{6}
D_{16}	D_{15}	D_{14}	D_{13}	D_{12}	D_{11}	D_{10}	D_{9}	D_{8}	D_{7}
D_{17}	D_{18}	D_{19}	D_{20}	D_{21}	D_{22}	V_{2}	W_{29} Gain	W_{28} Gain	W_{27}
Majority →									W_{27}
W_{17}	W_{18}	W_{19}	W_{20}	W_{21}	W_{22}	W_{23}	W_{24}	W_{25}	W_{26}
W_{16}	W_{15}	W_{14}	W_{13}	W_{12}	W_{11}	W_{10}	W_{9}	W_{8}	W_{7}
				W_{1}	W_{2}	W_{3}	W_{4}	W_{5}	W_{6}

Key:

D_{#}	Democratic
W_{#}	Whig
V_{#}	Vacant

== Race summaries ==
=== Special elections during the 26th Congress ===
In these elections, the winners were elected during 1840 or in 1841 before March 4; ordered by election date.

State	Incumbent			Results	Candidates
State	Senator	Party	Electoral history	Results	Candidates
Pennsylvania (Class 1)	Vacant since 1839.			Incumbent Samuel McKean's (D) term expired and the legislature failed to elect a successor. New senator elected January 14, 1840. Democratic hold.	▌ ✓ Daniel Sturgeon (Democratic) 87; ▌Charles Ogle (Whig) 26; ▌Richard Biddle (Anti-Masonic) 17; Not voting 3
Michigan (Class 1)	Vacant since 1839.			Incumbent Lucius Lyon (D) retired, his term expired, and the legislature failed to elect a successor. New senator elected January 20, 1840. Whig gain.	▌ ✓ Augustus S. Porter (Whig) 40; ▌Epaphroditus Ransom (Democratic) 14; ▌Ross Wilkins (Unknown) 4; ▌John Biddle (Whig) 3; ▌Abraham Edwards (Democratic) 3; ▌Zina Pitcher (Whig) 1
New York (Class 1)	Vacant since 1839.			Incumbent Nathaniel P. Tallmadge's (D) term expired and the legislature failed to elect a successor. Incumbent re-elected January 27, 1840 to his former position as a Whig. Whig gain.	▌ ✓ Nathaniel P. Tallmadge (Whig); [data missing]
Tennessee (Class 2)	Hugh Lawson White	Whig	1825 (special); 1829; 1835	Incumbent resigned January 13, 1840, after refusing to vote for the Subtreasury Bill as demanded by the Tennessee legislature. New senator elected January 27, 1840. Democratic gain. Winner was not elected to the next term; see below.	▌ ✓ Alexander O. Anderson (Democratic) 49; ▌Hugh Lawson White (Whig) 42; ▌William Trousdale (Democratic) 3; ▌[FNU] Fulton (Unknown) 3
Connecticut (Class 1)	Thaddeus Betts	Whig	1838 or 1839	Incumbent died April 7, 1840. New senator elected May 20, 1840. Whig hold.	▌ ✓ Jabez W. Huntington (Whig); [data missing]
North Carolina (Class 2)	Bedford Brown	Democratic	1829 (special); 1835	Incumbent resigned November 16, 1840, because he could not obey instructions of the North Carolina General Assembly. New senator elected November 25, 1840. Whig gain. Winner also elected the same day to the next term; see below.	▌ ✓ Willie P. Mangum (Whig) 98; ▌Bedford Brown (Democratic) 57; ▌William H. Haywood Jr. (Democratic) 2; ▌Romulus M. Saunders (Democratic) 2; ▌Weldon N. Edwards (Unknown) 1; ▌James Kerr (Unknown) 1
North Carolina (Class 3)	Robert Strange	Democratic	1836 (special); 1836	Incumbent resigned November 16, 1840, because he could not obey instructions of the North Carolina General Assembly. New senator elected November 25, 1840. Whig gain.	▌ ✓ William A. Graham (Whig) 98; ▌Robert Strange (Democratic) 64
Maryland (Class 3)	John S. Spence	Whig	1836 (special); 1837	Incumbent died October 24, 1840. New senator elected January 5, 1841. Whig hold.	▌ ✓ John L. Kerr (Whig); [data missing]
Delaware (Class 1)	Richard H. Bayard	Whig	1836 (special); 1838 or 1839	Incumbent resigned September 19, 1839, to become Chief Justice of the Delaware Supreme Court. New senator elected January 12, 1841 to his former position. Whig hold.	▌ ✓ Richard H. Bayard (Whig) 15; ▌William D. Waples (Whig) 9; ▌James Booth Jr. (Unknown) 4
Massachusetts (Class 2)	John Davis	Whig	1835	Incumbent resigned January 5, 1841, after being elected Governor of Massachusetts. New senator elected January 13, 1841. Whig hold. Winner also elected the same day to the next term; see below.	▌ ✓ Isaac C. Bates (Whig); [data missing]
Virginia (Class 1)	Vacant since 1839.			Incumbent William C. Rives's (D) term expired and the legislature failed to elect a successor. Incumbent re-elected January 18, 1841 to his former position as a Whig. Whig gain.	▌ ✓ William C. Rives (Whig) 85; ▌John Y. Mason (Democratic) 46; ▌James McDowell (Democratic) 30; Scattering 3
Massachusetts (Class 1)	Daniel Webster	Whig	1827; 1833; 1839	Incumbent resigned February 22, 1841, to become U.S. Secretary of State. New senator elected February 23, 1841. Whig hold.	▌ ✓ Rufus Choate (Whig); [data missing]

=== Races leading to the 27th Congress ===
In these regular elections, the winner was elected for the term beginning March 4, 1841; ordered by state.

All of the elections involved the Class 2 seats.

State	Incumbent			Results	Candidates
State	Senator	Party	Electoral history	Results	Candidates
Alabama	William R. King	Democratic	1819 (new state); 1822; 1828; 1834	Incumbent re-elected November 17, 1840.	▌ ✓ William R. King (Democratic) 72; ▌John Gayle (Whig) 55
Arkansas	William S. Fulton	Democratic	1836 (new state)	Incumbent re-elected in 1840.	▌ ✓ William S. Fulton (Democratic); [data missing]
Delaware	Thomas Clayton	Whig	1824 (special); 1827 (retired or lost); 1837 (special)	Incumbent re-elected January 12, 1841.	▌ ✓ Thomas Clayton (Whig) 27; Blank 1
Georgia	Wilson Lumpkin	Democratic	1837 (special)	Unknown if incumbent retired or lost re-election. New senator elected December 4, 1840. Whig gain.	▌ ✓ John M. Berrien (Whig); [data missing]
Illinois	John M. Robinson	Democratic	1830 (special); 1834	Incumbent retired. New senator elected December 16, 1840. Democratic hold.	▌ ✓ Samuel McRoberts (Democratic) 77; ▌Cyrus Edwards (Whig) 50; ▌Edward D. Baker (Whig) 1
Kentucky	John J. Crittenden	Whig	1816; 1819 (resigned); 1835	Incumbent retired. New senator elected February 18, 1841 on the twenty-first ballot. Whig hold.	▌ ✓ James T. Morehead (Whig) 72; ▌Joseph R. Underwood (Whig) 61
Louisiana	Robert C. Nicholas	Democratic	1836 (special)	Unknown if incumbent retired or lost re-election. New senator elected in 1840. Whig gain.	▌ ✓ Alexander Barrow (Whig); [data missing]
Maine	John Ruggles	Democratic	1835 (special); 1835	Incumbent retired. New senator elected January 28, 1841. Whig gain.	▌ ✓ George Evans (Whig) 108; ▌John Fairfield (Democratic) 89; ▌Hannibal Hamlin (Democratic) 1; ▌John S. Tenney (Unknown) 1; ▌Richard H. Vose (Whig) 1
Massachusetts	Vacant			Sen. John Davis (W) resigned January 5, 1841, after being elected Governor of Massachusetts. New senator elected January 13, 1841. Whig hold. Winner also elected the same day to finish the current term, see above.	▌ ✓ Isaac C. Bates (Whig); [data missing]
Michigan	John Norvell	Democratic	1835 (new state)	Incumbent retired. New senator elected February 3, 1841. Whig gain.	▌ ✓ William Woodbridge (Whig) 36; ▌J. Wright Gordon (Whig) 26; ▌James L. Conger (Whig) 1; ▌William H. Welch (Unknown) 1
Mississippi	Robert J. Walker	Democratic	1835	Incumbent re-elected in 1841.	▌ ✓ Robert J. Walker (Democratic); [data missing]
New Hampshire	Henry Hubbard	Democratic	1835	Incumbent retired to run for New Hampshire Governor. New senator elected December 2, 1840. Democratic hold.	▌ ✓ Levi Woodbury (Democratic); [data missing]
New Jersey	Garret D. Wall	Democratic	1835	Incumbent lost re-election. New senator elected February 19, 1841. Whig gain.	▌ ✓ Jacob W. Miller (Whig) 46; ▌Garret D. Wall (Democratic) 16
North Carolina	Vacant			Sen. Bedford Brown (D) resigned November 16, 1840, because he could not obey instructions of the North Carolina General Assembly. New senator elected November 24, 1840. Whig gain. Winner also elected the same day to finish the current term; see above.	▌ ✓ Willie P. Mangum (Whig) 99; ▌Bedford Brown (Democratic) 65
Rhode Island	Nehemiah R. Knight	Whig	1821 (special); 1823; 1828; 1835	Incumbent retired. New senator elected October 29, 1840. Whig hold.	▌ ✓ James F. Simmons (Whig) 55; ▌Samuel Y. Atwell (Democratic) 24; ▌Tristram Burges (Whig) 2
South Carolina	John C. Calhoun	Democratic	1832 (special); 1834	Incumbent re-elected November 30, 1840.	▌ ✓ John C. Calhoun (Democratic); [data missing]
Tennessee	Alexander O. Anderson	Democratic	1840 (special)	Incumbent retired. Legislature failed to elect. Democratic loss. Seat would not be filled until 1843.	None.
Virginia	William H. Roane	Democratic	1837 (special)	Incumbent lost re-election. New senator elected March 3, 1841 on the second ballot. Whig gain.	▌ ✓ William S. Archer (Whig) 82; ▌William H. Roane (Democratic) 50; ▌John Robertson (Whig) 12; ▌Thomas W. Gilmer (Whig) 7; ▌James W. Pegram (Whig) 2; ▌James C. Bruce (Unknown) 1; Scattering 9

=== Special elections during the 27th Congress ===
In this special election, the winner was elected in 1841 after March 4; ordered by election date.

State	Incumbent			Results	Candidates
State	Senator	Party	Electoral history	Results	Candidates
Alabama (Class 3)	Clement Comer Clay	Democratic	1837 (special)	Incumbent resigned November 15, 1841. New senator elected November 24, 1841 on the second ballot. Democratic hold.	▌ ✓ Arthur P. Bagby (Democratic) 66; ▌David Moore (Unknown) 59; ▌David Hubbard (Democratic) 3; ▌Jack Shackelford (Unknown) 1

== Maryland (special) ==
1841 United States Senate special election in Maryland
- December 1841

80 members of the Maryland General Assembly
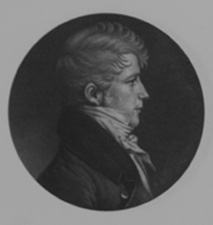
Candidate	John Leeds Kerr
Party	Whig
Legislative vote	-
Percentage	-%	%

John Leeds Kerr won election to a full term an unknown margin of votes, for the Class 3 seat.

== Massachusetts ==
There were three elections due to the February 22, 1841, resignation of Whig Daniel Webster to become U.S. Secretary of State and the January 5, 1841, resignation of Whig John Davis to become Governor of Massachusetts.

=== Massachusetts (special, class 2) ===
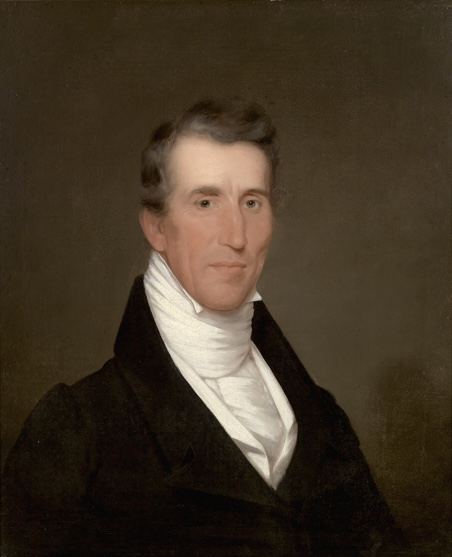
Senator Isaac C. Bates

Whig Isaac C. Bates was elected January 13, 1841, to finish Davis's term.

=== Massachusetts (regular) ===
Bates was also elected January 13, 1841, to the next term.

Bates would only serve, however, until his March 16, 1845, death, and Davis was again elected to the seat.

=== Massachusetts (special, class 1) ===
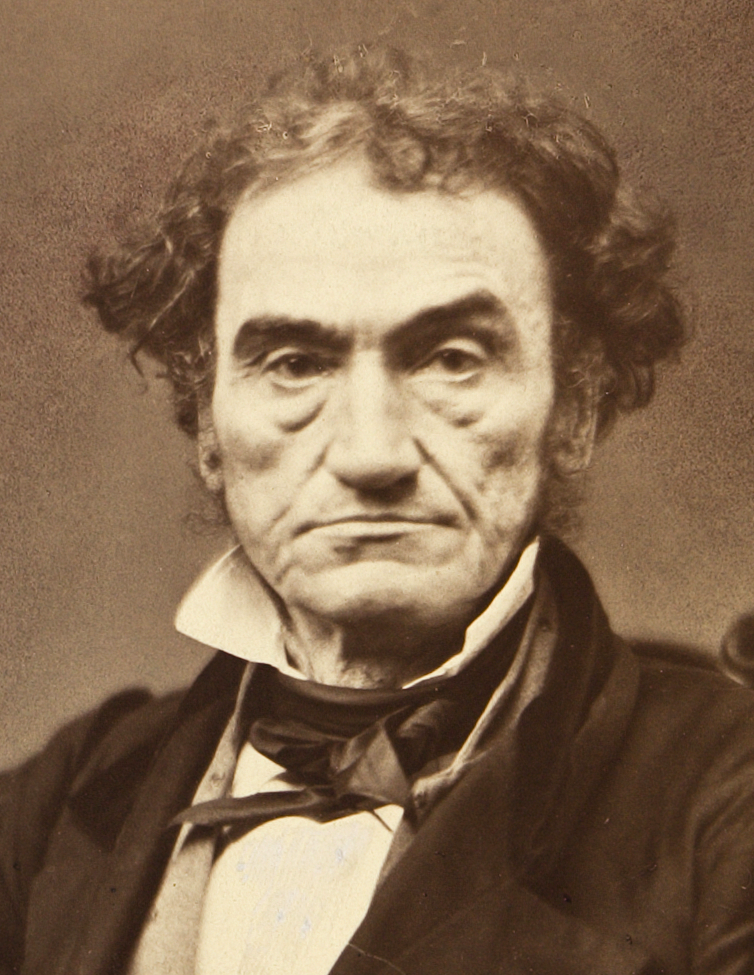
Senator Rufus Choate

Whig Rufus Choate was elected February 23, 1841, to finish Webster's term which would continue until 1845.

== New York (special) ==
Nathaniel P. Tallmadge had been elected as a Jacksonian Democrat in 1833 to this seat, and his term expired March 3, 1839. An election was held February 5, 1839. Although Tallmadge received the most votes, no candidate received a majority and the seat was declared vacant due to the legislature's failure to elect.

At the State election in November 1839, 7 Whigs and 3 Democrats were elected to the State Senate, which gave the Whigs a majority, the first anti-Bucktails/Jacksonian/Democratic majority in 20 years. The 63rd New York State Legislature met from January 7 to May 14, 1840, at Albany, New York. The strength of the parties in the Assembly, as shown by the vote for Speaker, was: 68 for Whig George Washington Patterson and 56 for Democrat Levi S. Chatfield.

On January 14, 1840, Nathaniel P. Tallmadge received a majority in both the Assembly and the Senate, and was declared elected.

Candidate	Party	Senate (32 members)	Assembly (128 members)
Nathaniel P. Tallmadge	Whig	19	
Samuel Beardsley	Democratic	2	
Levi Beardsley	Democratic	1	
William C. Bouck	Democratic	1	
Benjamin F. Butler	Democratic	1	
Churchill C. Cambreleng	Democratic	1	
Hiram Denio	Democratic	1	
John A. Dix	Democratic	1	
Azariah C. Flagg	Democratic	1	
John Savage	Democratic	1	
John Tracy	Democratic	1	

Tallmadge re-took his seat on January 27, 1840, and remained in office until June 17, 1844, when he resigned to be appointed Governor of Wisconsin Territory. Daniel S. Dickinson was appointed to fill the vacancy temporarily, and subsequently elected by the State Legislature to succeed Tallmadge.

== North Carolina ==
There were three elections due to the November 16, 1840, resignations of Democrats Bedford Brown and Robert Strange.

=== North Carolina (special, class 2) ===
Whig Willie Mangum was elected November 25, 1840, to finish Brown's term that would end in March 1841.

=== North Carolina (regular) ===
Mangum was later re-elected in 1841 to the next term.

=== North Carolina (special, class 3) ===
Whig William Alexander Graham was elected November 25, 1840, to finish Strange's term that would end in 1843.

== Pennsylvania ==
The election was held on January 14, 1840, after the regularly scheduled election in December 1838 was postponed due to the Buckshot War. Daniel Sturgeon was elected by the Pennsylvania General Assembly to the United States Senate.

Democrat Samuel McKean was elected by the Pennsylvania General Assembly, consisting of the House of Representatives and the Senate, in the 1832–1833 Senate election. Sen. McKean's term was to expire on March 4, 1839, and an election would have occurred during the winter of 1838–1839 elect a senator for the successive term. The election did not occur, however, due to significant political unrest in Harrisburg, the state capital, over disputed election returns during the Buckshot War. McKean's seat was vacated when his term expired in March 1839 and remained vacant until the General Assembly elected a new senator in 1840.

The Pennsylvania General Assembly convened on January 14, 1840, to elect a senator to serve out the remainder of the term that began on March 4, 1839. The results of the vote of both houses combined are as follows:

State Legislature Results
Party	Candidate	Votes	%
Democratic	Daniel Sturgeon	87	65.41%
Whig	Charles Ogle	26	19.55%
Anti-Masonic	Richard Biddle	17	12.78%
N/A	Not voting	3	2.26%
Total votes		133	100.00%

== See also ==
- 1840 United States elections
  - 1840 United States presidential election
  - 1840–41 United States House of Representatives elections
- 26th United States Congress
- 27th United States Congress
