= 1843 United States Senate special elections in Tennessee =

In 1841, Spencer Jarnagin was nominated for U.S. Senator by the Whig caucus in the Tennessee General Assembly. However, some of the Democrats in the legislature decided that no senator would be preferable to a Whig. Known as the "Immortal Thirteen" by Tennessee Democrats, they refused to allow a quorum on the issue. By the time Jarnagin was eventually elected to the seat and sworn in, over two and half years, almost half of the term, had elapsed. Jarnagin finally assumed office on October 17, 1843.

== See also ==
- 1842 and 1843 United States Senate elections
