= Willis Hall (New York politician) =

American politician and lawyer

Willis Hall (April 1, 1801 – July 14, 1868) was an American lawyer and politician from New York.

== Life ==
Hall was born on April 1, 1801, in Granville, Washington County, New York, the son of Rev. Nathaniel Hall (1764–1820) and Hannah Emerson Hall (1773–1832). He graduated from Yale College in 1824, studied law in New York City and Litchfield, Connecticut. He was admitted to the bar in 1827, and practiced in Mobile, Alabama from 1827 to 1831, and then in New York City. He married Helen Haudley.

He was a Whig member of the New York State Assembly from New York County in 1838, and from Albany County in 1843. He was New York State Attorney General from 1839 to 1842, elected by the New York State Legislature after the Whigs obtained the majority at the 1838 elections.

In 1847, he was elected Corporation Counsel of New York City. In 1848, he opposed the nomination of General Zachary Taylor as the Whig candidate for the presidency and supported Henry Clay, and retired from professional and political life after Clay's defeat. He resigned as Corporation Counsel in May 1849, and Henry E. Davies was appointed to fill the vacancy.

He died on July 14, 1868 in New York City.

== Sources ==
- Google Books A Centurial history of the Mendon Association of Congregational Ministers by Rev. Mortimer Blake (short bio on page 245, Boston, 1853)

Legal offices
Preceded by Samuel Beardsley	New York State Attorney General; 1839–1842	Succeeded by George P. Barker
