= 1836 United States Senate election in Pennsylvania =

The 1836 United States Senate election in Pennsylvania was held on December 14, 1836. Future president of the United States James Buchanan was re-elected by the Pennsylvania General Assembly to the United States Senate.

== Background ==
After William Wilkins resigned from office to become U.S. Minister to Russia, James Buchanan was elected by the General Assembly, consisting of the House of Representatives and the Senate, in 1834 to serve the remainder of the unexpired term, which was to expire on March 4, 1837.

== Results ==
The Pennsylvania General Assembly convened on December 14, 1836, to elect a senator to serve the term beginning on March 4, 1837. The results of the vote of both houses combined are as follows:

State legislature results
Party	Candidate	Votes	%
Democratic	James Buchanan (Inc.)	85	63.91
Whig	Thomas M. T. McKennan	24	18.05
Whig	Charles B. Penrose	21	15.79
Democratic	Thomas Cunningham	1	0.75
Democratic	Isaac Leet	1	0.75
N/A	Not voting	1	0.75
Totals		133	100.00%

Preceded by 1834	Pennsylvania U.S. Senate election (Class III); 1836	Succeeded by 1843
