= 1834 United States Senate special election in Pennsylvania =

Senate Special Election in the United States

The 1834 United States Senate special election in Pennsylvania was held on December 6, 1834. Future president of the United States James Buchanan was elected by the Pennsylvania General Assembly to the United States Senate.

== Background ==
Democrat William Wilkins was elected to the United States Senate by the Pennsylvania General Assembly, consisting of the House of Representatives and the Senate, in 1830. Sen. Wilkins resigned on June 30, 1834, after being appointed U.S. Minister to Russia by President Andrew Jackson.

== Results ==
Following the resignation of Sen. William Wilkins, the Pennsylvania General Assembly convened on December 6, 1834, to elect a new senator to fill the vacancy. Four ballots were recorded. The results of the fourth and final ballot of both houses combined are as follows:

State legislature results
Party	Candidate	Votes	%
Democratic	James Buchanan	66	49.62
Anti-Masonic	Amos Ellmaker	31	23.31
Democratic	James Clarke	26	19.55
National Republican	Joseph Lawrence	6	4.51
Democratic	Joel Sutherland	1	0.75
N/A	Not voting	3	2.26
Totals		133	100.00%

== See also ==
- 1834–35 United States Senate elections

Preceded by 1830	Pennsylvania U.S. Senate election (Class III); 1834	Succeeded by 1836
