= 1836–37 United States Senate elections =

- Dates vary by state
- Class 3

17 of the 52 seats in the United States Senate (plus special elections) 27 seats needed for a majority
	Majority party	Minority party	Third party
Party	Democratic	Whig	Nullifier
Last election	22 (Note: As the Jacksonian party)	24 (Note: As the National Republican party)	2
Seats before	31	19	2
Seats won	12	5	0
Seats after	34	17	1
Seat change	▲3	▼2	▼1
Seats up	9	7	1
- Results: Democratic gain Democratic hold Whig hold
Majority Party before election
Jacksonian
Elected Majority Party
Democratic

The 1836–37 United States Senate elections were held on various dates in various states. As these U.S. Senate elections were prior to the ratification of the Seventeenth Amendment in 1913, senators were chosen by state legislatures. Senators were elected over a wide range of time throughout 1836 and 1837, and a seat may have been filled months late or remained vacant due to legislative deadlock. In these elections, terms were up for the senators in Class 3.

In this election cycle, the Jacksonian coalition emerged as the Democratic Party, and the Adams, or Anti-Jackson, coalition emerged as the Whig Party.

== Results summary ==
Senate party division, 25th Congress (1837–1839)

- Majority party: Democratic (35)
- Minority party: Whig (17–16)
- Other parties: (0–1)
- Total seats: 52

== Change in composition ==
=== Before the special elections ===
				NR_{1}	NR_{2}	NR_{3}	NR_{4}	NR_{5}	NR_{6}
NR_{16}	NR_{15}	NR_{14}	NR_{13}	NR_{12}	NR_{11}	NR_{10}	NR_{9}	NR_{8}	NR_{7}
NR_{17} Del. Resigned	NR_{18} Del. Resigned	NR_{19} Md. Died	NR_{20} N.C. Resigned	NR_{21} La. Resigned	NR_{22} Va. Resigned	NR_{23} Va. Resigned	Ark. New	Ark. New	N_{2}
									N_{1}
J_{17}	J_{18}	J_{19}	J_{20}	J_{21}	J_{22} Mich. (Note: Michigan's senators were elected in 1835, but not seated until early 1837.)	J_{23} Mich.	J_{24} N.H. Resigned	V_{1} La.	N_{1}
J_{16}	J_{15}	J_{14}	J_{13}	J_{12}	J_{11}	J_{10}	J_{9}	J_{8}	J_{7}
				J_{1}	J_{2}	J_{3}	J_{4}	J_{5}	J_{6}

=== As a result of the special elections ===
				NR_{1}	NR_{2}	NR_{3}	NR_{4}	NR_{5}	NR_{6}
NR_{16}	NR_{15}	NR_{14}	NR_{13}	NR_{12}	NR_{11}	NR_{10}	NR_{9}	NR_{8}	NR_{7}
NR_{17} Del. Hold	NR_{18} Del. Hold	NR_{19} Md. Hold	N_{2}	N_{1}	J_{31} Va. Gain	J_{30} Va. Gain	J_{29} Ark. Gain	J_{28} Ark. Gain	J_{27} N.C. Gain
Majority →									J_{27} N.C. Gain
J_{17}	J_{18}	J_{19}	J_{20}	J_{21}	J_{22}	J_{23}	J_{24} N.H. Hold	J_{25} La. Gain	J_{26} La. Gain
J_{16}	J_{15}	J_{14}	J_{13}	J_{12}	J_{11}	J_{10}	J_{9}	J_{8}	J_{7}
				J_{1}	J_{2}	J_{3}	J_{4}	J_{5}	J_{6}

=== Before the regular elections ===
				NR_{1}	NR_{2}	NR_{3}	NR_{4}	NR_{5}	NR_{6}
NR_{16} Ohio; Ran	NR_{15} Ky. Ran	NR_{14} Ind. Ran	NR_{13} Ala. Ran	NR_{12}	NR_{11}	NR_{10}	NR_{9}	NR_{8}	NR_{7}
NR_{17} La. Ran	NR_{18} Vt. Ran	NR_{19} Conn. Unknown	N_{2} S.C. Ran	N_{1}	J_{31} Pa. Ran	J_{30} N.C. Ran	J_{29} N.Y. Ran	J_{28} N.H. Ran	J_{27} Mo. Ran
Majority →									J_{27} Mo. Ran
J_{17}	J_{18}	J_{19}	J_{20}	J_{21}	J_{22}	J_{23} Ark. Ran	J_{24} Ga. Ran	J_{25} Ill. Ran	J_{26} La. Ran
J_{16}	J_{15}	J_{14}	J_{13}	J_{12}	J_{11}	J_{10}	J_{9}	J_{8}	J_{7}
				J_{1}	J_{2}	J_{3}	J_{4}	J_{5}	J_{6}

=== As a result of the regular elections ===
"Hold" means the incumbent lost and the winner was from an affiliated new party, either Anti-Jacksonian to Whig or Jacksonian to Democratic.

				NR_{1}	NR_{2}	NR_{3}	NR_{4}	NR_{5}	NR_{6}
W_{16} Vt. Re-elected (was AJ)	W_{15} Ind. Hold (was AJ)	W_{14} La. Re-elected (was AJ)	W_{13} Ky. Re-elected (was AJ)	NR_{12}	NR_{11}	NR_{10}	NR_{9}	NR_{8}	NR_{7}
W_{17} S.C. Re-elected (was N)	N_{1}	D_{34} Ohio; Gain (was AJ)	D_{33} Conn. Gain (was AJ)	D_{32} Ala. Gain (was AJ)	D_{31} N.H. Hold (was J)	D_{30} Ill. Hold (was J)	D_{29} Pa. Re-elected (was J)	D_{28} N.C. Re-elected (was J)	D_{27} N.Y. Re-elected (was J)
Majority →									D_{27} N.Y. Re-elected (was J)
J_{17}	J_{18}	J_{19}	J_{20}	J_{21}	J_{22}	D_{23} Ark. Re-elected (was J)	D_{24} Ga. Re-elected (was J)	D_{25} La. Re-elected (was J)	D_{26} Mo. Re-elected (was J)
J_{16}	J_{15}	J_{14}	J_{13}	J_{12}	J_{11}	J_{10}	J_{9}	J_{8}	J_{7}
				J_{1}	J_{2}	J_{3}	J_{4}	J_{5}	J_{6}

=== Beginning of the next Congress ===
				W_{1} New party	W_{2} New party	W_{3} New party	W_{4} New party	W_{5} New party	W_{6} New party
W_{16}	W_{15}	W_{14}	W_{13}	W_{12} New party	W_{11} New party	W_{10} New party	W_{9} New party	W_{8} New party	W_{7} New party
W_{17}	D_{35} New party	D_{34}	D_{33}	D_{32}	D_{31}	D_{30}	D_{29}	D_{28}	D_{27}
Majority →									D_{27}
D_{17} New party	D_{18} New party	D_{19} New party	D_{20} New party	D_{21} New party	D_{22} New party	D_{23}	D_{24}	D_{25}	D_{26}
D_{16} New party	D_{15} New party	D_{14} New party	D_{13} New party	D_{12} New party	D_{11} New party	D_{10} New party	D_{9} New party	D_{8} New party	D_{7} New party
				D_{1} New party	D_{2} New party	D_{3} New party	D_{4} New party	D_{5} New party	D_{6} New party

Key:

NR_{#}	National Republican
J_{#}	Jacksonian
N_{#}	Nullfier

D_{#}	Democratic
W_{#}	Whig
V_{#}	Vacant

== Race summaries ==
Bold states link to specific election articles.

=== Elections seated during the 24th Congress ===
In these elections, senators were elected to finish terms already in progress either as special elections or as elections to a new state. senators were seated during 1836 or before March 4, 1837; ordered by election date.

State	Incumbent			Results	Candidates
State	Senator	Party	Electoral history	Results	Candidates
Louisiana (Class 2)	Vacant			Charles Gayarré had been elected but resigned due to ill health without having taken his seat. New senator elected January 13, 1836. Jacksonian gain. Winner served in the next Congress as a Democrat.	▌ ✓ Robert C. Nicholas (Jacksonian); [data missing]
Virginia (Class 1)	John Tyler	National; Republican	1827; 1833	Incumbent resigned February 29, 1836. New senator elected March 4, 1836. Jacksonian gain. Winner served in the next Congress as a Democrat.	▌ ✓ William C. Rives (Jacksonian); [data missing]
Connecticut (Class 1)	John M. Niles	Jacksonian	1835 (appointed)	Interim appointee elected May 6, 1836.	▌ ✓ John M. Niles (Jacksonian) 121; ▌William W. Ellsworth (National Republican) 57; ▌Andrew T. Judson (Jacksonian) 11; Scattering 13
New Hampshire (Class 3)	Isaac Hill	Jacksonian	1831	Incumbent resigned May 30, 1836 to become governor of New Hampshire. New senator elected June 8, 1836. Jacksonian hold. Winner lost re-election to the next term; see below.	▌ ✓ John Page (Jacksonian); [data missing]
Delaware (Class 1)	Arnold Naudain	National; Republican	1830 (special); 1832	Incumbent resigned June 16, 1836. New senator elected June 17, 1836. National Republican hold. Winner served in the next Congress as a Whig.	▌ ✓ Richard H. Bayard (National Republican); [data missing]
Arkansas (Class 2)	New seats			New state. New senator elected September 19, 1836. Jacksonian gain. Winner served in the next Congress as a Democrat.	▌ ✓ William S. Fulton (Jacksonian) 60 votes
Arkansas (Class 3)	New seats			New state. New senator elected September 19, 1836. Jacksonian gain. Winner was also re-elected to the next term; see below.	▌ ✓ Ambrose H. Sevier (Jacksonian) 56 votes; ▌H. F. Walworth (Unknown) 4 votes
North Carolina (Class 3)	Willie P. Mangum	National; Republican	1830	Incumbent resigned November 26, 1836. New senator elected December 5, 1836. Jacksonian gain. Winner was also elected to the next term; see below.	▌ ✓ Robert Strange (Jacksonian); [data missing]
Virginia (Class 2)	Benjamin W. Leigh	National; Republican	1834 (special); 1835	Incumbent resigned July 4, 1836. New senator elected December 12, 1836. Jacksonian gain. Winner would resign at the end of this Congress; see below.	▌ ✓ Richard E. Parker (Jacksonian); [data missing]
Maryland (Class 3)	Robert H. Goldsborough	National; Republican	1813; 1819 (retired or lost); 1835 (special)	Incumbent died October 5, 1836. New senator elected December 31, 1836. National Republican hold. Winner was also re-elected to the next term; see below.	▌ ✓ John S. Spence (National Republican); [data missing]
Delaware (Class 2)	John M. Clayton	National; Republican	1829; 1835	Incumbent resigned December 29, 1836. New senator elected January 9, 1837. National Republican hold. Winner served in the next Congress as a Whig.	▌ ✓ Thomas Clayton (National Republican); [data missing]
Louisiana (Class 3)	Alexander Porter	National; Republican	1833 (special)	Incumbent resigned January 5, 1837 due to ill health. New senator elected January 12, 1837. Jacksonian gain. Winner was also re-elected to the next term; see below.	▌ ✓ Alexandre Mouton (Jacksonian); [data missing]
Maine (Class 1)	Judah Dana	Jacksonian	1836 (appointed)	Interim appointee retired when elected successor qualified. New senator elected February 22, 1837. Jacksonian hold. Winner served in the next Congress as a Democrat.	▌ ✓ Reuel Williams (Jacksonian) 118; ▌George Evans (National Republican) 53; ▌Nathan Clifford (Jacksonian) 3; ▌Tristram Redman (Unknown) 1

=== Races leading to the 25th Congress ===
In these regular elections, the winner was seated on March 4, 1837; ordered by state.

All of the elections involved the Class 3 seats.

State	Incumbent			Results	Candidates
State	Senator	Party	Electoral history	Results	Candidates
Alabama	Gabriel Moore	Whig (National Republican)	1831	Incumbent lost re-election. New senator elected in 1837. Democratic gain.	▌ ✓ John McKinley (Democratic); ▌Gabriel Moore (Democratic); [data missing]
Arkansas	Ambrose Sevier	Democratic (Jacksonian)	1836 (new seat)	Incumbent re-elected in 1837.	▌ ✓ Ambrose Sevier (Democratic); [data missing]
Connecticut	Gideon Tomlinson	Whig (National Republican)	1831	Unknown if incumbent ran for re-election. New senator elected in 1836 or 1837. Democratic gain.	▌ ✓ Perry Smith (Democratic); [data missing]
Georgia	Alfred Cuthbert	Democratic (Jacksonian)	1835 (special)	Incumbent re-elected in 1837.	▌ ✓ Alfred Cuthbert (Democratic); [data missing]
Illinois	William Lee D. Ewing	Democratic (Jacksonian)	1835 (special)	Incumbent lost election. New senator elected in 1837. Democratic hold.	▌ ✓ Richard M. Young (Democratic); ▌William Lee D. Ewing (Democratic); [data missing]
Indiana	William Hendricks	Whig (National Republican)	1824; 1830	Incumbent lost re-election. New senator elected in 1836. Whig hold.	▌ ✓ Oliver H. Smith (Whig); ▌William Hendricks (Whig); [data missing]
Kentucky	Henry Clay	Whig (National Republican)	1806 (special); 1807 (retired); 1810 (appointed); 1811 (retired); 1831 (late)	Incumbent re-elected in 1836.	▌ ✓ Henry Clay (Whig); [data missing]
Louisiana	Alexandre Mouton	Democratic (Jacksonian)	1837 (special)	Incumbent re-elected in 1837.	▌ ✓ Alexandre Mouton (Democratic); [data missing]
Maryland	John S. Spence	Whig (National Republican)	1836 (special)	Incumbent re-elected in 1837.	▌ ✓ John S. Spence (Whig); [data missing]
Missouri	Lewis F. Linn	Democratic (Jacksonian)	1833 (appointed); 1834 (special)	Incumbent re-elected in 1836.	▌ ✓ Lewis F. Linn (Democratic); [data missing]
New Hampshire	John Page	Democratic (Jacksonian)	1836 (special)	Incumbent lost re-election. New senator elected in 1837. Democratic hold.	▌ ✓ Franklin Pierce (Democratic); [data missing]
New York	Silas Wright Jr.	Democratic (Jacksonian)	1826 (Late)	Incumbent re-elected February 7, 1837.	▌ ✓ Silas Wright Jr. (Democratic) 26+85; ▌Ambrose L. Jordan (Whig) 3+27
North Carolina	Willie P. Mangum	Whig (National Republican)	1830	Incumbent resigned November 26, 1836. New senator elected in 1836. Democratic gain. Successor also elected to finish the current term, see above.	▌ ✓ Robert Strange (Democratic); [data missing]
Ohio	Thomas Ewing	Whig (National Republican)	1830	Incumbent lost re-election. New senator elected in January 1837. Democratic gain.	▌ ✓ William Allen (Democratic); ▌Thomas Ewing (Whig); [data missing]
Pennsylvania	James Buchanan	Democratic (Jacksonian)	1834 (special)	Incumbent re-elected December 14, 1836.	▌ ✓ James Buchanan (Democratic) 85; ▌Thomas M. T. McKennan (Whig) 24; ▌Charles B. Penrose (Whig) 21; ▌Thomas Cunningham (Democratic) 1; ▌Isaac Leet (Democratic) 1; ▌Not voting 1
South Carolina	William C. Preston	Nullifier	1833 (special)	Incumbent re-elected in 1837 as a Whig.	▌ ✓ William C. Preston (Whig); [data missing]
Vermont	Samuel Prentiss	Whig (National Republican)	1831	Incumbent re-elected in 1837.	▌ ✓ Samuel Prentiss (Whig); [data missing]

=== Elections during the 25th Congress ===
In these special elections, the winners were seated in 1837 after March 4; ordered by election date.

State	Incumbent			Results	Candidates
State	Senator	Party	Electoral history	Results	Candidates
Virginia (Class 2)	Richard E. Parker	Democratic	1836 (special)	Incumbent resigned March 4, 1837 to become judge of the Supreme Court of Virginia. New senator elected March 14, 1837. Democratic hold.	▌ ✓ William H. Roane (Democratic); [data missing]
Alabama (Class 3)	John McKinley	Democratic	1833 (special)	Incumbent resigned April 22, 1837 to become associate justice of the U.S. Supreme Court. New senator elected June 19, 1837. Democratic hold.	▌ ✓ Clement C. Clay (Democratic); [data missing]
Georgia (Class 2)	John Pendleton King	Democratic	1833 (special)	Incumbent resigned November 1, 1837. New senator elected November 22, 1837. Democratic hold.	▌ ✓ Wilson Lumpkin (Democratic) 55.10%; ▌John M. Berrien (Whig) 39.18%; ▌Daniel M. Stewart (Democratic) 1.63%; Scattering 4.08%

== Alabama ==
There were two elections in Alabama in this cycle, both for the same seat.

=== Alabama (regular) ===
First-term senator Anti-Jacksonian Gabriel Moore lost re-election in November 1836 to Jacksonian John McKinley.

=== Alabama (special) ===
Shortly after the new term started, Jacksonian-now-Democrat John McKinley resigned to become associate justice of the U.S. Supreme Court. He was replaced by fellow Democrat Clement C. Clay in a June 19, 1837 special election.

Clay would serve only until November 15, 1841, when he, too, resigned.

== Arkansas ==
1836 United States Senate election in Arkansas
- September 19, 1836

68 members of the Arkansas General Assembly
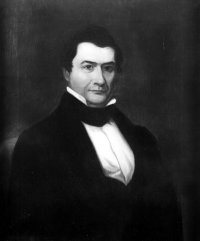

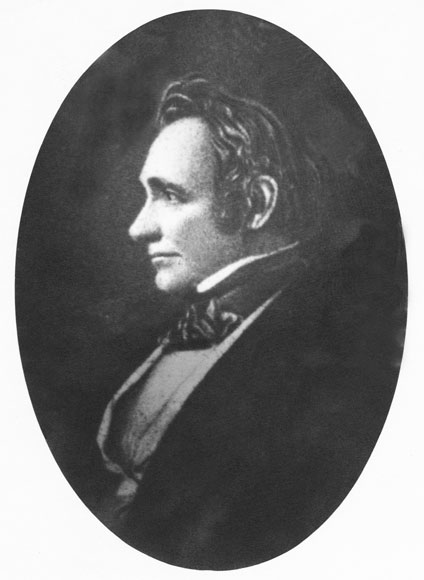
Candidate	Ambrose H. Sevier	William S. Fulton	Horace F. Walworth
Party	Jacksonian	Jacksonian
Legislative vote	60	56	4
Percentage	88.2%	82.3%	5.9%

Arkansas became a new state and elected its two senators in a joint session of the Arkansas General Assembly on September 19, 1836.

Jacksonian former Governor of Arkansas Territory William Fulton was elected to the Class 2 seat, with the term ending March 3, 1841.

Jacksonian former delegate Ambrose Sevier was elected to the Class 3 seat, with the term ending March 3, 1837.

Sevier was also re-elected in 1837 to the next term that would end in 1843.

== Connecticut ==
There were two elections in Connecticut in this cycle.

== Georgia ==
There were two elections in Georgia in this cycle.

== Louisiana ==
There were two elections in Louisiana in this cycle, both for the same seat.

Anti-Jacksonian Alexander Porter resigned on January 5, 1837, due to ill health.

=== Louisiana (special) ===
Jacksonian Alexandre Mouton was elected on January 12, 1837, to finish Porter's term ending on March 3, 1837.

=== Louisiana (regular) ===
Jacksonian Alexandre Mouton was also elected as a Democrat in 1837 (possibly re-elected) to the next term, beginning on March 4, 1837.

== Maryland ==
=== Maryland (special) ===
1836 United States Senate special election in Maryland
- December 1836

80 members of the Maryland General Assembly
Candidate	John S. Spence
Party	Whig
Legislative vote	-
Percentage	-%	%

Anti-Jacksonian Robert Henry Goldsborough died on October 5, 1836. Anti-Jacksonian John S. Spence was elected in late 1836 to finish Goldsborough's term ending on March 3, 1837.

=== Maryland (regular) ===
1837 United States Senate election in Maryland
- December 1837

80 members of the Maryland General Assembly
Candidate	John S. Spence
Party	Whig
Legislative vote	-
Percentage	-%	%

John S. Spence won election to a full term by an unknown margin of votes, for the Class 3 seat.

== New York ==
Silas Wright Jr., had been elected in 1833 to this seat after the resignation of William L. Marcy, who had been elected governor of New York. Wright's term would expire on March 3, 1837.

At the state election in November 1836, 94 Democrats and 34 Whigs were elected to the Assembly, and seven of the eight state senators elected were Democrats. The 60th New York State Legislature met from January 3 to May 16, 1837, at Albany. The party strength in the Assembly as shown by the election for speaker was 80 for Democrat Edward Livingston and 27 for Whig Luther Bradish.

Wright was re-nominated in a Democratic caucus by a large majority. Silas Wright Jr., was the choice of both the Assembly and the Senate, and was declared elected.

House	Democratic		Whig	
State Senate (32 members)	Silas Wright Jr.	26	Ambrose L. Jordan	3
State Assembly (128 members)	Silas Wright Jr.	85	Ambrose L. Jordan	27

== North Carolina ==
There were two elections in North Carolina in this cycle, both for the same seat.

Anti-Jacksonian Willie P. Mangum resigned on November 26, 1836.

=== North Carolina (special) ===
Jacksonian Robert Strange was elected in late 1836 to finish Mangum's term ending March 3, 1837.

=== North Carolina (regular) ===
Jacksonian Robert Strange was also elected as a Democrat in 1836, to the next term, beginning March 4, 1837.

== Pennsylvania ==
The Pennsylvania General Assembly convened on December 14, 1836, to elect a senator to serve the term beginning on March 4, 1837. The results of the vote of both houses combined are as follows:

Pennsylvania General Assembly results
Party	Candidate	Votes	%
Democratic	James Buchanan (incumbent)	85	63.91
Whig	Thomas M. T. McKennan	24	18.05
Whig	Charles B. Penrose	21	15.79
Democratic	Thomas Cunningham	1	0.75
Democratic	Isaac Leet	1	0.75
N/A	Not voting	1	0.75
Totals		133	100.00%

== Virginia (special) ==
There were three special elections in Virginia in this cycle.

=== Virginia (special, class 1) ===
Two-term Anti-Jacksonian (and future president) John Tyler resigned on February 29, 1836, due to policial differences and conflict with the Virginia House of Delegates, which had come under control of the rival Jacksonians.

Former Jacksonian senator William C. Rives (who had served in the class 2 seat from December 10, 1832, to February 22, 1834) was elected on March 4, 1836, to finish Tyler's term that would end on March 3, 1839.

=== Virginia (special, class 2 1836) ===
Anti-Jacksonian Benjamin W. Leigh, who had served in the seat since an 1834 special election and was re-elected in 1835, resigned on July 4, 1836, to return to his private legal practice.

Jacksonian Richard E. Parker was elected on December 12, 1836, but would only remain in the seat for four months.

=== Virginia (special, class 2 1837) ===
Parker, now a Democrat, was elected to the Virginia Supreme Court of Appeals and so he resigned from the Senate March 13, 1837.

Fellow Democrat William H. Roane was elected March 14, 1837 to finish the term that would end March 3, 1841.

== See also ==
- 1836 United States elections
  - 1836 United States presidential election
  - 1836–37 United States House of Representatives elections
- 24th United States Congress
- 25th United States Congress
