= 1834–35 United States Senate elections =

- Dates vary by state
- Class 2

16 of the 48 seats in the United States Senate (plus special elections) 25 seats needed for a majority
	Majority party	Minority party	Third party
Party	National Republican	Jacksonian	Nullifier
Last election	23 seats	21 seats	2 seats
Seats before	26	20	2
Seats won	6	8	1
Seats after	24	22	2
Seat change	▼2	▲2	Steady
Seats up	8	7	1
- Results: Jacksonian Hold Jacksonian Gain; Anti-Jacksonian Hold Anti-Jacksonian Gain; Nullifier Hold Legislature Failed To Elect
Majority Party before election
Anti-Jacksonian
Elected Majority Party
Anti-Jacksonian

The 1834–35 United States Senate elections were held on various dates in various states. As these U.S. Senate elections were prior to the ratification of the Seventeenth Amendment in 1913, senators were chosen by state legislatures. Senators were elected over a wide range of time throughout 1834 and 1835, and a seat may have been filled months late or remained vacant due to legislative deadlock. In these elections, terms were up for the senators in Class 2.

The Anti-Jackson coalition maintained control of the Senate. However, during the 24th Congress, the Jacksonian coalition gained control of the Senate.

== Results summary ==
Senate party division, 24th Congress (1835–1837)

- Majority party: Jacksonian (21–31)
- Minority party: Anti-Jackson (24–19)
- Other parties: Nullifier (2)
- Total seats: 48–52

== Change in composition ==
=== Before the elections ===
						NR_{1}	NR_{2}	NR_{3}	NR_{4}
NR_{14}	NR_{13}	NR_{12}	NR_{11}	NR_{10}	NR_{9}	NR_{8}	NR_{7}	NR_{6}	NR_{5}
NR_{15}	NR_{16}	NR_{17}	NR_{18}	NR_{19} Del. Ran	NR_{20} Miss. Ran	NR_{21} R.I. Ran	NR_{22} Va. Ran	NR_{23} La. Unknown	NR_{24} N.J. Unknown
Majority →									NR_{25} Mass. Retired
J_{15} Ga. Ran	J_{16} Ill. Ran	J_{17} N.C. Ran	J_{18} Tenn. Ran	J_{19} Ky. Unknown	N_{1}	N_{2} S.C. Ran	NR_{27} Maine Resigned	NR_{26} N.H. Retired	NR_{25} Mass. Retired
J_{14} Ala. Ran	J_{13}	J_{12}	J_{11}	J_{10}	J_{9}	J_{8}	J_{7}	J_{6}	J_{5}
						J_{1}	J_{2}	J_{3}	J_{4}

=== Result of the regular elections ===
						NR_{1}	NR_{2}	NR_{3}	NR_{4}
NR_{14}	NR_{13}	NR_{12}	NR_{11}	NR_{10}	NR_{9}	NR_{8}	NR_{7}	NR_{6}	NR_{5}
NR_{15}	NR_{16}	NR_{17}	NR_{18}	NR_{19} Del. Re-elected	NR_{20} R.I. Re-elected	NR_{21} Va. Re-elected	NR_{22} Mass. Hold	NR_{23} Ky. Gain	NR_{24} Tenn. Re-elected to different party
Plurality →									NR_{24} Tenn. Re-elected to different party
J_{15} Ga. Re-elected	J_{16} Ill. Re-elected	J_{17} N.C. Re-elected	J_{18} Maine Gain	J_{19} Miss. Gain	J_{20} N.H. Gain	J_{21} N.J. Gain	N_{1}	N_{2} S.C. Re-elected	V_{1} La. NR Loss (Note: Winner was elected but resigned without having been seated.)
J_{14} Ala. Re-elected	J_{13}	J_{12}	J_{11}	J_{10}	J_{9}	J_{8}	J_{7}	J_{6}	J_{5}
						J_{1}	J_{2}	J_{3}	J_{4}

Key:

NR_{#}	= National Republican
J_{#}	= Jacksonian
N_{#}	= Nullfier
V_{#}	= Vacant

== Race summaries ==
=== Special elections during the 23rd Congress ===
In these special elections, the winners were seated during 1834 or before March 4, 1835; ordered by election date.

State	Incumbent			Results	Candidates
State	Senator	Party	Electoral history	Results	Candidates
Virginia (Class 2)	William Rives	Jacksonian	1832 (special)	Incumbent resigned February 22, 1834. Successor elected February 26, 1834. Winner was also elected to the next term; see below. National Republican gain.	▌ ✓ Benjamin W. Leigh (National Republican); [data missing]
Missouri (Class 3)	Lewis F. Linn	Jacksonian	1833 (appointed)	Interim appointee elected November 20, 1834.	▌ ✓ Lewis F. Linn (Jacksonian); [data missing]
Pennsylvania (Class 3)	William Wilkins	Jacksonian	1832	Incumbent resigned June 30, 1834, to become U.S. Minister to Russia. New senator elected December 6, 1834. Jacksonian hold.	▌ ✓ James Buchanan (Jacksonian) 66 (49.62%); ▌Amos Ellmaker (National Republican) 31 (23.31%); ▌James Clarke (Jacksonian) 26 (19.55%); ▌Joseph Lawrence (National Republican) 6 (4.51%); ▌Joel Sutherland (Jacksonian) 1 (0.75%); ▌Not voting 3 (2.26%)
Georgia (Class 3)	John Forsyth	Jacksonian	1818 (special); 1819 (resigned); 1829 (special); 1830 or 1831	Incumbent resigned June 27, 1834, to become U.S. Minister to Spain. New senator elected January 12, 1835. Jacksonian hold.	▌ ✓ Alfred Cuthbert (Jacksonian); [data missing]
Maryland (Class 3)	Ezekiel F. Chambers	National; Republican	1826 (special); 1831	Incumbent resigned December 20, 1834, to become judge of the Maryland Court of Appeals. New senator elected January 13, 1835. National Republican hold.	▌ ✓ Robert Henry Goldsborough (National Republican); [data missing]
Maine (Class 2)	Peleg Sprague	National; Republican	1829	Incumbent resigned January 1, 1835. New senator elected January 20, 1835. Successor was also elected to the next term; see below. Jacksonian gain.	▌ ✓ John Ruggles (Jacksonian); [data missing]

=== Races leading to the 24th Congress ===
In these regular elections, the winner was seated on March 4, 1835; ordered by state.

All of the elections involved the Class 2 seats.

State	Incumbent			Results	Candidates
State	Senator	Party	Electoral history	Results	Candidates
Alabama	William R. King	Jacksonian	1819; 1822; 1828	Incumbent re-elected in 1834.	▌ ✓ William R. King (Jacksonian); [data missing]
Delaware	John M. Clayton	National; Republican	1827 (special); 1829	Incumbent re-elected in 1835.	▌ ✓ John M. Clayton (National Republican); [data missing]
Georgia	John Pendleton King	Jacksonian	1833 (special)	Incumbent re-elected in 1834.	▌ ✓ John Pendleton King (Jacksonian); [data missing]
Illinois	John M. Robinson	Jacksonian	1830 (special)	Incumbent re-elected December 20, 1834.	▌ ✓ John M. Robinson (Jacksonian) 47; ▌Richard M. Young (Jacksonian) 30; ▌William Beatty Archer (Jacksonian) 4
Kentucky	George M. Bibb	Jacksonian	1829	Incumbent retired. New senator elected January 9, 1835. National Republican gain.	▌ ✓ John J. Crittenden (National Republican) 94; ▌James Guthrie (Jacksonian) 40
Louisiana	George A. Waggaman	National; Republican	1831 (special)	Unknown if incumbent ran for re-election. New senator elected in 1835, but resigned due to ill health before being seated. National Republican loss.	▌ ✓ Charles Gayarré (Jacksonian); [data missing]
Maine	Peleg Sprague	National; Republican	1829	Incumbent resigned December 20, 1834, to become judge of the Maryland Court of Appeals. New senator elected January 19, 1835. Jacksonian gain. Successor was also elected to finish the term; see above.	▌ ✓ John Ruggles (Jacksonian) 73.91%; ▌George Evans (National Republican) 26.09%
Massachusetts	Nathaniel Silsbee	National; Republican	1826 (special); 1828	Incumbent retired. New senator elected in 1835. National Republican hold.	▌ ✓ John Davis (National Republican); [data missing]
Mississippi	George Poindexter	National; Republican	1830 (appointed); 1830 (special)	Incumbent lost re-election. New senator elected in 1835. Jacksonian gain.	▌ ✓ Robert J. Walker (Jacksonian); [data missing]
New Hampshire	Samuel Bell	National; Republican	1823	Incumbent retired. New senator elected in 1835. Jacksonian gain.	▌ ✓ Henry Hubbard (Jacksonian); [data missing]
New Jersey	Theodore Frelinghuysen	National; Republican	1829	incumbent defeatd for re-election. New senator elected in 1835. Jacksonian gain.	▌ ✓ Garret D. Wall (Jacksonian) 35; ▌Theodore Frelinghuysen (National Republican) 28
North Carolina	Bedford Brown	Jacksonian	1829 (special)	Incumbent re-elected in 1835.	▌ ✓ Bedford Brown (Jacksonian); [data missing]
Rhode Island	Nehemiah R. Knight	National; Republican	1821 (special); 1823; 1829	Incumbent re-elected May 13, 1835.	▌ ✓ Nehemiah R. Knight (National Republican) 41 votes; ▌Elisha Reynolds Potter (Unknown) 38 votes
South Carolina	John C. Calhoun	Nullifier	1832 (special)	Incumbent re-elected in 1834.	▌ ✓ John C. Calhoun (Nullifier); [data missing]
Tennessee	Hugh Lawson White	Jacksonian	1825 (special); 1829	Incumbent re-elected in 1835 as National Republican. National Republican gain.	▌ ✓ Hugh Lawson White (National Republican); [data missing]
Virginia	Benjamin W. Leigh	National; Republican	1834 (special)	Incumbent re-elected in 1835.	▌ ✓ Benjamin W. Leigh (National Republican); [data missing]

=== Special elections during the 24th Congress ===
In this special election, the winner was seated in 1835 after March 4; ordered by election date.

State	Incumbent			Results	Candidates
State	Senator	Party	Electoral history	Results	Candidates
Illinois (Class 3)	Elias Kane	Jacksonian	1824; 1830	Incumbent died December 12, 1835. New senator elected December 29, 1835 on the twelfth ballot. Jacksonian hold.	▌ ✓ William Lee D. Ewing (Jacksonian) 40; ▌James Semple (Jacksonian) 37; ▌Alexander M. Jenkins (Jacksonian) 1

=== Early elections during the 24th Congress ===
In these elections, the winners were not seated until 1837.

State	Incumbent			Results	Candidates
State	Senator	Party	Electoral history	Results	Candidates
Michigan (Class 1)	None (new state)			New state. New senator was elected in November 1835 but not seated until January 6, 1837, due to a territorial dispute with Ohio. Jacksonian gain.	▌ ✓ Lucius Lyon (Jacksonian); [data missing]
Michigan (Class 2)	None (new state)			New state. New senator was elected in November 1835 but not seated until January 6, 1837, due to a territorial dispute with Ohio. Jacksonian gain.	▌ ✓ John Norvell (Jacksonian); [data missing]

== Georgia ==
Georgia had two elections this cycle: a regular election for the class 2 seat and a special election for the class 3 seat.

=== Georgia (regular) ===
In the class 2 seat, incumbent Jacksonian John Pendleton King, who had served since winning an 1833 special election, was re-elected sometime in 1834.

=== Georgia (special) ===
In the class 3 seat, incumbent Jacksonian John Forsyth, who had served since winning an 1829 special election, resigned June 27, 1834, to become U.S. Minister to Spain.

Jacksonian Alfred Cuthbert was elected January 12, 1835.

== Illinois ==
There were two elections in Illinois this cycle.

== Maine ==
Maine had two elections this cycle, both for the class 2 seat.

Incumbent Anti-Jacksonian Peleg Sprague, who was elected in 1829, resigned January 1, 1835.

Jacksonian John Ruggles won both elections.

=== Maine (regular) ===
Jacksonian John Ruggles was elected January 19, 1835, to the next term. He was then elected to finish the current term, see below.

=== Maine (special) ===
Jacksonian John Ruggles was elected January 20, 1835, to finish the term that would end March 3, 1835.

== Maryland (special) ==
1835 United States Senate special election in Maryland
- January 7, 1835

80 members of the Maryland General Assembly
Candidate	Robert H. Goldsborough	No votes
Party	National Republican
Legislative vote	53	15
Percentage	80.95%	17.86%

Ezekiel F. Chambers won election over non-voters by a margin of 63.10%, or 53 votes, for the Class 3 seat.

== Michigan ==
The new state of Michigan elected its new senators in 1835, both Jacksonians: Lucius Lyon (Class 1) and John Norvell (Class 2). They were not seated until January 26, 1837, due to a territorial dispute with Ohio.

== Virginia ==
Virginia had two elections this cycle, both for the class 2 seat.

Incumbent Jacksonian William Rives, who had just won the 1832 special election, resigned February 22, 1834.

Anti-Jacksonian Benjamin W. Leigh won both elections.

=== Virginia (regular) ===
Anti-Jacksonian Benjamin W. Leigh was re-elected sometime in 1835 to the next term.

=== Virginia (special) ===
Anti-Jacksonian Benjamin W. Leigh was elected February 26, 1834, to finish the term that would end March 3, 1835. He was then elected to the next term, see above.

== See also ==
- 1834 United States elections
  - 1834–35 United States House of Representatives elections
- 23rd United States Congress
- 24th United States Congress

== Sources ==
- Party Division in the Senate, 1789-Present, via Senate.gov
