= 1830–31 United States Senate elections =

- Dates vary by state
- Class 3

16 of the 48 seats in the United States Senate (plus special elections) 25 seats needed for a majority
	Majority party	Minority party
Party	Jacksonian	Anti-Jacksonian
Last election	26 seats	19 seats
Seats before	25	23
Seats won	8	6
Seats after	26	20
Seat change	▲1	▼3
Seats up	7	9
	Third party
Party	Nullifier
Seats before	New party
Seats won	1
Seats after	1
Seat change	▲1
Seats up	0
- Results: Jacksonian Hold Jacksonian Gain; Anti-Jacksonian Hold Anti-Jacksonian Gain; Nullifier Gain Legislature Failed To Elect
Majority Party before election
Jacksonian
Elected Majority Party
Jacksonian

The 1830–31 United States Senate elections were held on various dates in various states. As these U.S. Senate elections were prior to the ratification of the Seventeenth Amendment in 1913, senators were chosen by state legislatures. Senators were elected over a wide range of time throughout 1830 and 1831, and a seat may have been filled months late or remained vacant due to legislative deadlock. In these elections, terms were up for the senators in Class 3.

The Jacksonians gained one seat from the Anti-Jacksonian coalition, but lost one seat to the short-lived Nullifier Party. By the time Congress first met in December 1831, however, the Jacksonians had a net loss of one seat.

== Results summary ==
Senate party division, 22nd Congress (1831–1833)

- Majority party: Jacksonian (24–23)
- Minority party: Anti-Jackson (21–23)
- Other parties: Nullifier (2–1)
- Total seats: 48

== Change in composition ==
=== Before the elections ===
After the January 7, 1830 special election in Delaware.

						AJ_{1}	AJ_{2}	AJ_{3}	AJ_{4}
AJ_{14}	AJ_{13}	AJ_{12}	AJ_{11}	AJ_{10}	AJ_{9}	AJ_{8}	AJ_{7}	AJ_{6}	AJ_{5}
AJ_{15} Ind. Ran	AJ_{16} La. Ran	AJ_{17} Md. Ran	AJ_{18} Mo. Ran	AJ_{19} N.Y. Ran	AJ_{20} Pa. Ran	AJ_{21} Conn. Unknown	AJ_{22} Vt. Unknown	AJ_{23} Ohio; Retired	J_{25} N.C. Retired
Majority →									J_{24} N.H. Unknown
J_{15}	J_{16}	J_{17}	J_{18}	J_{19} Ala. Ran	J_{20} Ga. Ran	J_{21} Ill. Ran	J_{22} S.C. Ran	J_{23} Ky. Ran	J_{24} N.H. Unknown
J_{14}	J_{13}	J_{12}	J_{11}	J_{10}	J_{9}	J_{8}	J_{7}	J_{6}	J_{5}
						J_{1}	J_{2}	J_{3}	J_{4}

=== As a result of the elections ===
						AJ_{1}	AJ_{2}	AJ_{3}	AJ_{4}
AJ_{14}	AJ_{13}	AJ_{12}	AJ_{11}	AJ_{10}	AJ_{9}	AJ_{8}	AJ_{7}	AJ_{6}	AJ_{5}
AJ_{15} Ind. Re-elected	AJ_{16} La. Re-elected	AJ_{17} Md. Re-elected	AJ_{18} Ala. Hold	AJ_{19} Conn. Hold	AJ_{20} Ohio; Hold	V_{1} Ky. J Loss	N_{1} S.C. Gain	J_{26} Pa. Gain	J_{25} N.Y. Gain
Majority →									J_{24} Mo. Gain
J_{15}	J_{16}	J_{17}	J_{18}	J_{19} Ga. Re-elected	J_{20} Ill. Re-elected	J_{21} N.H. Hold	J_{22} N.C. Hold	J_{23} Vt. Hold	J_{24} Mo. Gain
J_{14}	J_{13}	J_{12}	J_{11}	J_{10}	J_{9}	J_{8}	J_{7}	J_{6}	J_{5}
						J_{1}	J_{2}	J_{3}	J_{4}

=== At the beginning of the first session, December 5, 1831 ===
						AJ_{1}	AJ_{2}	AJ_{3}	AJ_{4}
AJ_{14}	AJ_{13}	AJ_{12}	AJ_{11}	AJ_{10}	AJ_{9}	AJ_{8}	AJ_{7}	AJ_{6}	AJ_{5}
AJ_{15}	AJ_{16}	AJ_{17}	AJ_{18}	AJ_{19}	AJ_{20}	AJ_{21} (Note: Kentucky class 3 seat: Legislature elected Anti-Jacksonian late in the Congress, on November 10, 1831.); Gain	AJ_{22} (Note: Indiana class 1 seat: Jacksonian died February 26, 1831, in the previous Congress, and an Anti-Jacksonian Senator was appointed August 19, 1831.); Gain	N_{1}	N_{2} S.C. Changed
Plurality (Note: The Jacksonians maintained Senate control as evidenced by their electing Jacksonians as Presidents pro tempore: Samuel Smith, Littleton W. Tazewell, and Hugh Lawson White.) →									J_{24}
J_{15}	J_{16}	J_{17}	J_{18}	J_{19}	J_{20}	J_{21}	J_{22}	J_{23}	J_{24}
J_{14}	J_{13}	J_{12}	J_{11}	J_{10}	J_{9}	J_{8}	J_{7}	J_{6}	J_{5}
						J_{1}	J_{2}	J_{3}	J_{4}

Key:

AJ_{#}	= Anti-Jacksonian
J_{#}	= Jacksonian
N_{#}	= Nullfier
V_{#}	= Vacant

== Race summaries ==
Bold states link to specific election articles.

=== Special elections during the 21st Congress ===
In these special elections, the winners were seated during 1830 or before March 4, 1831; ordered by election date.

State	Incumbent			Results	Candidates
State	Senator	Party	Electoral history	Results	Candidates
Mississippi (Class 2)	Thomas B. Reed	Jacksonian	1826 (special); 1827 (lost); 1828	Incumbent died November 26, 1829. Winner elected January 6, 1830. Jacksonian hold.	▌ ✓ Robert H. Adams (Jacksonian); [data missing]
Delaware (Class 1)	Louis McLane	Jacksonian	1827	Incumbent resigned April 29, 1829 to become U.S. Minister to the United Kingdom. Winner elected January 7, 1830. Anti-Jacksonian gain.	▌ ✓ Arnold Naudain (Anti-Jacksonian); [data missing]
Mississippi (Class 2)	George Poindexter	Jacksonian	1830 (appointed)	Interim appointee elected November 18, 1830.	▌ ✓ George Poindexter (Jacksonian) 41; ▌ Joshua Child (Unknown) 6
Illinois (Class 2)	David J. Baker	Jacksonian	1830 (appointed)	Incumbent appointee retired when elected successor qualified. Winner elected December 11, 1830 on the fifth ballot. Jacksonian hold.	▌ ✓ John M. Robinson (Jacksonian) 34; ▌Thomas Mather (Unknown) 15; ▌Richard M. Young (Jacksonian) 1; ▌Shadrach Bond (Unknown) 1; ▌Theophilus W. Smith (Unknown) 1

=== Races leading to the 22nd Congress ===
In these regular elections, the winner was seated on March 4, 1831 (except where noted due to late election); ordered by state.

All of the elections involved the Class 3 seats.

State	Incumbent			Results	Candidates
State	Senator	Party	Electoral history	Results	Candidates
Alabama	John McKinley	Jacksonian	1826 (special)	Incumbent lost re-election. Winner elected in 1831. Jacksonian hold.	▌ ✓ Gabriel Moore (Jacksonian); ▌John McKinley (Jacksonian); [data missing]
Connecticut	Calvin Willey	Anti-Jacksonian	1825	Unknown if incumbent ran for re-election. Winner elected May 20, 1830. Anti-Jacksonian hold.	▌ ✓ Gideon Tomlinson (Anti-Jacksonian) 158; ▌R. M. Sherman (Unknown) 20; Scattering 17
Georgia	John Forsyth	Jacksonian	1829 (special)	Incumbent re-elected in 1830 or 1831.	▌ ✓ John Forsyth (Jacksonian); [data missing]
Illinois	Elias Kane	Jacksonian	1824	Incumbent re-elected December 11, 1830.	▌ ✓ Elias K. Kane (Jacksonian) 42; ▌John M. Robinson (Jacksonian) 6; ▌William McHenry (Unknown) 1; ▌Timothy Guard (Unknown) 1; ▌Conrad Will (Unknown) 1; ▌D.J. Baker (Unknown) 1
Indiana	William Hendricks	Anti-Jacksonian	1824	Incumbent re-elected December 18, 1830 on the fourth ballot.	▌ ✓ William Hendricks (Anti-Jacksonian) 44; ▌ Ratliff Boon (Jacksonian) 26; ▌ John Law (Jacksonian) 9; ▌ Charles Dewey (Jacksonian) 3
Kentucky	John Rowan	Jacksonian	1824	Legislature elected late. Jacksonian loss.	[data missing]
Louisiana	Josiah S. Johnston	Anti-Jacksonian	1824 (appointed); 1825	Incumbent re-elected in 1831.	▌ ✓ Josiah S. Johnston (Anti-Jacksonian); [data missing]
Maryland	Ezekiel F. Chambers	Anti-Jacksonian	1826 (special)	Incumbent re-elected in 1831.	▌ ✓ Ezekiel F. Chambers (Anti-Jacksonian); [data missing]
Missouri	David Barton	Anti-Jacksonian	1821; 1825	Incumbent lost re-election. Winner elected in 1830. Jacksonian gain.	▌ ✓ Alexander Buckner (Jacksonian); ▌David Barton (Anti-Jacksonian); [data missing]
New Hampshire	Levi Woodbury	Jacksonian	1825	Unknown if incumbent ran for re-election. Winner elected in 1831. Jacksonian hold.	▌ ✓ Isaac Hill (Jacksonian); [data missing]
New York	Nathan Sanford	Anti-Jacksonian	1826 (late)	Incumbent lost re-election. Winner elected February 1, 1831. Jacksonian gain.	▌ ✓ William L. Marcy (Jacksonian) 20+86; ▌Samuel Works (Anti-Masonic) 5+27; ▌Nathan Sanford (Anti-Jacksonian) 0+1
North Carolina	James Iredell Jr.	Jacksonian	1828 (special)	Incumbent retired. Winner elected in 1830. Jacksonian hold.	▌ ✓ Willie P. Mangum (Jacksonian); [data missing]
Ohio	Jacob Burnet	Anti-Jacksonian	1828 (special)	Incumbent retired. Winner elected in 1830. Anti-Jacksonian hold.	▌ ✓ Thomas Ewing (Anti-Jacksonian) 54; ▌Micajah T. Williams (Jacksonian) 51; ▌Edward King (Anti-Jacksonian) 2
Pennsylvania	William Marks	Anti-Jacksonian	1825	Incumbent lost re-election. Winner elected in 1830 or 1831. Jacksonian gain.	▌ ✓ William Wilkins (Jacksonian); ▌William Marks (Anti-Jacksonian); [data missing]
South Carolina	William Smith	Jacksonian	1826 (special)	Incumbent lost re-election. Winner elected in 1830 or 1831. Nullifier gain.	▌ ✓ Stephen D. Miller (Nullifier); ▌William Smith (Jacksonian); [data missing]
Vermont	Dudley Chase	Anti-Jacksonian	1825	Unknown if incumbent ran for re-election. Winner elected in 1831. Anti-Jacksonian hold.	▌ ✓ Samuel Prentiss (Anti-Jacksonian); [data missing]

=== Elections during the 22nd Congress ===
In these special elections, the winners were seated in 1831 after March 4; ordered by election date.

State	Incumbent			Results	Candidates
State	Senator	Party	Electoral history	Results	Candidates
Kentucky (Class 3)	Vacant			Legislature elected late. New senator elected November 10, 1831. Anti-Jacksonian gain.	▌ ✓ Henry Clay (Anti-Jacksonian) 73; ▌Richard M. Johnson (Jacksonian) 64; ▌Worden Pope (Unknown) 1
Louisiana (Class 2)	Edward Livingston	Jacksonian	1828 or 1829	Incumbent resigned May 24, 1831 to become U.S. Secretary of State. Winner elected November 15, 1831. Anti-Jacksonian gain.	▌ ✓ George A. Waggaman (Anti-Jacksonian); [data missing]
Pennsylvania (Class 1)	Isaac D. Barnard	Jacksonian	1826	Incumbent resigned December 6, 1831 due to ill health. Winner elected December 13, 1831. Jacksonian hold.	▌ ✓ George M. Dallas (Jacksonian) 67; ▌Joseph Hemphill (Jacksonian) 34; ▌Richard Rush (Anti-Masonic) 30; ▌Samuel B. Davis (Jacksonian) 1; Not voting 1

== Illinois ==
Illinois had two elections in this cycle: one for each seat.

=== Illinois (regular) ===
For the Class 3 seat, one-term incumbent Jacksonian Elias Kane was re-elected on December 11, 1830, for the term beginning March 4, 1831.

=== Illinois (special) ===
For the Class 2 seat, Jacksonian incumbent John McLean, who had been elected in 1828 or 1829, died October 14, 1830. Jacksonian David J. Baker was appointed November 12, 1830 to continue the term until a special election. On December 11, 1830, Jacksonian John McCracken Robinson was elected to finish the term and was seated January 4, 1831.

== Kentucky ==
Kentucky had two elections in this cycle.

When Jacksonian John Rowan's term ended March 3, 1831, the legislature had not yet voted a replacement. When the legislature resumed for its session in November 1831, Anti-Jacksonian Henry Clay was elected, but still in time to participate when the 22nd Congress convened in December 1831.

== Louisiana ==
Louisiana had two elections in this cycle.

== Maryland ==
1831 United States Senate election in Maryland
- February 24, 1831

80 members of the Maryland General Assembly
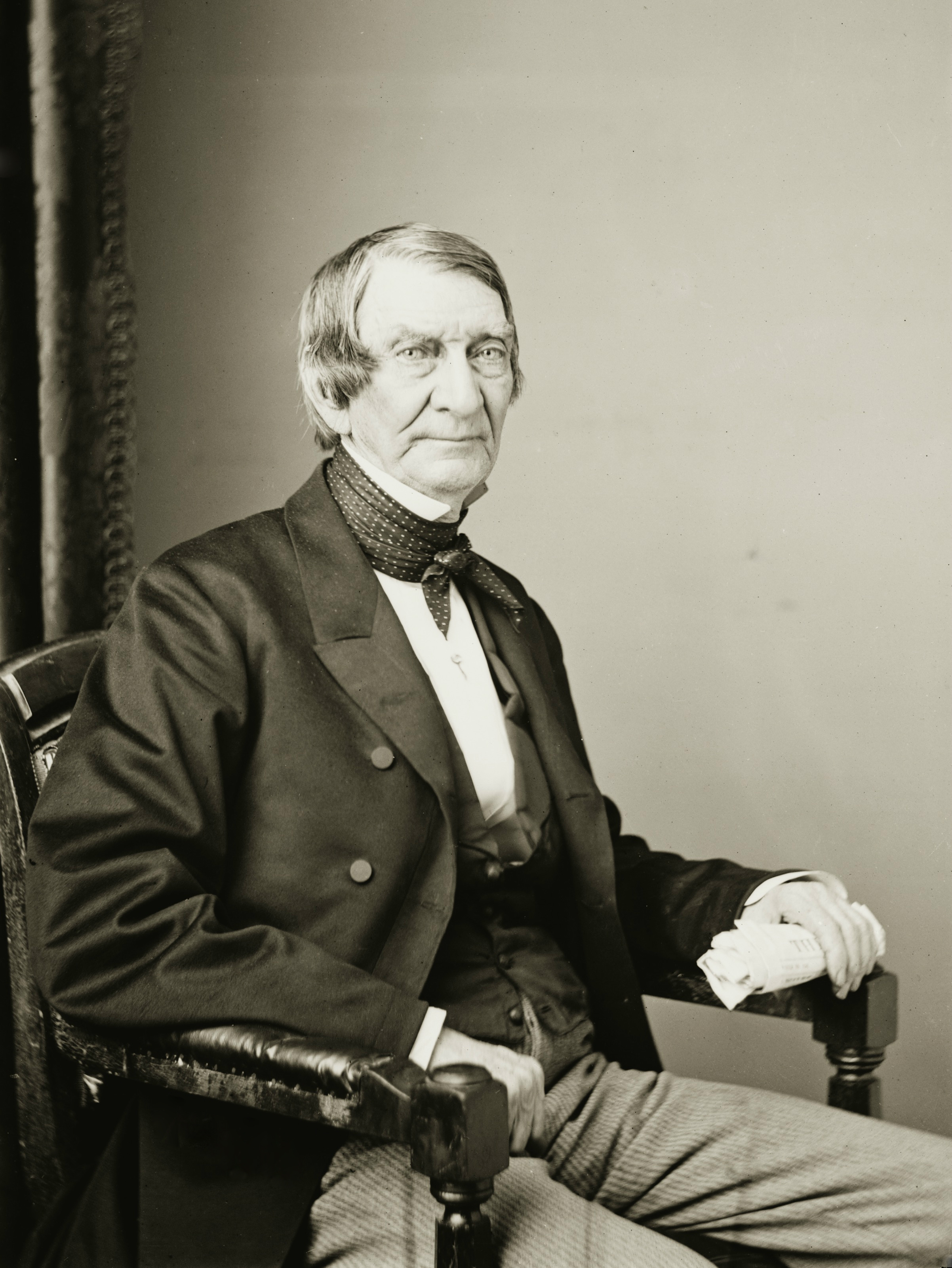
Candidate	Ezekiel F. Chambers	No votes
Party	National Republican
Legislative vote	53	20
Percentage	72.60%	27.40%

Ezekiel F. Chambers won election over non-voters by a margin of 45.21%, or 33 votes, for the Class 3 seat.

== New York ==
The Senate election in New York was held on February 1, 1831, by the New York State Legislature. Nathan Sanford had been elected in 1826 to this seat, and his term would expire on March 3, 1831. At the state election in November 1830, the Jacksonians managed to defeat the combined Anti-Masons and Anti-Jacksonians. Enos T. Throop was narrowly re-elected Governor, a large Jacksonian majority was elected to the Assembly, and five of the nine State Senators elected were Jacksonian Democrats. The 54th New York State Legislature met from January 4 to April 26, 1831, at Albany, New York. The Jacksonian State legislators held a caucus before the election, and n The Jacksonian State legislators held a caucus before the electionominated New York Supreme Court Justice William L. Marcy. The vote was 77 for Marcy, 15 for Erastus Root, 6 for the incumbent Nathan Sanford and 6 scattering votes. William L. Marcy was the choice of both the Assembly and the Senate, and was declared elected.

House	Jacksonian		Anti-Mason		Anti-Jacksonian	
State Senate (32 members)	William L. Marcy	20	Samuel Works	5		
State Assembly (128 members)	William L. Marcy	86	Samuel Works	27	Nathan Sanford	1

== Ohio ==
The two houses of the Ohio General Assembly met during the winter of 1830–1831 in joint assembly to elect a Senator (Class 3). After seven ballots, on various dates, Thomas Ewing was elected on a majority of the ballots. The balloting was as follows:

Ballot	Thomas Ewing (Anti-Jacksonian)	Micajah T. Williams (Jacksonian)	Edward King (Anti-Jacksonian)
1	33	49	21
2	37	50	21
3	42	49	16
4	46	52	9
5	51	51	5
6	54	53	2
7	✓ 54	51	2

== Pennsylvania ==
Pennsylvania had two election in this cycle.

=== Pennsylvania (regular) ===
-

=== Pennsylvania (special) ===
Following the December 6, 1831 resignation of Senator Isaac Barnard due to ill health, the Pennsylvania General Assembly convened on December 13, 1831, to elect a new Senator to fill the vacancy. Eleven ballots were recorded. The results of the eleventh and final ballot of both houses combined are as follows:

State Legislature Results
Party		Candidate	Votes	%	
	Democratic	George M. Dallas	67	50.38	
	Democratic	Joseph Hemphill	34	25.56%	
	Anti-Masonic	Richard Rush	30	22.56%	
	Democratic	Samuel B. Davis	1	0.75%	
	N/A	Not voting	1	0.75%	
-	Totals			133	100.00%

== See also ==
- 1830 United States elections
  - 1830–31 United States House of Representatives elections
- 21st United States Congress
- 22nd United States Congress

== Sources ==
- Party Division in the Senate, 1789-Present, via Senate.gov
