= 1828–29 United States Senate elections =

- Dates vary by state
- Class 2

16 of the 48 seats in the United States Senate (plus special elections) 25 seats needed for a majority
	Majority party	Minority party
Party	Jacksonian	Anti-Jacksonian
Last election	27 seats	19
Seats before	26	21
Seats won	10	6
Seats after	26	22
Seat change	Steady	▲1
Seats up	10	5
- Results: Jacksonian Hold Jacksonian Gain; Anti-Jacksonian Hold Anti-Jacksonian Gain
Majority Party before election
Jacksonian
Elected Majority Party
Jacksonian

The 1828–29 United States Senate elections were held on various dates in various states. As these United States Senate elections were prior to the ratification of the 17th Amendment to the United States Constitution in 1913, senators were chosen by State legislature United States. Senators were elected over a wide range of time throughout 1828 and 1829, and a seat may have been filled months late or remained vacant due to legislative deadlock. In these elections, terms were up for the senators in Class 2.

The Jacksonian coalition, despite its leader's victory in the presidential election, lost a seat in the Senate to the opposing Anti-Jacksonian coalition. Senators who called themselves "Anti-Jacksonian" or "National Republicans" were also called "Adams" or "Adams Men."

== Results summary ==
Senate party division at the beginning of the 21st United States Congress (1829–1831)

- Majority party: Jacksonian 26
- Minority party: Anti-Jackson 22
- Total seats: 48

== Change in composition ==
=== Before the elections ===
						A_{1}	A_{2}	A_{3}	A_{4}
A_{14}	A_{13}	A_{12}	A_{11}	A_{10}	A_{9}	A_{8}	A_{7}	A_{6}	A_{5}
A_{15}	A_{16}	A_{17} Mass. Ran	A_{18} N.H. Ran	A_{19} R.I. Ran	A_{20} La. Unknown	A_{21} Ill. Retired	J_{27} N.J. Resigned	J_{26} Maine; Retired	J_{25} Del. Retired
Majority →									J_{24} Miss. Unknown
J_{15}	J_{16}	J_{17} Ala. Ran	J_{18} Ky. Ran	J_{19} N.C. Ran	J_{20} S.C. Ran	J_{21} Tenn. Ran	J_{22} Va. Ran	J_{23} Ga. Unknown	J_{24} Miss. Unknown
J_{14}	J_{13}	J_{12}	J_{11}	J_{10}	J_{9}	J_{8}	J_{7}	J_{6}	J_{5}
						J_{1}	J_{2}	J_{3}	J_{4}

=== As a result of the elections ===
						A_{1}	A_{2}	A_{3}	A_{4}
A_{14}	A_{13}	A_{12}	A_{11}	A_{10}	A_{9}	A_{8}	A_{7}	A_{6}	A_{5}
A_{15}	A_{16}	A_{17} Mass. Re-elected	A_{18} N.H. Re-elected	A_{19} R.I. Re-elected	A_{20} Del. Gain	A_{21} Maine; Gain	A_{22} N.J. Gain	J_{26} La. Gain	J_{25} Ill. Gain
Majority →									J_{24} Miss. Hold
J_{15}	J_{16}	J_{17} Ala. Re-elected	J_{18} N.C. Re-elected	J_{19} S.C. Re-elected	J_{20} Tenn. Re-elected	J_{21} Va. Re-elected	J_{22} Ga. Hold	J_{23} Ky. Hold	J_{24} Miss. Hold
J_{14}	J_{13}	J_{12}	J_{11}	J_{10}	J_{9}	J_{8}	J_{7}	J_{6}	J_{5}
						J_{1}	J_{2}	J_{3}	J_{4}

Key:

A_{#}	= Anti-Jacksonian
J_{#}	= Jacksonian
V_{#}	= Vacant

== Race summaries ==
Bold states link to specific election articles.

=== Special elections during the 20th Congress ===
In these special elections, the winners were seated during 1828 or before March 4, 1829; ordered by election date.

State	Incumbent			Results	Candidates
State	Senator	Party	Electoral history	Results	Candidates
Georgia (Class 2)	Thomas W. Cobb	Jacksonian	1824 (special)	Incumbent resigned before November 7, 1828. New senator elected November 7, 1828. Jacksonian hold.	▌ ✓ Oliver H. Prince (Jacksonian); [data missing]
Ohio (Class 3)	William Henry Harrison	Anti-Jacksonian	1824	Incumbent resigned May 20, 1828 to become Minister Plenipotentiary to Gran Colombia. (Note: Now the United States Ambassador to Colombia.); New senator elected December 10, 1828. Anti-Jacksonian hold.	▌ ✓ Jacob Burnet (Anti-Jacksonian); [data missing]
North Carolina (Class 3)	Nathaniel Macon	Jacksonian	1815 (special); 1818; 1825	Incumbent resigned November 14, 1828. New senator elected December 15, 1828. Jacksonian hold.	▌ ✓ James Iredell Jr. (Jacksonian); [data missing]
Maine (Class 1)	Albion K. Parris	Jacksonian	1827	Incumbent resigned August 26, 1828 when appointed to the Maine Supreme Judicial Court. New senator elected January 15, 1829. Anti-Jacksonian gain.	▌ ✓ John Holmes (Anti-Jacksonian); [data missing]
New York (Class 1)	Martin Van Buren	Jacksonian	1821; 1827	Incumbent resigned December 20, 1828 to become Governor of New York. New senator elected January 15, 1829. Jacksonian hold.	▌ ✓ Charles E. Dudley (Jacksonian); [data missing]
New Jersey (Class 1)	Ephraim Bateman	Anti-Jacksonian	1826 (special); 1826	Incumbent resigned January 12, 1829 due to failing health. New senator elected January 30, 1829. Jacksonian gain.	▌ ✓ Mahlon Dickerson (Jacksonian) 28; ▌William B. Ewing (Unknown) 23; ▌Garret D. Wall (Jacksonian) 2

=== Races leading to the 21st Congress ===
In these regular elections, the winner was seated on March 4, 1829; ordered by state.

All of the elections involved the Class 2 seats.

State	Incumbent			Results	Candidates
State	Senator	Party	Electoral history	Results	Candidates
Alabama	William R. King	Jacksonian	1819; 1822	Incumbent re-elected in 1828.	▌ ✓ William R. King (Jacksonian); [data missing]
Delaware	Henry M. Ridgely	Jacksonian	1827 (special)	Incumbent retired. New senator elected in 1829. Anti-Jacksonian gain.	▌ ✓ John M. Clayton (Anti-Jacksonian); [data missing]
Georgia	Oliver H. Prince	Jacksonian	1828 (special)	Unknown if incumbent ran for re-election. New senator elected in 1828 or 1829. Jacksonian hold.	▌ ✓ George Troup (Jacksonian); [data missing]
Illinois	Jesse B. Thomas	Anti-Jacksonian	1818; 1823	Incumbent retired. New senator elected in 1828 or 1829. Jacksonian gain.	▌ ✓ John McLean (Jacksonian); [data missing]
Kentucky	Richard M. Johnson	Jacksonian	1819 (special); 1823	Incumbent lost re-election. New senator elected in 1829. Jacksonian hold.	▌ ✓ George M. Bibb (Jacksonian); [data missing]
Louisiana	Dominique Bouligny	Anti-Jacksonian	1824 (special)	Unknown if incumbent ran for re-election. New senator elected in 1829. Jacksonian gain.	▌ ✓ Edward Livingston (Jacksonian); [data missing]
Maine	John Chandler	Jacksonian	1820; 1823	Incumbent retired. New senator elected in 1828 or 1829. Anti-Jacksonian gain.	▌ ✓ Peleg Sprague (Anti-Jacksonian); [data missing]
Massachusetts	Nathaniel Silsbee	Anti-Jacksonian	1826 (special)	Incumbent re-elected in 1829.	▌ ✓ Nathaniel Silsbee (Anti-Jacksonian); [data missing]
Mississippi	Thomas Hill Williams	Jacksonian	1817; 1823	Unknown if incumbent ran for re-election. New senator elected in 1828. Jacksonian hold.	▌ ✓ Thomas Buck Reed (Jacksonian); [data missing]
New Hampshire	Samuel Bell	Anti-Jacksonian	1823	Incumbent re-elected in 1828 or 1829.	▌ ✓ Samuel Bell (Anti-Jacksonian); [data missing]
New Jersey	Mahlon Dickerson	Jacksonian	1817; 1823	Incumbent resigned January 30, 1829 when elected to the class 1 seat. New senator elected immediately thereafter on January 30, 1829. Anti-Jacksonian gain.	▌ ✓ Theodore Frelinghuysen (Anti-Jacksonian) 35; ▌Joseph W. Scott (Unknown) 21
North Carolina	John Branch	Jacksonian	1822	Incumbent re-elected in 1829.	▌ ✓ John Branch (Jacksonian); [data missing]
Rhode Island	Nehemiah R. Knight	Anti-Jacksonian	1821 (special); 1823	Incumbent re-elected October 31, 1828.	▌ ✓ Nehemiah R. Knight (Anti-Jacksonian); Unnanimously
South Carolina	Robert Y. Hayne	Jacksonian	1822	Incumbent re-elected in 1828.	▌ ✓ Robert Y. Hayne (Jacksonian); [data missing]
Tennessee	Hugh Lawson White	Jacksonian	1825 (special)	Incumbent re-elected in 1829.	▌ ✓ Hugh Lawson White (Jacksonian); [data missing]
Virginia	Littleton Tazewell	Jacksonian	1824 (special)	Incumbent re-elected in 1829.	▌ ✓ Littleton Tazewell (Jacksonian); [data missing]

=== Special elections during the 21st Congress ===
In these special elections, the winners were elected in 1829 after March 4; ordered by election date.

State	Incumbent			Results	Candidates
State	Senator	Party	Electoral history	Results	Candidates
Tennessee (Class 1)	John Eaton	Jacksonian	1818 (appointed); 1819 (special); 1821 (failure to elect); 1821 (special); 1826	Incumbent resigned March 9, 1829 to become U.S. Secretary of War. New senator elected October 19, 1829. Jacksonian hold.	▌ ✓ Felix Grundy (Jacksonian); [data missing]
Georgia (Class 3)	John M. Berrien	Jacksonian	1825	Incumbent resigned March 9, 1829 to become U.S. Attorney General. New senator elected November 9, 1829. Jacksonian hold.	▌ ✓ John Forsyth (Jacksonian); [data missing]
North Carolina (Class 2)	John Branch	Jacksonian	1822; 1828	Incumbent resigned March 9, 1829 to become U.S. Secretary of the Navy. New senator elected December 9, 1829. Jacksonian hold.	▌ ✓ Bedford Brown (Jacksonian); [data missing]

== Georgia ==
Georgia had three elections in this cycle.

=== Georgia (special, class 2) ===
John Raper Senator of Carroll County, Ga. murdered by George Blackwood

== Maine ==
Maine had two elections in this cycle.

== Massachusetts ==
Massachusetts had two elections in this cycle.

== New Jersey ==
New Jersey had two elections in this cycle.

== North Carolina ==
North Carolina had three elections in this cycle.

== Tennessee ==
Tennessee had two elections in this cycle.

== See also ==
- 1828 United States elections
  - 1828 United States presidential election
  - 1828–29 United States House of Representatives elections
- 20th United States Congress
- 21st United States Congress

== Sources ==
- Party Division in the Senate, 1789-Present, via Senate.gov
