= Willis Hargrave =

American politician

Member of the Illinois Senate
- In office 1818–1820
- Preceded by: Inaugural
- Succeeded by: Leonard White

Willis Hargrave was an American politician who served as a member of the Illinois Senate.

Hargrave was a member of the First Illinois Constitutional Convention in 1818. He served as a state senator representing White County in the 1st Illinois General Assembly.
