= 1826–27 United States Senate elections =

- Dates vary by state
- Class 1

16 of the 48 seats in the United States Senate (plus special elections) 25 seats needed for a majority
	Majority party	Minority party
Party	Jacksonian	Anti-Jacksonian
Last election	26 seats	21 seats
Seats before	26	22
Seats won	9	6
Seats after	27	20
Seat change	▲1	▼2
Seats up	8	8
- Results: Jacksonian hold Jacksonian gain Anti-Jacksonian hold Anti-Jacksonian gain Legislature failed to elect
Majority Party before election
Jacksonian
Elected Majority Party
Jacksonian

The 1826–27 United States Senate elections were held on various dates in various states. As these U.S. Senate elections were prior to the ratification of the Seventeenth Amendment in 1913, senators were chosen by state legislatures. Senators were elected over a wide range of time throughout 1826 and 1827, and a seat may have been filled months late or remained vacant due to legislative deadlock. In these elections, terms were up for the senators in Class 1.

The majority Jacksonians gained a seat in the United States Senate. Senators who called themselves "Anti-Jacksonian" or "National Republicans" were also called "Adams" or "Adams Men."

== Results summary ==
Senate party division, 20th Congress (1827–1829)

- Majority party: Jacksonian (27)
- Minority party: Anti-Jacksonian (20–21)
- Other parties: (0)
- Total seats: 48

== Change in composition ==
=== Before the elections ===
At the beginning of 1826.

						A_{1}	A_{2}	A_{3}	A_{4}
A_{14} Ind. Ran	A_{13}	A_{12}	A_{11}	A_{10}	A_{9}	A_{8}	A_{7}	A_{6}	A_{5}
A_{15} Mass. Ran	A_{16} Ohio; Ran	A_{17} R.I. Ran	A_{18} Vt. Ran	A_{19} Del. Unknown	A_{20} Maine; Unknown	A_{21} N.J. Died	V_{1}	J_{26} Pa. Retired	J_{25} Conn. Unknown
Majority →									J_{25} Conn. Unknown
J_{15}	J_{16}	J_{17}	J_{18}	J_{19} Md. Ran	J_{20} Miss. Ran	J_{21} Mo. Ran	J_{22} N.Y. Ran	J_{23} Tenn. Ran	J_{24} Va. Ran
J_{14}	J_{13}	J_{12}	J_{11}	J_{10}	J_{9}	J_{8}	J_{7}	J_{6}	J_{5}
						J_{1}	J_{2}	J_{3}	J_{4}

=== Result of the regular elections ===
						A_{1}	A_{2}	A_{3}	A_{4}
A_{14} Ind. Re-elected	A_{13}	A_{12}	A_{11}	A_{10}	A_{9}	A_{8}	A_{7}	A_{6}	A_{5}
A_{15} Ohio; Re-elected	A_{16} R.I. Re-elected	A_{17} Vt. Re-elected	A_{18} N.J. Hold	A_{19} Conn. Gain	V_{2} Mass. A Loss	V_{1}	J_{27} Maine; Gain	J_{26} Del. Gain	J_{25} Va. Hold
Majority →									J_{25} Va. Hold
J_{15}	J_{16}	J_{17}	J_{18}	J_{19} Md. Re-elected	J_{20} Mo. Re-elected	J_{21} N.Y. Re-elected	J_{22} Tenn. Re-elected	J_{23} Miss. Hold (Note: In Mississippi, Jacksonian appointee Powhatan Ellis lost the election to finish the term, but was elected to the next term.)	J_{24} Pa. Hold
J_{14}	J_{13}	J_{12}	J_{11}	J_{10}	J_{9}	J_{8}	J_{7}	J_{6}	J_{5}
						J_{1}	J_{2}	J_{3}	J_{4}

=== Result of the special elections ===
Before the March 4, 1827, beginning of the new Congress.

						A_{1}	A_{2}	A_{3}	A_{4}
A_{14}	A_{13}	A_{12}	A_{11}	A_{10}	A_{9}	A_{8}	A_{7}	A_{6}	A_{5}
A_{15}	A_{16}	A_{17} Md. Gain	A_{18} N.J. Hold, same as regular	A_{19} N.Y. Gain	A_{20} Mass. 2 Hold	V_{1}	J_{27} Del. (sp); Gain	J_{26} Miss. (sp); Elected (Note: Appointee elected)	J_{25} Ala. (sp); Hold
Majority →									J_{25} Ala. (sp); Hold
J_{15}	J_{16}	J_{17}	J_{18}	J_{19}	J_{20}	J_{21}	J_{22}	J_{23}	J_{24} S.C. Hold
J_{14}	J_{13}	J_{12}	J_{11}	J_{10}	J_{9}	J_{8}	J_{7}	J_{6}	J_{5}
						J_{1}	J_{2}	J_{3}	J_{4}

Key:

A_{#}	= Anti-Jacksonian
J_{#}	= Jacksonian
V_{#}	= Vacant

== Race summaries ==
=== Special elections during the 19th Congress ===
In these special elections, the winners were seated during 1826 or before March 4, 1827; ordered by election date.

State	Incumbent			Results	Candidates
State	Senator	Party	Electoral history	Results	Candidates
New York (Class 3)	Vacant			Seat vacant after an 1824 legislative deadlock. New senator elected January 14, 1826. Anti-Jacksonian gain.	▌ ✓ Nathan Sanford (Anti-Jacksonian); [data missing]
Maryland (Class 3)	Edward Lloyd	Jacksonian	1819; 1825	Incumbent resigned January 14, 1826. New senator elected January 24, 1826. Anti-Jacksonian gain.	▌ ✓ Ezekiel F. Chambers (Anti-Jacksonian); [data missing]
Mississippi (Class 1)	Powhatan Ellis	Jacksonian	1825 (appointed)	Interim appointee lost election January 28, 1826. Jacksonian hold.	▌ ✓ Thomas Reed (Jacksonian); [data missing]
Massachusetts (Class 2)	James Lloyd	Anti-Jacksonian	1808 (special); 1808; 1813 (resigned); 1822 (special); 1822	Incumbent resigned May 23, 1826. New senator elected May 31, 1826. Anti-Jacksonian hold.	▌ ✓ Nathaniel Silsbee (Anti-Jacksonian); [data missing]
New Jersey (Class 1)	Joseph McIlvaine	Anti-Jacksonian	1823 (special)	Incumbent died August 19, 1826; New senator elected November 10, 1826. Anti-Jacksonian hold. Winner also elected to the next term; see below.	▌ ✓ Ephraim Bateman (Anti-Jacksonian); [data missing]
Alabama (Class 3)	Israel Pickens	Jacksonian	1826 (appointed)	Interim appointee not elected to finish the term. New senator elected November 27, 1826. Jacksonian hold.	▌ ✓ John McKinley (Jacksonian); [data missing]
South Carolina (Class 3)	William Harper	Jacksonian	1826 (appointed)	Interim appointee not elected to finish the term. New senator elected November 29, 1826. Jacksonian hold.	▌ ✓ William Smith (Jacksonian); [data missing]
Delaware (Class 2)	Daniel Rodney	Anti-Jacksonian	1826 (appointed)	Interim appointee not elected to finish the term. New senator elected January 12, 1827. Jacksonian gain.	▌ ✓ Henry M. Ridgely (Jacksonian); [data missing]

=== Races leading to the 20th Congress ===
In these regular elections, the winner was seated on March 4, 1827; ordered by state.

All of the elections involved the Class 1 seats.

State	Incumbent			Results	Candidates
State	Senator	Party	Electoral history	Results	Candidates
Connecticut	Henry W. Edwards	Jacksonian	1823 (appointed); 1824 (special)	Incumbent retired or lost re-election. New senator elected. Anti-Jacksonian gain.	▌ ✓ Samuel A. Foote (Anti-Jacksonian); [data missing]
Delaware	Thomas Clayton	Anti-Jacksonian	1824 (special)	Incumbent retired or lost re-election. New senator elected. Jacksonian gain.	▌ ✓ Louis McLane (Jacksonian); [data missing]
Indiana	James Noble	Anti-Jacksonian	1816; 1821	Incumbent re-elected.	▌ ✓ James Noble (Anti-Jacksonian); [data missing]
Maine	John Holmes	Anti-Jacksonian	1820; 1821	Incumbent retired or lost re-election. New senator elected. Jacksonian gain.	▌ ✓ Albion K. Parris (Jacksonian); [data missing]
Maryland	Samuel Smith	Jacksonian	1802; 1809; 1815 (lost); 1822 (special)	Incumbent re-elected.	▌ ✓ Samuel Smith (Jacksonian); [data missing]
Massachusetts	Elijah H. Mills	Anti-Jacksonian	1820 (special); 1820	Incumbent lost re-election. Legislature elected late. Anti-Jacksonian loss.	[data missing]
Mississippi	Thomas Reed	Jacksonian	1826 (special)	Incumbent lost re-election. New senator elected in 1826 or 1827. Jacksonian hold.	▌ ✓ Powhatan Ellis (Jacksonian); [data missing]
Missouri	Thomas H. Benton	Jacksonian	1821	Incumbent re-elected.	▌ ✓ Thomas H. Benton (Jacksonian); [data missing]
New Jersey	Joseph McIlvaine	Anti-Jacksonian	1823 (special)	Incumbent died August 19, 1826. New senator elected November 10, 1826. Anti-Jacksonian hold. Winner was also elected to finish the preceding term; see above.	▌ ✓ Ephraim Bateman (Anti-Jacksonian); [data missing]
New York	Martin Van Buren	Jacksonian	1821	Incumbent re-elected February 6, 1827.	▌ ✓ Martin Van Buren (Jacksonian); [data missing]
Ohio	Benjamin Ruggles	Anti-Jacksonian	1815; 1821	Incumbent re-elected.	▌ ✓ Benjamin Ruggles (Anti-Jacksonian); Unopposed
Pennsylvania	William Findlay	Jacksonian	1821	Incumbent retired. New senator elected. Jacksonian hold.	▌ ✓ Isaac D. Barnard (Jacksonian) 81.20%; ▌Samuel D. Ingham (Jacksonian) 8.27%; ▌Joseph Hemphill (Jacksonian) 3.76%; ▌James Buchanan (Jacksonian) 2.26%; ▌Thomas Sergeant (Jacksonian) 0.75%; Not voting 3.76%
Rhode Island	Asher Robbins	Anti-Jacksonian	1825 (special)	Incumbent re-elected November 2, 1826.	▌ ✓ Asher Robbins (Anti-Jacksonian) unanimously
Tennessee	John Eaton	Jacksonian	1818 (appointed); 1819 (special); 1821 (special)	Incumbent re-elected.	▌ ✓ John Eaton (Jacksonian); [data missing]
Vermont	Horatio Seymour	Anti-Jacksonian	1821	Incumbent re-elected.	▌ ✓ Horatio Seymour (Anti-Jacksonian); [data missing]
Virginia	John Randolph	Jacksonian	1825 (Appointed)	Appointee lost election. New senator elected. Jacksonian hold.	▌ ✓ John Tyler (Jacksonian); [data missing]

=== Elections during the 20th Congress ===
In this election, the winner was seated in 1827 after the new Congress began on March 4.

State	Incumbent			Results	Candidates
State	Senator	Party	Electoral history	Results	Candidates
Massachusetts (Class 1)	Vacant			Vacant due to late election. New senator elected June 8, 1827. Anti-Jacksonian gain.	▌ ✓ Daniel Webster (Anti-Jacksonian) 202; Others 126

== Delaware ==
Delaware had two elections: a special for the class 2 seat and a regular election for the class 1 seat. The elections flipped both seats from Anti-Jacksonian to Jacksonian.

=== Delaware (special) ===
Anti-Jacksonian senator Nicholas Van Dyke died on May 21, 1826, and Anti-Jacksonian Daniel Rodney was appointed to continue the class 2 term (ending March 3, 1829) until a special election.

Jacksonian Henry M. Ridgely was elected on January 12, 1827.

=== Delaware (regular) ===
Anti-Jacksonian Thomas Clayton had served since winning an 1824 special election. It is unknown if Clayton was a candidate for re-election in 1827, but that election was won by Jacksonian Louis McLane.

== Maryland ==
=== Maryland (special) ===
1826 United States Senate special election in Maryland
- January 24, 1826

80 members of the Maryland General Assembly
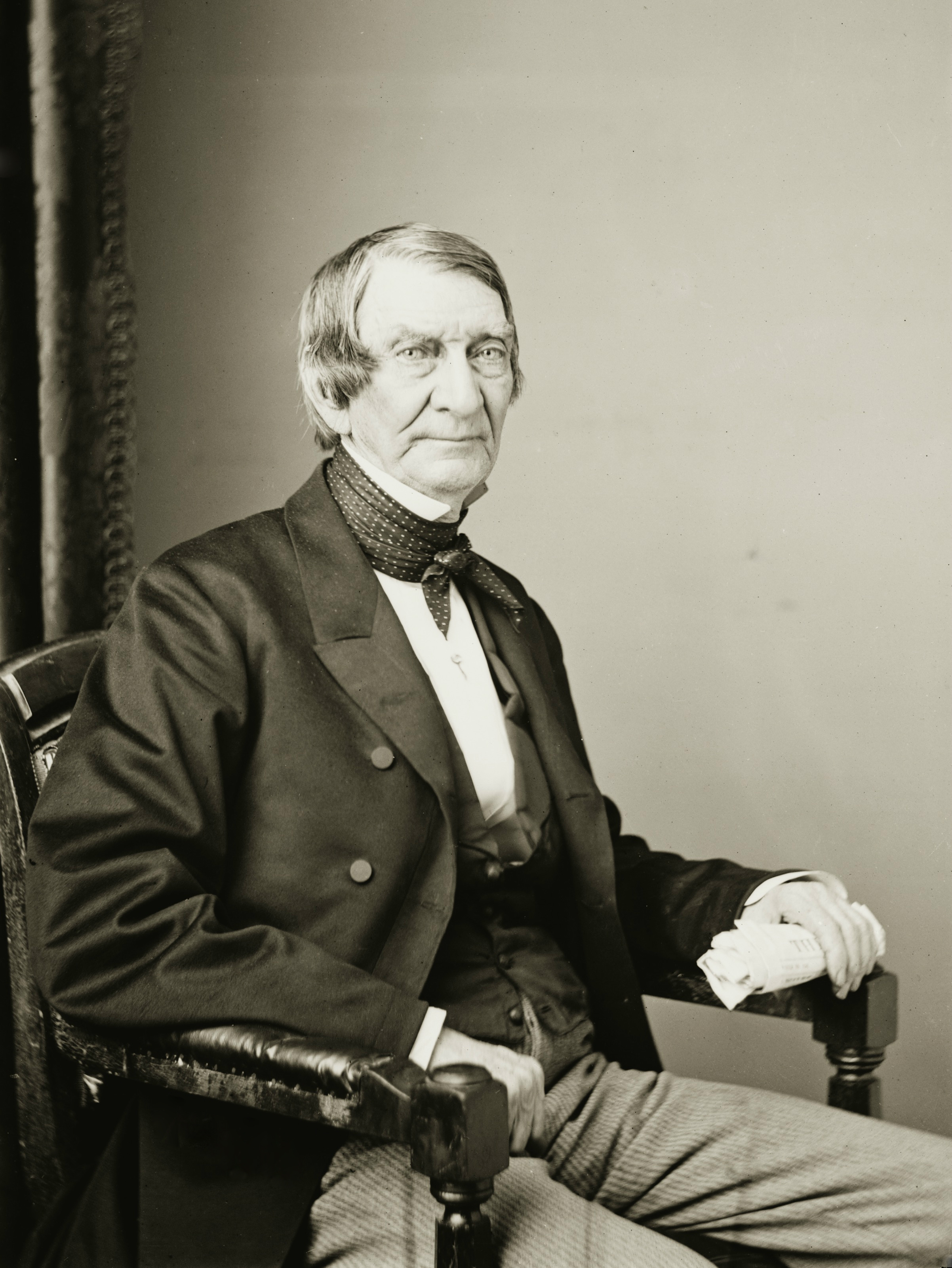

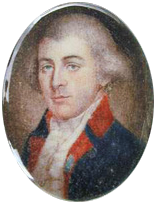
Candidate	Ezekiel F. Chambers	Philip Reed
Party	National Republican	Democratic-Republican
Legislative vote	49	34
Percentage	59.04%	40.96%

Ezekiel F. Chambers won election over Philip Reed by a margin of 18.07%, or 15 votes, for the Class 3 seat.

=== Maryland (regular) ===
1827 United States Senate election in Maryland
- January 9, 1827

80 members of the Maryland General Assembly
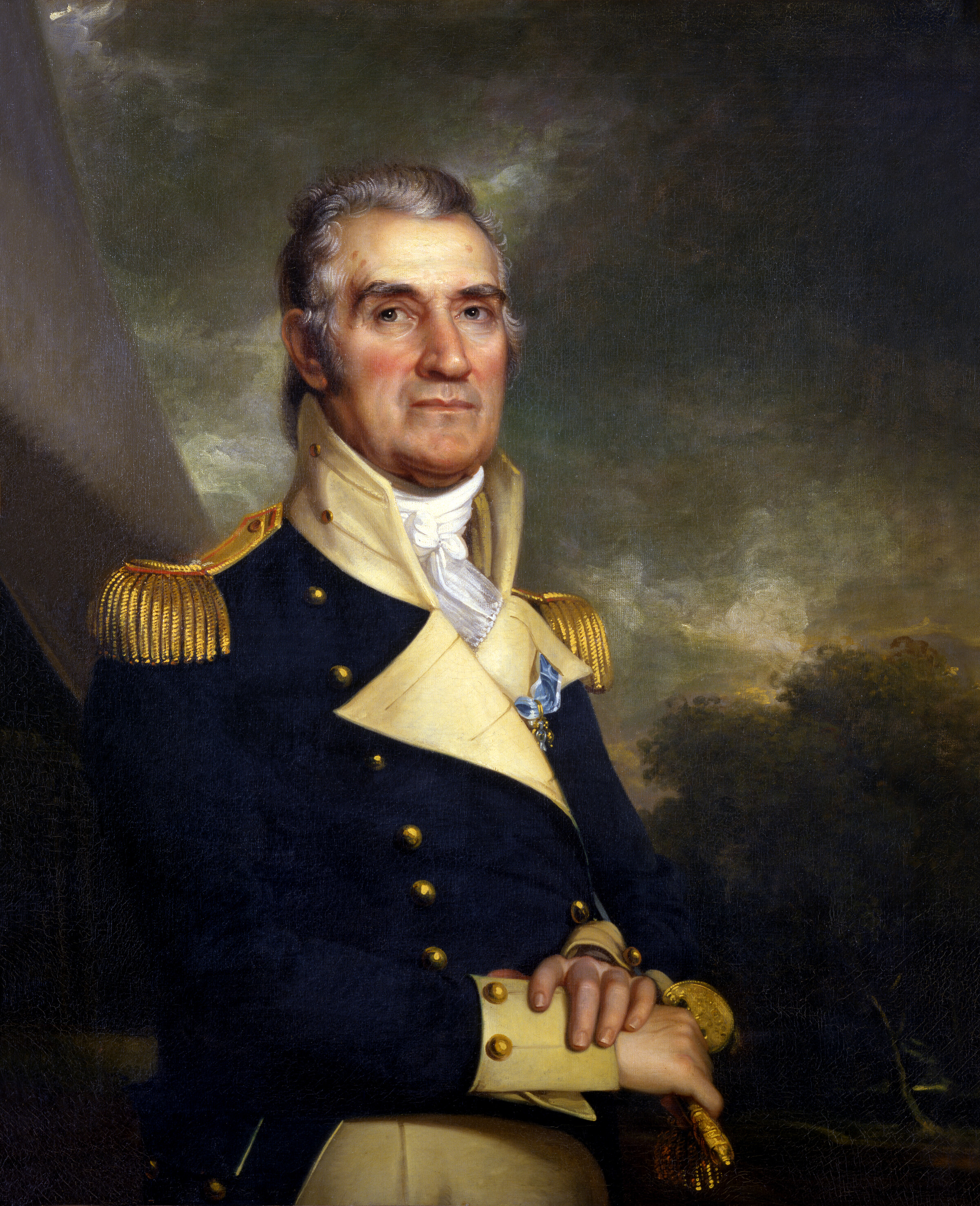
Candidate	Samuel Smith	Did not vote
Party	Jacksonian democracy
Legislative vote	78	5
Percentage	93.98%	6.02

Samuel Smith won election by a margin of 87.95%, or 73 votes, for the Class 1 seat.

== Mississippi ==
Jacksonian interim appointee Powhatan Ellis had served in the class 1 seat since 1825 for the term ending March 3, 1827.

He faced a special election to finish the term and a regular election to the next term.

=== Mississippi (special) ===
Jacksonian Thomas Buck Reed was elected January 27, 1826, to finish the term, but not to the next full term.

=== Mississippi (regular) ===
Jacksonian interim appointee Powhatan Ellis was elected sometime (date unknown) to the next term, and would go on to serve until 1832.

== See also ==
- 1826 United States elections
  - 1826–27 United States House of Representatives elections
- 19th United States Congress
- 20th United States Congress
