= 1835 United States Senate elections in Michigan =

The new state of Michigan elected its first senators in 1835. The Michigan Legislature chose Lucius Lyon and John Norvell. Lyon was elected unanimously by both houses, Norvell received 35 votes and John Biddle received 28 votes. Lyon and Norvell were not seated or sworn in until January 26, 1837, when Michigan was admitted into the Union. In the term beginning March 4, 1837, they would sit as Democrats.

== See also ==
- List of United States senators from Michigan
- 1834 and 1835 United States Senate elections
