= Leonard White (Illinois politician) =

American politician

Member of the Illinois Senate
- In office 1820–1824
- Preceded by: Willis Hargrave

Leonard White was an American politician who served as a member of the Illinois Senate. He served as a state senator representing White County in the 2nd and 3rd Illinois General Assemblies.
