= 1822–23 United States Senate elections =

- Dates vary by state
- Class 2

16 of the 48 seats in the United States Senate (plus special elections) 25 seats needed for a majority
	Majority party	Minority party
Party	Democratic-Republican	Federalist
Last election	39 seats	4 seats
Seats before	44	4
Seats won	14	1
Seats after	44	3
Seat change	Steady	▼1
Seats up	14	2
- Results: Federalist hold Dem-Republican hold Legislature Failed To Elect
Majority Party before election
Democratic-Republican
Elected Majority Party
Democratic-Republican

The 1822–23 United States Senate elections were held on various dates in various states. As these U.S. Senate elections were before the ratification of the Seventeenth Amendment in 1913, senators were chosen by state legislatures. Senators were elected over a wide range of time throughout 1822 and 1823, and a seat may have been filled months late or remained vacant due to legislative deadlock. In these elections, terms were up for the senators in Class 2.

The Democratic-Republican Party continued to maintain almost complete control of the Senate.

== Factions ==
At the very end of the next Congress, the 1824 United States presidential election led to a contingency election, decided by the Congress. In that election, Senators split into factions in support of William H. Crawford, Andrew Jackson, or John Quincy Adams and Henry Clay. Even though that election wasn't held until more than two years after the Senate elections in this article, those factions are noted below as "Crawford," "Jackson," or "Adams-Clay."

== Results summary ==
Senate party division, 18th Congress (1823–1825)

- Majority party: Democratic-Republican (42–43)
- Minority parties: National Republican & Federalist (4–5)
- Total seats: 48

== Change in composition ==
=== Before the elections ===
Composition after the January 24, 1822 Delaware special election.

						DR_{1} Del. Gain	DR_{2}	DR_{3}	DR_{4}
DR_{14}	DR_{13}	DR_{12}	DR_{11}	DR_{10}	DR_{9}	DR_{8}	DR_{7}	DR_{6}	DR_{5}
DR_{15}	DR_{16}	DR_{17}	DR_{18}	DR_{19}	DR_{20}	DR_{21}	DR_{22}	DR_{23}	DR_{24}
Majority →									DR_{25}
DR_{34} Ky. Ran	DR_{33} Ill. Ran	DR_{32} Ga. Ran	DR_{31} Ala. Ran	DR_{30}	DR_{29}	DR_{28}	DR_{27}	DR_{26}	DR_{25}
DR_{35} La. Ran	DR_{36} Me. Ran	DR_{37} Miss. Ran	DR_{38} N.J. Ran	DR_{39} N.C. Ran	DR_{40} R.I. Ran	DR_{41} S.C. Ran	DR_{42} Tenn. Ran	DR_{43} Va. Ran	DR_{44} N.H. Retired
						F_{1}	F_{2}	F_{3} Mass. Ran	F_{4} Del.

=== Result of the regular elections ===
						DR_{1}	DR_{2}	DR_{3}	DR_{4}
DR_{14}	DR_{13}	DR_{12}	DR_{11}	DR_{10}	DR_{9}	DR_{8}	DR_{7}	DR_{6}	DR_{5}
DR_{15}	DR_{16}	DR_{17}	DR_{18}	DR_{19}	DR_{20}	DR_{21}	DR_{22}	DR_{23}	DR_{24}
Majority →									DR_{25}
DR_{34} Ky. Re-elected	DR_{33} Ill. Re-elected	DR_{32} Ga. Re-elected	DR_{31} Ala. Re-elected	DR_{30}	DR_{29}	DR_{28}	DR_{27}	DR_{26}	DR_{25}
DR_{35} La. Re-elected	DR_{36} Me. Re-elected	DR_{37} Miss. Re-elected	DR_{38} N.J. Re-elected	DR_{39} R.I. Re-elected	DR_{40} Va. Re-elected	DR_{41} N.H. Hold	DR_{42} N.C. Hold	DR_{43} S.C. Hold	DR_{44} Tenn. Hold
						F_{1}	F_{2}	F_{3} Mass. Re-elected	V_{1} Del. F Loss

Key:

DR_{#}	Democratic-Republican
F_{#}	Federalist
V_{#}	Vacant

== Race summaries ==
Bold states links to specific election articles.

=== Special elections during the preceding Congress ===
In these special elections, the winners were seated during 1822 or before March 4, 1823; ordered by election date.

State	Incumbent			Results	Candidates
State	Senator	Party	Electoral history	Results	Candidates
Delaware (Class 1)	Vacant			Outerbridge Horsey (F) resigned March 3, 1821. New senator elected January 24, 1822. Democratic-Republican gain.	▌ ✓ Caesar A. Rodney (Democratic-Republican); [data missing]
Ohio (Class 3)	William A. Trimble	Democratic- Republican	1819	Incumbent died December 13, 1821. New senator elected January 29, 1822. Democratic-Republican hold.	▌ ✓ Ethan Allen Brown (Democratic-Republican); [data missing]
Massachusetts (Class 2)	Harrison Gray Otis	Federalist	1816	Incumbent resigned May 30, 1822, to run for Mayor of Boston. New senator elected June 5, 1822. Successor was also elected to the next term; see below. Federalist hold.	▌ ✓ James Lloyd (Federalist); [data missing]
Alabama (Class 3)	John W. Walker	Democratic- Republican	1819	Incumbent resigned December 12, 1822, due to failing health. New senator elected December 12, 1822. Democratic-Republican hold.	▌ ✓ William Kelly (Democratic-Republican) 56.65%; ▌John McKinley (Democratic-Republican) 49.35%
Maryland (Class 1)	William Pinkney	Democratic- Republican	1819 (special); 1821	Incumbent died February 25, 1822. New senator elected December 17, 1822. Democratic-Republican hold.	▌ ✓ Samuel Smith (Democratic-Republican); [data missing]
Virginia (Class 2)	James Pleasants	Democratic- Republican	1819 (special)	Incumbent resigned December 15, 1822, to become Governor of Virginia. New senator elected December 18, 1822. Winner was later re-elected to the next term; see below. Democratic-Republican hold.	▌ ✓ John Taylor (Democratic-Republican) 51.8%; ▌Henry St. George Tucker Sr. (Democratic-Republican) 37.9%; ▌John Tyler (Democratic-Republican) 10.3%

=== Races leading to the next Congress ===
In these regular elections, the winner was seated on March 4, 1823; as ordered by the state.

All of the elections involved the Class 2 seats.

State	Incumbent			Results	Candidates
State	Senator	Party	Electoral history	Results	Candidates
Alabama	William R. King	Democratic- Republican	1819	Incumbent re-elected December 12, 1822.	▌ ✓ William R. King (Jackson D-R) 41.76%; ▌William Crawford (Unknown) 38.46%; ▌John McKee (Jackson D-R) 13.19%; ▌William King (Jackson D-R) 6.59%
Delaware	Nicholas Van Dyke	Federalist	1817	Legislature failed to elect. Federalist loss. Incumbent was later re-elected late in 1824.	[data missing]
Georgia	Nicholas Ware	Democratic- Republican	1821 (special)	Incumbent re-elected in 1822 or 1823.	▌ ✓ Nicholas Ware (Crawford D-R); [data missing]
Illinois	Jesse B. Thomas	Democratic- Republican	1818	Incumbent re-elected in 1823.	▌ ✓ Jesse B. Thomas (Crawford D-R); [data missing]
Kentucky	Richard M. Johnson	Democratic- Republican	1819 (special)	Incumbent re-elected in 1823.	▌ ✓ Richard M. Johnson (Jackson D-R); [data missing]
Louisiana	Henry Johnson	Democratic- Republican	1818 (special)	Incumbent re-elected in 1823.	▌ ✓ Henry Johnson (Adams-Clay D-R); [data missing]
Maine	John Chandler	Democratic- Republican	1820	Incumbent re-elected in 1823.	▌ ✓ John Chandler (Crawford D-R); [data missing]
Massachusetts	James Lloyd	Federalist	1808 (special); 1808; 1813 (resigned); 1822 (special)	Incumbent re-elected as an Adams-Clay Federalist in 1822. Winner was also elected to finish the current term; see above.	▌ ✓ James Lloyd (Adams-Clay Federalist); [data missing]
Mississippi	Thomas Hill Williams	Democratic- Republican	1817	Incumbent re-elected in 1823.	▌ ✓ Thomas Hill Williams (Jackson D-R); [data missing]
New Hampshire	David L. Morril	Democratic- Republican	1816	Incumbent retired. New senator elected in 1823. Democratic-Republican hold.	▌ ✓ Samuel Bell (Adams-Clay D-R); [data missing]
New Jersey	Mahlon Dickerson	Democratic- Republican	1817	Incumbent re-elected November 14, 1822.	▌ ✓ Mahlon Dickerson (Crawford D-R); unopposed
North Carolina	Montfort Stokes	Democratic- Republican	1816 (special); 1816	Incumbent lost re-election. New senator elected in 1822. Democratic-Republican hold.	▌ ✓ John Branch (Crawford D-R); [data missing]
Rhode Island	Nehemiah R. Knight	Democratic- Republican	1821 (special)	Incumbent re-elected in 1823.	▌ ✓ Nehemiah R. Knight (Crawford D-R); [data missing]
South Carolina	William Smith	Democratic- Republican	1810 (special); 1816	Incumbent lost re-election. New senator elected in 1822. Democratic-Republican hold.	▌ ✓ Robert Y. Hayne (Jackson D-R); [data missing]
Tennessee	John Williams	Democratic- Republican	1815 (special)	Incumbent lost re-election. New senator elected October 28, 1823. Democratic-Republican hold.	▌ ✓ Andrew Jackson (Jackson D-R) 58.33%; ▌John Williams (Crawford D-R) 41.67%
Virginia	John Taylor	Democratic- Republican	1822 (special)	Incumbent re-elected in 1823. Winner was also elected to finish the current term; see above.	▌ ✓ John Taylor (Democratic-Republican); [data missing]

=== Special elections during the next Congress ===
In these special elections, the winners were elected in 1823 after March 4; ordered by election date.

State	Incumbent			Results	Candidates
State	Senator	Party	Electoral history	Results	Candidates
New Jersey (Class 1)	Samuel L. Southard	Democratic- Republican	1821 (appointed); 1820	Incumbent resigned March 4, 1823, to become U.S. Secretary of the Navy. New senator elected November 12, 1823. Democratic Republican hold.	▌ ✓ Joseph McIlvaine (Adams-Clay D-R); unopposed

== Alabama ==
=== Alabama (regular) ===
Incumbent William R. King was first elected in 1819. He was reelected with the votes of over 41% of the legislators, defeating William Crawford, former agent to the Choctaw nation John McKee, and another candidate named William King.

1822 United States Senate election in Alabama
- December 12, 1822
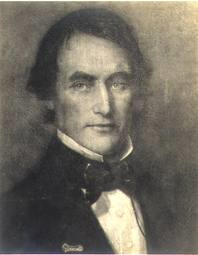

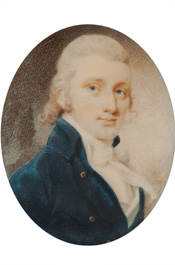
Candidate	William R. King	William Crawford
Party	Democratic-Republican	Independent
Percentage	41.76%	38.46%
Candidate	John McKee	William King
Party	Democratic-Republican	Democratic-Republican
Percentage	13.19%	6.59%

=== Alabama (special) ===
Incumbent John Williams Walker resigned on December 12, 1822, due to failing health. He would die in April of the following year. William Kelly was elected in his place with 56.65% of the votes of state legislators, defeating state representative John McKinley.

1822 United States Senate special election in Alabama
- December 12, 1822
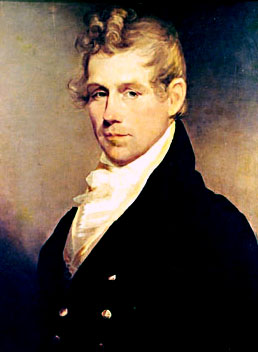
Candidate	William Kelly	John McKinley
Party	Democratic-Republican	Democratic-Republican
Percentage	56.65%	49.35%

== Delaware ==
=== Delaware (regular) ===
The Delaware General Assembly did not elect a candidate to the United States Senate.

=== Delaware (special) ===
Federalist incumbent Outerbridge Horsey retired in the 1820/1821 Senate elections. The Delaware General Assembly failed to elect a successor. Caesar Augustus Rodney, the U.S. representative for Delaware's at-large congressional district and a nephew of founding father Caesar Rodney, was elected late.

== Georgia ==
Incumbent Democratic-Republican Nicholas Ware was reelected in 1823.

== Illinois ==
Incumbent Democratic-Republican Jesse B. Thomas was reelected in 1823.

== Kentucky ==
Incumbent Democratic-Republican Richard Mentor Johnson was reelected in 1823.

== Louisiana ==
Incumbent Democratic-Republican Henry S. Johnson was reelected in 1823

== Maine ==
Incumbent Democratic-Republican John Chandler was reelected in 1823.

== Maryland (special) ==
1822 United States Senate special election in Maryland
- December 11, 1822

80 members of the Maryland General Assembly
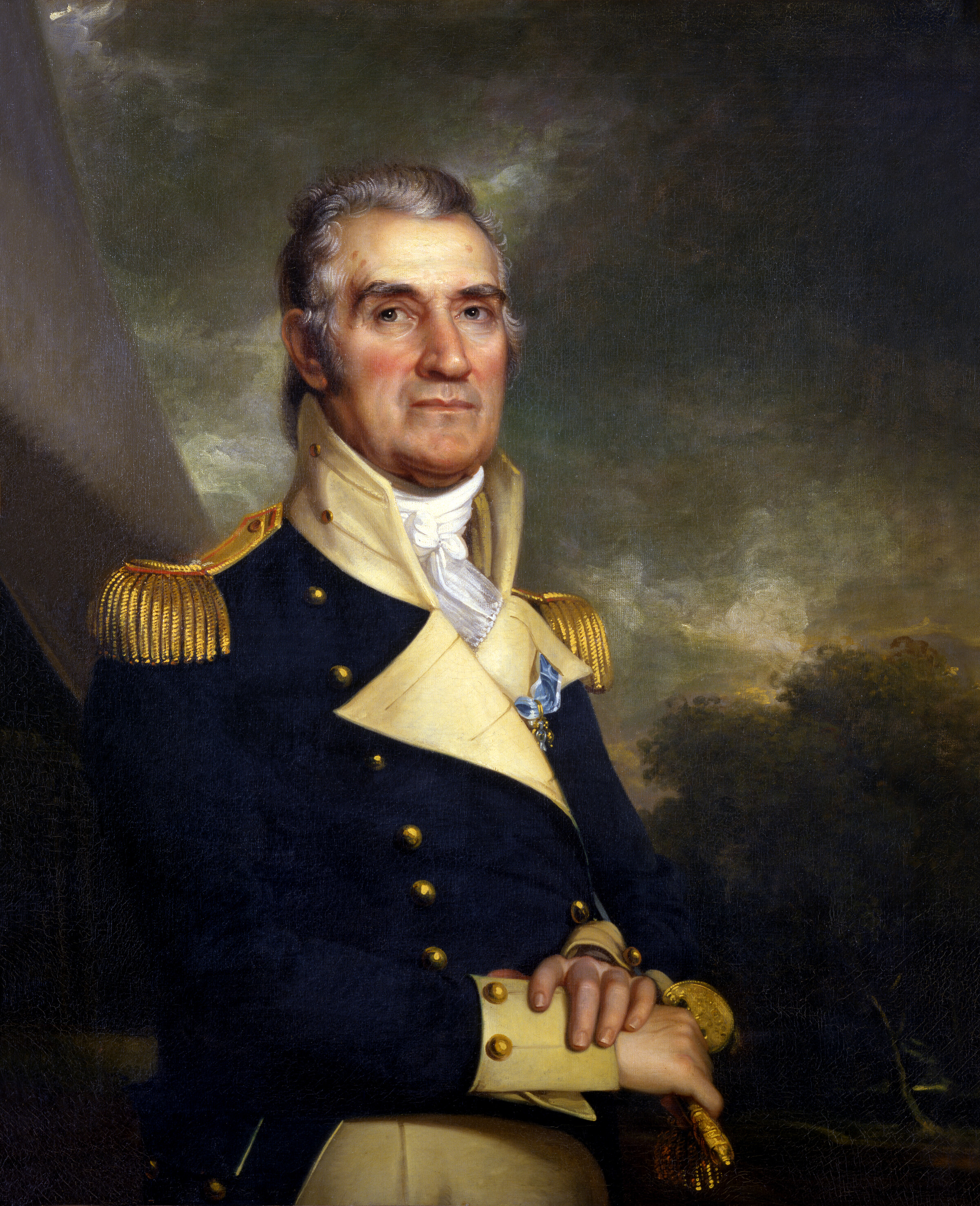
Candidate	Samuel Smith
Party	Democratic-Republican
Legislative vote	-
Percentage	-%

Incumbent Democratic-Republican William Pinkney died on February 25, 1822. Congressman Samuel Smith, a Democratic-Republican, was elected to the seat on December 17, 1822.

== Massachusetts ==
=== Massachusetts (regular) ===
Incumbent Federalist James Lloyd was reelected in 1822 after being first elected in a special election (see below).

=== Massachusetts (special) ===
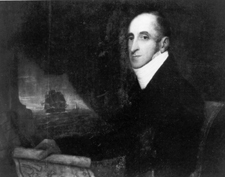
James Lloyd

Incumbent Senator Harrison Gray Otis resigned on May 30, 1822, to run for Mayor of Boston. Former senator James Lloyd, a Federalist was elected on June 5, 1822.

== Mississippi ==
Incumbent Democratic-Republican Thomas Hill Williams was reelected in 1823.

== New Hampshire ==
Incumbent Democratic-Republican David L. Morril retired. Governor of New Hampshire Samuel Bell was elected as a Democratic-Republican.

== New Jersey ==
=== New Jersey (regular) ===
Incumbent Democratic-Republican Mahlon Dickerson was reelected in November 1822.

=== New Jersey (special) ===
Incumbent Democratic-Republican Samuel L. Southard resigned on March 3, 1823, to become the U.S. Secretary of the Navy. Democratic-Republican Joseph McIlvaine was elected to finish his term on November 12, 1823.

== North Carolina ==
Incumbent Democratic-Republican Montfort Stokes was defeated for reelection by John Branch, a fellow Democratic-Republican, in 1822.

== Ohio (special) ==
Incumbent Jeffersonian Republican William A. Trimble died on December 13, 1821, at the age of 35. Governor of Ohio, Ethan Allen Brown, was elected to finish Trimble's term.

== Rhode Island ==
Incumbent Democratic-Republican Nehemiah R. Knight was reelected in 1823.

== South Carolina ==
Incumbent Democratic-Republican William Smith lost reelection to Democratic-Republican Robert Y. Hayne.

== Tennessee ==
Former senator and general Andrew Jackson defeated incumbent John Williams in the election for Senate. Jackson was put up as the Jacksonian candidate after Williams decided to support William H. Crawford in the 1824 Presidential Election. Williams was endorsed by Davy Crockett. Jackson's return to the senate after nearly 25 years out of office marks the second longest gap in service in U.S. Senate history. Jackson would resign two years later in 1825, and eventually be elected president in 1828.

1823 United States Senate election in Tennessee
- November 28, 1823

60 legislators 31 votes needed to win
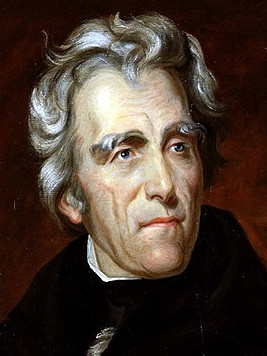

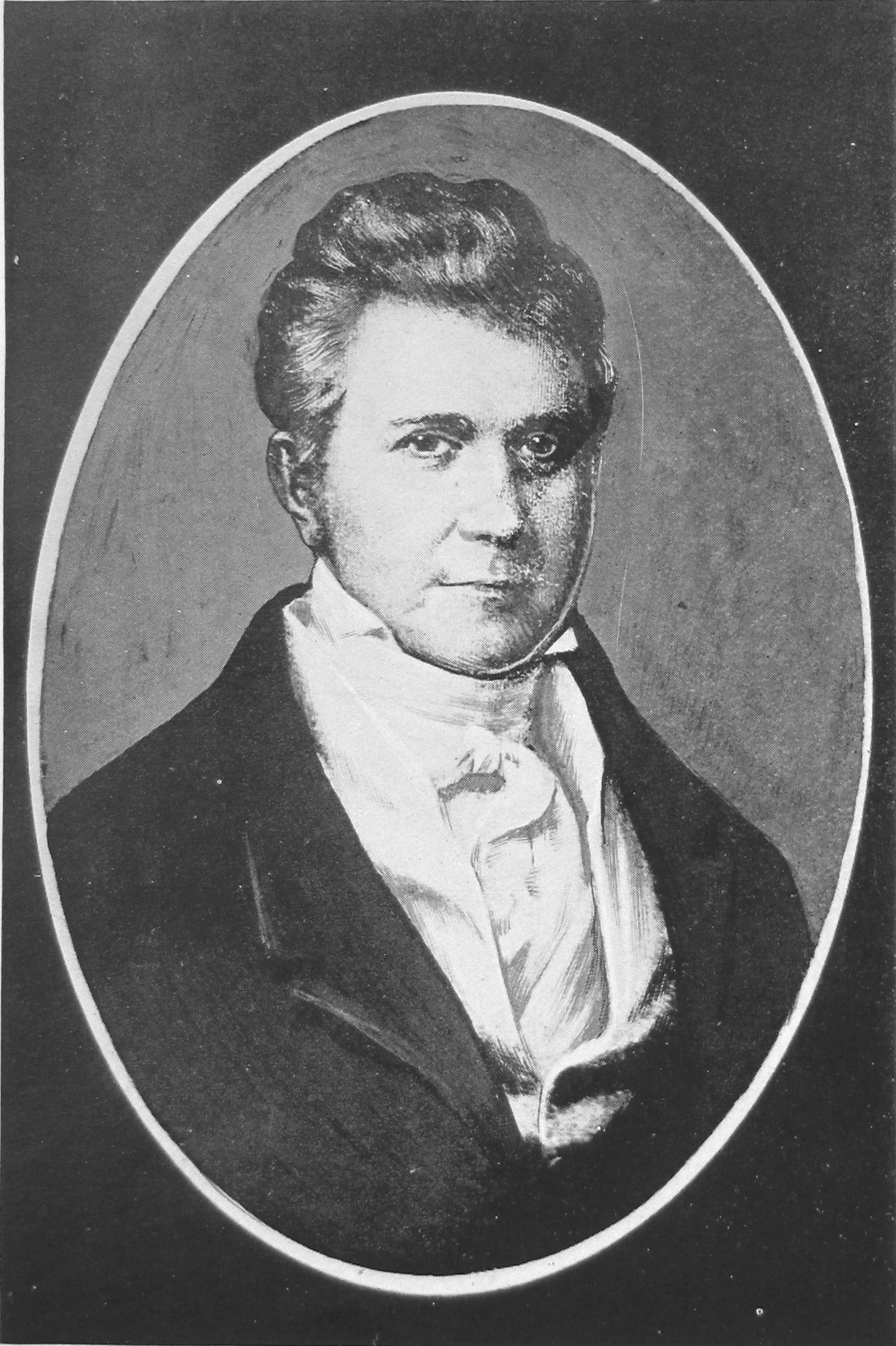
Candidate	Andrew Jackson	John Williams
Party	Democratic-Republican	Democratic-Republican
Alliance	Jacksonian	Old Republican
Legislative vote	35	25
Percentage	58.33%	41.67%

== Virginia ==
=== Virginia (regular) ===
After being elected in the special election (see below), incumbent John Taylor was reelected in 1823.

=== Virginia (special) ===
Incumbent James Pleasants resigned on December 15, 1822, to become Governor of Virginia. Former senator John Taylor, a Democratic-Republican, was elected with 51.8% of the votes of legislators over former congressmen Henry St. George Tucker and John Tyler, both Democratic-Republicans.

1822 United States Senate special election in Virginia
- December 18, 1822
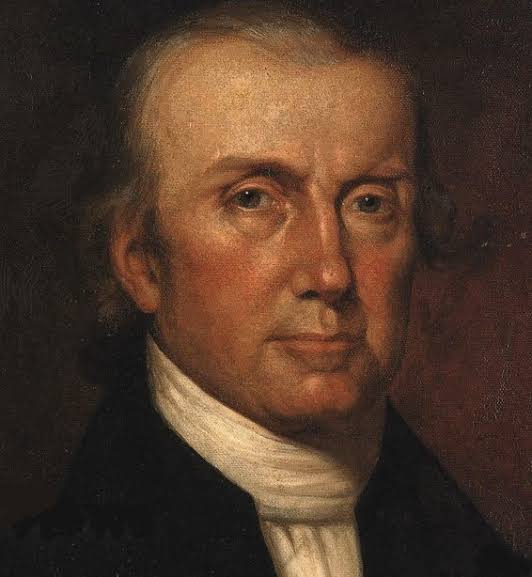

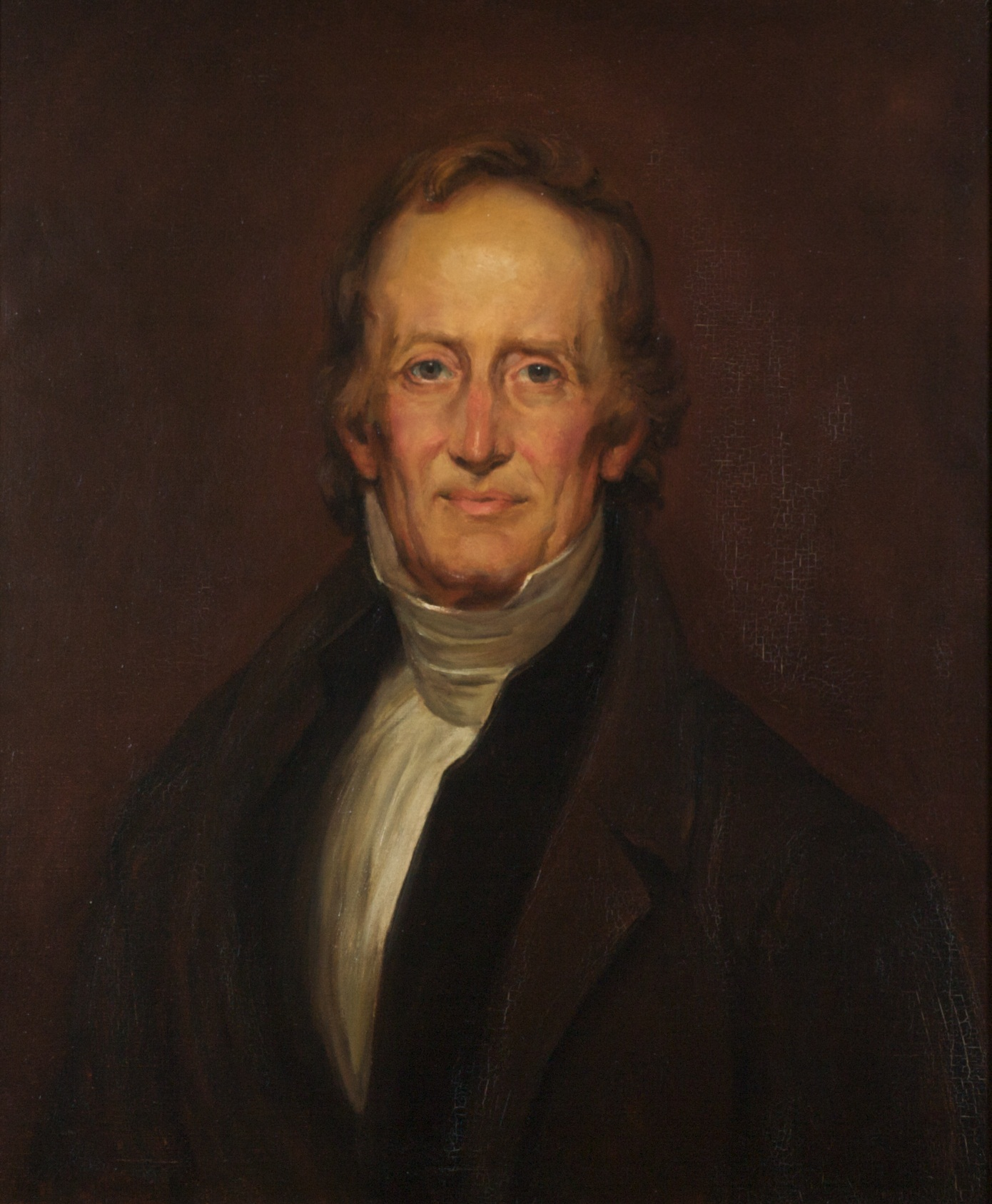

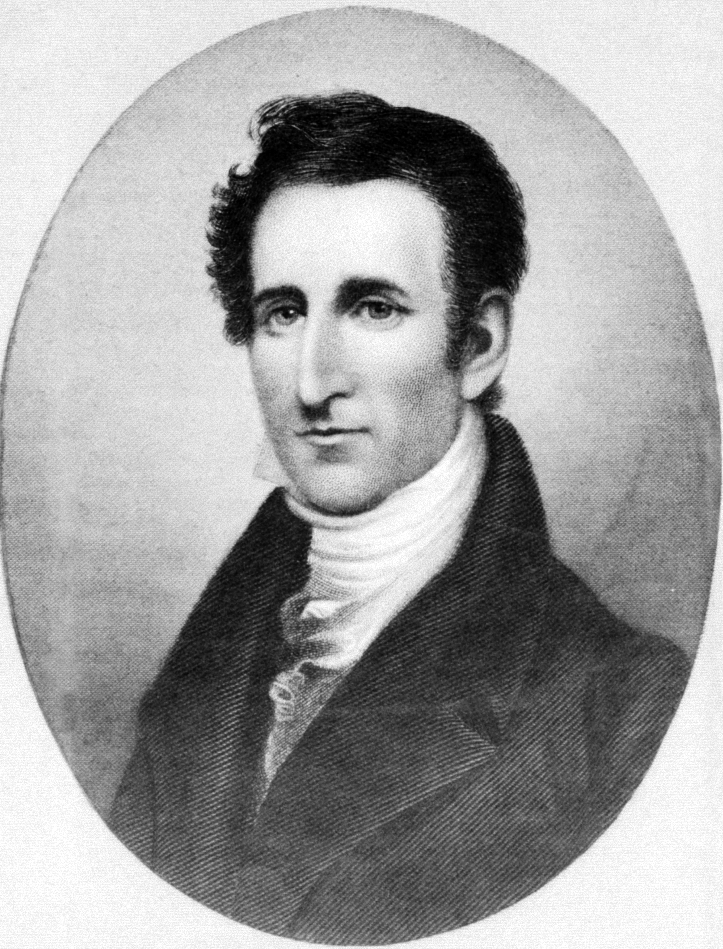
Candidate	John Taylor of Caroline	Henry St. George Tucker Sr.	John Tyler, Jr.
Party	Democratic-Republican	Democratic-Republican	Democratic-Republican
Percentage	51.8%	37.9%	10.3%

== See also ==
- 1822 United States elections
  - 1822–23 United States House of Representatives elections
- 17th United States Congress
- 18th United States Congress
