= Michael Jones (Illinois politician) =

American politician

Member of the Illinois House of Representatives
- In office 1832–1834

Member of the Illinois Senate
- In office 1818–1826
- Preceded by: inaugural

Michael Jones was an American politician who served as a member of the Illinois Senate and the Illinois House of Representatives.

Jones was a signatory of the First Illinois Constitutional Convention in 1818. He served as a state senator representing Gallatin County in the 1st, 2nd, 3rd, and 4th Illinois General Assemblies. He then served as a state representative for Gallatin County in the 8th Illinois General Assembly.
