= 1818–19 United States Senate elections =

- Dates vary by state
- Class 3

14 of the 42 seats in the United States Senate (plus special elections) 22 seats needed for a majority
	Majority party	Minority party
Party	Democratic-Republican	Federalist
Last election	25 seats	13 seats
Seats before	28	12
Seats won	14	0
Seats after	30	9
Seat change	▲3	▼3
Seats up	11	3
- Results: Dem-Republican hold Dem-Republican gain Legislature Failed To Elect
Majority Party before election
Democratic-Republican
Elected Majority Party
Democratic-Republican

The 1818–19 United States Senate elections were held on various dates in various states. As these U.S. Senate elections were prior to the ratification of the Seventeenth Amendment in 1913, senators were chosen by state legislatures. Senators were elected over a wide range of time throughout 1818 and 1819, and a seat may have been filled months late or remained vacant due to legislative deadlock. In these elections, terms were up for the senators in Class 3.

The Democratic-Republican Party gained two seats. The Federalist Party had only three seats being contested, of which they lost two and the third was left vacant due to a failure to elect.

== Results summary ==
Senate party division, 16th Congress (1819–1821)

- Majority party: Democratic-Republican (30–37)
- Minority party: Federalist (9)
- Vacant: 3–0
- Total seats: 42–46

== Change in composition ==
=== Before the elections ===
After the admission of Illinois.

									DR_{1}
DR_{11}	DR_{10}	DR_{9}	DR_{8}	DR_{7}	DR_{6}	DR_{5}	DR_{4}	DR_{3} Ill. New seat	DR_{2}
DR_{12}	DR_{13}	DR_{14}	DR_{15}	DR_{16}	DR_{17}	DR_{18}	DR_{19}	DR_{20} Ill. Ran	DR_{21} Ind. Ran
Majority →									DR_{22} N.C. Ran
F_{12} N.Y. Ran	DR_{30} Vt. Resigned	DR_{29} Pa. Retired	DR_{28} Ohio; Retired	DR_{27} La. Retired	DR_{26} N.H. Unknown	DR_{25} Ky. Unknown	DR_{24} Ga. Unknown	DR_{23} S.C. Ran	DR_{22} N.C. Ran
F_{11} Md. Ran	F_{10} Conn. Ran	F_{9}	F_{8}	F_{7}	F_{6}	F_{5}	F_{4}	F_{3}	F_{2}
									F_{1}

=== Result of the general elections ===
									DR_{1}
DR_{11}	DR_{10}	DR_{9}	DR_{8}	DR_{7}	DR_{6}	DR_{5}	DR_{4}	DR_{3}	DR_{2}
DR_{12}	DR_{13}	DR_{14}	DR_{15}	DR_{16}	DR_{17}	DR_{18}	DR_{19}	DR_{20} Ill. Re-elected	DR_{21} Ind. Re-elected
Majority →									DR_{22} N.C. Re-elected
DR_{31} Conn. Gain	DR_{30} Vt. Hold	DR_{29} Pa. Hold	DR_{28} Ohio; Hold	DR_{27} N.H. Hold	DR_{26} La. Hold	DR_{25} Ky. Hold	DR_{24} Ga. Hold	DR_{23} S.C. Re-elected	DR_{22} N.C. Re-elected
V_{1} N.Y. F Loss	V_{2} Md. F Loss	F_{9}	F_{8}	F_{7}	F_{6}	F_{5}	F_{4}	F_{3}	F_{2}
									F_{1}

=== Results of the 1819 special elections ===
								DR_{1}	DR_{2}
DR_{12}	DR_{11}	DR_{10} Va. Hold	DR_{9} Tenn. Hold	DR_{8} Ky. Hold	DR_{7} Ga. Hold	DR_{6}	DR_{5}	DR_{4}	DR_{3}
DR_{13}	DR_{14}	DR_{15}	DR_{16}	DR_{17}	DR_{18}	DR_{19}	DR_{20}	DR_{21}	DR_{22}
Majority →									DR_{23}
DR_{32} Ala. Cl.2; New seat	DR_{31}	DR_{30}	DR_{29}	DR_{28}	DR_{27}	DR_{26}	DR_{25}	DR_{24}	DR_{23}
DR_{33} Ala. Cl.3; New seat	DR_{34} Md. Cl.1; Gain	DR_{35} Md. Cl.3; Gain	V_{1}	F_{8}	F_{7}	F_{6}	F_{5}	F_{4}	F_{3}
								F_{2}	F_{1}

Key:

DR_{#}	Democratic-Republican
F_{#}	Federalist
V_{#}	Vacant

== Race summaries ==
=== Special elections during the 15th Congress ===
In these special elections, the winners were seated during 1818 or before March 4, 1819; ordered by election date.

State	Incumbent			Results	Candidates
State	Senator	Party	Electoral history	Results	Candidates
Louisiana (Class 2)	William C. C. Claiborne	Democratic- Republican	1817	Incumbent died November 23, 1817. New senator elected January 12, 1818. Democratic-Republican hold.	▌ ✓ Henry Johnson (Democratic-Republican) 30; ▌Mr. Livingston (Unknown) 5; ▌John MacDonough (Unknown) 4; ▌Dr. Hood (Unknown) 2
Massachusetts (Class 1)	Eli P. Ashmun	Federalist	1816 (special)	Incumbent resigned May 10, 1818. New senator elected June 5, 1818. Federalist hold.	▌ ✓ Prentiss Mellen (Democratic-Republican) 85; ▌William King (Democratic-Republican) 37; ▌James Bridge (Unknown) 2; ▌Mark L. Hill (Democratic-Republican) 1
Illinois (Class 3)	None (new state)			New state. New senators elected October 7, 1818 on the first and third ballot. Lots were drawn to assign them, respectively, to Classes 3 and 2. The Class 3 senator had to run again for re-election in 1819; see below. Two Democratic-Republican gains.	First ballot: ▌ ✓ Ninian Edwards (Democratic-Republican) 32; ▌ Leonard White (Unknown) 17; ▌ Jesse B. Thomas (Democratic-Republican) 15; ▌ Michael Jones (Unknown) 10; ▌Joseph M. Street (Unknown) 3; ▌Robert Morrison (Unknown) 3; Second ballot: ▌Leonard White (Unknown) 16; ▌Jesse B. Thomas (Democratic-Republican) 14; ▌Michael Jones (Unknown) 10; Third ballot: ▌ ✓ Jesse B. Thomas (Democratic-Republican) 21; ▌Leonard White (Unknown) 18; ▌Michael Jones (Unknown) 1
Illinois (Class 2)	None (new state)			New state. New senators elected October 7, 1818 on the first and third ballot. Lots were drawn to assign them, respectively, to Classes 3 and 2. The Class 3 senator had to run again for re-election in 1819; see below. Two Democratic-Republican gains.	First ballot: ▌ ✓ Ninian Edwards (Democratic-Republican) 32; ▌ Leonard White (Unknown) 17; ▌ Jesse B. Thomas (Democratic-Republican) 15; ▌ Michael Jones (Unknown) 10; ▌Joseph M. Street (Unknown) 3; ▌Robert Morrison (Unknown) 3; Second ballot: ▌Leonard White (Unknown) 16; ▌Jesse B. Thomas (Democratic-Republican) 14; ▌Michael Jones (Unknown) 10; Third ballot: ▌ ✓ Jesse B. Thomas (Democratic-Republican) 21; ▌Leonard White (Unknown) 18; ▌Michael Jones (Unknown) 1
Vermont (Class 3)	James Fisk	Democratic- Republican	1817 (special)	Incumbent resigned January 8, 1818 to serve as collector of customs for the district of Vermont. New senator elected October 20, 1818 to finish the term. Winner also elected to the following term, see below. Democratic-Republican hold.	▌ ✓ William Palmer (Democratic-Republican) 116; ▌Dudley Chase (Federalist) 54; ▌William A. Griswold (Democratic-Republican) 11; ▌Paul Brigham (Democratic-Republican) 7; Scattering 4
Georgia (Class 2)	George M. Troup	Democratic- Republican	1816 (special); 1816	Incumbent resigned September 23, 1818. New senator elected November 7, 1818 on the fourth ballot. Democratic-Republican hold.	▌ ✓ John Forsyth (Democratic-Republican) 86; ▌Nicholas Ware (Democratic-Republican) 29; ▌John M. Dooley (Unknown) 10

=== Races leading to the 16th Congress ===
In these general elections, the winner was seated on March 4, 1819 (except where noted due to late election); ordered by state.

All of the elections involved the Class 3 seats.

State	Incumbent			Results	Candidates
State	Senator	Party	Electoral history	Results	Candidates
Connecticut	David Daggett	Federalist	1813 (special)	Incumbent lost re-election. New senator elected October 22, 1818 on the third ballot. Democratic-Republican gain.	▌ ✓ James Lanman (Democratic-Republican) 114; ▌David Daggett (Federalist) 84; ▌Elijah Boardman (Democratic-Republican) 7; ▌Nathan Smith (Democratic-Republican) 3; ▌William Bristol (Democratic-Republican) 1
Georgia	Charles Tait	Democratic- Republican	1809 (special); 1813	Unknown if incumbent ran for re-election. New senator elected November 11, 1818. Democratic-Republican hold.	▌ ✓ John Elliot (Democratic-Republican) 72; ▌John Forsyth (Democratic-Republican) 53
Illinois	Ninian Edwards	Democratic- Republican	1818	Incumbent re-elected in early February 1819.	▌ ✓ Ninian Edwards (Democratic-Republican) 23; ▌Michael Jones (Unknown) 19
Indiana	Waller Taylor	Democratic- Republican	1816	Incumbent re-elected December 16, 1818.	▌ ✓ Waller Taylor (Democratic-Republican) 21; ▌James Scott (Unknown) 15; ▌Isaac Blackford (Democratic-Republican) 2
Kentucky	Isham Talbot	Democratic- Republican	1814 (special)	Unknown if incumbent ran for re-election. New senator elected December 17, 1818. Democratic-Republican hold.	▌ ✓ William Logan (Democratic-Republican) 67; ▌Richard Mentor Johnson (Democratic-Republican) 55
Louisiana	Eligius Fromentin	Democratic- Republican	1813	Incumbent retired. New senator elected on January 11, 1819, on the second ballot. Democratic-Republican hold.	▌ ✓ James Brown (Democratic-Republican); ▌John McDonough (Unknown) 9; ▌Abner Lawson Duncan (Democratic-Republican) 12; ▌Eligius Fromentin (Democratic-Republican) 1
Maryland	Robert Goldsborough	Federalist	1813 (special)	Incumbent lost re-election. Legislature failed to elect and the seat became vacant. Federalist loss.	None.
New Hampshire	Clement Storer	Democratic- Republican	1817 (special)	Unknown if incumbent ran for re-election. New senator elected in 1818 on the third ballot. Democratic-Republican hold.	▌ ✓ John Fabyan Parrott (Democratic-Republican) 97; ▌William Plumer (Democratic-Republican) 54; ▌Jeremiah Smith (Federalist) 11; ▌Josiah Butler (Democratic-Republican) 5; ▌Clement Storer (Democratic-Republican) 1
New York	Rufus King	Federalist	1813	Incumbent ran for re-election. Legislature failed to elect and the seat became vacant. Federalist loss. Incumbent was later re-elected in 1820, late in the next Congress.	▌John C. Spencer (Democratic-Republican/Clintonian); ▌Philetus Swift (Democratic-Republican); ▌Rufus King (Federalist); ▌John Van Ness Yates (Democratic-Republican/Bucktail); ▌John Wells (Federalist); ▌Samuel Young (Democratic-Republican/Bucktail)
North Carolina	Nathaniel Macon	Democratic- Republican	1815 (special)	Incumbent re-elected in 1818.	▌ ✓ Nathaniel Macon (Democratic-Republican) 166; Unopposed
Ohio	Jeremiah Morrow	Democratic- Republican	1812	Incumbent retired. New senator elected January 30, 1819 on the fourth ballot. Democratic-Republican hold.	▌ ✓ William Trimble (Democratic-Republican) 48; ▌Thomas Worthington (Democratic-Republican) 25; ▌John E. Hamm (Democratic-Republican) 18
Pennsylvania	Abner Lacock	Democratic- Republican	1812	Incumbent retired. New senator elected December 8, 1818. Democratic-Republican hold.	▌ ✓ Walter Lowrie (Democratic-Republican) 87; ▌Isaac Weaver Jr. (Democratic-Republican) 32; ▌John Tod (Democratic-Republican) 1; Not voting 8
South Carolina	John Gaillard	Democratic- Republican	1812	Incumbent re-elected in 1818.	▌ ✓ John Gaillard (Democratic-Republican) 96; ▌John R. Richardson (Unknown) 61
Vermont	James Fisk	Democratic- Republican	1817 (special)	Incumbent resigned January 8, 1818 to serve as collector of customs for the district of Vermont. New senator elected October 20, 1818. Winner also elected to finish the term; see above. Democratic-Republican hold.	▌ ✓ William A. Palmer (Democratic-Republican) 133; ▌Dudley Chase (Federalist) 49; ▌William A. Griswold (Democratic-Republican) 7; ▌Paul Brigham (Democratic-Republican) 5

=== Special elections during the 16th Congress ===
In these special elections, the winners were seated in 1819 after March 4; ordered by election date. The new Congress was seated December 6, 1819, so some of these late-elected senators were seated after that.

State	Incumbent			Results	Candidates
State	Senator	Party	Electoral history	Results	Candidates
Tennessee (Class 1)	John H. Eaton	Democratic- Republican	1818 (appointed)	Interim appointee elected October 9, 1819.	▌ ✓ John Eaton (Democratic-Republican) 31; ▌Parry W. Humphreys (Democratic-Republican) 29
Georgia (Class 2)	John Forsyth	Democratic- Republican	1818 (special)	Incumbent resigned February 17, 1819 to become U.S. Minister to Spain. New senator elected November 6, 1819. Democratic-Republican hold.	▌ ✓ Freeman Walker (Democratic-Republican); Unopposed
Kentucky (Class 2)	John Crittenden	Democratic- Republican	1816	Incumbent resigned March 3, 1819 to return to private practice. New senator elected December 10, 1819. Democratic-Republican hold.	▌ ✓ Richard Mentor Johnson (Democratic-Republican) 68; ▌John Adair (Federalist) 53
Virginia (Class 2)	John Eppes	Democratic- Republican	1816	Incumbent resigned December 4, 1819 because of ill health. New senator elected December 10, 1819. Democratic-Republican hold.	▌ ✓ James Pleasants (Democratic-Republican) 146; ▌John Taliaferro (Democratic-Republican) 42
Alabama (Class 2)	None (new state)			New state. New senator elected December 14, 1819. Democratic-Republican gain.	▌ ✓ William R. King (Democratic-Republican) 56; ▌John W. Walker (Democratic-Republican) 11; ▌Thomas D. Crabb (Unknown) 2
Alabama (Class 3)	None (new state)			New state. New senator elected December 14, 1819. Democratic-Republican gain.	▌ ✓ John W. Walker (Democratic-Republican) 59; ▌Thomas D. Crabb (Unknown) 7; ▌George Phillips (Unknown) 2; ▌William R. King (Democratic-Republican) 1
Maryland (Class 3)	Vacant			Legislature had failed to elect; see above. New senator elected late December 14, 1819 and qualified December 21, 1819. Democratic-Republican gain.	▌ ✓ Edward Lloyd (Democratic-Republican) 50; ▌ ✓ William Pinkney (Democratic-Republican) 49; ▌Charles Carroll (Federalist) 37; ▌Robert Goldsborough (Federalist) 34; ▌Charles Goldsborough (Federalist) 4; ▌Samuel Smith (Unknown) 1; ▌John Graham (Democratic-Republican) 1
Maryland (Class 1)	Alexander Hanson	Federalist	1816 (special)	Incumbent died April 23, 1819. New senator elected December 14, 1819 and qualified December 21, 1819. Democratic-Republican gain.	▌ ✓ Edward Lloyd (Democratic-Republican) 50; ▌ ✓ William Pinkney (Democratic-Republican) 49; ▌Charles Carroll (Federalist) 37; ▌Robert Goldsborough (Federalist) 34; ▌Charles Goldsborough (Federalist) 4; ▌Samuel Smith (Unknown) 1; ▌John Graham (Democratic-Republican) 1

== Maryland ==
1819 United States Senate elections in Maryland
- December 14, 1819

80 members of the Maryland General Assembly
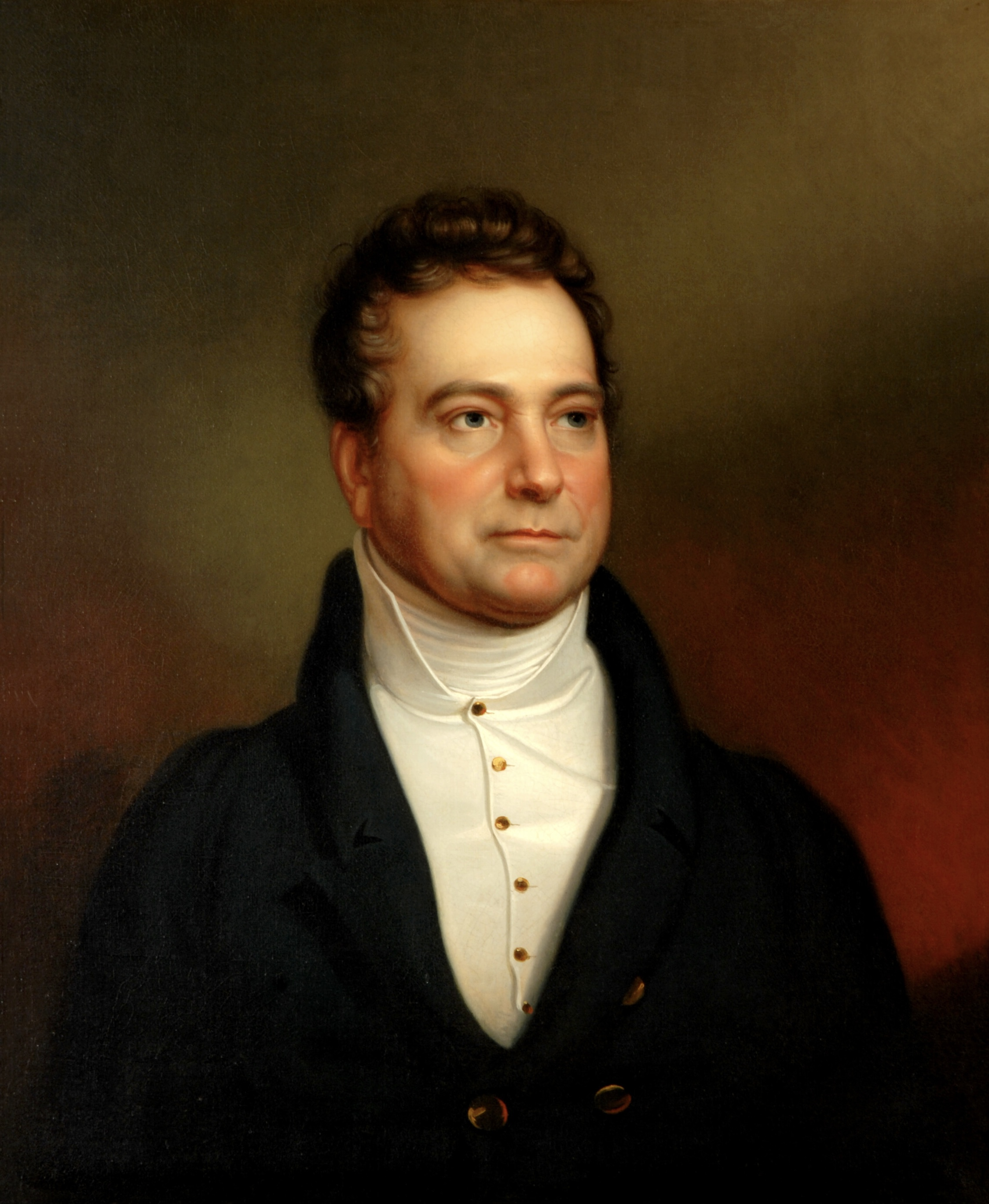

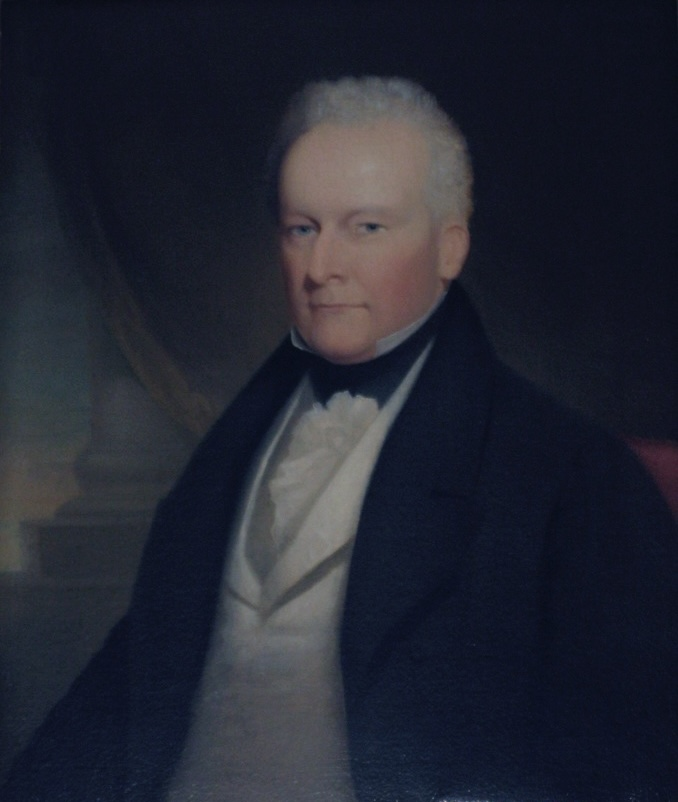
Candidate	William Pinkney	Edward Lloyd
Party	Democratic-Republican	Democratic-Republican
Legislative vote	49	50
Percentage	27.84%	28.41%

Due to both the Class 3 seat falling vacant at the normal end of the term and the Class 1 seat falling vacant due to the death of Alexander Contee Hanson, the legislature voted for both seats simultaneously. Edward Lloyd received the most votes and won the Class 3 seat. William Pinkney received the second-most votes and won the Class 1 seat.

== See also ==
- 1818 United States elections
  - 1818–19 United States House of Representatives elections
- 16th United States Congress
- 17th United States Congress
