= 1819 United States Senate elections in Maryland =

- December 14, 1819

80 members of the Maryland General Assembly
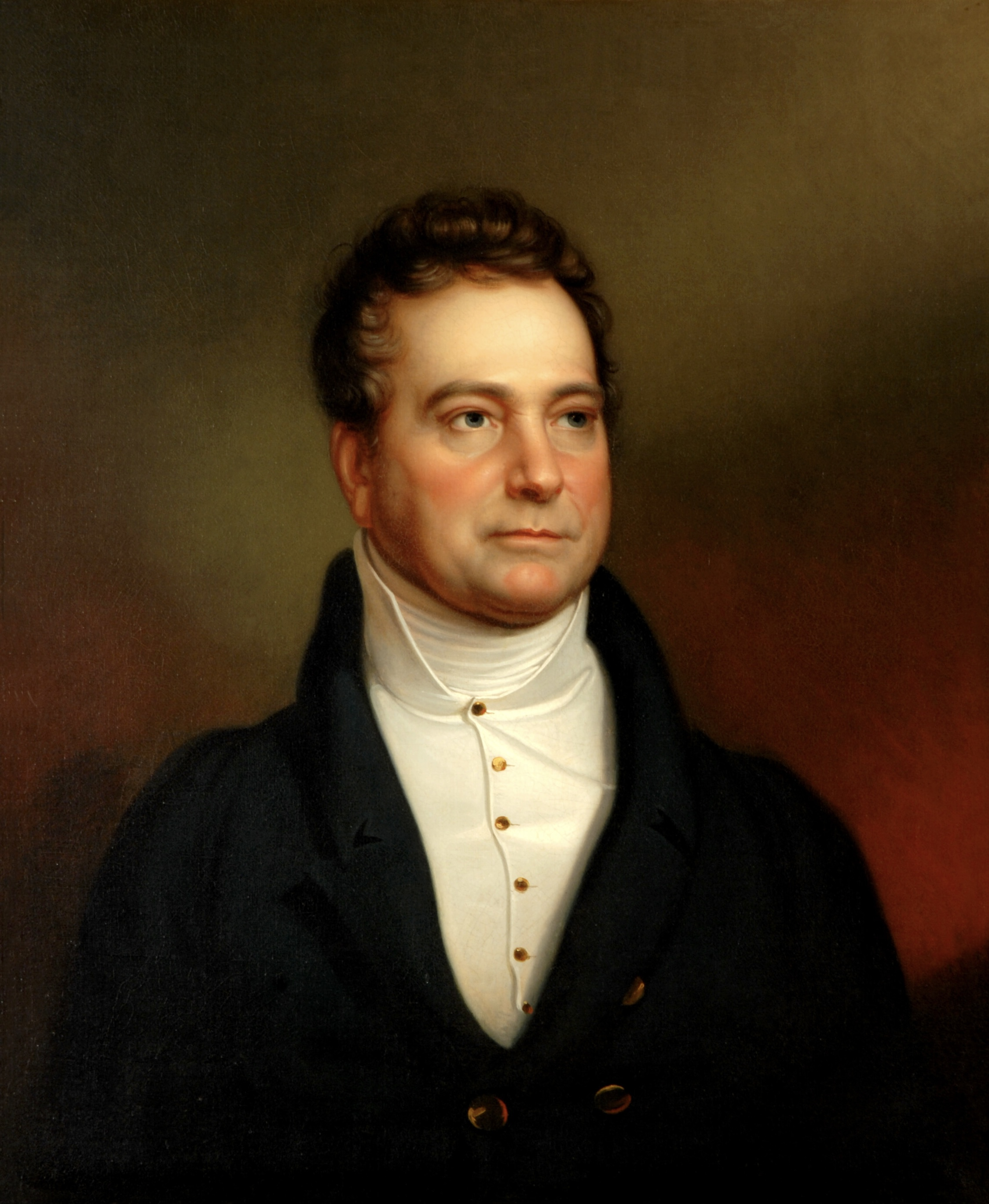

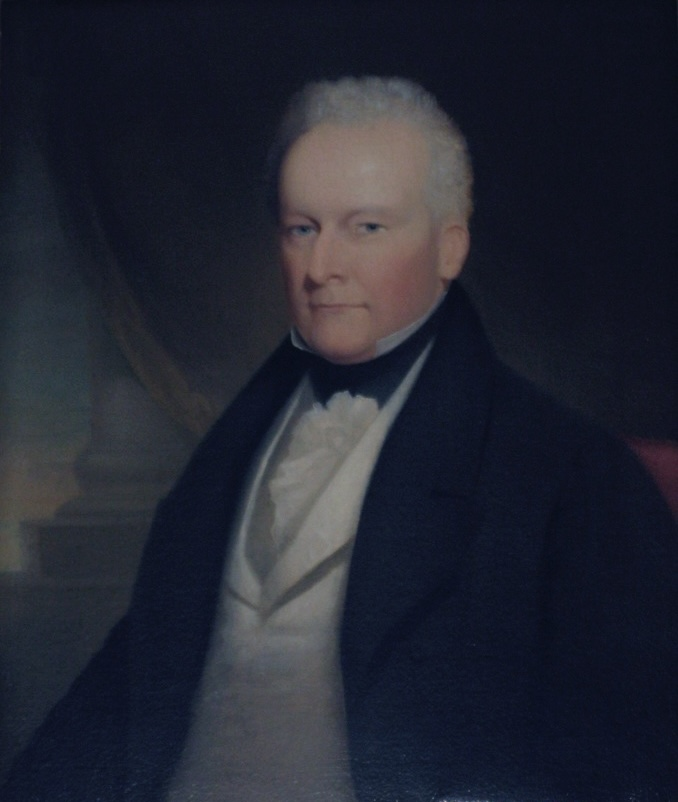
Candidate	William Pinkney	Edward Lloyd
Party	Democratic-Republican	Democratic-Republican
Legislative vote	49	50
Percentage	27.84%	28.41%

On April 23, 1819, incumbent Federalist senator Alexander Contee Hanson died. The other incumbent senator, Robert Henry Goldsborough, ran for re-election to hold his seat. The Maryland legislature elected a successor to finish Hanson's term, as well as a senator for the term for the other class. The two top vote-getters (both Democratic-Republicans) were declared the winners, with the first-place winner, Edward Lloyd taking the Class 3 seat, which ran March 4, 1819, to March 3, 1825. The second-place winner, William Pinkney, took the Class 1 seat, finishing Hanson's term which ran March 4, 1817, to March 3, 1823.

- √ Edward Lloyd (Democratic-Republican) 28.41%
- √ William Pinkney (Democratic-Republican) 27.84%
- Charles Carroll (Federalist) 21.02%
- Robert Henry Goldsborough (Federalist) 19.32%
- Charles Goldsborough (Federalist) 2.27%
- Samuel Smith (Unknown) 0.57%
- John Graham (Democratic-Republican) 0.57%

== See also ==
- 1818 and 1819 United States Senate elections
