= List of elections in 1825 =

The following elections occurred in the year 1825.

== United States ==
=== United States Senate ===
- 1824 and 1825 United States Senate elections
- 1825–1826 United States Senate election in New York

=== United States House of Representatives ===
- 1824 and 1825 United States House of Representatives elections
- 1825 Kentucky's 3rd congressional district special election
- 1825 New Hampshire's at-large congressional district special election
- 1825 North Carolina's 2nd congressional district special election
- 1825 South Carolina's 1st congressional district special election

=== United States lieutenant gubernatorial ===
- 1825 Connecticut lieutenant gubernatorial election

=== United States gubernatorial ===
- 1825 Alabama gubernatorial election
- 1825 Connecticut gubernatorial election
- 1825 Georgia gubernatorial election
- 1825 Maine gubernatorial election
- 1825 Massachusetts gubernatorial election
- 1825 Mississippi gubernatorial election
- 1825 Missouri gubernatorial special election
- 1825 New Hampshire gubernatorial election
- 1825 New Jersey gubernatorial election
- 1825 North Carolina gubernatorial election
- 1825 Rhode Island gubernatorial election
- 1825 Tennessee gubernatorial election
- 1825 Vermont gubernatorial election
- 1825 Virginia gubernatorial election

=== United States mayoral elections ===
- April 1825 Boston mayoral election
- December 1825 Boston mayoral election

== South America ==
- 1825 Colombian general election
- 1825 Costa Rican Head of State election

== See also ==
- Category:1825 elections
