= List of elections in 1827 =

The following elections occurred in the year 1827.

- 1827 Chilean presidential election
- 1827 French legislative election

== North America ==
=== United States ===
==== United States Senate ====
- 1826 and 1827 United States Senate elections
- United States Senate election in New York, 1827

==== United States House of Representatives ====
- 1826 and 1827 United States House of Representatives elections

==== United States lieutenant gubernatorial ====
- 1827 Connecticut lieutenant gubernatorial election

==== United States gubernatorial ====
- 1827 Alabama gubernatorial election
- 1827 Connecticut gubernatorial election
- 1827 Georgia gubernatorial election
- 1827 Maine gubernatorial election
- 1827 Maryland gubernatorial election
- 1827 Massachusetts gubernatorial election
- 1827 Mississippi gubernatorial election
- 1827 New Hampshire gubernatorial election
- 1827 New Jersey gubernatorial election
- 1827 Rhode Island gubernatorial election
- 1827 Tennessee gubernatorial election
- 1827 Vermont gubernatorial election
- 1827 Virginia gubernatorial election
- 1827 Virginia gubernatorial special election

==== United States mayoral elections ====
- 1827 Boston mayoral election

== See also ==
- Category:1827 elections
