= 1830 Virginia gubernatorial election =

- January 9, 1830
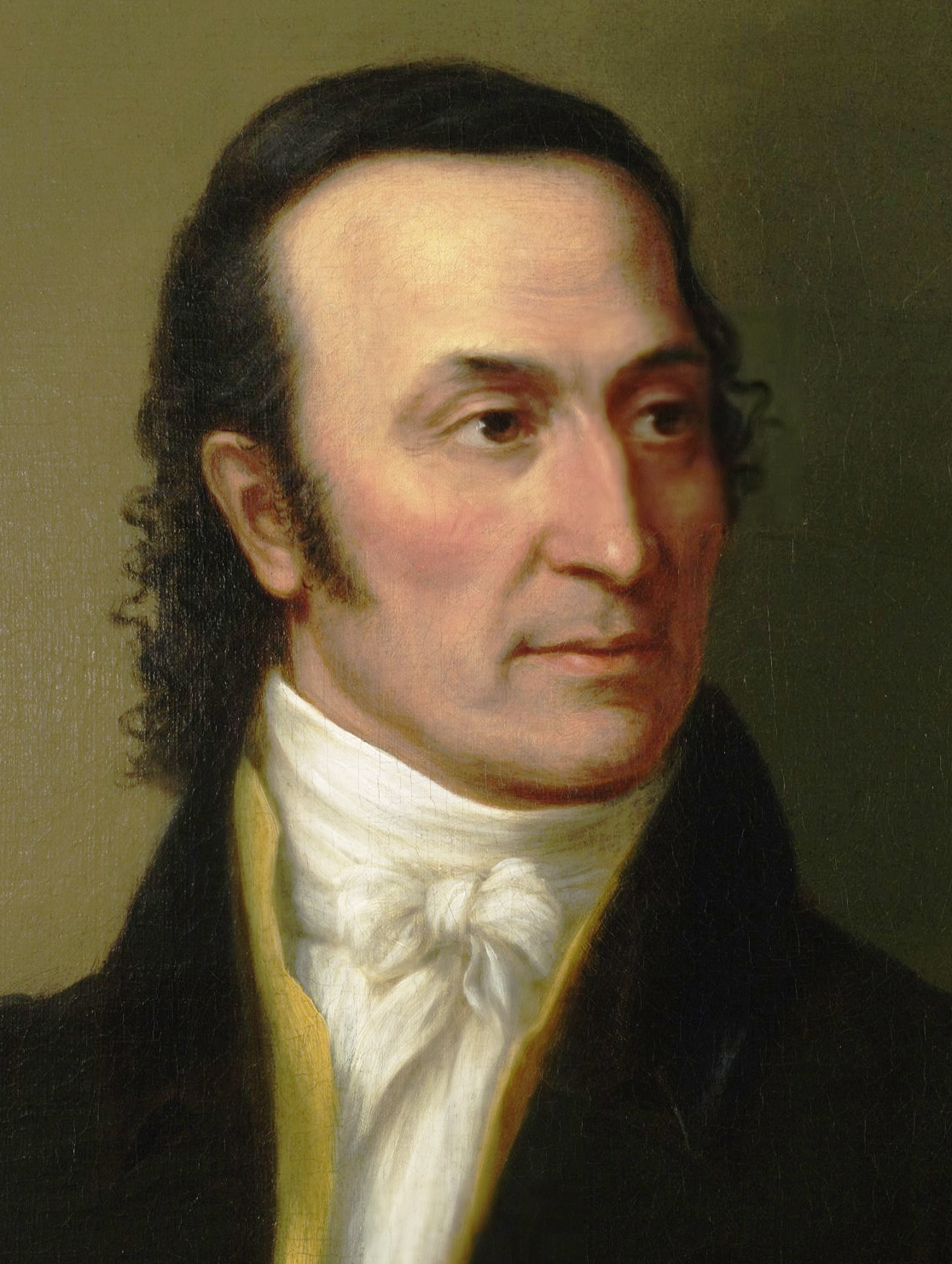

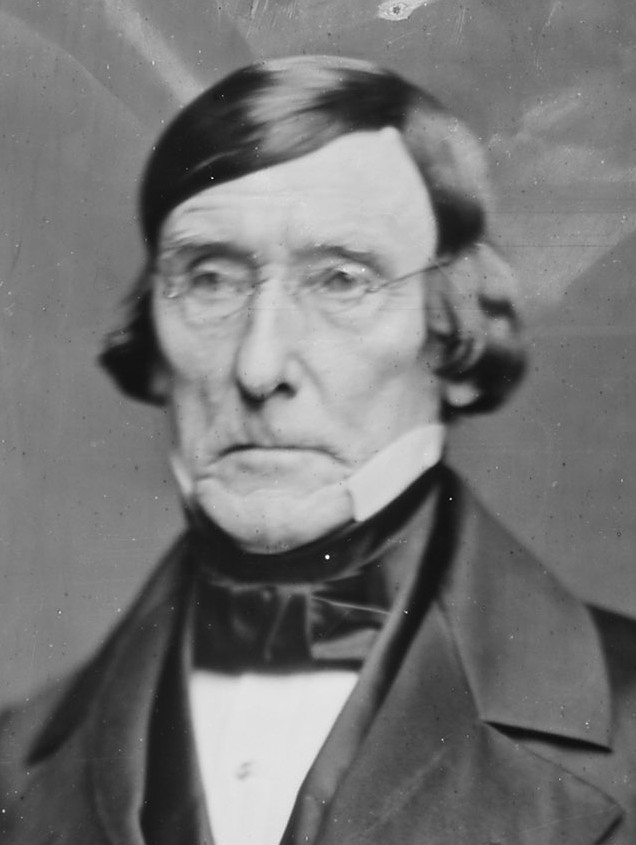
Nominee	John Floyd	Peter V. Daniel
Party	Democratic	Democratic
1st ballot	140	66
Governor before election
William Branch Giles
Democratic
Elected Governor
John Floyd
Democratic

A gubernatorial election was held in Virginia on January 9, 1830. The Democratic former U.S. representative from Virginia's 20th congressional district John Floyd defeated the Democratic member of the Council of State Peter V. Daniel.

The incumbent governor of Virginia William Branch Giles was ineligible for re-election due to term limits established by the Constitution of Virginia. Giles won the 1827 Virginia gubernatorial special election to succeed John Tyler, who resigned the governorship effective March 4, 1827, following his election to the United States Senate. Whether Giles was elected to serve a new one-year term beginning the date of Tyler's resignation, or merely to complete his predecessor's original unexpired term, was discussed at the time of his re-election in 1827 and again in 1828, without resolution. When the legislature met in December 1829, Richard Epps proposed that the election of Giles's successor take place on December 16, but the question of when the new governor would take office prompted a lengthy debate. A resolution recognizing March 4, 1830, as the expiration of Giles's term was passed by the House of Delegates and finally adopted by the Virginia Senate, by which time the election had been postponed until January.

Events during the first year of Andrew Jackson's presidency served to divide the Virginia Democratic Party. Whereas the powerful Richmond Junto, which included Daniel, had cultivated a close relationship with the U.S. secretary of state Martin Van Buren and were rewarded liberally with patronage, Old Republican allies of the vice president of the United States John C. Calhoun found themselves isolated from the administration as Calhoun's relationship with Jackson deteriorated. Floyd, a Calhounite, was passed over for a position in Jackson's cabinet, and would soon emerge as the leader of the state's anti-Jackson Democrats.

The election was conducted by the Virginia General Assembly in joint session. Floyd was elected with a majority on the first ballot.

== General election ==
1830 Virginia gubernatorial election
Party	Candidate	First ballot	
Party	Candidate	Count	Percent
Democratic	John Floyd	140	65.73
Democratic	Peter V. Daniel	66	30.98
Others		7	3.29
Total		213	100.00

== Bibliography ==
- Dent, Lynwood Miller (1974). The Virginia Democratic Party, 1824-1847. (Volumes I and II) (PhD thesis). [Baton Rouge]: Louisiana State University.
- Simms, Henry H. (1929). The Rise of the Whigs in Virginia, 1824–1840. Richmond: William Byrd Press.
- Sobel, Robert; Raimo, John (1978). Biographical Directory of the Governors of the United States 1789–1978. Vol. 4. Westport, CT: Meckler Books.
- Virginia (1829). Journal of the Senate [...]. Richmond.
