= 1826 United States elections =

- ← 1824 1825 1826 1827 1828 → Midterm elections
- Incumbent president: ▌John Quincy Adams (DR)
- Next Congress: 20th

Senate elections
- Overall control: Jacksonian hold
- Seats contested: 16 of 48 seats
- Net seat change: Jacksonian +1

House elections
- Overall control: Jacksonian gain
- Seats contested: All 213 voting seats
- Net seat change: Jacksonian +9

Elections occurred in the middle of Democratic-Republican President John Quincy Adams's term. Members of the 20th United States Congress were chosen in this election. The election took place during a transitional period between the First Party System and the Second Party System. With the Federalist Party no longer active as a major political party, the major split in Congress was between supporters of Adams and supporters of Andrew Jackson, who Adams had defeated in the 1824 Presidential election.

In the House, Jackson supporters picked up several seats, taking the majority from the faction supporting Adams. Andrew Stevenson, a supporter of Jackson who later joined the Democratic Party, won election as Speaker of the House.

In the Senate, supporters of Jackson picked up one seat, retaining their majority.

== See also ==
- 1826–27 United States House of Representatives elections
- 1826–27 United States Senate elections
