= 1824–25 United States Senate elections =

- Dates vary by state
- Class 3

16 of the 48 seats in the United States Senate (plus special elections) 25 seats needed for a majority
	Majority party	Minority party
Party	Jacksonian	Anti-Jacksonian
Seats won	8	10
Seats after	25	20
Seat change	▲25	▲20
Seats up	0	0
	Third party	Fourth party
Party	Democratic-Republican	Federalist
Last election	44 seats	3 seats
Seats before	43	5
Seat change	▼43	▼5
Seats up	15	1
- Results: Jacksonian Hold Jacksonian Gain; Anti-Jacksonian Hold Anti-Jacksonian Gain; Legislature Failed To Elect
Majority Party before election
Democratic-Republican
Elected Majority Party
Jacksonian

The 1824–25 United States Senate Elections were held on various dates in various states. As these U.S. Senate elections were prior to the ratification of the Seventeenth Amendment in 1913, senators were chosen by state legislatures. Senators were elected over a wide range of time throughout 1824 and 1825, and a seat may have been filled months late or remained vacant due to legislative deadlock. In these elections, terms were up for the senators in Class 3.

The Jacksonians gained a majority over the Anti-Jacksonian National Republican Party.

== Results summary ==
Senate party division, 19th Congress (1825–1827)

- Majority party: Jacksonian (26)
- Minority party: Anti-Jacksonian (22)
- Total seats: 48

== Change in composition ==
=== Before the elections ===
						DR_{1}	DR_{1}	DR_{3}	DR_{4}
DR_{14}	DR_{13}	DR_{12}	DR_{11}	DR_{10}	DR_{9}	DR_{8}	DR_{7}	DR_{6}	DR_{5}
DR_{15}	DR_{16}	DR_{17}	DR_{18}	DR_{19}	DR_{20}	DR_{21}	DR_{22}	DR_{23}	DR_{24}
Majority →									DR_{24}
DR_{34} Ohio; Ran new party	DR_{33} N.C. Ran new party	DR_{32} Mo. Ran new party	DR_{31} Md. Ran new party	DR_{30} La. Ran new party	DR_{29} Conn. Ran new party	DR_{28}	DR_{27}	DR_{26}	DR_{25}
DR_{35} S.C. Ran new party	DR_{36} Ala. Unknown	DR_{37} Ga. Unknown	DR_{38} Ill. Unknown	DR_{39} Ky. Unknown	DR_{40} N.H. Unknown	DR_{41} Ind. Retired	DR_{42} Pa. Retired	DR_{43} Vt. Retired	Fa_{5} N.Y. Retired
						Fa_{1}	Fa_{2}	Fa_{3}	Fa_{4}

=== Election results ===
						DR_{1}	DR_{1}	DR_{3}	DR_{4}
DR_{14}	DR_{13}	DR_{12}	DR_{11}	DR_{10}	DR_{9}	DR_{8}	DR_{7}	DR_{6}	DR_{5}
DR_{15}	DR_{16}	DR_{17}	DR_{18}	DR_{19}	DR_{20}	DR_{21}	DR_{22}	DR_{23}	DR_{24}
Majority →									DR_{24}
AJ_{6} Pa. Gain	AJ_{5} Ohio; Gain	AJ_{4} Ind. Gain	AJ_{3} Vt. Re-elected new party	AJ_{2} Mo. Re-elected new party	AJ_{1} La. Re-elected new party	DR_{28}	DR_{27}	DR_{26}	DR_{25}
V_{1} Conn. DR Loss	V_{2} N.Y. F Loss	J_{8} N.H. Gain	J_{7} Ky. Gain	J_{6} Ill. Gain	J_{5} Ga. Gain	J_{4} Ala. Gain	J_{3} S.C. Re-elected new party	J_{2} N.C. Re-elected new party	J_{1} Md. Re-elected new party
						Fa_{1}	Fa_{2}	Fa_{3}	Fa_{4}

=== Beginning of the next Congress ===
						AJ_{1}	AJ_{2}	AJ_{3}	AJ_{4}
AJ_{14}	AJ_{13}	AJ_{12}	AJ_{11}	AJ_{10}	AJ_{9}	AJ_{8}	AJ_{7}	AJ_{6}	AJ_{5}
AJ_{15}	AJ_{16}	AJ_{17}	AJ_{18}	AJ_{19}	AJ_{20}	V_{1}	V_{2}	V_{3}	J_{25}
Majority →									J_{24}
J_{15}	J_{16}	J_{17}	J_{18}	J_{19}	J_{20}	J_{21}	J_{22}	J_{23}	J_{24}
J_{14}	J_{13}	J_{12}	J_{11}	J_{10}	J_{9}	J_{8}	J_{7}	J_{6}	J_{5}
						J_{1}	J_{2}	J_{3}	J_{4}

Key:

18th Congress		19th Congress	
DR_{#}	Democratic-Republican	AJ_{#}	Anti-Jacksonian
F_{#}	Federalist	J_{#}	Jacksonian
		V_{#}	Vacant

== Race summaries ==
Bold states link to specific election articles.

=== Special elections during the 18th Congress ===
In these special elections, the winners were seated during 1824 or before March 4, 1825; ordered by election date.

State	Incumbent			Results	Candidates
State	Senator	Party	Electoral history	Results	Candidates
Delaware (Class 2)	Vacant			Legislature had failed to elect. Incumbent re-elected late January 9, 1824. Federalist gain.	▌ ✓ Nicholas Van Dyke (Federalist) 18; ▌Andrew Gray (Democratic-Republican) 9; Blank 1
Delaware (Class 1)	Vacant			Caesar A. Rodney (DR) resigned January 29, 1823 in the previous Congress. Successor elected January 13, 1824. Federalist gain.	▌ ✓ Thomas Clayton (Federalist) 19; ▌Henry M. Ridgely (Federalist) 9; ▌William H. White (Federalist) 1
Louisiana (Class 3)	James Brown	Democratic- Republican	1819	Incumbent resigned December 10, 1823 to become U.S. Minister to France. Successor elected January 15, 1824. Democratic-Republican hold. Successor later re-elected; see below.	▌ ✓ Josiah S. Johnston (Adams-Clay D-R) 29; ▌Edward Livingston (Jackson D-R) 27
Connecticut (Class 2)	Henry W. Edwards	Democratic- Republican	1823 (appointed)	Interim appointee elected May 5, 1824.	▌ ✓ Henry W. Edwards (Jackson D-R); [data missing]
Louisiana (Class 2)	Henry Johnson	Democratic- Republican	1818 (appointed); 1823 (special)	Incumbent resigned May 27, 1824 to become Governor of Louisiana. Successor elected November 19, 1824. Democratic-Republican hold.	▌ ✓ Dominique Bouligny (Adams-Clay D-R) 33; ▌J. H. Harper (Unknown) 14 votes; ▌P. Thomas (Unknown) 11 votes
Illinois (Class 3)	Ninian Edwards	Democratic- Republican	1818; 1819	Incumbent resigned March 3, 1824. Successor elected November 24, 1824 on the third ballot, but not to next term. Democratic-Republican hold.	▌ ✓ John McLean (Democratic-Republican); [data missing]
Georgia (Class 2)	Nicholas Ware	Democratic- Republican	1821 (special); 1823	Incumbent died September 7, 1824. Successor elected December 6, 1824. Democratic-Republican hold.	▌ ✓ Thomas W. Cobb (Jackson D-R); [data missing]
Virginia (Class 2)	John Taylor	Democratic- Republican	1792 (special); 1793	Died August 21, 1824. Successor elected December 7, 1824. Democratic-Republican hold.	▌ ✓ Littleton Tazewell (Jackson D-R); [data missing]

=== Races leading to the 19th Congress ===
In these general elections, the winner was seated on March 4, 1825 (except where noted due to late election); ordered by state.

All of the elections involved the Class 3 seats.

State	Incumbent			Results	Candidates
State	Senator	Party	Electoral history	Results	Candidates
Alabama	William Kelly	Democratic-Republican (Jackson faction)	1822 (special)	Incumbent retired or lost re-election. Successor elected in 1824. Jacksonian gain.	▌ ✓ Henry H. Chambers (Jacksonian); [data missing]
Connecticut	James Lanman	Democratic-Republican (Crawford faction)	1818	Vacant due to a deadlock in the Connecticut State Legislature. Governor attempted to appoint the incumbent to begin the next term. U.S. Senate refused to seat incumbent. Democratic-Republican loss.	House election: ▌ Calvin Willey (National Republican) 99; ▌ Elisha Phelps 65; ▌ John Samuel Peters (National Republican) 19; ▌ Others 9; Senate election: ▌ Calvin Willey (National Republican) 5; ▌ Elisha Phelps 5
Georgia	John Elliott	Democratic-Republican (Crawford faction)	1819	Incumbent retired or lost re-election. Successor elected in 1824. Jacksonian gain.	▌ ✓ John M. Berrien (Jacksonian); [data missing]
Illinois	Ninian Edwards	Democratic-Republican (Adams-Clay faction)	1818; 1819	Incumbent retired or lost re-election. Successor elected in 1824 on the tenth ballot. Jacksonian gain.	▌ ✓ Elias Kane (Jacksonian) 28; ▌Samuel D. Lockwood (Anti-Jacksonian) 21; ▌Thomas Sloo Jr. (Jacksonian) 2; ▌Edward Coles (Independent) 1
Indiana	Waller Taylor	Democratic-Republican (Adams-Clay faction)	1816; 1818	Incumbent retired. Successor elected in 1825 on the fourth ballot. Anti-Jacksonian gain.	▌ ✓ William Hendricks (Anti-Jacksonian); [data missing]
Kentucky	Isham Talbot	Democratic-Republican (Adams-Clay faction)	1815 (special); 1819 (lost or retired); 1820 (special)	Incumbent retired or lost re-election. Successor elected in 1824. Jacksonian gain.	▌ ✓ John Rowan (Jacksonian); [data missing]
Louisiana	Josiah S. Johnston	Democratic-Republican (Adams-Clay faction)	1824	Incumbent re-elected in 1825 on the second ballot as an Anti-Jacksonian.	▌ ✓ Josiah S. Johnston (Anti-Jacksonian) 32; ▌Edward Livingston (Democratic-Republican) 27
Maryland	Edward Lloyd	Democratic-Republican (Crawford faction)	1819	Incumbent re-elected in 1825 as a Jacksonian.	▌ ✓ Edward Lloyd (Jacksonian); [data missing]
Missouri	David Barton	Democratic-Republican (Adams-Clay faction)	1821	Incumbent re-elected in 1824 as an Anti-Jacksonian.	▌ ✓ David Barton (Anti-Jacksonian); [data missing]
New Hampshire	John F. Parrott	Democratic-Republican (Adams-Clay faction)	1818	Incumbent retired or lost re-election. Successor elected in 1825 on the forty-first ballot. (Note: There were 36 ballots in 1824 in which the New Hampshire House of Representatives and New Hampshire Senate would not agree on a U.S. senator. Balloting continued into 1825, and Woodbury was finally elected on the 5th ballot.); Jacksonian gain. Successor seated late March 16, 1825.	▌ ✓ Levi Woodbury (Jacksonian) 115; ▌Jeremiah Mason (Federalist) 53; ▌Samuel Dinsmoor (Democratic-Republican) 43; ▌William Plumer Jr. (Anti-Jacksonian) 1; ▌Nay 2 votes
New York	Rufus King	Federalist (Adams-Clay faction)	1789; 1795; 1796 (resigned); 1813; 1819/1820	Incumbent retired. Vacant due to a deadlock in the New York State Legislature. Federalist loss.	17 candidates
North Carolina	Nathaniel Macon	Democratic-Republican (Crawford faction)	1815 (special); 1818	Incumbent re-elected in 1824 as a Jacksonian.	▌ ✓ Nathaniel Macon (Jacksonian); [data missing]
Ohio	Ethan Allen Brown	Democratic-Republican (Adams-Clay faction)	1822 (special)	Incumbent lost re-election. Successor elected in 1825 on the fourth ballot. Anti-Jacksonian gain.	▌ ✓ William Henry Harrison (Anti-Jacksonian); ▌Ethan Allen Brown (Democratic-Republican); [data missing]
Pennsylvania	Walter Lowrie	Democratic-Republican (Crawford faction)	1818	Incumbent retired. Successor elected in February 1825 on the thirty-second ballot. Anti-Jacksonian gain.	▌ ✓ William Marks (Anti-Jacksonian) 73; ▌Thomas Burnside (Democratic-Republican) 27; ▌John Sergeant (Federalist) 19; ▌Samuel D. Ingham (Democratic-Republican) 2
South Carolina	John Gaillard	Democratic-Republican (Crawford faction)	1804 (special); 1806; 1812; 1818	Incumbent re-elected in 1824 on the second ballot as a Jacksonian.	▌ ✓ John Gaillard (Jacksonian) 82; ▌Daniel E. Huger (Jacksonian) 67; ▌Warren R. Davis (Jacksonian) 7; Blank 1
Vermont	William A. Palmer	Democratic-Republican (Adams-Clay faction)	1818 (special); 1818	Incumbent retired. Successor elected in 1824 on the fourth ballot. Anti-Jacksonian gain.	▌ ✓ Dudley Chase (Anti-Jacksonian); [data missing]

=== Special elections during the 19th Congress ===
In these special elections, the winners were seated in 1825 after March 4; ordered by election date.

State	Incumbent			Results	Candidates
State	Senator	Party	Electoral history	Results	Candidates
Connecticut (Class 3)	Vacant			Vacant due to credentials challenge. Successor elected May 4, 1825. Anti-Jacksonian gain.	▌ ✓ Calvin Willey (Anti-Jacksonian); [data missing]
Tennessee (Class 2)	Andrew Jackson	Jacksonian	1797 (special); 1798 (resigned); 1823	Incumbent resigned October 14, 1825. Successor elected October 28, 1825. Jacksonian hold.	▌ ✓ Hugh Lawson White (Jacksonian); Unanimous
Rhode Island (Class 2)	James DeWolf	Anti-Jacksonian	1820/1821	Incumbent resigned October 31, 1825. Successor elected October 31, 1825. Anti-Jacksonian hold.	▌ ✓ Asher Robbins (Anti-Jacksonian) 43; ▌Elisha R. Potter (Unknown) 36; Scattering 2

== Delaware ==
=== Delaware (special, class 1) ===
1824 United States Senate class 1 special election in Delaware
- January 13, 1824

29 members of the Delaware General Assembly
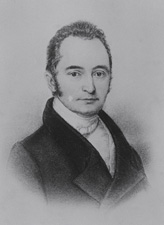

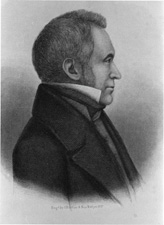
Candidate	Thomas Clayton	Henry M. Ridgely
Party	Federalist	Federalist
Alliance	Anti-Jacksonian	Jacksonian
Legislative vote	19	9
Percentage	65.5%	31.0%

Incumbent Democratic-Republican Caesar A. Rodney resigned on January 29, 1823, after being appointed U.S. Minister Plenipotentiary to the United Provinces of the River Plate, an office now known as the U.S. Ambassador to Argentina, by President James Monroe. A special election was held on January 13, 1824. Federalist Anti-Jacksonian Thomas Clayton, a Delaware State Senator and former congressman was elected to the office, beating Delaware State Representative Henry M. Ridgely, who was also a Federalist, but one with Jacksonian sympathies.

=== Delaware (special, class 2) ===
1824 United States Senate class 2 special election in Delaware
- January 9, 1824

28 members of the Delaware General Assembly
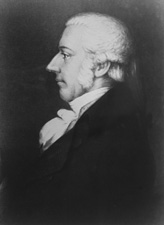
Nominee	Nicholas Van Dyke	Andrew Gray
Party	Federalist	Democratic-Republican
Legislative vote	18	9
Percentage	64.3%	32.1%

The Delaware General Assembly had failed to elect a senator in the previous election cycle. Nicholas Van Dyke, the incumbent, was reelected late.

== Illinois ==
=== Illinois (special) ===
Incumbent Democratic-Republican Ninian Edwards resigned on March 3, 1824, to become the U.S. Minister to Mexico, although he never took office. Former Speaker of the Illinois House of Representatives John McLean, a Democratic-Republican was elected to take his place on November 24, 1824.

== Louisiana ==
=== Louisiana (special) ===
1824 United States Senate special election in Louisiana
- January 15, 1824

56 members of the Louisiana State Legislature
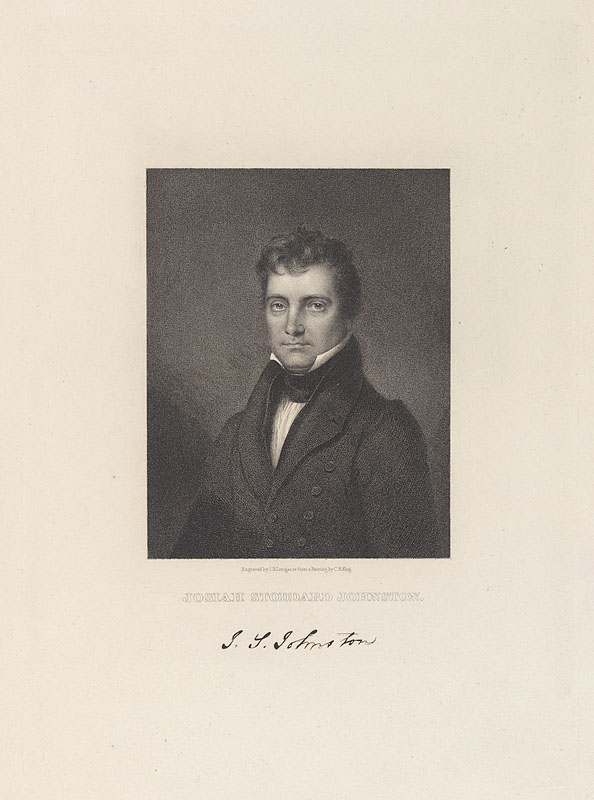

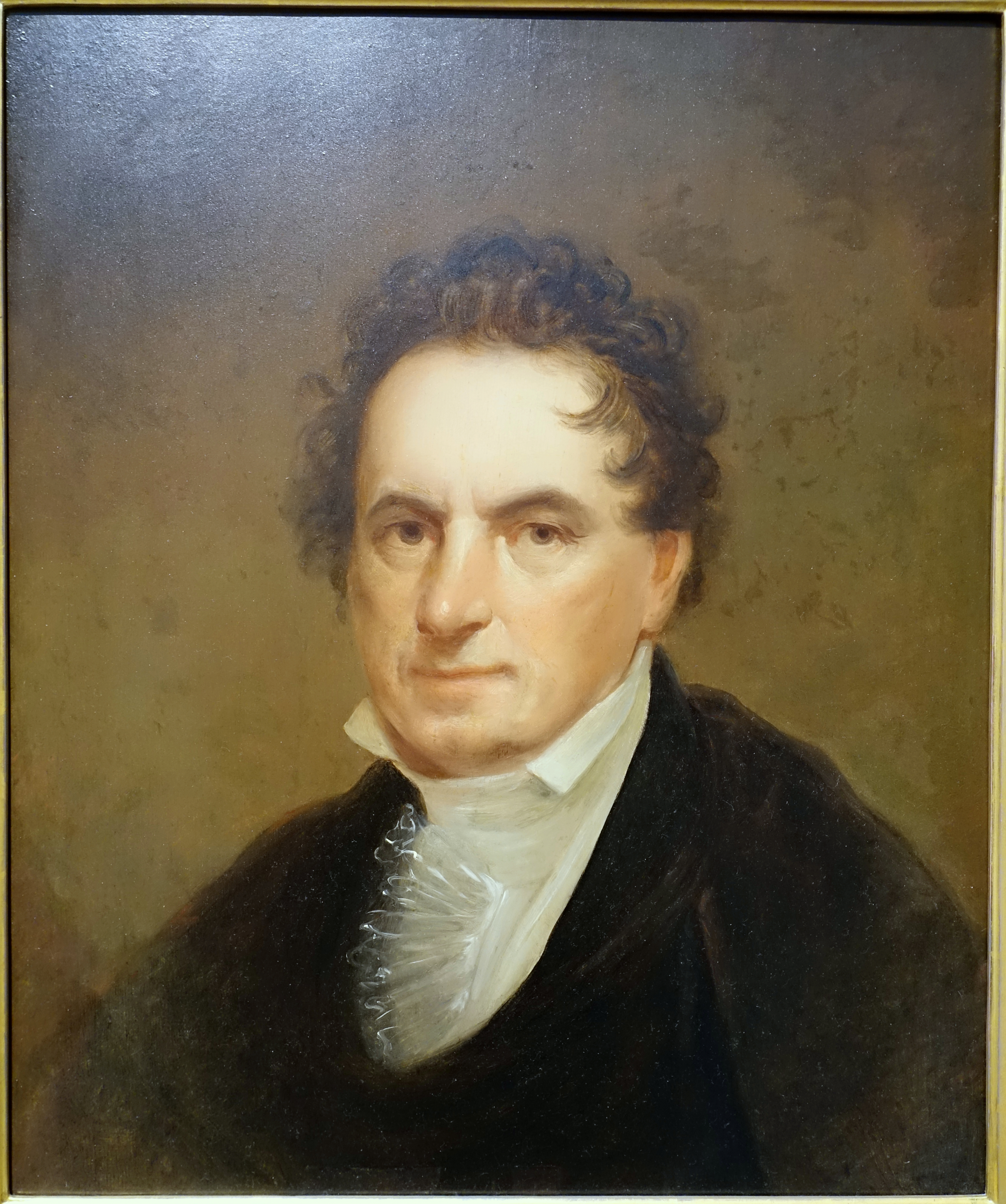
Candidate	Josiah S. Johnston	Edward Livingston
Party	Democratic-Republican	Democratic-Republican
Alliance	Anti-Jacksonian	Jacksonian
Legislative vote	29	27
Percentage	51.8%	48.2%

Incumbent Democratic-Republican James Brown resigned on December 10, 1823, to become the U.S. Minister to France. A special election was held on January 15, 1824. Both candidates were Democratic-Republicans but were split over loyalties to Andrew Jackson. The Anti-Jacksonian, former congressman Josiah S. Johnston narrowly defeated Jacksonian congressman Edward Livingston.

== Maryland ==
1825 United States Senate election in Maryland
- January 25, 1825

80 members of the Maryland General Assembly
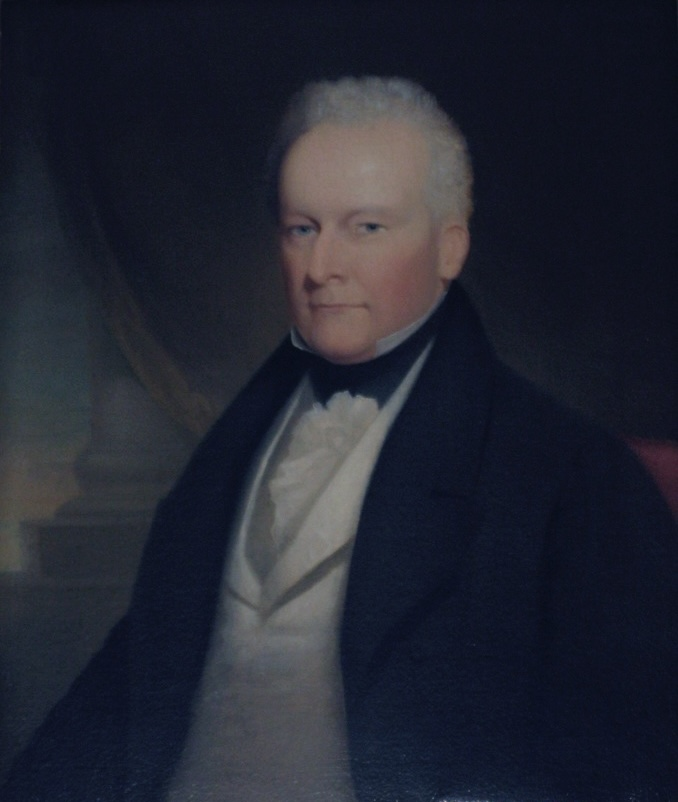

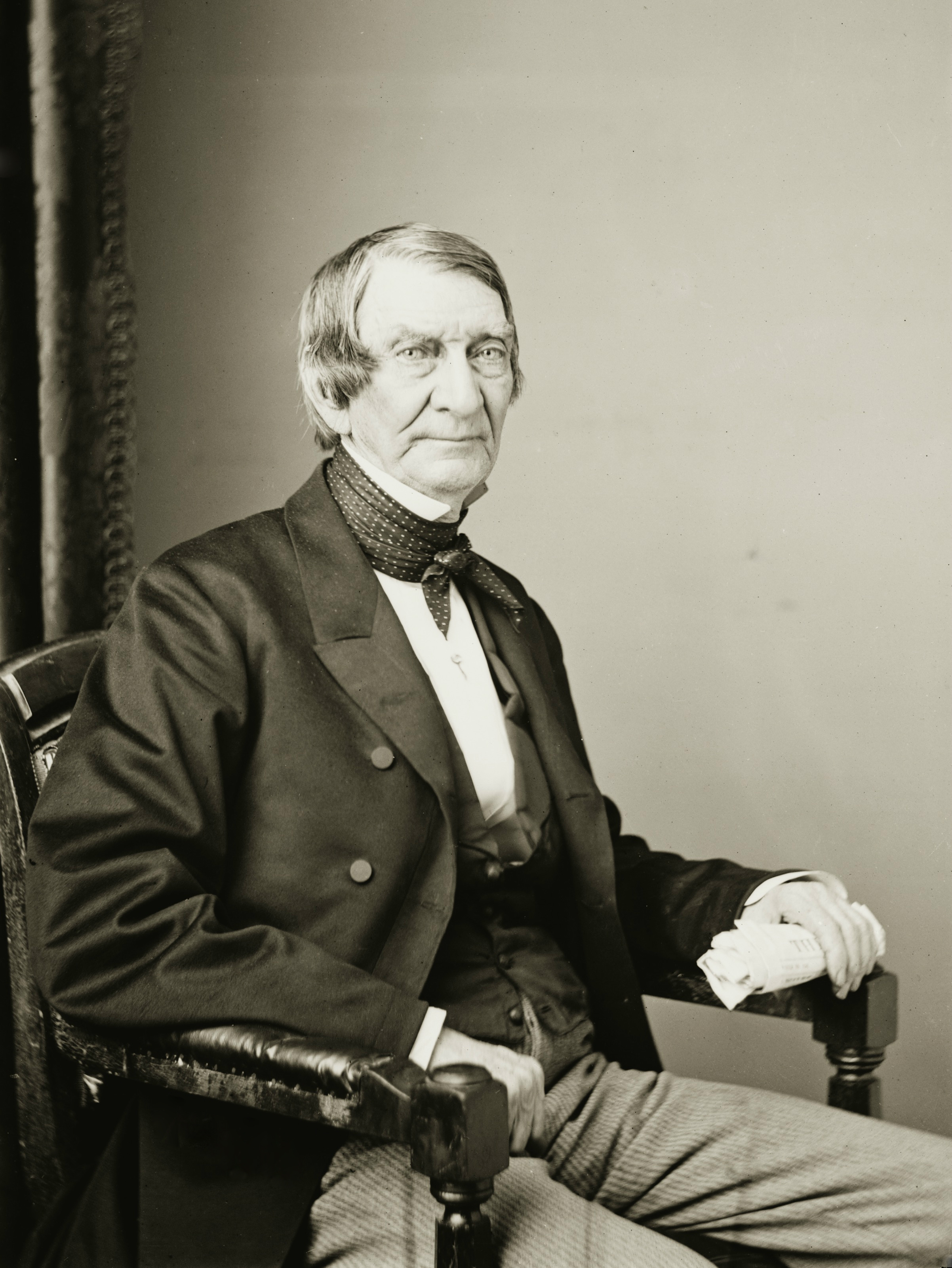
Candidate	Edward Lloyd	Ezekiel F. Chambers
Party	Federalist	National Republican
Legislative vote	54	34
Percentage	60.67%	38.20%

Edward Lloyd won election over Ezekiel F. Chambers by a margin of 22.47%, or 20 votes, for the Class 3 seat.

== Ohio ==
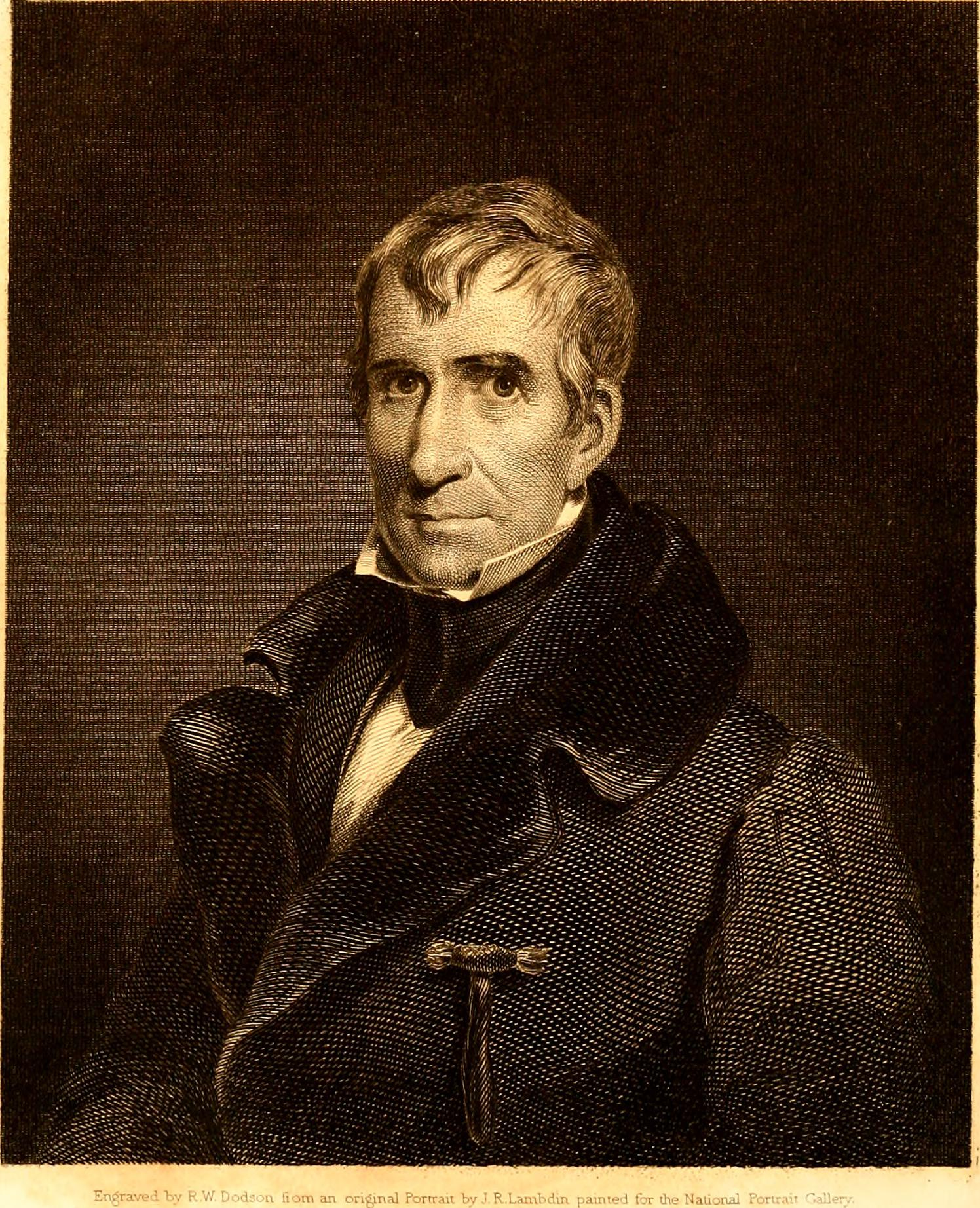
William Henry Harrison

Incumbent Democratic-Republican Jacksonian Ethan Allen Brown was elected in an 1822 special election following the death of William A. Trimble. He was defeated for reelection by William Henry Harrison, a former congressman and war hero, who was an Anti-Jacksonian.

== See also ==
- 1824 United States elections
  - 1824–25 United States House of Representatives elections
- 18th United States Congress
- 19th United States Congress
