= 1828 United States elections =

- ← 1826 1827 1828 1829 1830 → Presidential election year
- Incumbent president: ▌John Quincy Adams (N)
- Next Congress: 21st

Presidential election
- Partisan control: Democratic gain
- Popular vote margin: Democratic +12.4%
- Electoral vote
- Andrew Jackson (D): 178
- John Quincy Adams (NR): 83
- 1828 presidential election results. Blue denotes states won by Jackson, light yellow denotes state won by Adams. Numbers indicate the number of electoral votes allotted to each state.

Senate elections
- Overall control: Democratic hold
- Seats contested: 16 of 48 seats
- Net seat change: Anti-Jacksonian +1

House elections
- Overall control: Democratic hold
- Seats contested: All 213 voting members
- Net seat change: Democratic +23

Elections for the 21st United States Congress, were held in 1828 and 1829. It marked the beginning of the Second Party System, and the definitive split of the Democratic-Republican Party into the Democratic Party (organized around Andrew Jackson) and the National Republican Party (organized around John Quincy Adams and opponents of Jackson). While the Democrats cultivated strong local organizations, the National Republicans relied on a clear national platform of high tariffs and internal improvements. Political scientists such as V.O. Key Jr. consider this election to be a realigning election, while political scientists such as James Reichley instead see the election as a continuation of the Democratic-Republican tradition. Additionally, this election saw the Anti-Masonic Party win a small number of seats in the House, becoming the first third party to gain representation in Congress.

== The election's events ==
In a re-match of the 1824 presidential election, Democratic General Andrew Jackson won a large victory over incumbent National Republican President John Quincy Adams. Adams again won New England, but Jackson took most of the rest of the country. Jackson was the first successful presidential candidate who had not served as secretary of state or vice president in the preceding administration (aside from George Washington). Adams was the first president to lose re-election since his father, John Adams, lost re-election in 1800. John C. Calhoun was re-elected vice president, making him the second and last vice president to serve under two different presidents. Jackson's election as president marked the start of Jacksonian democracy, and an ongoing expansion in right to vote saw a dramatic increase in the size of the electorate.

In the House, Democrats won several seats, increasing their majority. The Anti-Masonic Party won a small number of seats, gaining representation in Congress for the first time.

In the Senate, opponents of Jackson won minor gains, but Democrats retained control of the chamber.

== See also ==
- 1828 United States presidential election
- 1828–29 United States House of Representatives elections
- 1828–29 United States Senate elections
