= 1830 United States Senate election in Pennsylvania =

The 1830 United States Senate election in Pennsylvania was held on from December 14 to 16, 1830. William Wilkins was elected by the Pennsylvania General Assembly to the United States Senate.

== Results ==
Incumbent National Republican William Marks, who was elected in 1825, was not a candidate for re-election to another term. The Pennsylvania General Assembly, consisting of the House of Representatives and the Senate, convened on December 14, 1830, to elect a new senator to fill the term beginning on March 4, 1831. Twenty-one ballots were recorded over the next three days. The results of the twenty-first and final ballot of both houses combined are as follows:

State legislature results
Party	Candidate	Votes	%
Democratic	William Wilkins	72	54.55
Democratic	James S. Stevenson	31	23.48
Democratic	Richard Coulter	11	8.33
Anti-Masonic	Harmar Denny	10	7.58
Democratic	George M. Dallas	5	3.79
N/A	Other	1	0.76
N/A	Not voting	2	1.52
Totals		132	100.00%

Preceded by 1824–25	Pennsylvania U.S. Senate election (Class III); 1830	Succeeded by 1834
