= James Fenner =

American politician (1771–1846)

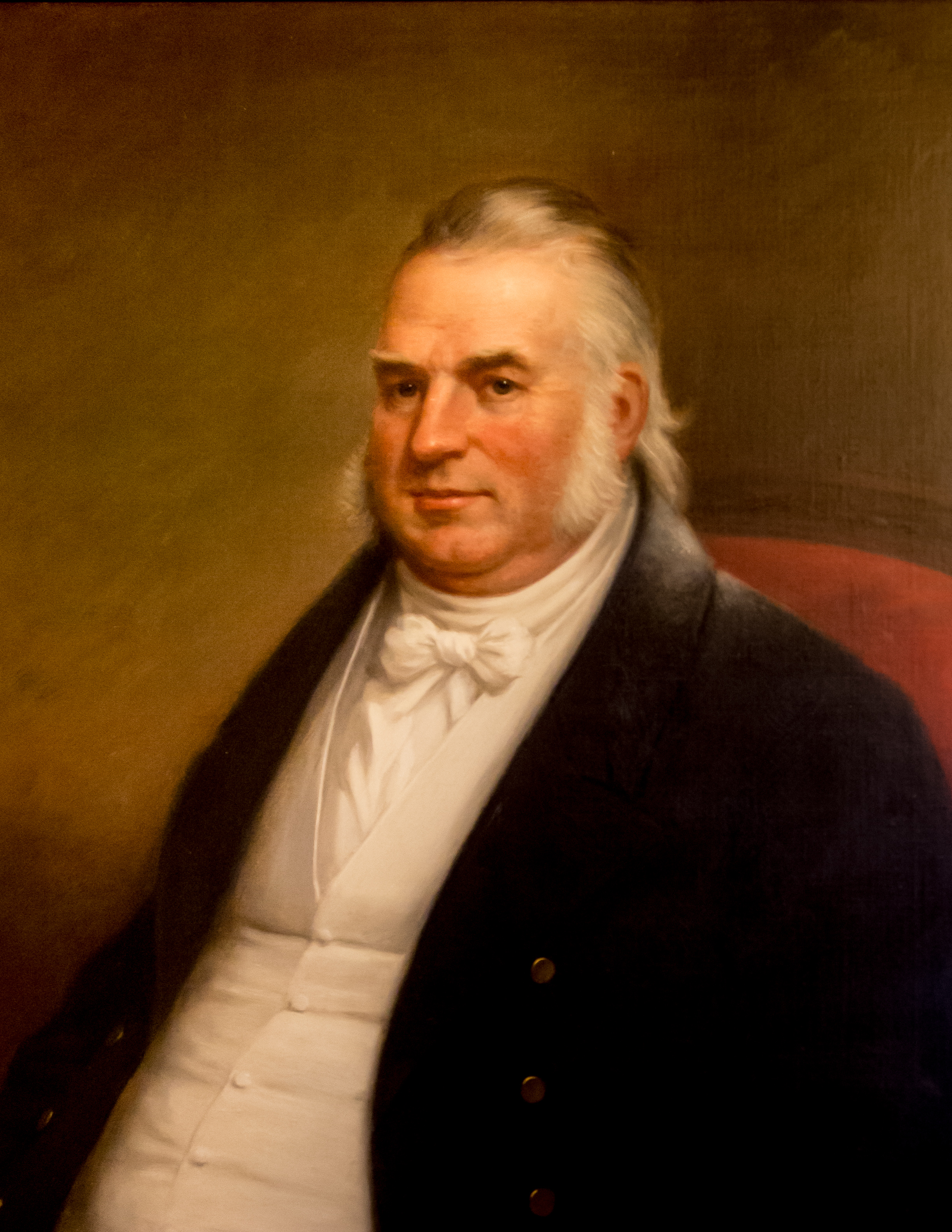
- Official Rhode Island State House portrait by James Sullivan Lincoln

7th, 12th, and 17th Governor of Rhode Island
- In office May 6, 1807 – May 1, 1811
- Lieutenant: Constant Taber; Simeon Martin; Isaac Wilbour
- Preceded by: Isaac Wilbour
- Succeeded by: William Jones
- In office May 5, 1824 – May 4, 1831
- Lieutenant: Charles Collins
- Preceded by: William C. Gibbs
- Succeeded by: Lemuel H. Arnold
- In office May 2, 1843 – May 6, 1845
- Lieutenant: Byron Diman
- Preceded by: Samuel Ward King
- Succeeded by: Charles Jackson

United States Senator from Rhode Island
- In office March 4, 1805 – September 1807
- Preceded by: Christopher Ellery
- Succeeded by: Elisha Mathewson

33rd Chief Justice of the Rhode Island Supreme Court
- In office 1819–1819
- Preceded by: Tristam Burges
- Succeeded by: Isaac Wilbour

Personal details
- Born: January 22, 1771 Providence, Rhode Island, Colony of Rhode Island, British America (now Rhode Island, U.S.)
- Died: April 17, 1846 (aged 75) Providence, Rhode Island, U.S.
- Party: Democratic-Republican
- Other political affiliations: Law and Order

James Fenner (January 22, 1771 – April 17, 1846) was an American politician who served as a United States senator as well as the 7th, 12th and 17th governor of Rhode Island (on three occasions). He was the son of Arthur Fenner, the fourth governor of Rhode Island.

== Biography ==
Coat of Arms of Arthur Fenner

Fenner was born in Providence in the Colony of Rhode Island and Providence Plantations. He graduated from Brown University in 1789, and was married to Sarah Whipple Jenckes (his first cousin, once removed) on November 17, 1792. He served as United States senator from 1805 to 1807, then gave up his senatorship to become Governor of Rhode Island, two years after his father died in office. Fenner served as governor from 1807 to 1811, from 1824 to 1831, and from 1843 to 1845. Fenner was elected to his first two terms as a Democratic-Republican and as his third term as a member of the Law and Order Party of Rhode Island. In his final term, Fenner became the first governor to serve under the Rhode Island Constitution, adopted in 1842.

Fenner died in his mansion "What Cheer" in 1846, and was interred in the North Burial Ground in Providence.

Fenner had four children with his wife, Sarah Jenckes:

- Almira Theodosia (January 17, 1793 – October 10, 1872)
- Sarah
- Freelove (ca. 1799 – August 2, 1817)
- Arthur (ca. 1810 – March 8, 1832)

Party political offices
Preceded by Peleg Arnold	Democratic-Republican Party nominee for Governor of Rhode Island; 1807, 1808, 1809, 1810, 1811, 1812	Vacant Title next held by Peleg Arnold
First	Democratic nominee for Governor of Rhode Island; 1824, 1825, 1826, 1827, 1828, 1829, 1830, 1831, 1832	Succeeded by John Brown Francis
First	Law and Order nominee for Governor of Rhode Island; 1843, 1844, 1845	Succeeded by Byron Diman
Political offices
Preceded by Isaac Wilbour	Governor of Rhode Island; 1807–1811	Succeeded by William Jones
Preceded by William C. Gibbs	Governor of Rhode Island; 1824–1831	Succeeded by Lemuel H. Arnold
Preceded by Samuel Ward King	Governor of Rhode Island; 1843–1845	Succeeded by Charles Jackson
U.S. Senate
Preceded by Christopher Ellery	U.S. senator (Class 2) from Rhode Island; 1805–1807; Served alongside: Benjamin Howland	Succeeded by Elisha Mathewson
