= Peter V. Daniel =

US Supreme Court justice from 1842 to 1860

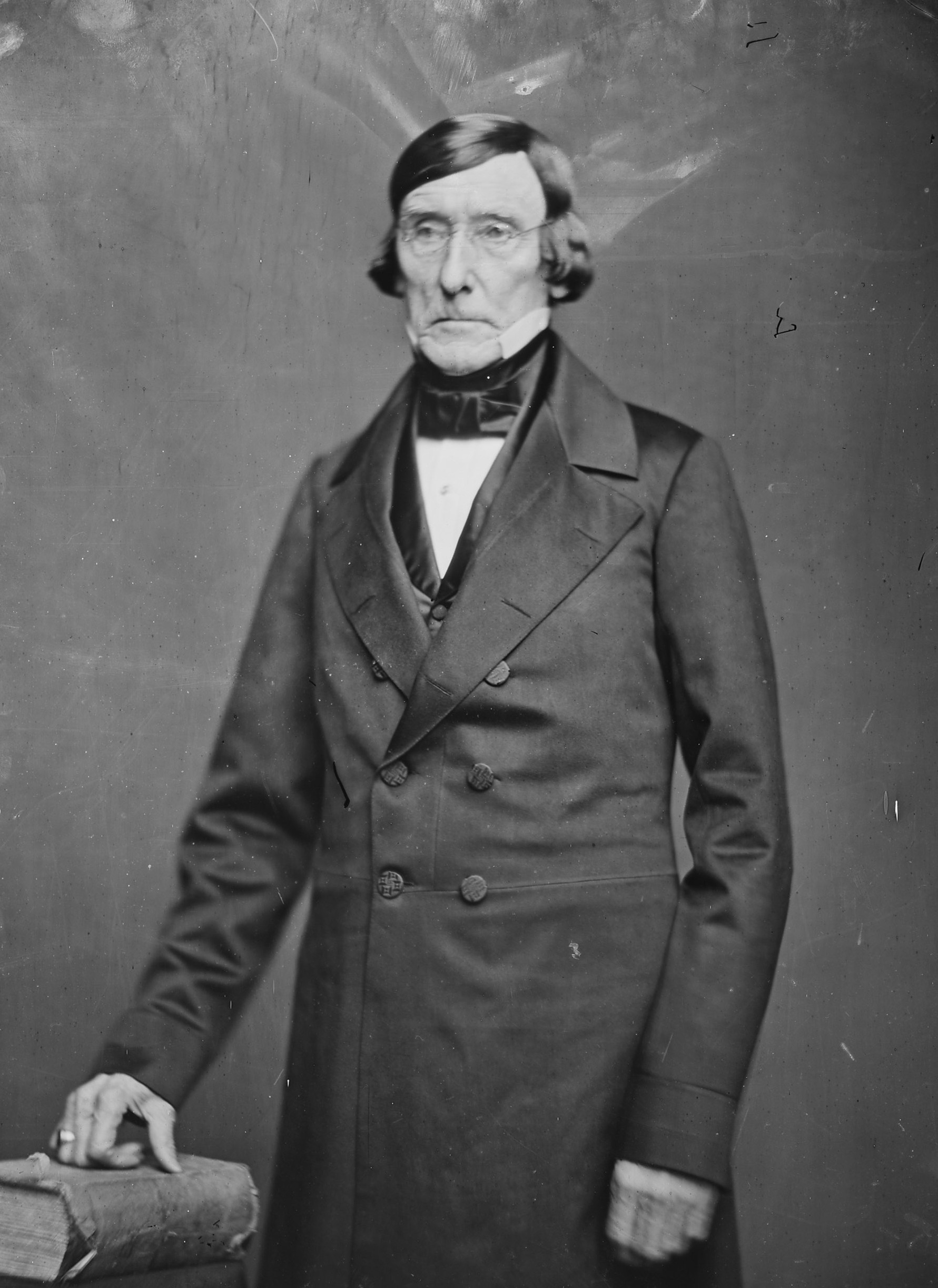
- Daniel, c. 1860

Associate Justice of the Supreme Court of the United States
- In office January 10, 1842 – May 31, 1860
- Nominated by: Martin Van Buren
- Preceded by: Philip P. Barbour
- Succeeded by: Samuel Freeman Miller

Judge of the United States District Court for the Eastern District of Virginia
- In office April 19, 1836 – March 3, 1841
- Nominated by: Andrew Jackson
- Preceded by: Philip P. Barbour
- Succeeded by: John Mason

Member of the Virginia House of Delegates from Stafford County
- In office December 5, 1808 – December 3, 1810 Serving with John Moncure, William Brent
- Preceded by: John T. Brooke
- Succeeded by: Charles Julian

Personal details
- Born: April 24, 1784 Stafford County, Virginia, U.S.
- Died: May 31, 1860 (aged 76) Richmond, Virginia, U.S.
- Party: Democratic
- Spouses: Lucy Randolph (m. 1808; died 1847) Elizabeth Harris (m. 1850; died 1857)
- Children: 5
- Education: Princeton University

Peter Vivian Daniel (April 24, 1784 – May 31, 1860) was an American jurist who served as an associate justice of the Supreme Court of the United States.

== Early life and education ==
Peter Vivian Daniel was born in 1784 at "Crow's Nest", a plantation in Stafford County, Virginia, to the former Frances Moncure (of the First Families of Virginia) and her plantation-owning husband Travers Daniel, who began serving the first of several terms in the Virginia House of Delegates in 1790. This boy was named to honor his paternal grandfather. He was descended from Raleigh Travers, who had twice served in the House of Burgesses representing Lancaster County, Virginia before resigning in 1670.

Private tutors educated Daniel at home before he entered the College of New Jersey (now Princeton) at the age of 18. He returned to Virginia after one year and studied law under former Virginia governor and U.S. attorney general Edmund Randolph.

== Personal life ==
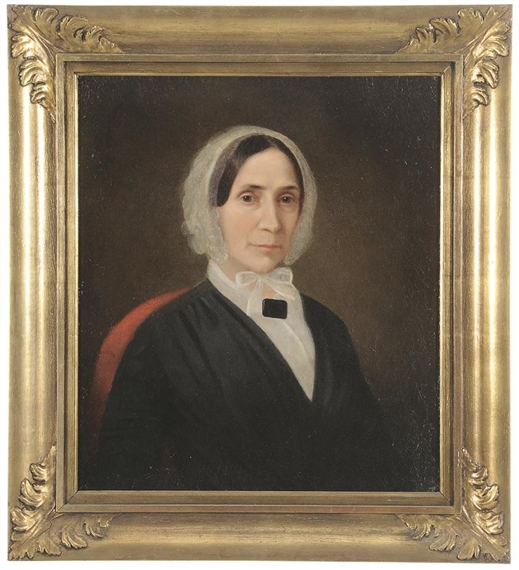
Lucy Nelson Randolph Daniel (1788–1847), portrait by William Garl Brown

Daniel married Randolph's daughter, Lucy, in 1811, after moving to Richmond. Before her death in November 1847, they had Peter Vivian Daniel Jr. (1818–1889) and daughters Elizabeth Randolph Daniel (1814–1879) and Ann Lewis Moncure (1820–1905). His second wife, the Pennsylvania-born widow Elizabeth Hodgson Harris (1824–1857), died when a lit candle accidentally set her clothing afire, leaving Daniel grief-stricken. Their daughter Mary (1854–1863) barely survived her father, but their son Travers Daniel (1856–1911) did have children.

Throughout his life, Daniel owned slaves, although he did not operate a plantation. In the 1810 and 1820 censuses, he owned five slaves, In the 1830 census, he owned three slaves in Richmond and leased out another five in Henrico County (four males and an elderly woman). In the 1840 census, he owned seven slaves. In the 1850 federal census, his grown lawyer son Peter Daniel Jr. lived at home with his father and unmarried sisters, as well as two white servants, and the family owned five slaves. In the final year of his life, Judge Daniel owned one 65-year-old mulatto man.

== Virginia lawyer and official ==
In 1807 Daniel was admitted to the Virginia bar and began a private legal practice in Falmouth across the Rappahannock River from Fredericksburg. In November 1808, Daniel became involved in a dispute with a Fredericksburg businessman, John Seddon, and both parties agreed to a duel. Since dueling was prohibited in Virginia, the Daniel-Seddon duel was fought in Maryland. Daniel wounded Seddon during the duel, although he himself was unscathed, and Sedden died of his wound shortly after returning to Virginia.

The duel did not crimp Daniel's career. In 1809, Stafford County voters elected him to the Virginia House of Delegates, and re-elected him once, so he served in that part-time position first alongside his relative John Moncure and then with William Brent. Daniel championed states' rights principles embodied in the Virginia and Kentucky Resolutions of 1798, and promoted agrarian issues and strict construction of the federal Constitution.

Daniel moved to Richmond by 1810. In 1812, the General Assembly elected him to the advisory Virginia Council of State. He served until 1835, three years after adoption of the Virginia Constitution of 1832. In 1818, Daniel was elected Lieutenant Governor of Virginia, retaining his Council seat. During the 1830s, he was a member of the Richmond Junto, a powerful group of the Jacksonian Democrats and slaveholders, and strongly supported both Andrew Jackson and Martin Van Buren. Daniel was described as a "personal friend" of Jackson. In 1830, Daniel ran unsuccessfully for governor of Virginia.

== Judicial service ==
=== U.S. District Court ===
On April 6, 1836, President Jackson nominated Daniel to a seat on the United States District Court for the Eastern District of Virginia vacated by Philip P. Barbour, who had been appointed to the U.S. Supreme Court. The United States Senate confirmed the appointment on April 19, 1836, and Daniel received his commission the same day. While Daniel sat on the District Court, he opposed the practice of District Court Justices also riding the Circuit Court system.

=== U.S. Supreme Court ===
On February 26, 1841, outgoing President Martin Van Buren, a Democrat, nominated Daniel as an associate justice of the Supreme Court, again to succeed Barbour (who had died). As Daniel's nomination to the Court was made during the final days of Van Buren's term, and with his elected successor William Henry Harrison of the Whig party due to take office on March 4, 1841, Senate Whigs opposed confirmation. Nonetheless, Daniel was confirmed by a wide 25–5 margin on March 2, 1841. His service on the Supreme Court began on January 10, 1842, and ended May 31, 1860, upon his death.

Daniel was the most frequent dissenter in the Taney Court with nearly two-thirds of his opinions going against the majority. Of the seventy-four opinions he wrote, fifty were dissents. His political views were reactionary and made the other justices around him seem moderate in comparison. He was arguably the strongest supporter of slavery on the Taney Court, and he also disagreed with the amount of power that was given to the federal government. He wrote a concurrence in Prigg v. Pennsylvania (1842) which upheld the Fugitive Slave Act of 1793. Daniel wrote:

Concurring entirely, as I do, with the majority of the court, in the conclusions they have reached relative to the effect and validity of the statute of Pennsylvania now under review, it is with unfeigned regret that I am constrained to dissent from some of the principles and reasonings which that majority, in passing to our common conclusions, have believed themselves called on to affirm.

He also joined the majority in Jones v. Van Zandt (1847). Daniel wrote a concurring opinion a decade later in Dred Scott v. Sandford, to state that "the African negro race never have been acknowledged as belonging to the family of nations."

Justice Daniel authored only one significant opinion, West River Bridge Co. v. Dix, 47 U.S. (6 How.) 507 (1848), in his eighteen years on the nation's highest court.

== Death ==
Daniel died on May 31, 1860, in Richmond, Virginia at the age of 76, leaving behind five children and having survived two wives. He was buried at Hollywood Cemetery beside his first wife, and soon joined by his daughter Mary, by his second wife, and eventually by his namesake son. Although his son Peter V. Daniel Jr. became a lawyer, his political heir may have been a boy for whom he had served as guardian and then mentored as a lawyer. Raleigh Travers Daniel won election as Henrico County's Commonwealth Attorney several times in the 1830s and 1840s as well as during the Civil War, helped found the Conservative Party and won election as Virginia's attorney general in 1873.

== See also ==
- List of justices of the Supreme Court of the United States

Legal offices
Preceded by Philip P. Barbour	Judge of the United States District Court for the Eastern District of Virginia; 1836–1841	Succeeded by John Mason
Preceded by Philip P. Barbour	Associate Justice of the Supreme Court of the United States; 1842–1860	Succeeded by Samuel Miller
