= 1824 Rhode Island gubernatorial election =

- April 21, 1824
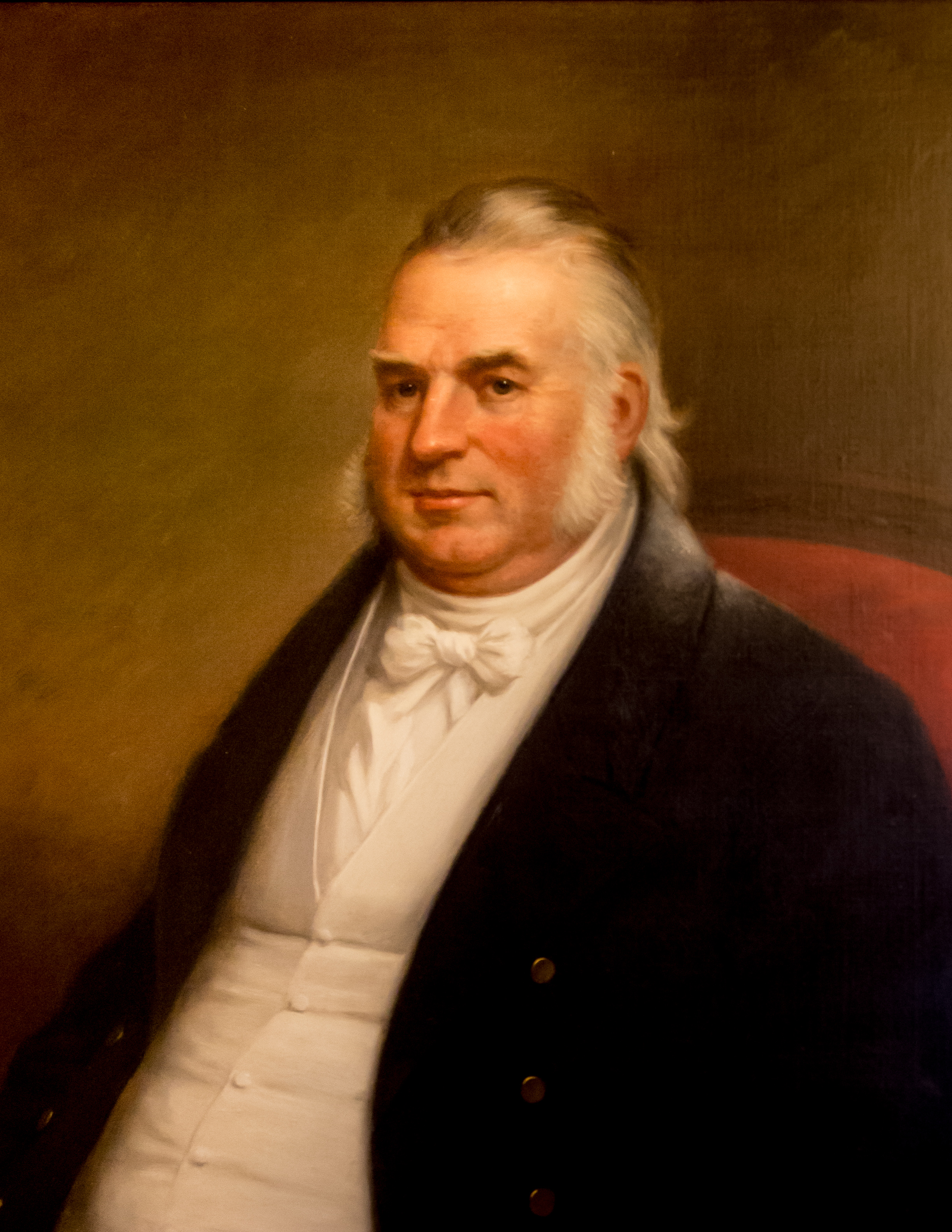

Nominee	James Fenner	Wheeler Marion
Party	Democratic-Republican	Democratic-Republican
Popular vote	2,151	594
Percentage	78.05%	21.55%
- County results Fenner: 50–60% 70–80% 80–90%
Governor before election
William C. Gibbs
Democratic-Republican
Elected Governor
James Fenner
Democratic-Republican

The 1824 Rhode Island gubernatorial election was an election held on April 21, 1824, to elect the governor of Rhode Island. James Fenner, the Jackson Republican nominee, beat Wheeler Marion, the Democratic Republican candidate, with 78.05% of the vote.

== General election ==
=== Candidates ===
- James Fenner, Governor of Rhode Island 1807–1811.
- Wheeler Marion, Democratic-Republican candidate.

=== Results ===
1824 Rhode Island gubernatorial election
Party	Candidate	Votes	%	±%
Democratic-Republican	James Fenner	2,151	78.05%	
Democratic-Republican	Wheeler Marion	594	21.55%	
Independent	Write-in candidates	11	0.40%	
Majority		1,557	56.49%	
Democratic-Republican hold		Swing		
