= 1828 Virginia gubernatorial election =

- December 6, 1828
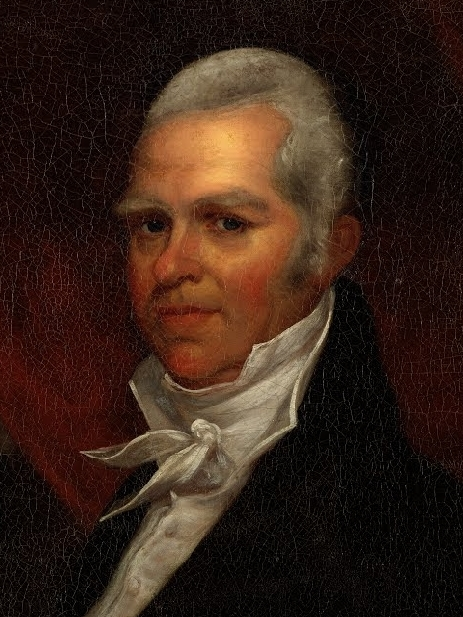
Nominee	William Branch Giles
Party	Jacksonian
1st ballot	147
Governor before election
William Branch Giles
Jacksonian
Elected Governor
William Branch Giles
Jacksonian (Note: Giles's biographer says that in 1825, Giles "had joined the great party in Virginia bent on defeating Adams." Contemporary sources that discuss Giles's candidacy for re-election refer to him as the candidate of the Jackson Party. Sobel and Raimo list Giles as a Democrat, while Kallenbach and Kallenbach list him as a Jeffersonian Republican.)

A gubernatorial election was held in Virginia on December 6, 1828. The Jacksonian incumbent governor of Virginia William Branch Giles was re-elected.

The election was conducted by the Virginia General Assembly in joint session. Giles was considered vulnerable and faced bipartisan opposition in the legislature, but the difficulty of finding a challenger acceptable to all factions hamstrung the efforts to defeat his re-election. A motion to postpone the election until January 10, 1829, was defeated, and the house proceeded to nominations. William O. Goode nominated Giles for re-election. William H. Terrill nominated the U.S. representative from Virginia's 20th congressional district John Floyd, but withdrew the nomination after Floyd's refusal to become a candidate was announced. Giles was elected with a majority on the first ballot.

The expiration of Giles's term was discussed prior to voting in connection with the date of the election. Giles had previously won the 1827 Virginia gubernatorial special election to succeed John Tyler, who resigned following his election to the United States Senate. Terrill claimed that the legislature had elected Giles for a new one-year term from the date of the special election, and therefore that his current term would not expire until February 10, 1829; however, Thomas Miller replied that Giles had been elected to complete Tyler's unexpired term, and subsequently re-elected for a term ending December 11, 1828. Giles ultimately left office on March 4, 1830, three years from the date of Tyler's resignation.

== General election ==
1828 Virginia gubernatorial election
Party	Candidate	First ballot	
Party	Candidate	Count	Percent
Jacksonian	William Branch Giles (incumbent)	147	66.52
Others		65	29.41
Blank		9	4.07
Total		221	100.00

== Bibliography ==
- Anderson, Dice Robbins (1914). William Branch Giles: A Study in the Politics of Virginia and the Nation from 1790 to 1830. Menasha, WI: George Banta Publishing Company.
- Kallenbach, Joseph E.; Kallenbach, Jessamine S. (1977). American State Governors, 1776–1976. Vol. 1. Dobbs Ferry, NY: Oceana Publications.
- Sobel, Robert; Raimo, John (1978). Biographical Directory of the Governors of the United States 1789–1978. Vol. 4. Westport, CT: Meckler Books.
- Virginia (1828). Journal of the Senate [...]. Richmond.
