= 1828 Rhode Island gubernatorial election =

- April 16, 1828
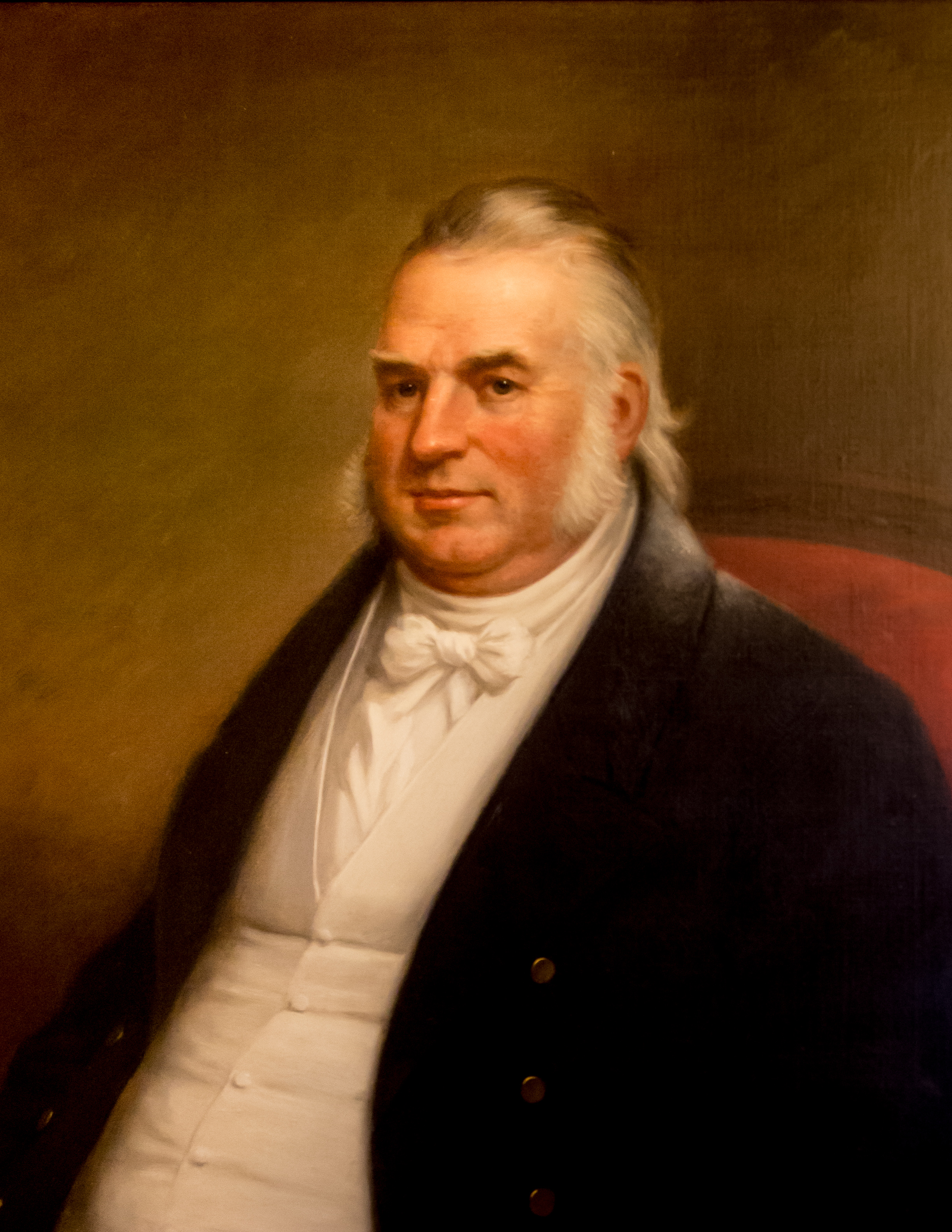
Nominee	James Fenner
Party	Democratic-Republican
Popular vote	4,233
Percentage	100.00%
- County results Fenner: 90–100%
Governor before election
James Fenner
Democratic-Republican
Elected Governor
James Fenner
Democratic-Republican

The 1828 Rhode Island gubernatorial election was an uncontested election held on April 16, 1828, to elect the governor of Rhode Island. James Fenner, the incumbent governor and Jackson Republican nominee, was the only candidate and so won with 100% of the vote. Jackson Republicans were a faction of the Democratic-Republican Party which favoured Andrew Jackson over John Quincy Adams for president.

== General election ==
=== Candidates ===
- James Fenner, Governor since 1824.

=== Results ===
1828 Rhode Island gubernatorial election
Party	Candidate	Votes	%	±%
Democratic-Republican	James Fenner (incumbent)	4,233	100.00%	
Majority		4,233	100.00%	
Democratic-Republican hold		Swing		
