= 1812 United States Senate election in Pennsylvania =

The 1812 United States Senate election in Pennsylvania was held on December 8, 1812. Abner Lacock was elected by the Pennsylvania General Assembly to the United States Senate.

== Results ==
Incumbent Democratic-Republican Andrew Gregg, who was elected in 1806, was not a candidate for re-election to another term. The Pennsylvania General Assembly, consisting of the House of Representatives and the Senate, convened on December 8, 1812, to elect a new senator to fill the term beginning on March 4, 1813. The results of the vote of both houses combined are as follows:

State legislature results
Party	Candidate	Votes	%
Democratic-Republican	Abner Lacock	63	50.00
Democratic-Republican	Daniel Montgomery, Jr.	26	20.63
Independent	James Brady	22	17.46
Democratic-Republican	Isaac Weaver	6	4.76
N/A	Not voting	9	7.14
Totals		126	100.00

Preceded by 1806	Pennsylvania U.S. Senate election (Class III); 1812	Succeeded by 1818
