= 1844 Rhode Island gubernatorial election =

- April 3, 1844
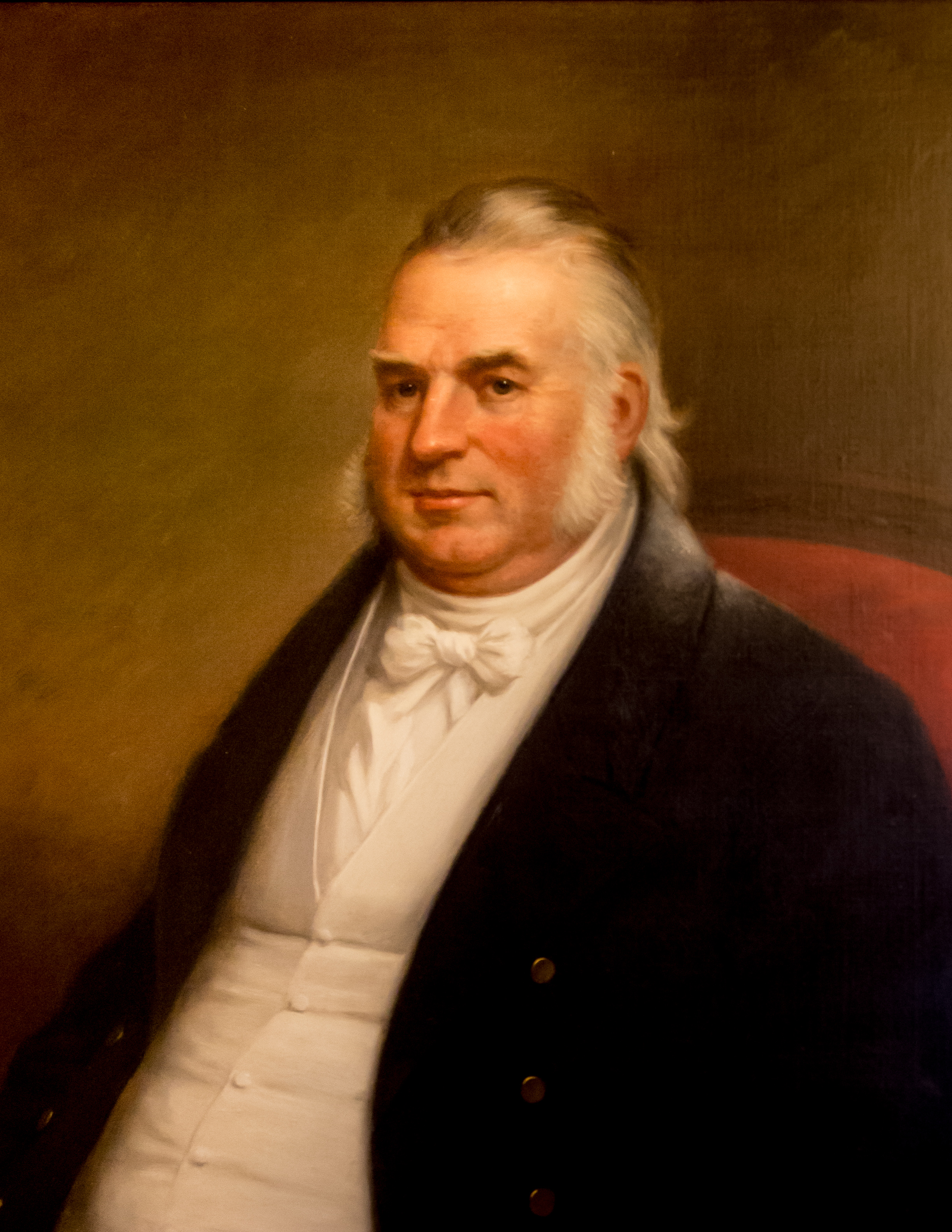
Nominee	James Fenner
Party	Law and Order
Popular vote	5,560
Percentage	96.39%
- County results Fenner: 90–100%
Governor before election
James Fenner
Law and Order
Elected Governor
James Fenner
Law and Order

The 1844 Rhode Island gubernatorial election was held on April 3, 1844.

Incumbent Law and Order Governor James Fenner won re-election without opposition.

== General election ==
=== Candidates ===
- James Fenner, Law and Order, incumbent governor

=== Results ===
1844 Rhode Island gubernatorial election
Party	Candidate	Votes	%	±%
Law and Order	James Fenner (incumbent)	5,560	96.39%	
Scattering		208	3.61%	
Majority		5,352	92.79%	
Turnout		5,768		
Law and Order hold		Swing		
