= 1829 Rhode Island gubernatorial election =

- April 15, 1829
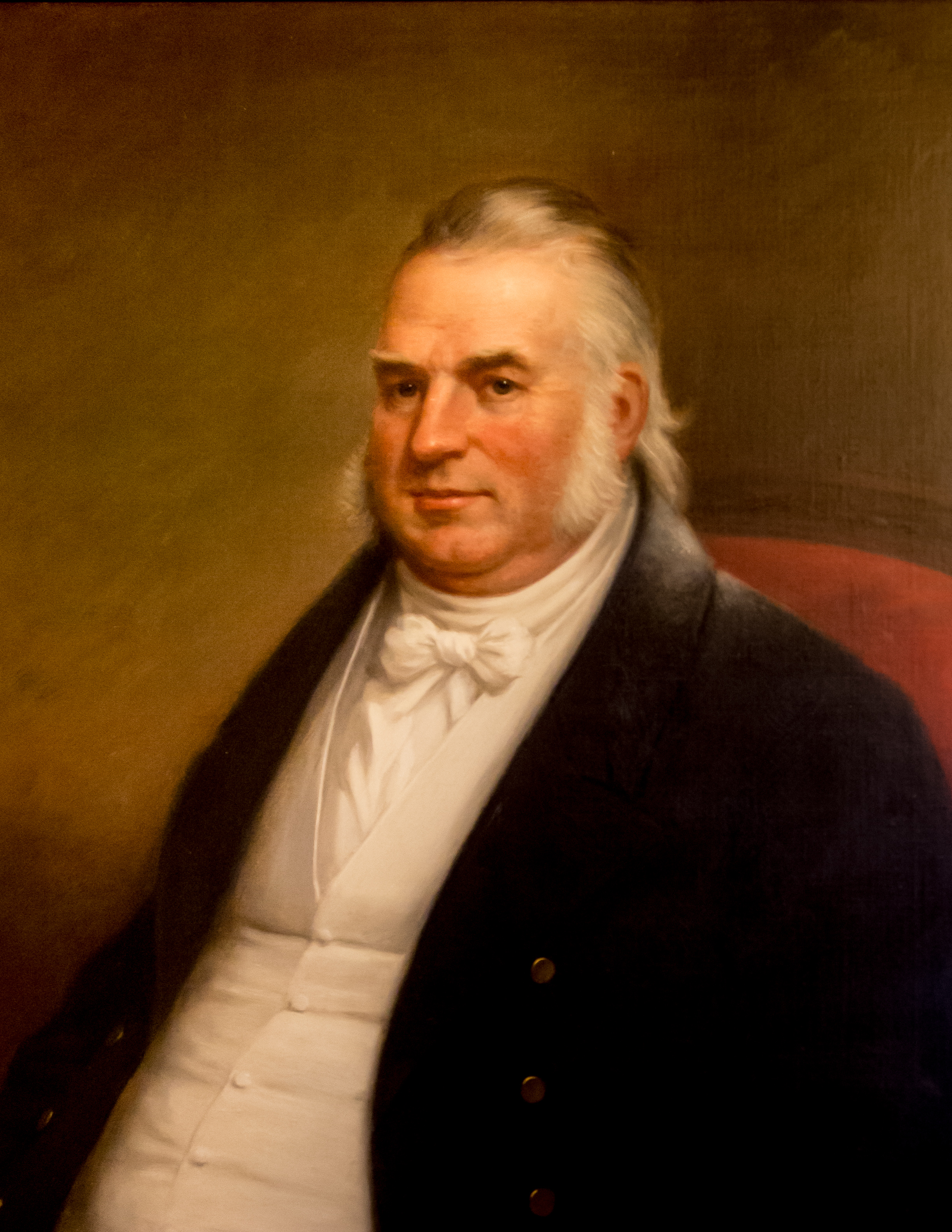
Nominee	James Fenner
Party	Jacksonian
Popular vote	3,584
Percentage	100.00%
- County results Fenner: 90–100%
Governor before election
James Fenner
Democratic-Republican
Elected Governor
James Fenner
Jacksonian

The 1829 Rhode Island gubernatorial election was an uncontested election held on April 15, 1829, to elect the governor of Rhode Island. James Fenner, the incumbent governor and Jacksonian Party nominee, was the only candidate and so won with 100% of the vote.

== General election ==
=== Candidates ===
- James Fenner, Governor since 1824.

=== Results ===
1829 Rhode Island gubernatorial election
Party	Candidate	Votes	%	±%
Jacksonian	James Fenner (incumbent)	3,584	100.00%	
Majority		3,584	100.00%	
Jacksonian hold		Swing		
