= 1825 Virginia gubernatorial election =

- December 10, 1825
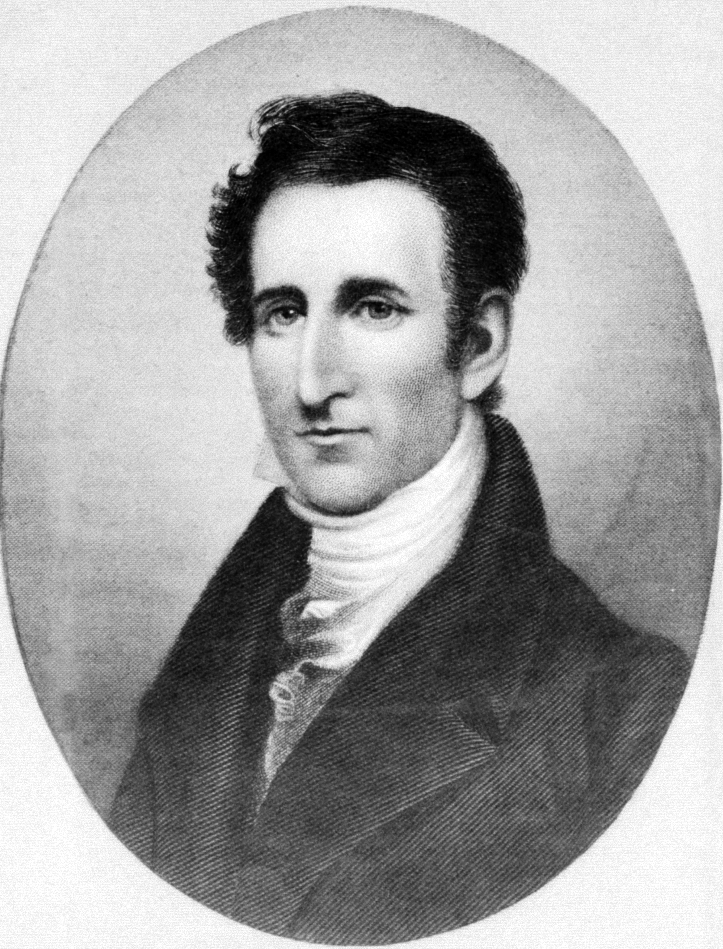

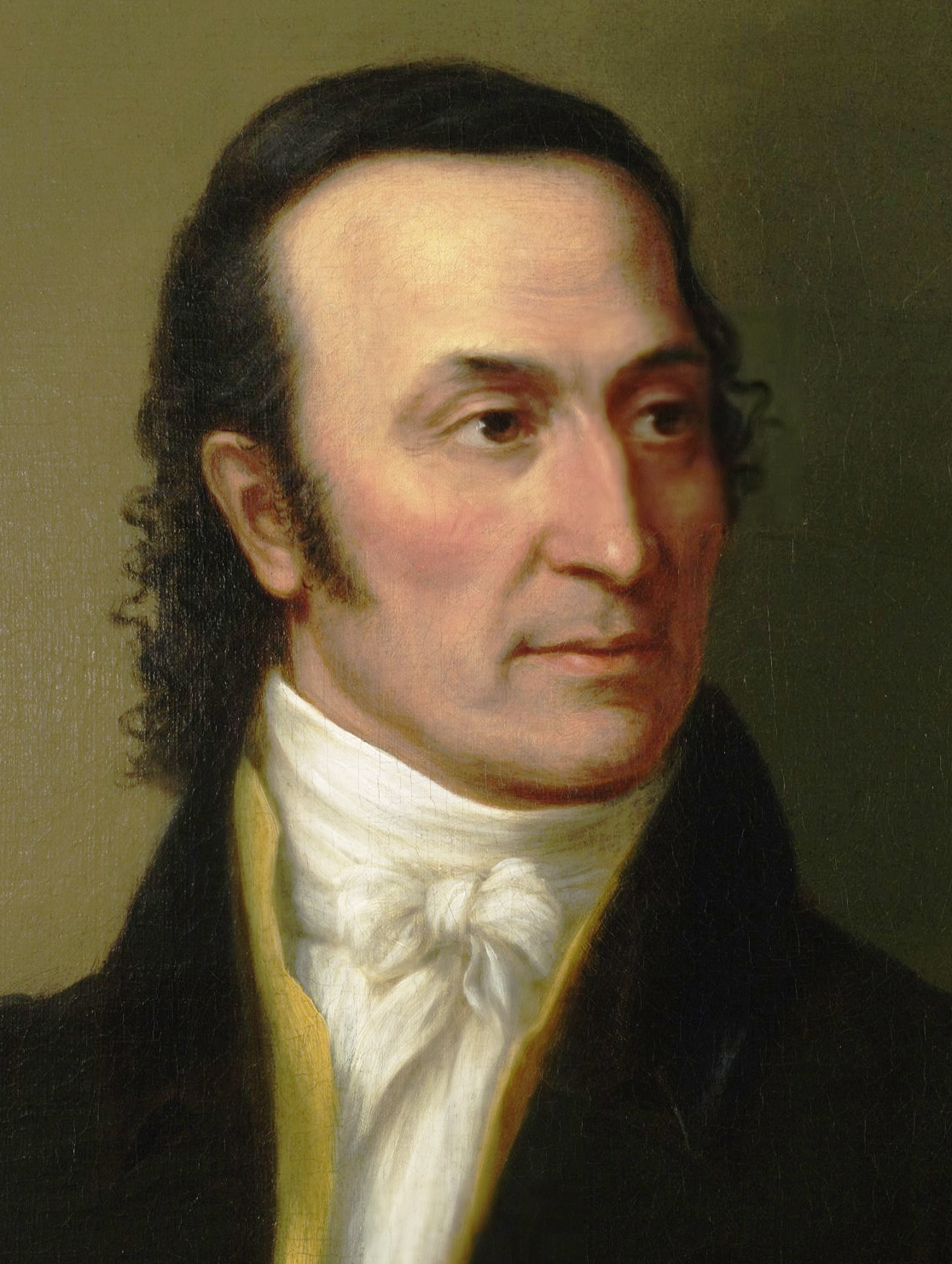
Nominee	John Tyler	John Floyd
1st ballot	131	81
Governor before election
James Pleasants
Democratic-Republican
Elected Governor
John Tyler
Democratic-Republican (Note: Official records published by the Richmond, Virginia Enquirer and Alexandria, Virginia Phenix Gazette do not list parties for this election. Chitwood states that Tyler as governor "did not have behind him in the legislature a dominant and well-disciplined party;" Sobel and Raimo say that Tyler served in the U.S. House of Representatives as a Democratic-Republican; while Kallenbach and Kallenbach list Tyler as a Jeffersonian Republican during his tenure.)

A gubernatorial election was held in Virginia on December 10, 1825. The member of the Virginia House of Delegates from Charles City County John Tyler defeated the U.S. representative from Virginia's 20th congressional district John Floyd.

The incumbent governor of Virginia James Pleasants was ineligible for re-election due to term limits established by the Constitution of Virginia. The election was conducted by the Virginia General Assembly in joint session. Tyler, a Crawford Republican and a supporter of the congressional nominating caucus, ran without the support of a powerful political party, a circumstance which would later hinder his efficacy as governor. Floyd's nomination was greeted with surprise by several of his allies in the legislature, who had believed the congressman did not intend to offer himself as a candidate. Tyler was elected with a majority on the first ballot.

== General election ==
1825 Virginia gubernatorial special election
Candidate	First ballot	
Candidate	Count	Percent
John Tyler	131	61.21
John Floyd	81	37.85
Others	2	0.93
Total	214	100.00

== Bibliography ==
- Chitwood, Oliver Perry (1964). John Tyler: Champion of the Old South. New York: Russell and Russell.
- Kallenbach, Joseph E.; Kallenbach, Jessamine S. (1977). American State Governors, 1776–1976. Vol. 1. Dobbs Ferry, NY: Oceana Publications.
- Sobel, Robert; Raimo, John (1978). Biographical Directory of the Governors of the United States 1789–1978. Vol. 4. Westport, CT: Meckler Books.
