= December 1825 Boston mayoral election =

Election in Massachusetts, United States

- December 12, 1825
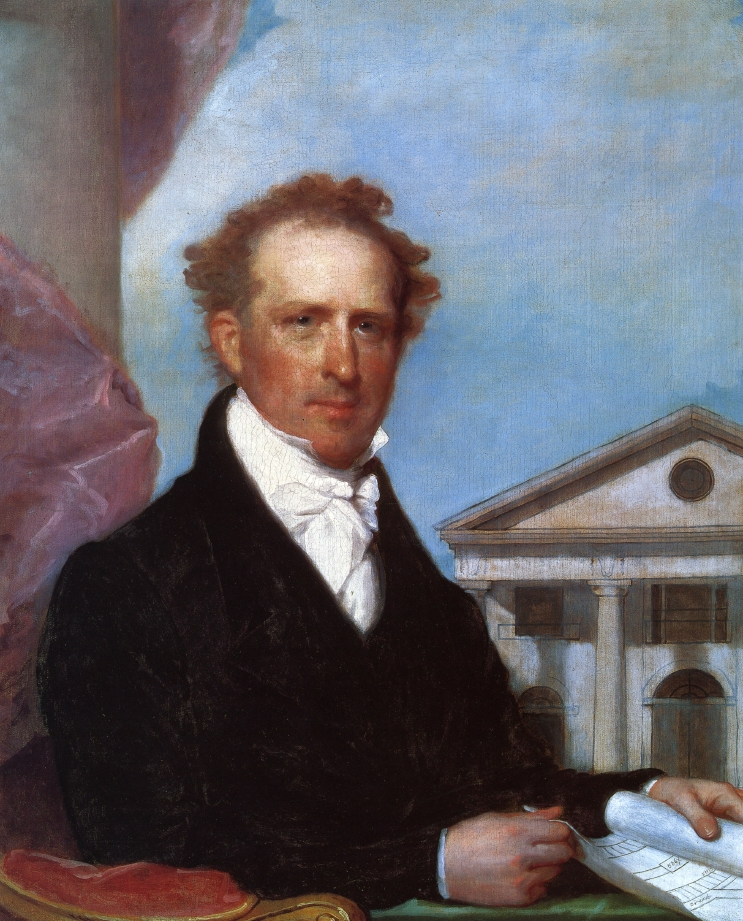
Candidate	Josiah Quincy III
Popular vote	1,202
Percentage	86.16%
Mayor before election
Josiah Quincy III
Federalist
Elected mayor
Josiah Quincy III
Federalist

The December 1825 Boston mayoral election saw the reelection of incumbent Josiah Quincy III to a fifth consecutive term. It was held on December 12, 1825. Quincy was unopposed.

The election saw Boston shift from holding mayoral elections in April to holding them in December.

== Results ==
December 1825 Boston mayoral election
Candidate	Votes	%
Josiah Quincy III (incumbent)	1,202	86.16
Scattering	193	13.84
Total votes	1,395	100

== See also ==
- List of mayors of Boston, Massachusetts
