= 1827 Maine gubernatorial election =

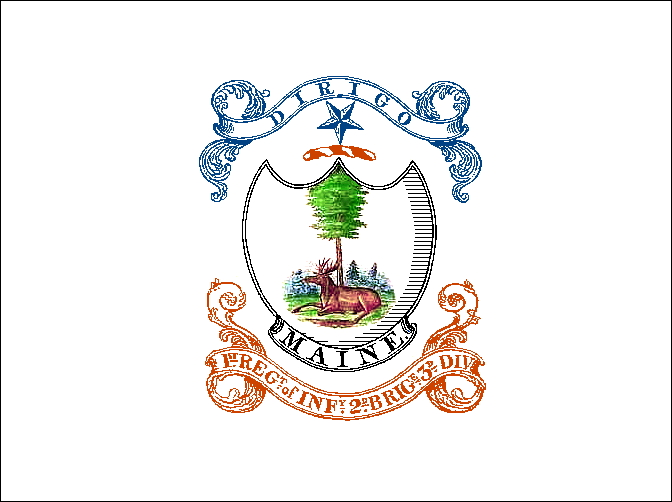
- September 10, 1827
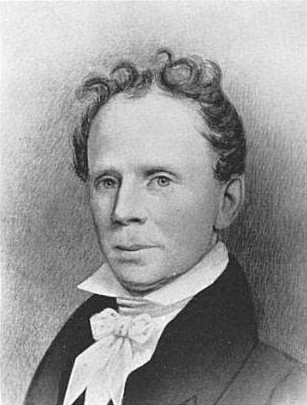
Nominee	Enoch Lincoln
Party	Democratic-Republican
Popular vote	19,969
Percentage	97.61%
- County results Lincoln: 90–100%
Governor before election
Enoch Lincoln
Democratic-Republican
Elected Governor
Enoch Lincoln
Democratic-Republican

The 1827 Maine gubernatorial election took place on September 10, 1827. Incumbent Democratic-Republican Governor Enoch Lincoln won re-election to a second term. He faced no opposition.

== Results ==
1827 Maine gubernatorial election
Party	Candidate	Votes	%
Democratic-Republican	Enoch Lincoln (incumbent)	19,969	97.61%
Write-in		489	2.39%
Majority		19,480	95.22%
Total votes		20,458	100.00%
Democratic-Republican hold			
