= 1824–25 United States Senate election in Pennsylvania =

The 1824–1825 United States Senate election in Pennsylvania was held between December 1824 and February 1825. William Marks was elected by the Pennsylvania General Assembly to the United States Senate.

== Results ==
Incumbent Democratic-Republican Walter Lowrie, who was elected in 1818, was not a candidate for re-election to another term. The Pennsylvania General Assembly, consisting of the House of Representatives and the Senate, convened on December 14, 1824, to elect a new senator to fill the term beginning on March 4, 1825. Thirty-two ballots were recorded between that date and February 14, 1825. The results of the thirty-second and final ballot of both houses combined are as follows:

State legislature results
Party	Candidate	Votes	%
National Republican	William Marks	73	54.89
Democratic-Republican	Thomas Burnside	27	20.30
Federalist	John Sergeant	19	14.29
Democratic-Republican	Samuel D. Ingham	2	1.50
N/A	Not voting	12	9.02
Totals		133	100.00%

Preceded by 1818	Pennsylvania U.S. Senate election (Class III); 1824–25	Succeeded by 1830
