= 1818 United States Senate election in Pennsylvania =

The 1818 United States Senate election in Pennsylvania was held on December 8, 1818. Walter Lowrie was elected by the Pennsylvania General Assembly to the United States Senate.

== Results ==
Incumbent Democratic-Republican Abner Lacock, who was elected in 1812, was not a candidate for re-election to another term. The Pennsylvania General Assembly, consisting of the House of Representatives and the Senate, convened on December 8, 1818, to elect a new senator to fill the term beginning on March 4, 1819. The results of the vote of both houses combined are as follows:

State legislature results
Party	Candidate	Votes	%
Democratic-Republican	Walter Lowrie	87	67.97
Democratic-Republican	Isaac Weaver	32	25.00
Democratic-Republican	John Tod	1	0.78
N/A	Not voting	8	6.25
Totals		128	100.00%

Preceded by 1812	Pennsylvania U.S. Senate election (Class III); 1818	Succeeded by 1824–25
