= 1825 Maine gubernatorial election =

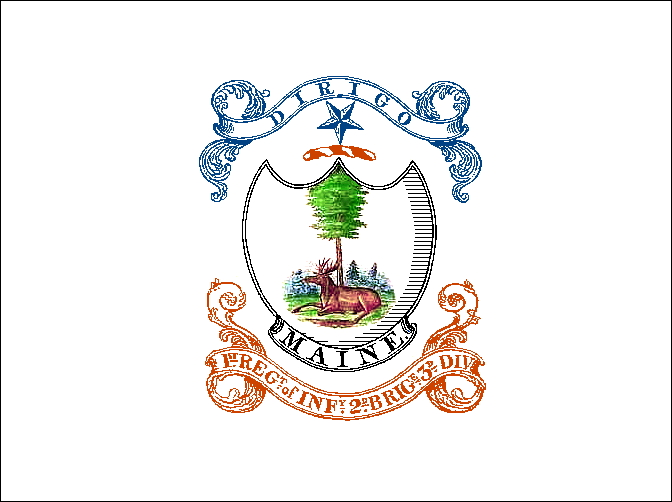
- September 12, 1825
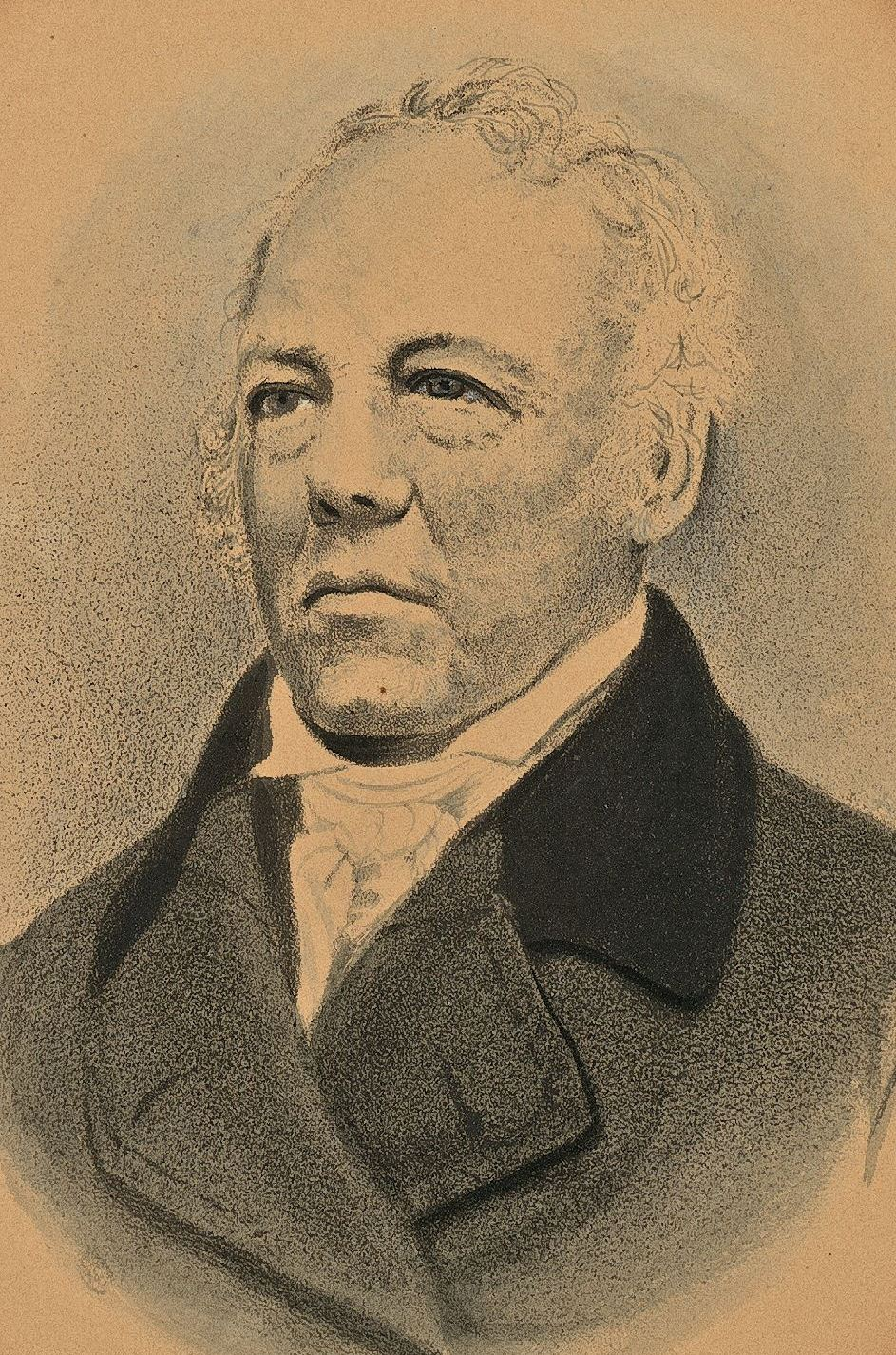
Nominee	Albion Parris
Party	Democratic-Republican
Popular vote	14,206
Percentage	93.14%
- County results Parris: 70–80% 80–90% 90–100%
Governor before election
Albion Parris
Democratic-Republican
Elected Governor
Albion Parris
Democratic-Republican

The 1825 Maine gubernatorial election took place on September 12, 1825. Incumbent Democratic-Republican Governor Albion Parris won re-election to a record fifth term. He faced no opposition.

== Results ==
1825 Maine gubernatorial election
Party	Candidate	Votes	%
Democratic-Republican	Albion Parris (incumbent)	14,206	93.14%
Write-in		1,046	6.86%
Majority		13,160	86.28%
Total votes		15,252	100.00%
Democratic-Republican hold			
