= 1825 Colombian general election =

- 1825
- Presidential election

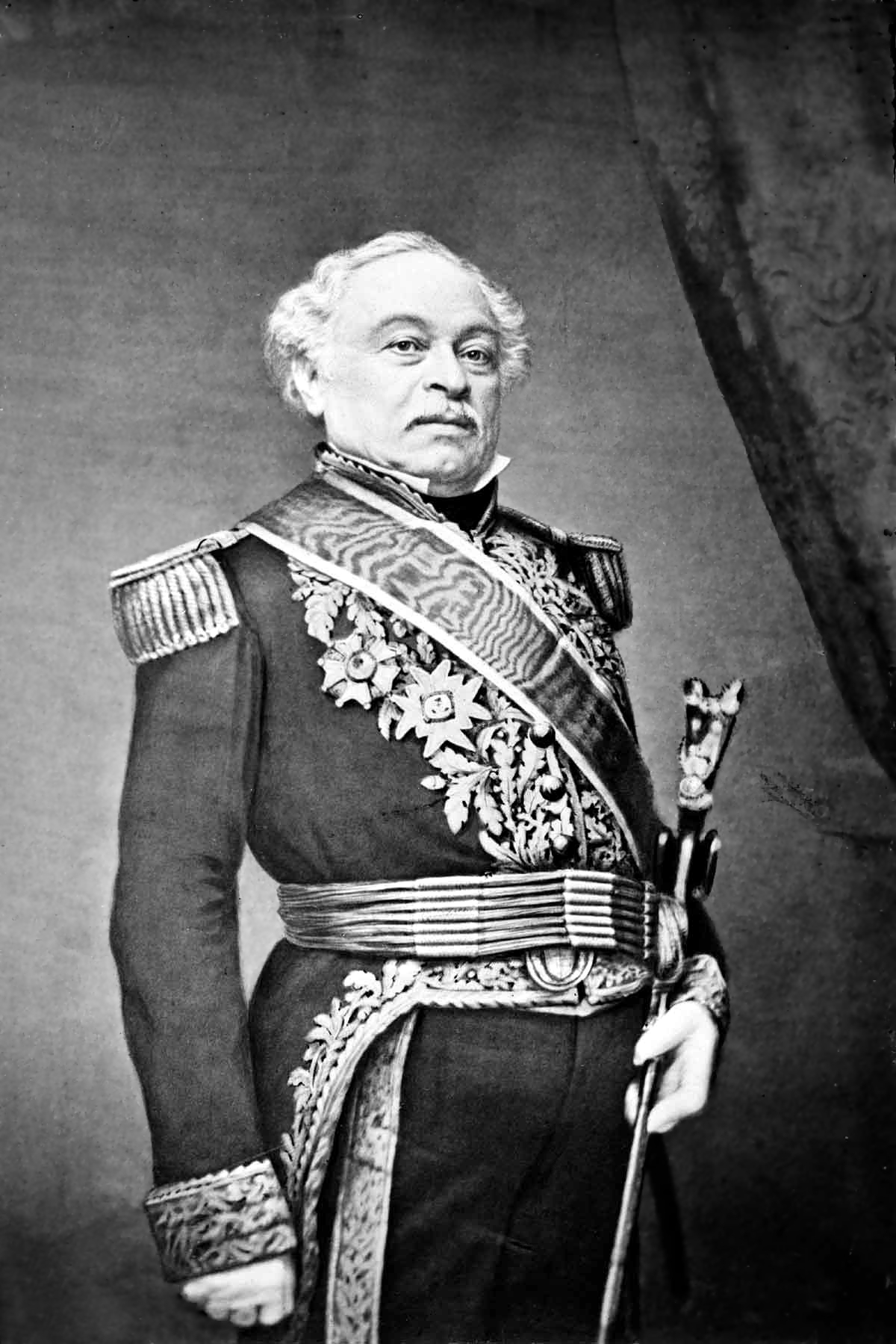
Candidate	Simón Bolívar	José Antonio Páez
Electoral vote	582	11
President before election
Simón Bolívar
Elected President
Simón Bolívar

General elections were held in Gran Colombia in 1825 to elect the presidency and Congress. The result was a victory for Simón Bolívar, who received 582 of the 608 votes. Francisco de Paula Santander was elected vice president.

== Electoral system ==
The 1821 constitution provided for a system where Provincial Assemblies elected the president and vice president. If no candidate received a majority of the vote, an election would be held in the Congress.

== Results ==
=== President ===
Candidate	Votes	%
Simón Bolívar	582	95.72
José Antonio Páez	11	1.81
Francisco de Paula Santander	10	1.64
Antonio José Sucre	4	0.66
Rafael Urdaneta	1	0.16
Total	608	100.00
Source: Historia electoral colombiana

=== Vice President ===
Candidate	Public vote		Congress vote	
Candidate	Votes	%	Votes	%
Francisco de Paula Santander	285	46.57	70	71.43
Pedro Briceño	79	12.91	6	6.12
José María Castillo	56	9.15	22	22.45
Luis A Baralt	50	8.17		
Antonio Jose Sucre	39	6.37		
Cristóbal Mendoza	26	4.25		
Domingo Caicedo	25	4.08		
Carlos Soublette	19	3.10		
Francisco Carabaño	7	1.14		
Joaquín Mosquera	6	0.98		
Pedro Gual Escandón	5	0.82		
Mariano Montilla	4	0.65		
José Antonio Páez	4	0.65		
Vicente Aguirre	2	0.33		
Rafael Urdaneta	2	0.33		
Pedro Fortoul	1	0.16		
Miguel Guerrero	1	0.16		
Santiago Mariño	1	0.16		
Total	612	100.00	98	100.00
Source: Historia electoral colombiana
