= 1827 Connecticut lieutenant gubernatorial election =

- April 12, 1827
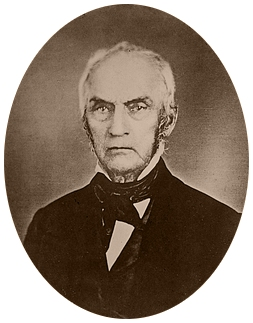
Nominee	John Samuel Peters
Party	National Republican
Popular vote	5,442
Percentage	82.10%
Lieutenant Governor before election
David Plant
National Republican
Elected Lieutenant Governor
John Samuel Peters
National Republican

The 1827 Connecticut lieutenant gubernatorial election was held on April 12, 1827, in order to elect the lieutenant governor of Connecticut. National Republican candidate and former member of the Connecticut Senate John Samuel Peters won the election as he ran with minimal opposition.

== General election ==
On election day, April 12, 1827, National Republican candidate John Samuel Peters won the election with 82.10% of the vote, thereby retaining National Republican control over the office of lieutenant governor. Peters was sworn in as the 31st lieutenant governor of Connecticut on May 2, 1827.

=== Results ===
Connecticut lieutenant gubernatorial election, 1827
Party	Candidate	Votes	%
National Republican	John Samuel Peters	5,442	82.10
	Scattering	1,188	17.90
Total votes		6,630	100.00
National Republican hold			
