= 1825 Rhode Island gubernatorial election =

State election in the United States

- April 20, 1825
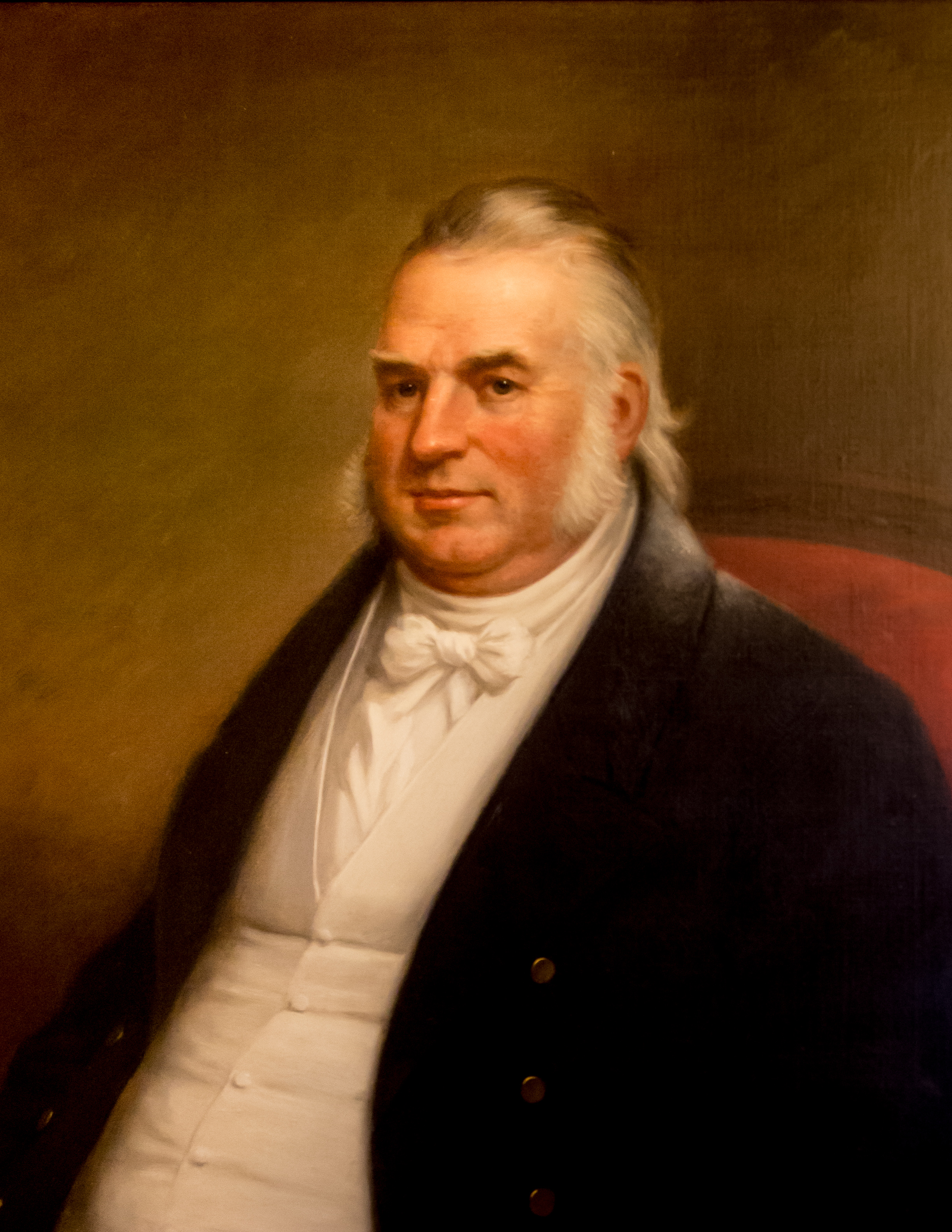
Nominee	James Fenner
Party	Democratic-Republican
Popular vote	1,731
Percentage	100.00%
- County results Fenner: 90–100%
Governor before election
James Fenner
Democratic-Republican
Elected Governor
James Fenner
Democratic-Republican

The 1825 Rhode Island gubernatorial election was an uncontested election held on April 20, 1825, to elect the governor of Rhode Island. James Fenner, the incumbent governor and Jackson Republican nominee, was the only candidate and so won with 100% of the vote. Jackson Republicans were a faction of the Democratic-Republican Party which favoured Andrew Jackson over John Quincy Adams for president.

== General election ==
=== Candidates ===
- James Fenner, Governor since 1824.

=== Results ===
1825 Rhode Island gubernatorial election
Party	Candidate	Votes	%	±%
Democratic-Republican	James Fenner (incumbent)	1,731	100.00%	
Majority		1,731	100.00%	
Democratic-Republican hold		Swing		
