= Andrew Gray (senator) =

American politician

Andrew Gray (died 1849) was a Democratic-Republican politician, a member of the Delaware Senate from 1817 to 1821. He was from Mill Creek Hundred, in New Castle County.

He was a trustee of the Academy of Newark, and in 1817 sponsored a bill to allow it to raise $50,000 by lottery in order to raise funds to establish a college. The lottery did not go ahead, and in January 1821 Gray sponsored a second bill to establish a college, as "Delaware College", to be funded by a tax on steamboats and stagecoaches. The prospect of these new taxes was exceptionally unpopular, and Gray was defeated by an anti-college "Independent Democratic" ticket in the 1821 elections by a 2-1 margin.

When Newark College was finally established in 1833, his three sons were sent there. He was appointed president of the trustees in 1839, succeeding Thomas Clayton, and was replaced by Eliphalet Wheeler Gilbert in April 1841. After being ousted as president, he sought an investigation of the fledgling college, accusing the trustees of financial mismanagement. On February 14, 1843, he presented a petition, stating that the college had been effectively taken over by the New School Presbyterians, and that it was heavily in debt. In order to allow it to survive into the future, he argued, it should be closed until the income from the endowment was sufficient to maintain it; otherwise, the endowment fund would quickly be spent on operating costs until there was nothing left. After some debate; his petition was rejected, and the college remained open.
