= April 1825 Boston mayoral election =

Election in Massachusetts, United States

1825 Boston mayoral election
- December 12, 1825
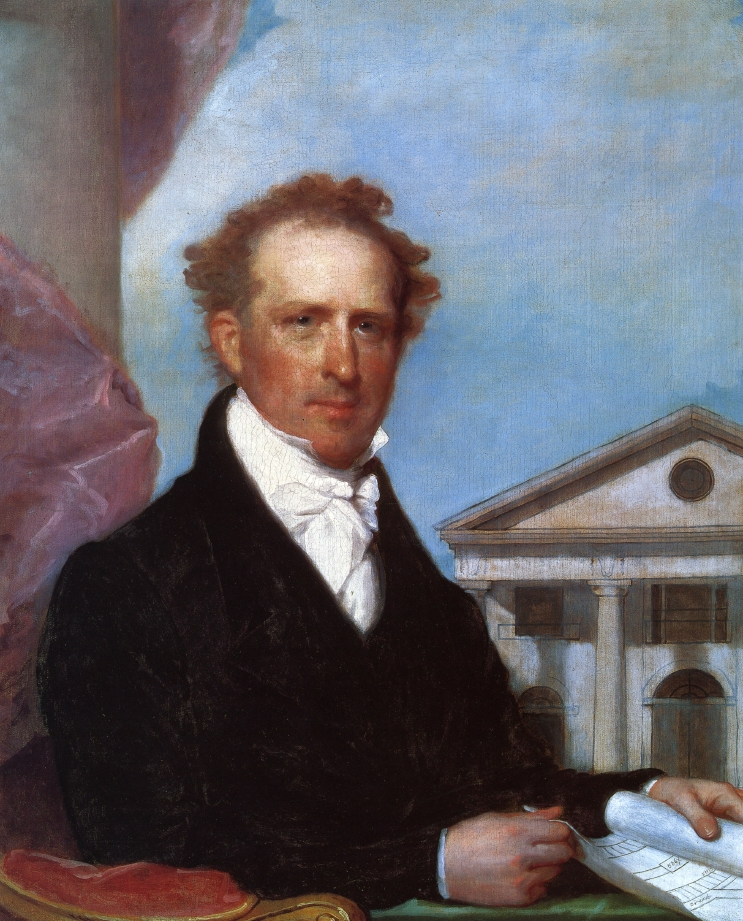
Candidate	Josiah Quincy III
Popular vote	1,836
Percentage	97.09%
Mayor before election
Josiah Quincy III
Federalist
Elected mayor
Josiah Quincy III
Federalist

The April 1825 Boston mayoral election saw the reelection of incumbent Josiah Quincy III to a third consecutive term. It was held on April 11, 1825. Quincy was unopposed.

== Results ==
April 1825 Boston mayoral election
Candidate	Votes	%
Josiah Quincy III (incumbent)	1,836	97.09
Scattering	55	2.91
Total votes	1,891	100

== See also ==
- List of mayors of Boston, Massachusetts
