= 1827 Virginia gubernatorial election =

- December 8, 1827
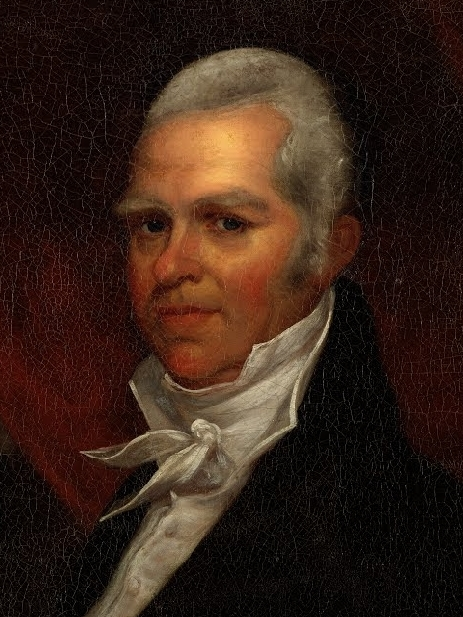
Nominee	William Branch Giles
1st ballot	143
Governor before election
William Branch Giles
Jacksonian
Elected Governor
William Branch Giles
Jacksonian (Note: The Journal of the House of Delegates does not list parties for this election. Giles's biographer says that in 1825, Giles "had joined the great party in Virginia bent on defeating Adams." Sobel and Raimo list Giles as a Democrat, while Kallenbach and Kallenbach list him as a Jeffersonian Republican.)

A gubernatorial election was held in Virginia on December 8, 1827. The incumbent governor of Virginia William Branch Giles was re-elected.

The election was conducted by the Virginia General Assembly in joint session. Giles had previously won the special election to succeed John Tyler, who had resigned his office effective March 4, 1827. The expiration of Giles's term, and the constitutionality of holding an election, was discussed prior to the balloting. Tyler's term had been due to expire in December 1827; however, Reuben B. Patteson claimed that the legislature had elected Giles for a new one-year term ending March 4, 1828, and moved that the election be postponed. After lengthy debate, most members concluded that Giles had been elected to complete Tyler's unexpired term. The motion to postpone the election was defeated, and the assembly proceeded to vote. Giles was elected with a majority on the first ballot.

== General election ==
1827 Virginia gubernatorial election
Candidate	First ballot	
Candidate	Count	Percent
William Branch Giles (incumbent)	143	71.50
Others	57	28.50
Total	200	100.00

== Bibliography ==
- Anderson, Dice Robbins (1914). William Branch Giles: A Study in the Politics of Virginia and the Nation from 1790 to 1830. Menasha, WI: George Banta Publishing Company.
- Kallenbach, Joseph E.; Kallenbach, Jessamine S. (1977). American State Governors, 1776–1976. Vol. 1. Dobbs Ferry, NY: Oceana Publications.
- Sobel, Robert; Raimo, John (1978). Biographical Directory of the Governors of the United States 1789–1978. Vol. 4. Westport, CT: Meckler Books.
- Virginia (1827). Journal of the House of Delegates [...]. Richmond.
