= 1827 Virginia gubernatorial special election =

- February 10, 1827
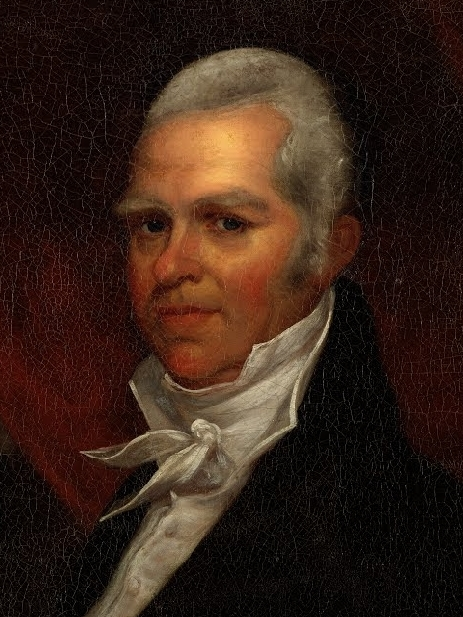

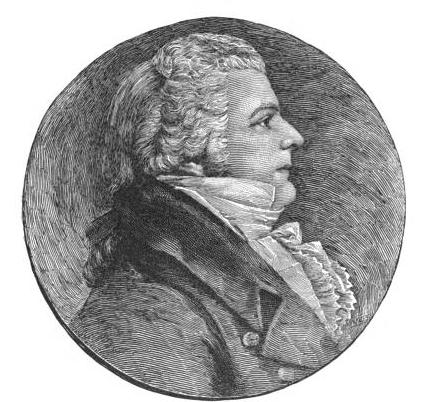

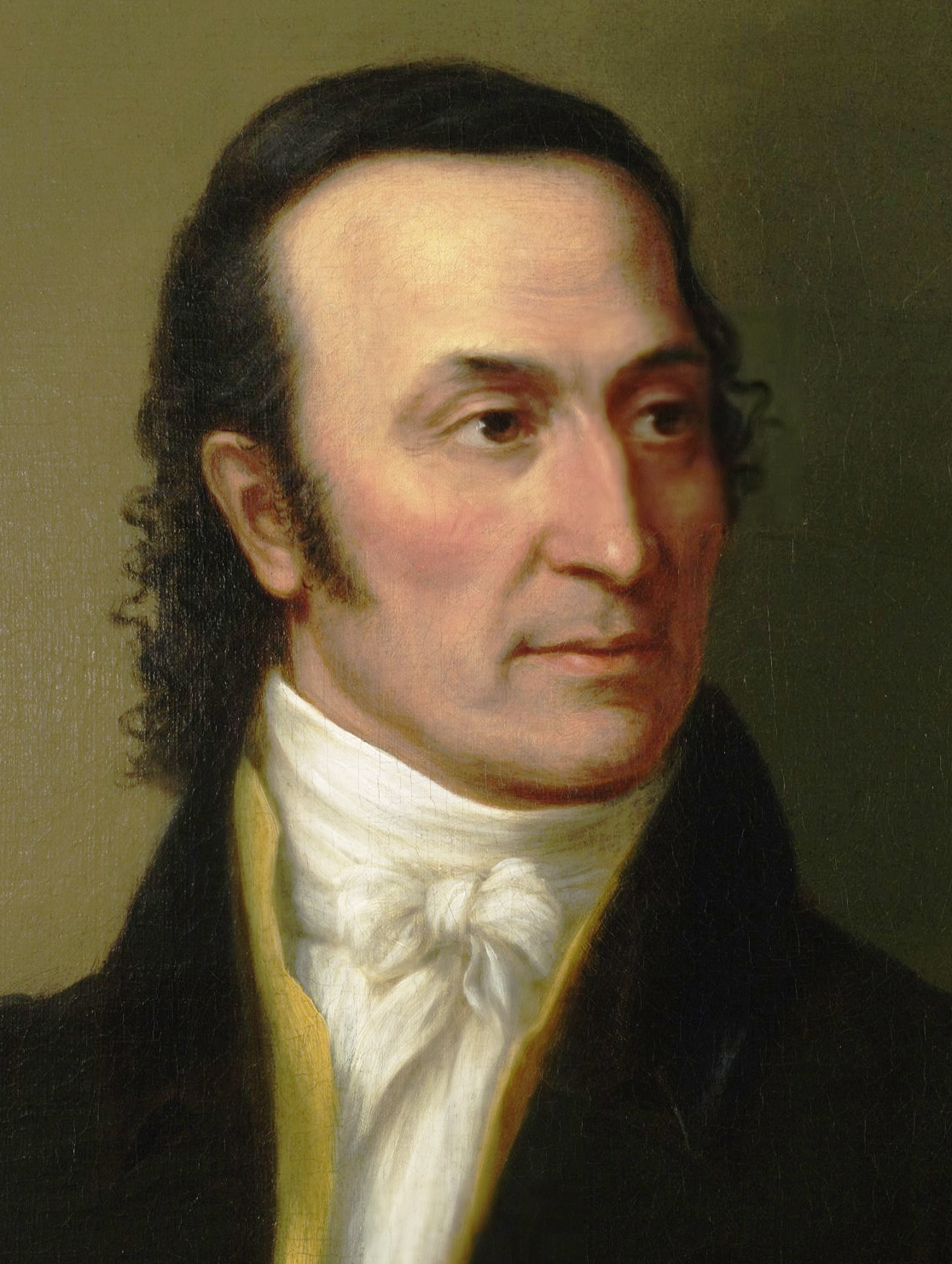
Nominee	William Branch Giles	Hugh Nelson	John Floyd (Note: Nominated despite his refusal to become a candidate.)
Party	Jacksonian	Jacksonian	Jacksonian
1st ballot	107	62	37
Governor before election
John Tyler
Democratic-Republican
Elected Governor
William Branch Giles
Jacksonian

A gubernatorial special election was held in Virginia on February 10, 1827. The member of the Virginia House of Delegates from Amelia County William Branch Giles defeated the member from Albemarle County Hugh Nelson and the U.S. representative from Virginia's 20th congressional district John Floyd.

The incumbent governor of Virginia John Tyler resigned effective March 4, 1827, following his election to the United States Senate. The election was conducted by the Virginia General Assembly in joint session. Floyd formally declined to run, after which the race narrowed to between Giles and Nelson. Giles's supporters praised his opposition to internal improvements and his hostility to the national Adams administration, while Nelson was celebrated as an Old Republican of the "School of '98." All three candidates were "opposition men" and Jacksonians. Giles was elected with a majority on the first ballot.

== General election ==
1827 Virginia gubernatorial special election
Party	Candidate	First ballot	
Party	Candidate	Count	Percent
Jacksonian	William Branch Giles	107	50.95
Jacksonian	Hugh Nelson	62	29.52
Jacksonian	John Floyd	37	17.62
Others		4	1.90
Total		210	100.00

== Bibliography ==
- Sobel, Robert; Raimo, John (1978). Biographical Directory of the Governors of the United States 1789–1978. Vol. 4. Westport, CT: Meckler Books.
- Virginia (1826). Journal of the House of Delegates [...]. Richmond.
