= List of governors of Virginia =

Governor of Virginia
- Commonwealth Seal

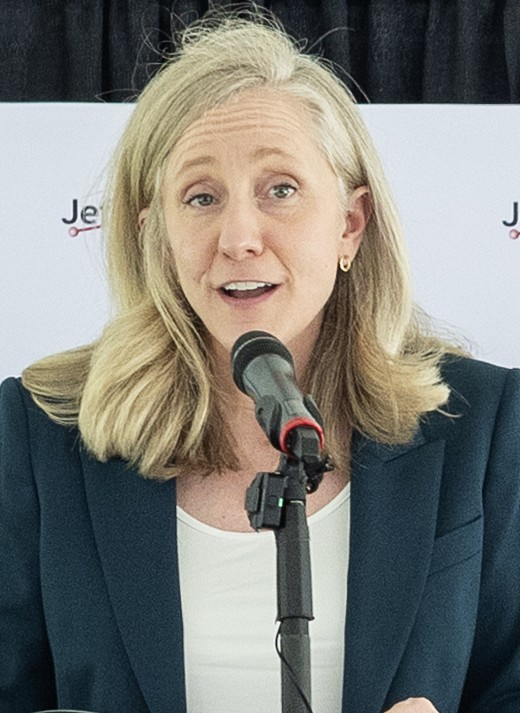
- Incumbent; Abigail Spanberger since January 17, 2026
- Style: The Honorable
- Residence: Virginia Executive Mansion
- Term length: Four years, renewable once nonconsecutively
- Inaugural holder: Patrick Henry
- Formation: Official Statehood of the Constitution of Virginia, June 25, 1788
- Succession: Line of succession
- Deputy: Lieutenant Governor of Virginia
- Salary: $174,000 (2026)
- Website: governor.virginia.gov

The governor of Virginia is the head of government of the Commonwealth of Virginia, as well as commander-in-chief of the state's national guard.

The first Constitution of 1776 created the office of governor, to be elected annually by the Virginia General Assembly. The governor could serve up to three years at a time, and once out of office, could not serve again for four years. The 1830 constitution changed the thrice-renewable one-year term length to a non-renewable three-year term, set the start date at the first day in January following an election, and prevented governors from succeeding themselves. The 1851 Constitution increased terms to four years and made the office elected by the people, rather than the legislature. The commencement of the Governor's term was moved to the first day in February by the 1902 Constitution, and then to the Saturday after the second Wednesday in January by the 1971 and current constitution.

If the governor dies, resigns or is removed from office (via impeachment conviction), the lieutenant governor of Virginia becomes governor. The office of lieutenant governor was created in 1851. Prior to that a Council of State existed; it chose from among its members a president who would be "lieutenant-governor" and would act as governor when there was a vacancy in that office. The governor and the lieutenant governor are elected at the same time but not on the same ticket. Officially, there have been 75 governors of Virginia; the acting governors are not counted.

The current governor is Democrat Abigail Spanberger, who took office on January 17, 2026.

== Governors ==
Virginia was one of the original Thirteen Colonies and was admitted as a state on June 25, 1788. Before it declared its independence, Virginia was a colony of the Kingdom of Great Britain. It seceded from the Union on April 17, 1861, and was admitted to the Confederate States of America on May 7, 1861. Following the end of the American Civil War, Virginia during Reconstruction constituted the First Military District, which exerted some control over governor appointments and elections. Virginia was readmitted to the Union on January 26, 1870.

The federal government recognized the Restored Government of Virginia, based in Wheeling, as the legitimate government in Virginia on June 25, 1861. It elected its own slate of governors, and after West Virginia was split from Virginia on June 20, 1863, the restored government relocated to Alexandria.

Governors of the Commonwealth of Virginia
No.	Governor		Term in office	Party	Election	Lt. Governor (Note: The office of lieutenant governor was created in 1851 and first filled in 1852.) (Note: Lieutenant governors represented the same party as their governor unless noted.)
1		Patrick Henry (1736–1799)	July 6, 1776 – June 1, 1779 (1061 days; term-limited) (Note: Under the 1776 constitution, governors were ineligible to serve longer than three years successively.)	No parties	1776	Office did not exist
1		Patrick Henry (1736–1799)	July 6, 1776 – June 1, 1779 (1061 days; term-limited)	No parties	1777	Office did not exist
1		Patrick Henry (1736–1799)	July 6, 1776 – June 1, 1779 (1061 days; term-limited)	No parties	1778	Office did not exist
2		Thomas Jefferson (1743–1826)	June 1, 1779 – June 4, 1781 (735 days; retired)	No parties	1779	Office did not exist
2		Thomas Jefferson (1743–1826)	June 1, 1779 – June 4, 1781 (735 days; retired)	No parties	1780	Office did not exist
3		William Fleming (1727–1795)	June 4, 1781 – June 12, 1781 (9 days; retired)	No parties	Senior member of Governor's Council acting (Note: Jefferson refused reelection and left office at the end of his term. As the legislature had not yet elected a successor, due in part to chaos stemming from the Raid on Richmond, Fleming acted as governor until the next election.)	Office did not exist
4		Thomas Nelson Jr. (1738–1789)	June 12, 1781 – November 22, 1781 (164 days; resigned) (Note: Nelson resigned due to ill health.)	No parties	^{Jun.}1781	Office did not exist
–		David Jameson (1723–1793)	November 22, 1781 – December 1, 1781 (10 days; retired)	No parties	Senior member of Governor's Council acting	Office did not exist
5		Benjamin Harrison V (1726–1791)	December 1, 1781 – November 30, 1784 (1096 days; term-limited)	No parties	^{Nov.}1781	Office did not exist
5		Benjamin Harrison V (1726–1791)	December 1, 1781 – November 30, 1784 (1096 days; term-limited)	No parties	1782	Office did not exist
5		Benjamin Harrison V (1726–1791)	December 1, 1781 – November 30, 1784 (1096 days; term-limited)	No parties	1783	Office did not exist
6		Patrick Henry (1736–1799)	November 30, 1784 – November 30, 1786 (731 days; retired)	No parties	1784	Office did not exist
6		Patrick Henry (1736–1799)	November 30, 1784 – November 30, 1786 (731 days; retired)	No parties	1785	Office did not exist
7		Edmund Randolph (1753–1813)	November 30, 1786 – November 12, 1788 (714 days; resigned) (Note: Randolph resigned to serve in the Virginia House of Delegates and promote the United States Constitution there.)	No parties	1786	Office did not exist
7		Edmund Randolph (1753–1813)	November 30, 1786 – November 12, 1788 (714 days; resigned)	No parties	1787	Office did not exist
8		Beverley Randolph (1754–1797)	November 12, 1788 – December 1, 1791 (1115 days; term-limited)	No parties	Senior member of Governor's Council acting	Office did not exist
8		Beverley Randolph (1754–1797)	November 12, 1788 – December 1, 1791 (1115 days; term-limited)	No parties	1788	Office did not exist
8		Beverley Randolph (1754–1797)	November 12, 1788 – December 1, 1791 (1115 days; term-limited)	No parties	1789	Office did not exist
8		Beverley Randolph (1754–1797)	November 12, 1788 – December 1, 1791 (1115 days; term-limited)	No parties	1790	Office did not exist
9		Henry Lee III (1756–1818)	December 1, 1791 – December 1, 1794 (1097 days; term-limited)	Federalist	1791	Office did not exist
9		Henry Lee III (1756–1818)	December 1, 1791 – December 1, 1794 (1097 days; term-limited)	Federalist	1792	Office did not exist
9		Henry Lee III (1756–1818)	December 1, 1791 – December 1, 1794 (1097 days; term-limited)	Federalist	1793	Office did not exist
10		Robert Brooke (d. 1800)	December 1, 1794 – November 30, 1796 (731 days; resigned) (Note: Brooke resigned, having been elected Virginia Attorney General.)	Democratic- Republican	1794	Office did not exist
10		Robert Brooke (d. 1800)	December 1, 1794 – November 30, 1796 (731 days; resigned)	Democratic- Republican	1795	Office did not exist
11		James Wood (1741–1813)	November 30, 1796 – December 19, 1799 (1115 days; term-limited) (Note: Many sources say that Hardin Burnley acted as governor, either from February 7, 1799, or December 7, serving until he resigned due to poor health on December 11, until Monroe became governor on December 19. However, details of their terms are sparse and it's unknown how official their capacity was, and Sobel & Raimo's entry on Wood mentions no acting governors and says that he left office on December 19.)	Democratic- Republican	Senior member of Governor's Council acting	Office did not exist
11		James Wood (1741–1813)	November 30, 1796 – December 19, 1799 (1115 days; term-limited)	Democratic- Republican	1796	Office did not exist
11		James Wood (1741–1813)	November 30, 1796 – December 19, 1799 (1115 days; term-limited)	Democratic- Republican	1797	Office did not exist
11		James Wood (1741–1813)	November 30, 1796 – December 19, 1799 (1115 days; term-limited)	Democratic- Republican	1798	Office did not exist
12		James Monroe (1758–1831)	December 19, 1799 – December 29, 1802 (1106 days; term-limited)	Democratic- Republican	1799	Office did not exist
12		James Monroe (1758–1831)	December 19, 1799 – December 29, 1802 (1106 days; term-limited)	Democratic- Republican	1800	Office did not exist
12		James Monroe (1758–1831)	December 19, 1799 – December 29, 1802 (1106 days; term-limited)	Democratic- Republican	1801	Office did not exist
13		John Page (1743–1808)	December 29, 1802 – December 11, 1805 (1079 days; term-limited)	Democratic- Republican	1802	Office did not exist
13		John Page (1743–1808)	December 29, 1802 – December 11, 1805 (1079 days; term-limited)	Democratic- Republican	1803	Office did not exist
13		John Page (1743–1808)	December 29, 1802 – December 11, 1805 (1079 days; term-limited)	Democratic- Republican	1804	Office did not exist
14		William H. Cabell (1772–1853)	December 11, 1805 – December 12, 1808 (1098 days; term-limited)	Democratic- Republican	1805	Office did not exist
14		William H. Cabell (1772–1853)	December 11, 1805 – December 12, 1808 (1098 days; term-limited)	Democratic- Republican	1806	Office did not exist
14		William H. Cabell (1772–1853)	December 11, 1805 – December 12, 1808 (1098 days; term-limited)	Democratic- Republican	1807	Office did not exist
15		John Tyler Sr. (1747–1813)	December 12, 1808 – January 15, 1811 (765 days; resigned) (Note: Tyler resigned, having been confirmed to the United States District Court for the District of Virginia.)	Democratic- Republican	1808	Office did not exist
15		John Tyler Sr. (1747–1813)	December 12, 1808 – January 15, 1811 (765 days; resigned)	Democratic- Republican	1809	Office did not exist
15		John Tyler Sr. (1747–1813)	December 12, 1808 – January 15, 1811 (765 days; resigned)	Democratic- Republican	1810	Office did not exist
—		George William Smith (1762–1811)	January 15, 1811 – January 19, 1811 (5 days; lost election)	Democratic- Republican	Senior member of Governor's Council acting	Office did not exist
16		James Monroe (1758–1831)	January 19, 1811 – April 3, 1811 (75 days; resigned) (Note: Monroe resigned, having been appointed United States Secretary of State.)	Democratic- Republican	^{Jan.}1811 (special)	Office did not exist
17		George William Smith (1762–1811)	April 3, 1811 – December 26, 1811 (268 days; died in office)	Democratic- Republican	Senior member of Governor's Council acting	Office did not exist
17		George William Smith (1762–1811)	April 3, 1811 – December 26, 1811 (268 days; died in office)	Democratic- Republican	^{Dec.}1811	Office did not exist
—		Peyton Randolph (1779–1828)	December 26, 1811 – January 4, 1812 (10 days; retired)	Democratic- Republican	Senior member of Governor's Council acting	Office did not exist
18		James Barbour (1775–1842)	January 4, 1812 – December 11, 1814 (1073 days; term-limited) (Note: Barbour, being term-limited, had already been elected to the United States Senate when his term ended.)	Democratic- Republican	^{Jan.}1812 (special)	Office did not exist
18		James Barbour (1775–1842)	January 4, 1812 – December 11, 1814 (1073 days; term-limited)	Democratic- Republican	^{Dec.}1812	Office did not exist
18		James Barbour (1775–1842)	January 4, 1812 – December 11, 1814 (1073 days; term-limited)	Democratic- Republican	1813	Office did not exist
19		Wilson Cary Nicholas (1761–1820)	December 11, 1814 – December 11, 1816 (732 days; retired)	Democratic- Republican	1814	Office did not exist
19		Wilson Cary Nicholas (1761–1820)	December 11, 1814 – December 11, 1816 (732 days; retired)	Democratic- Republican	1815	Office did not exist
20		James Patton Preston (1774–1843)	December 11, 1816 – December 11, 1819 (1096 days; term-limited)	Democratic- Republican	1816	Office did not exist
20		James Patton Preston (1774–1843)	December 11, 1816 – December 11, 1819 (1096 days; term-limited)	Democratic- Republican	1817	Office did not exist
20		James Patton Preston (1774–1843)	December 11, 1816 – December 11, 1819 (1096 days; term-limited)	Democratic- Republican	1818	Office did not exist
21		Thomas Mann Randolph Jr. (1768–1828)	December 11, 1819 – December 11, 1822 (1097 days; term-limited)	Democratic- Republican	1819	Office did not exist
21		Thomas Mann Randolph Jr. (1768–1828)	December 11, 1819 – December 11, 1822 (1097 days; term-limited)	Democratic- Republican	1820	Office did not exist
21		Thomas Mann Randolph Jr. (1768–1828)	December 11, 1819 – December 11, 1822 (1097 days; term-limited)	Democratic- Republican	1821	Office did not exist
22		James Pleasants (1769–1836)	December 11, 1822 – December 11, 1825 (1097 days; term-limited)	Democratic- Republican	1822	Office did not exist
22		James Pleasants (1769–1836)	December 11, 1822 – December 11, 1825 (1097 days; term-limited)	Democratic- Republican	1823	Office did not exist
22		James Pleasants (1769–1836)	December 11, 1822 – December 11, 1825 (1097 days; term-limited)	Democratic- Republican	1824	Office did not exist
23		John Tyler (1790–1862)	December 11, 1825 – March 4, 1827 (449 days; resigned) (Note: Tyler resigned, having been elected to the United States Senate.)	Democratic- Republican	1825	Office did not exist
23		John Tyler (1790–1862)	December 11, 1825 – March 4, 1827 (449 days; resigned)	Democratic- Republican	1826	Office did not exist
24		William Branch Giles (1762–1830)	March 4, 1827 – March 4, 1830 (1097 days; term-limited)	Democratic- Republican (Note: Giles is labeled a Democrat by Dubin and Sobel & Raimo, and a Democratic-Republican by Glashan and Kallenbach.)	^{Feb.}1827 (special)	Office did not exist
24		William Branch Giles (1762–1830)	March 4, 1827 – March 4, 1830 (1097 days; term-limited)	Democratic- Republican	^{Dec.}1827	Office did not exist
24		William Branch Giles (1762–1830)	March 4, 1827 – March 4, 1830 (1097 days; term-limited)	Democratic- Republican	1828	Office did not exist
25		John Floyd (1783–1837)	March 4, 1830 – March 31, 1834 (1489 days; term-limited) (Note: Under the 1830 constitution, governors were ineligible to serve again until three years after their term.)	Democratic	1830	Office did not exist
25		John Floyd (1783–1837)	March 4, 1830 – March 31, 1834 (1489 days; term-limited)	Democratic	1831	Office did not exist
26		Littleton Waller Tazewell (1774–1860)	March 31, 1834 – March 30, 1836 (731 days; resigned) (Note: Tazewell resigned over disagreements with the General Assembly.)	Democratic	1834	Office did not exist
—		Wyndham Robertson (1803–1888)	March 30, 1836 – March 31, 1837 (367 days; retired)	Whig (Note: Robertson is labeled a State's Rights Democrat by Kallenbach, a Democrat by Glashan, and a Whig by Sobel & Raimo.)	Senior member of Governor's Council acting	Office did not exist
27		David Campbell (1779–1859)	March 31, 1837 – March 31, 1840 (1097 days; term-limited)	Democratic (Note: Campbell is labeled a Whig by Glashan and Kallenbach, and a Democrat by Dubin and Sobel & Raimo.)	1837	Office did not exist
28		Thomas Walker Gilmer (1802–1844)	March 31, 1840 – March 20, 1841 (355 days; resigned) (Note: Gilmer resigned, having been elected to the United States House of Representatives for a term beginning March 4, 1841; he delayed his resignation two weeks, finally resigning due to a disagreement with the General Assembly on extradition.)	Whig	1840	Office did not exist
—		John M. Patton (1797–1858)	March 20, 1841 – March 31, 1841 (12 days; retired)	Whig	Senior member of Governor's Council acting (Note: After Gilmer's resignation, Patton acted as governor until the election, but the General Assembly failed to elect a successor, so the senior members of the Governor's Council each acted as governor for a year.)	Office did not exist
—		John Rutherfoord (1792–1866)	March 31, 1841 – March 31, 1842 (366 days; retired)	Democratic	Senior member of Governor's Council acting	Office did not exist
—		John Munford Gregory (1804–1884)	March 31, 1842 – January 5, 1843 (281 days; retired)	Whig	Senior member of Governor's Council acting	Office did not exist
29		James McDowell (1775–1851)	January 5, 1843 – January 1, 1846 (1093 days; term-limited)	Democratic (Note: McDowell is labeled a Whig by Sobel & Raimo and Dubin, and a Democrat by Kallenbach and Glashan.)	1842	Office did not exist
30		William Smith (1797–1887)	January 1, 1846 – January 1, 1849 (1097 days; term-limited)	Democratic	1845	Office did not exist
31		John B. Floyd (1806–1863)	January 1, 1849 – January 1, 1852 (1096 days; term-limited)	Democratic	1848	Office did not exist
32		Joseph Johnson (1785–1877)	January 1, 1852 – January 1, 1856 (1462 days; term-limited) (Note: Under the 1851 constitution, governors were ineligible to succeed themselves.)	Democratic	1851	Shelton Leake
33		Henry A. Wise (1806–1876)	January 1, 1856 – January 1, 1860 (1462 days; term-limited)	Democratic	1855	Elisha W. McComas (resigned December 7, 1857)
33		Henry A. Wise (1806–1876)	January 1, 1856 – January 1, 1860 (1462 days; term-limited)	Democratic	1855	William Lowther Jackson
34		John Letcher (1813–1884)	January 1, 1860 – January 1, 1864 (1462 days; term-limited)	Democratic	1859 (Note: Virginia proclaimed its secession from the Union on April 17, 1861. In response, delegates from the northwestern counties assembled at Wheeling and formed the Restored Government of Virginia, which the federal government recognized as the legitimate government of Virginia on June 25, 1861. It operated a government, including state and federal elections, over the northwestern part of the state, the counties immediately around Washington, D.C., and the eastern shore. On June 20, 1863, the northwestern counties were split into their own state, West Virginia, and the Restored Government relocated to Alexandria, and after the fall of Richmond, the government relocated to Richmond to be the sole state government.)	Robert Latane Montague
—		William Smith (1797–1887)	January 1, 1864 – May 9, 1865 (495 days; government disestablished) (Note: President Andrew Johnson issued an executive order on May 9, 1865, proclaiming that the state government run by Letcher and Smith had been illegitimate as of April 17, 1861, and that Pierpont was the legitimate governor. Smith continued to attempt to claim the office until May 20.)	Democratic	1863 (Confederate)	Samuel Price
35		Francis Harrison Pierpont (1814–1889)	June 20, 1861 – April 4, 1868 (2481 days; removed) (Note: The Reconstruction Acts placed Virginia under full military control, and General John Schofield appointed Wells provisional governor.)	Union	1861 (Union)	Daniel Polsley
35		Francis Harrison Pierpont (1814–1889)	June 20, 1861 – April 4, 1868 (2481 days; removed)	Union	1861 (Union)	Vacant
35		Francis Harrison Pierpont (1814–1889)	June 20, 1861 – April 4, 1868 (2481 days; removed)	Union	1863 (Union)	Leopold Copeland Parker Cowper
—		Henry H. Wells (1823–1900)	April 4, 1868 – September 21, 1869 (536 days; resigned) (Note: Wells was ordered to resign by General Edward Canby, who appointed Walker (who had already won election) in his place.)	Appointed by military occupation		Vacant
36		Gilbert C. Walker (1833–1885)	September 21, 1869 – January 1, 1874 (1564 days; term-limited) (Note: Under the 1864 constitution, governors were ineligible to succeed themselves.)	Appointed by military occupation		John F. Lewis
36		Gilbert C. Walker (1833–1885)	September 21, 1869 – January 1, 1874 (1564 days; term-limited)	Republican (Note: Walker ran in 1869 as a "Conservative Republican" to differentiate from his opponent who was running as a Radical Republican.)	1869	John Lawrence Marye Jr. (Note: Represented the Conservative Party)
37		James L. Kemper (1823–1895)	January 1, 1874 – January 1, 1878 (1462 days; term-limited) (Note: Under the 1870 constitution, governors were ineligible to succeed themselves.)	Democratic	1873	Robert E. Withers (resigned March 1, 1875)
37		James L. Kemper (1823–1895)	January 1, 1874 – January 1, 1878 (1462 days; term-limited)	Democratic	1873	Henry Wirtz Thomas (Note: Represented the Republican Party)
38		Frederick W. M. Holliday (1828–1899)	January 1, 1878 – January 1, 1882 (1462 days; term-limited)	Democratic	1877	James A. Walker
39		William E. Cameron (1842–1927)	January 1, 1882 (Note: The constitutional start date of the gubernatorial term was January 1, with no requirement for an oath; Cameron was not sworn in until January 2, presumably because January 1 was a Sunday.) – January 1, 1886 (1462 days; term-limited)	Readjuster	1881	John F. Lewis
40		Fitzhugh Lee (1835–1905)	January 1, 1886 – January 1, 1890 (1462 days; term-limited) (Note: Lee, being term-limited, had already lost the Democratic nomination for the United States Senate.)	Democratic	1885	John E. Massey
41		Philip W. McKinney (1832–1899)	January 1, 1890 – January 1, 1894 (1462 days; term-limited)	Democratic	1889	James Hoge Tyler
42		Charles T. O'Ferrall (1840–1905)	January 1, 1894 – January 1, 1898 (1462 days; term-limited)	Democratic	1893	Robert Craig Kent
43		James Hoge Tyler (1846–1925)	January 1, 1898 – January 1, 1902 (1461 days; term-limited)	Democratic	1897	Edward Echols
44		Andrew Jackson Montague (1862–1937)	January 1, 1902 – February 1, 1906 (1493 days; term-limited) (Note: Under the 1902 constitution, governors were ineligible to succeed themselves.)	Democratic	1901	Joseph Edward Willard
45		Claude A. Swanson (1862–1939)	February 1, 1906 – February 1, 1910 (1462 days; term-limited)	Democratic	1905	James Taylor Ellyson
46		William Hodges Mann (1843–1927)	February 1, 1910 – February 1, 1914 (1462 days; term-limited)	Democratic	1909	James Taylor Ellyson
47		Henry Carter Stuart (1855–1933)	February 1, 1914 (Note: The constitutional start date of the gubernatorial term was February 1, with no requirement for an oath; Stuart was not sworn in until February 2, presumably because February 1 was a Sunday.) – February 1, 1918 (1462 days; term-limited)	Democratic	1913	James Taylor Ellyson
48		Westmoreland Davis (1859–1942)	February 1, 1918 – February 1, 1922 (1462 days; term-limited)	Democratic	1917	Benjamin Franklin Buchanan
49		E. Lee Trinkle (1876–1939)	February 1, 1922 – February 1, 1926 (1462 days; term-limited)	Democratic	1921	Junius Edgar West
50		Harry F. Byrd (1887–1966)	February 1, 1926 – January 15, 1930 (1445 days; term-limited)	Democratic	1925	Junius Edgar West
51		John Garland Pollard (1871–1937)	January 15, 1930 – January 16, 1934 (1463 days; term-limited)	Democratic	1929	James Hubert Price
52		George C. Peery (1873–1952)	January 17, 1934 – January 18, 1938 (1463 days; term-limited)	Democratic	1933	James Hubert Price
53		James Hubert Price (1878–1943)	January 19, 1938 – January 20, 1942 (1463 days; term-limited)	Democratic	1937	Saxon W. Holt (died March 31, 1940)
53		James Hubert Price (1878–1943)	January 19, 1938 – January 20, 1942 (1463 days; term-limited)	Democratic	1937	Vacant
54		Colgate Darden (1897–1981)	January 21, 1942 – January 15, 1946 (1456 days; term-limited)	Democratic	1941	William M. Tuck
55		William M. Tuck (1896–1983)	January 16, 1946 – January 17, 1950 (1463 days; term-limited)	Democratic	1945	Lewis Preston Collins II (died September 20, 1952)
56		John S. Battle (1890–1972)	January 18, 1950 – January 19, 1954 (1463 days; term-limited)	Democratic	1949	Lewis Preston Collins II (died September 20, 1952)
56		John S. Battle (1890–1972)	January 18, 1950 – January 19, 1954 (1463 days; term-limited)	Democratic	1949	Vacant
56		John S. Battle (1890–1972)	January 18, 1950 – January 19, 1954 (1463 days; term-limited)	Democratic	1949	Allie Edward Stakes Stephens (elected December 2, 1952)
57		Thomas B. Stanley (1890–1970)	January 20, 1954 – January 11, 1958 (1453 days; term-limited)	Democratic	1953	Allie Edward Stakes Stephens (elected December 2, 1952)
58		J. Lindsay Almond (1898–1986)	January 11, 1958 – January 13, 1962 (1464 days; term-limited)	Democratic	1957	Allie Edward Stakes Stephens (elected December 2, 1952)
59		Albertis Harrison (1907–1995)	January 13, 1962 – January 15, 1966 (1464 days; term-limited)	Democratic	1961	Mills Godwin
60		Mills Godwin (1914–1999)	January 15, 1966 – January 17, 1970 (1464 days; term-limited)	Democratic	1965	Fred G. Pollard
61		Linwood Holton (1923–2021)	January 17, 1970 – January 12, 1974 (1457 days; term-limited) (Note: Under the 1971 constitution, governors are ineligible to succeed themselves.)	Republican	1969	J. Sargeant Reynolds (Note: Represented the Democratic Party) (died June 13, 1971)
61		Linwood Holton (1923–2021)	January 17, 1970 – January 12, 1974 (1457 days; term-limited)	Republican	1969	Vacant
61		Linwood Holton (1923–2021)	January 17, 1970 – January 12, 1974 (1457 days; term-limited)	Republican	1969	Henry Howell (elected December 4, 1971)
62		Mills Godwin (1914–1999)	January 12, 1974 – January 14, 1978 (1464 days; term-limited)	Republican	1973	John N. Dalton
63		John N. Dalton (1931–1986)	January 14, 1978 – January 16, 1982 (1464 days; term-limited)	Republican	1977	Chuck Robb
64		Chuck Robb (b. 1939)	January 16, 1982 – January 11, 1986 (1457 days; term-limited)	Democratic	1981	Dick Davis
65		Gerald Baliles (1940–2019)	January 11, 1986 – January 13, 1990 (1464 days; term-limited)	Democratic	1985	Douglas Wilder
66		Douglas Wilder (b. 1931)	January 13, 1990 – January 15, 1994 (1464 days; term-limited)	Democratic	1989	Don Beyer
67		George Allen (b. 1952)	January 15, 1994 – January 17, 1998 (1464 days; term-limited)	Republican	1993	Don Beyer
68		Jim Gilmore (b. 1949)	January 17, 1998 – January 12, 2002 (1457 days; term-limited)	Republican	1997	John H. Hager
69		Mark Warner (b. 1954)	January 12, 2002 – January 14, 2006 (1464 days; term-limited)	Democratic	2001	Tim Kaine
70		Tim Kaine (b. 1958)	January 14, 2006 – January 16, 2010 (1464 days; term-limited)	Democratic	2005	Bill Bolling
71		Bob McDonnell (b. 1954)	January 16, 2010 – January 11, 2014 (1457 days; term-limited)	Republican	2009	Bill Bolling
72		Terry McAuliffe (b. 1957)	January 11, 2014 – January 13, 2018 (1464 days; term-limited)	Democratic	2013	Ralph Northam
73		Ralph Northam (b. 1959)	January 13, 2018 – January 15, 2022 (1464 days; term-limited)	Democratic	2017	Justin Fairfax
74		Glenn Youngkin (b. 1966)	January 15, 2022 – January 17, 2026 (1464 days; term-limited)	Republican	2021	Winsome Earle-Sears
75	Rep. Abigail Spanberger - 118th Congress	Abigail Spanberger (b. 1979)	January 17, 2026 – Incumbent (Note: Spanbergers's term will expire on January 12, 2030; she will be term-limited.) (in office 310 days)	Democratic	2025	Ghazala Hashmi

== See also ==
- Gubernatorial lines of succession in the United States § Virginia
- First ladies and gentlemen of Virginia
- Lieutenant Governor of Virginia
- List of colonial governors of Virginia
- List of Virginia state legislatures

== Sources ==
- "Former Virginia Governors". National Governors Association.
- "Virginia Constitution". State Democracy Research Initiative. University of Wisconsin Law School.
- Dubin, Michael J. (2003). United States Gubernatorial Elections, 1776–1860: The Official Results by State and County. McFarland. ISBN 0-7864-1439-1 – via Internet Archive.
- Glashan, Roy R. (1979). American Governors and Gubernatorial Elections, 1775-1978. Meckler Books. ISBN 0-7201-1511-6 – via Internet Archive.
- Kallenbach, Joseph E.; Kallenbach, Jessamine S. (1977). American State Governors, 1776-1976. Oceana Publications. ISBN 978-0-379-00665-0 – via Internet Archive.
- Mullaney, Marie Marmo (1994). Biographical Directory of the Governors of the United States, 1988–1994. Greenwood Publishing Group. ISBN 0-313-28312-5 – via Internet Archive.
- Sobel, Robert; Raimo, John (1978). Biographical Directory of the Governors of the United States, 1789-1978. Vol. 4. Meckler Books. ISBN 0-930466-01-2 – via Internet Archive.
- Thorpe, Francis Newton, ed. (1909). The Federal and State Constitutions, Colonial Charters, and Other Organic Laws of the States, Territories, and Colonies Now or Heretofore Forming the United States of America. Vol. 7. United States Government Publishing Office – via Internet Archive.
