= Sarah McKelley King =

33rd president general of the Daughters of the American Revolution

33rd President General of the Daughters of the American Revolution
- In office 1983–1986
- Preceded by: Patricia Walton Shelby
- Succeeded by: Ann Davison Duffie Fleck

Personal details
- Born: Sarah Elizabeth McKelley; November 7, 1921 Murfreesboro, Tennessee, U.S.
- Died: February 20, 2013 (aged 91)
- Party: Democratic
- Spouse: Walter Hughey King
- Children: 4
- Education: Vanderbilt University

Sarah Elizabeth McKelley King (November 7, 1921 – February 20, 2013) was an American civic leader who served as the 33rd President General of the Daughters of the American Revolution from 1983 to 1986. King was also involved in politics, running to represent Tennessee's 4th District in the United States Congress in 1976 and later serving as an advisor to Congressman Al Gore.

== Early life and education ==
King was born Sarah Elizabeth McKelley on November 7, 1921, in Murfreesboro, Tennessee to James Dudley McKelley and Lutie Jameson Osborn. She was a seventh-generation resident of Rutherford County. King was a descendant of David Jameson, acting Governor of Virginia in 1781, and of Mary Jameson and Colonel John Jameson, who were all patriots of the American Revolution.

She graduated from East High School in Nashville and went on to attend Vanderbilt University.

== Career ==
=== Politics ===
In 1976, King ran in the Democratic primary for Tennessee's 4th congressional district in the United States Congress, receiving an endorsement from the The Daily News Journal. She was defeated by Al Gore. Congressman Gore then appointed her as his advisor.

She was appointed to the 50th American Presidential Inaugural Committee by President Ronald Reagan and regularly attended briefings at the White House.

=== Civic life ===
King was a member of numerous patriotic and cultural organizations including the Colonial Dames of America, the Daughters of the American Colonists, the Daughters of the American Revolution, the Daughters of the Cincinnati, The Huguenot Society of America, the United States Daughters of 1812, and the Ladies Hermitage Association. She served on the State Library Commission, was organizing regent of the Oaklands Association, was regional vice president of the Association for the Preservation of Tennessee Antiquities, and served as regent and board member of the Sam Davis Memorial Association. In 1978, she was named an Outstanding Citizen of Rutherford County. In 1985, Lincoln Memorial University awarded her an honorary Doctor of Public Service degree. In 1986, a plaque dedicated to her was placed at Vanderbilt University.

==== Daughters of the American Revolution ====
King joined the Colonel Hardy Murfree Chapter of the Daughters of the American Revolution (DAR) in April 1961. She served as the State Regent of Tennessee DAR and as the Curator General for the national society.

She toured France with several hundred members of the DAR, placing wreaths and dedicating commemorative markers and plaques. While in France, she visited Picpus Cemetery, the burial place of the Marquis de Lafayette, Yorktown Square, and statues of George Washington, the Comte de Rochambeau, and the Comte de Grasse. She also attended a ceremony at Notre-Dame de Paris, a reception at Hôtel de Ville, a supper at the Galerie des Batailles in the Palace of Versailles, a parade down the Champs-Élysées to the Arc de Triomphe, a reception at the American Embassy in Paris, an address to the American Church in Paris, and a pilgrimage to Normandy. The French daily newspaper Le Figaro reported that "The President General made a striking appearance at each affair and her voice ran out clearly and with conviction. She wore a beautiful black chapeau with cascading ostrich feathers, a chic red ensemble, and the insignia of her office. She spoke with an aristocratic British accent." At Yorktown Square in Paris, King dedicated a historic plaque honoring Benjamin Franklin, John Jay, and John Adams. At the Palace of Versailles, she presented Jean MacArthur, widow of General Douglas MacArthur and Thérèse de Gargan Leclerc de Hauteclocque, widow of General Philippe Leclerc de Hauteclocque, with NSDAR Peacemaker Awards.

In 1984, during King's administration, The Washington Post reported that Lena Santos Ferguson was denied membership in a Washington, D.C. chapter of the DAR because she was Black. King responded to an inquiry from The Washington Post stating that DAR's chapters have autonomy in determining members, saying "Being black is not the only reason why some people have not been accepted into chapters. There are other reasons: divorce, spite, neighbors' dislike. I would say being black is very far down the line....There are a lot of people who are troublemakers. You wouldn't want them in there because they could cause some problems." King's comments were reported in a page one story, ensuing public outrage and leading to the Council of the District of Columbia threatening to revoke the DAR's real estate tax exemption. She clarified further, saying that Ferguson should have been admitted as a member and that her application had been handled "inappropriately" by the local chapter. The DAR changed its bylaws to bar discrimination "on the basis of race or creed" following the incident. In addition, King announced a resolution to recognize "the heroic contributions of black patriots in the American Revolution".

In May 1985, King was the guest of a chapter of the DAR in Culpeper, Virginia for a Jameson Day celebration, where a historic marker was placed honoring Lieutenant David Jameson, Mary Jameson, and Lieutenant Colonel John Jameson.

From 1994 to 1996, she served as president of the DAR's National Officers Club.

== Personal life and death ==
On May 10, 1941, she married Walter Hughey King. Her husband served in the United States Marine Corps with the 3rd Marine Division during World War II and participated in the Battle of Iwo Jima and the Battle of Guam. She and her husband had four children.

She was a Methodist and attended First Methodist Church.

King died on February 20, 2013.
