= 1776 Virginia gubernatorial election =

- June 29, 1776

106 members of the Virginia Convention 54 votes needed to win
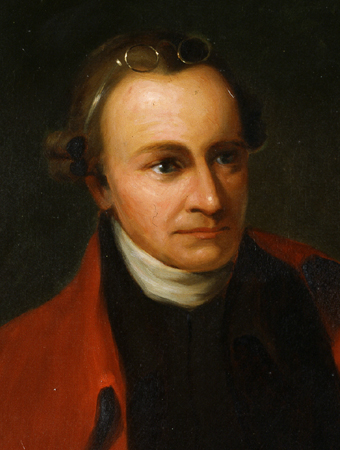

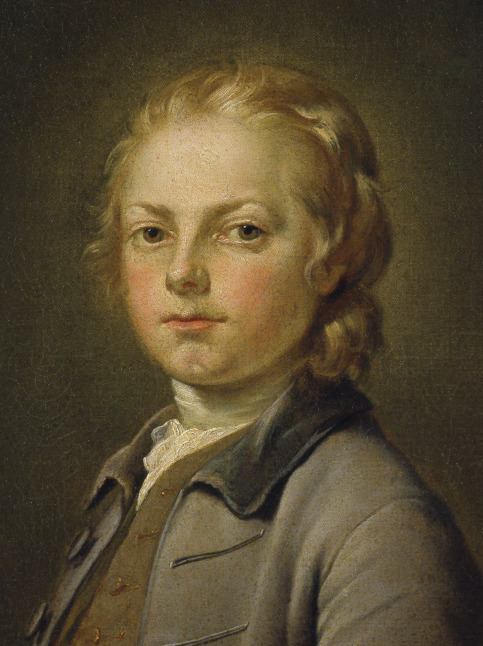
Nominee	Patrick Henry	Thomas Nelson Jr.
1st ballot	60	45
Elected Governor
Patrick Henry

A gubernatorial election was held in Virginia on June 29, 1776. The delegate from Hanover County Patrick Henry defeated Thomas Nelson Jr. and John Page.

The election took place forty-five days after the adoption of the Lee Resolution by the Fifth Virginia Convention declaring the independence of the United Colonies from Great Britain. The Constitution of Virginia had been adopted by the convention the same day and went into effect immediately. The new constitution called for the governor of Virginia to be elected by the votes of the Virginia General Assembly meeting in joint session. The Virginia Convention, as the provisional legislature of the commonwealth, performed this function in the election of 1776. Prior to 1830, the governor served a term of one year, renewable no more than three times in a seven-year period. Henry was reelected four times: twice consecutively in 1777 and 1778, and again in 1784 and 1785, to serve a total of five consecutive terms in office.

== Background ==
The Fifth Virginia Convention convened in Williamsburg on May 6, 1776, amidst increasingly widespread support for independence among the Patriots who supported the American Revolution. On May 15, 1776, the convention approved a resolution instructing Virginia's delegates in the Second Continental Congress to support a formal declaration of independence absolving the Thirteen Colonies from their allegiance to the British Empire. Congress voted to adopt the Lee Resolution on July 2, precipitating passage of the United States Declaration of Independence.

While Congress debated independence, the Virginia Convention took action to establish the foundations for an independent commonwealth. A Declaration of Rights was introduced in the convention on May 27 and adopted on June 12; on June 29, the delegates voted unanimously to adopt the proposed Constitution of Virginia. With the Constitution now in place, elections for governor and Attorney General proceeded immediately.

== Electoral system ==
The Constitution of 1776 called for the governor and other executive officers to be elected by a joint session of the General Assembly, with a majority of votes cast necessary to elect the governor. The governor was elected for a term of one year and limited to three terms in a seven-year period. With the first General Assembly yet unelected, the Virginia Convention carried out the election of the first governor and Attorney General. The election was conducted by secret ballot; in all, 106 delegates to the Virginia Convention cast votes for governor.

== Results ==
The Virginia Convention elected Henry by a majority of 60 electoral votes to 45 for his nearest competitor, Thomas Nelson. George Wythe, James Madison, Bartholomew Dandridge, and William Roscoe Wilson Curl were appointed to inspect the ballots and inform Henry of his election.

1776 Virginia gubernatorial election
Candidate	First ballot	
Candidate	Count	Percent
Patrick Henry	60	56.60
Thomas Nelson Jr.	45	42.45
John Page	1	0.94
Total	106	100.00
