= November 1781 Virginia gubernatorial election =

- November 30, 1781
Nominee
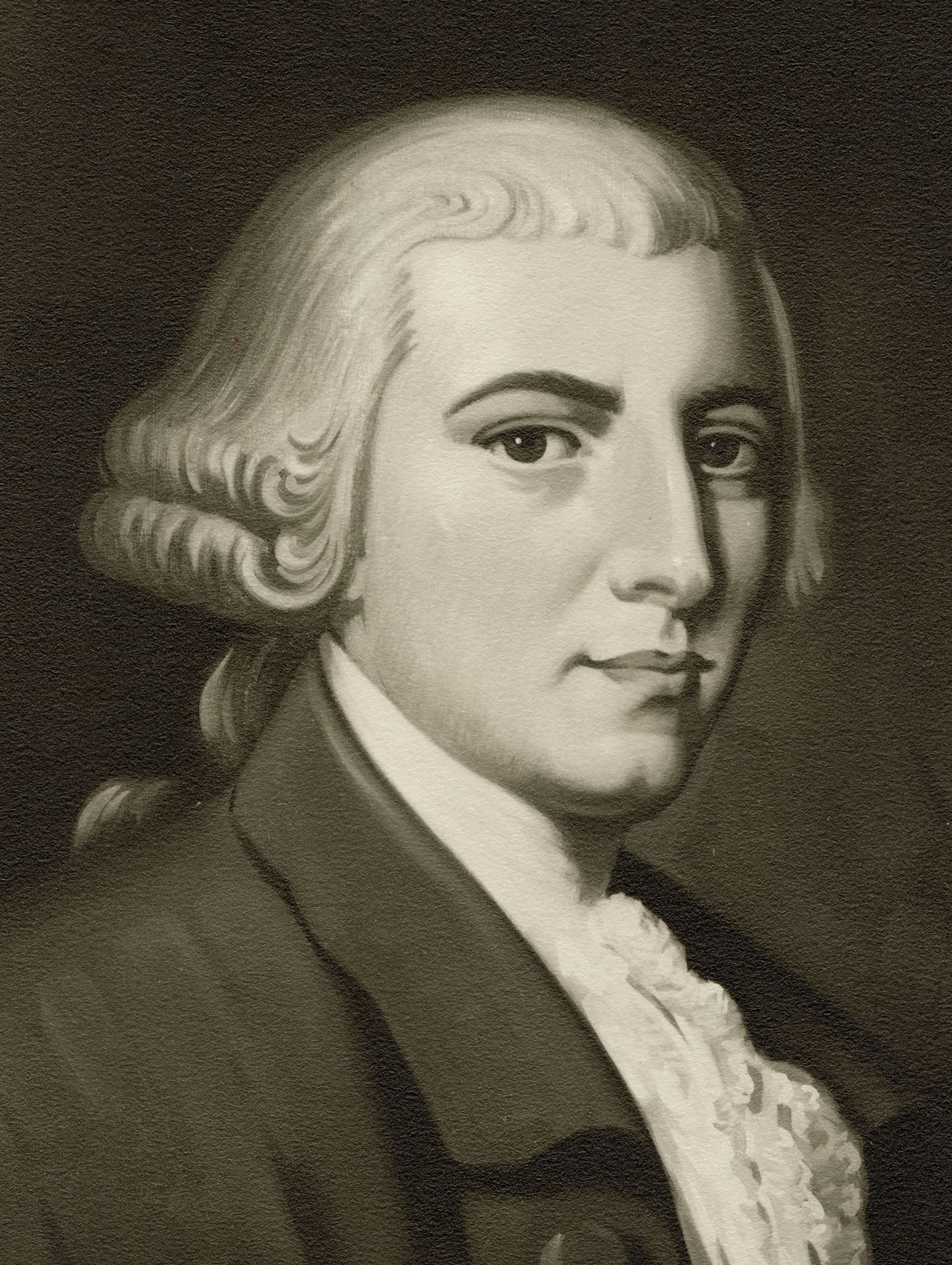
Benjamin Harrison V
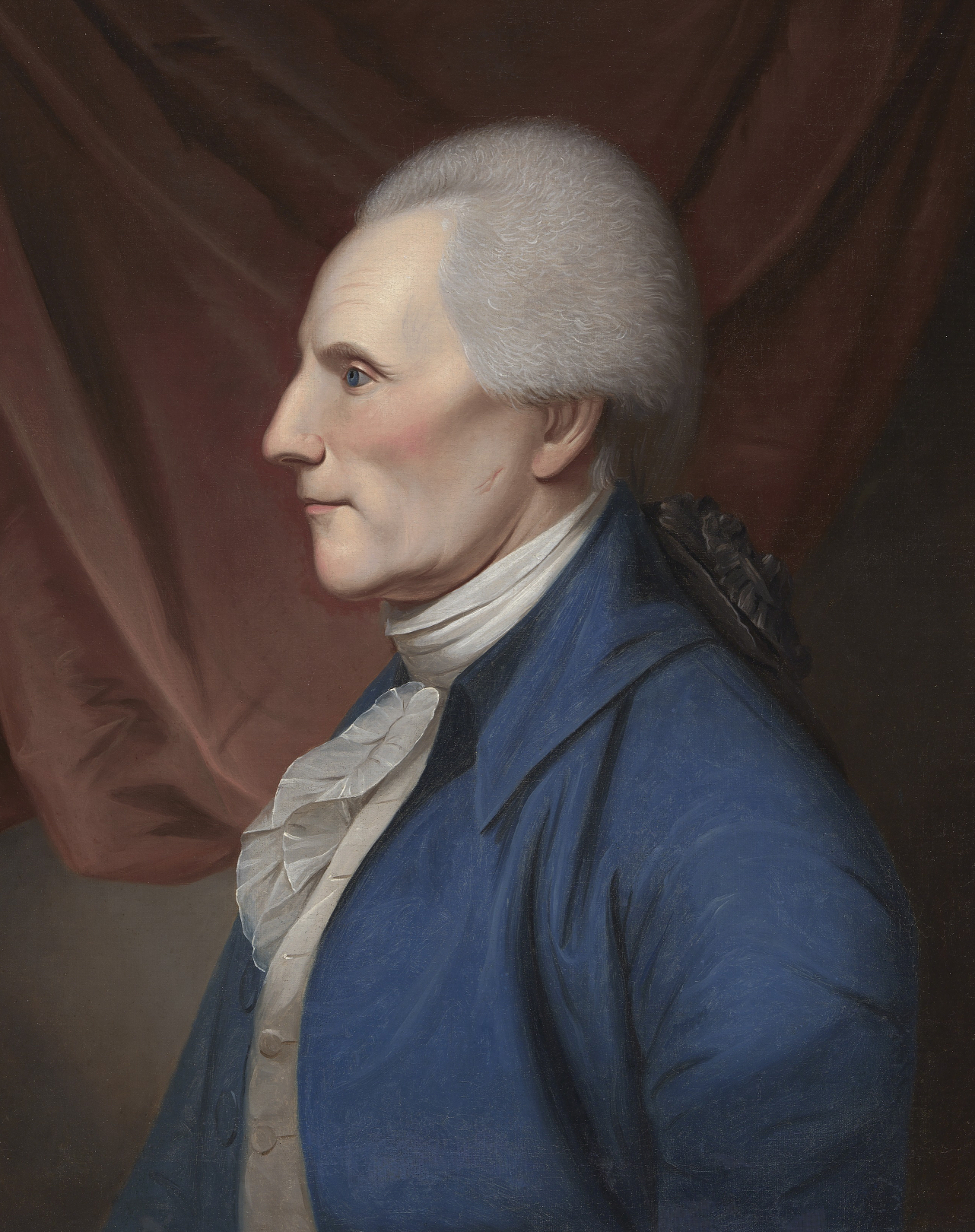
Richard Henry Lee
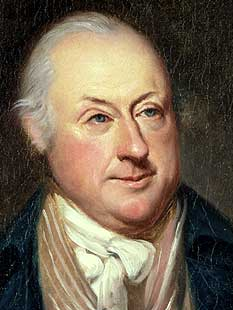
John Page
Governor before election
David Jameson (acting)
Elected Governor
Benjamin Harrison V

A gubernatorial election was held in Virginia on November 30, 1781. The delegate from Charles City County Benjamin Harrison V defeated the former delegate to the Second Continental Congress Richard Henry Lee and the delegate from Gloucester County John Page.

Thomas Nelson Jr. was elected by the Virginia General Assembly to succeed the retiring governor of Virginia Thomas Jefferson on June 12, 1781. Poor health led Nelson to resign the governorship on November 22. The Assembly met on November 30 and elected Harrison to a new term ending in November 1782; the number of votes cast for other candidates was not recorded.

== General election ==
November 1781 Virginia gubernatorial election
Candidate	First ballot	
Candidate	Count	Percent
Benjamin Harrison V	**	
Richard Henry Lee	**	
John Page	**	
Total	**	100.00

== Bibliography ==
- Evans, Emory G. (1975). Thomas Nelson of Yorktown: Revolutionary Virginian. Williamsburg, VA: Colonial Williamsburg Foundation.
- State of Virginia (1828). Journal of the House of Delegates [...]. Richmond.
