= 1863 Virginia gubernatorial elections =

Governor before election
disputed
Elected Governor
disputed

In 1863, amid the American Civil War (in which the state of Virginia was disputed between the United States and the breakaway Confederate States), two gubernatorial elections were held as a result of this dispute, a Confederate election and a U.S. election.

== Confederate election ==
1863 Virginia gubernatorial election (Confederate)
- May 28, 1863
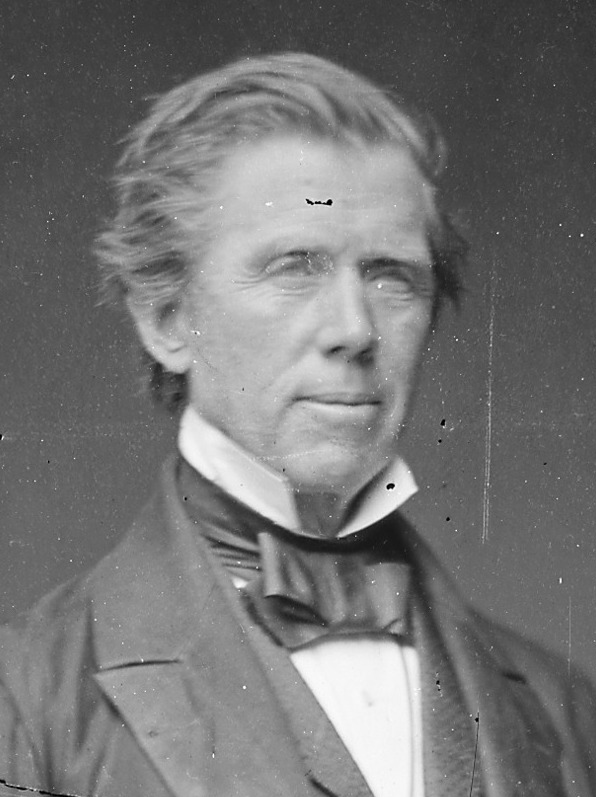

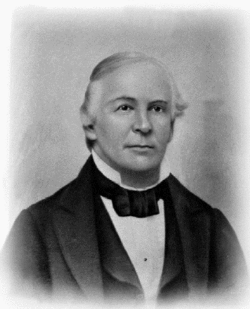
Nominee	William Smith	Thomas Flournoy	George Wythe Munford
Party	Democratic	Democratic	Democratic
Popular vote	28,613	23,543	7,478
Percentage	47.77%	39.16%	12.49%
- County results (Note: The returns of Pittsylvania and Prince George were rejected. The Counties of Culpeper, Page, Pendleton, and Shenandoah reportedly made no returns. The above county returns represent approximately half of all possible returns.); Smith: 30–40% 40–50% 50–60% 60–70% 70–80% 80–90% >90% Flournoy: 40–50% 50–60% 60–70% 70–80% Munford: 30–40% 40–50% 50–60% 60–70% 70–80% Unknown/No Votes
Governor before election
John Letcher (disputed)
Democratic
Elected Governor
William Smith (disputed)
Democratic

The 1863 Virginia Confederate gubernatorial election was held on May 28, 1863, to elect the Confederate governor of Virginia. At the time, the governorship of the state was disputed as a result of the American Civil War.

Virginia gubernatorial election, 1863 (Confederate)
Party	Candidate	Votes	%
Democratic	William Smith	28,613	47.77%
Democratic	Thomas Flournoy	23,453	39.16%
Democratic	George Wythe Munford	7,478	12.49%
Write-ins		353	0.59%
Total votes		59,987	100.00%
Democratic hold			

== Union election ==
1863 Virginia gubernatorial election (Union)
- May 28, 1863
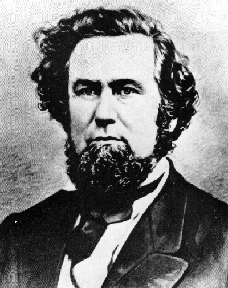
Nominee	Francis Harrison Pierpont
Party	Union
Popular vote	3,755
Percentage	100.00%
Governor before election
Francis Harrison Pierpont (disputed)
Union
Elected Governor
Francis Harrison Pierpont (disputed)
Union

The 1863 Virginia Union gubernatorial election was held on May 28, 1863, to elect the Unionist governor of Virginia. At the time, the governorship of the state was disputed as a result of the American Civil War, and disputed incumbent Unionist Francis Harrison Pierpont ran unopposed.

Virginia gubernatorial election, 1863 (Union)
Party	Candidate	Votes	%
Union	Francis Harrison Pierpont (incumbent)	3,755	100.00%
Total votes		3,755	100.00%
Union hold			
