= John Jameson (colonel) =

American Revolutionary War soldier (1751–1810)

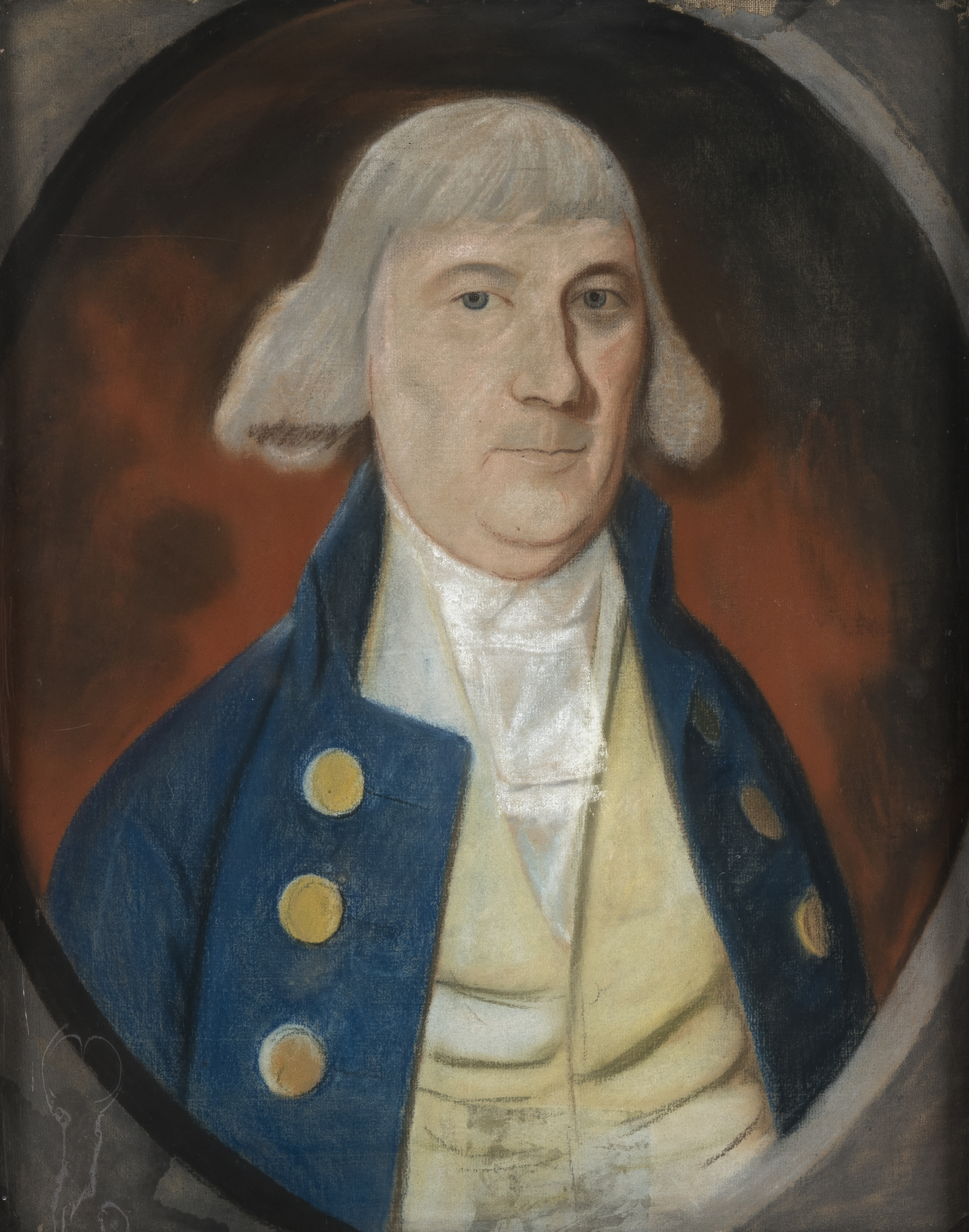
- Born: 1751
- Died: November 20, 1810 (aged 58–59)
- Education: The College of William and Mary
- Relatives: David Jameson (uncle)

John Jameson (1751 – November 20, 1810) was an American soldier, most notable for his service during the American Revolutionary War. He is equally notable for his missteps in matters concerning the apprehension of the British spy, John André, that allowed the escape of Andre's partner in the conspiracy, General Benedict Arnold, to surrender and turn-over the fort at West Point to the British. He was a resident of Culpeper, Virginia.

== Early life and family ==
Born in 1751, in Fairfax, Virginia Colony, John Jameson was of Scottish descent and belonged to the distinguished Jameson family of Virginia. He was a graduate of The College of William and Mary in Williamsburg, Virginia. (Note: the second-oldest college in the country.) He was described as being six feet tall, blue-eyed, of a fair-complexion, with black hair. Colonel John Jameson’s uncle was Lieutenant Governor David Jameson of Yorktown, Virginia, who served from 1780-81 under the governorship of Thomas Nelson Jr. (Note: David Jameson was also a signor of the United States Declaration of Independence, and briefly served as governor of Virginia in August 1781 when Governor Nelson took ill. He was elected as a state senator in 1783. He served in the Senate during the War (1776-1777), serving on Patrick Henry's privy council. His great nephew, John Jameson, served as a congressman for Missouri (1839-1849).)

== Military career ==
In the spring of 1775, under an old oak tree in Fairfax, Virginia (now Culpeper), Jameson voluntarily enlisted with other men—from Culpeper, Orange, and Fauquier counties—to form the Culpeper Minutemen to fight the British in the War for Independence. (Note: Making use of popular symbols and phrases of the period, the Culpeper Minutemen's battalion flag featured an obverse field containing an emblem of a snake (a symbol of the colonies) and the American Revolutionary mottoes "Liberty or Death" and "Don't Tread on Me.") These were the first soldiers raised for the war in Virginia. Jameson was made a captain and company commander in the Culpeper minutemen battalion. He and John Marshall were a "…leading spirit among the minute-men." This group of minutemen fought in the Battle of Great Bridge, the first Revolutionary War battle on Virginia soil, where the Americans defeated British troops under John Murray, 4th Earl of Dunmore—which temporarily ended British control of Virginia.

Jameson was elected by the Virginia Convention on June 13, 1776, to be captain of the 3rd Troop of Horse. (Note: Jameson had six competitors for the position, and received forty-eight votes, while his competitors received respectively 17, 15, 9, 4, 3, 2 votes.) One of his competitors was Henry "Light Horse Harry" Lee. Jameson took command June 16 as captain in a Virginia regiment of dragoons. He was promoted to major on March 31, 1777, in the 1st Continental Light Dragoons. Jameson was transferred April 7, 1777, to the 3rd Continental Light Dragoons, where he fought at the Battle of Brandywine Creek later that year. While encamped with George Washington at Valley Forge, Major Jameson was wounded in a skirmish on January 21, 1778. Throughout that year and the next he remained at Washington's side. He engaged the British at the New Jersey Battle of Monmouth Court House, in June 1778, and was promoted to the rank of colonel in August 1779.

=== West Point affair ===
In 1780, General George Washington placed key commanders in strategic areas around West Point, New York. As a colonel in the Continental Army, Colonel Jameson was placed in Tarrytown, New York under the command of General Benedict Arnold. Soon afterward, a man calling himself "John Anderson" was intercepted along a Hudson River valley footpath by militiamen and found to be in possession of documents that included information regarding the defenses of West Point, as well as movements of the American army. Since the papers were found in an odd place, "under the feet of his stockings", Colonel Jameson became alarmed and had Anderson detained. Jameson sent word to—and alerted—General Arnold, even though he had been dissuaded to do so by Major Benjamin Tallmadge, head of Continental Army Intelligence. Jameson could not believe that Arnold was capable of treason, even though Anderson was carrying a pass signed by him. Through continuing hand-delivered communications, it was noted Arnold was "…very desirous of the Papers and everything [else] being sent with him." Jameson followed his orders and sent 'Anderson' along with the papers. Because of the serious nature of the papers, Jameson also wrote to General Washington, enclosing copies of the papers taken from 'Anderson'. He still insisted, however, on notifying Arnold—who promptly left the fort and fled to the British lines.

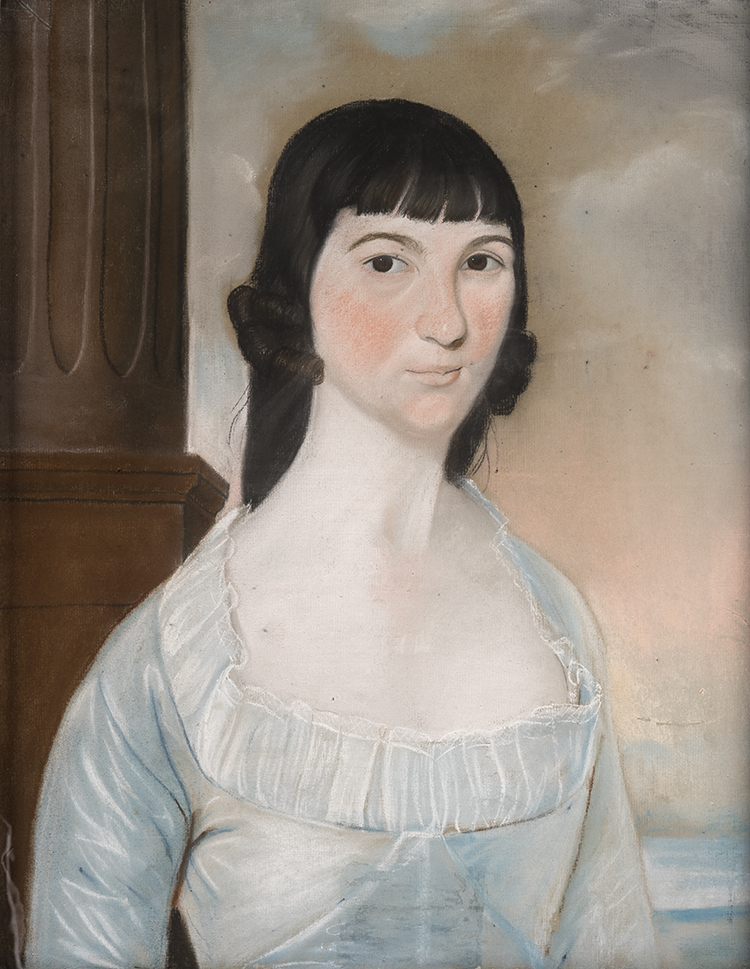
Jameson's second wife, Elizabeth Davenport (1769-1829)

When Washington called for 'Anderson' to be brought to him, the spy finally confessed that he was—in fact—British Major John André, envoy to the British commander in chief, Sir Henry Clinton, and the chief spy master for the British forces in America. The investigation further revealed that Benedict Arnold, as commandant of West Point, had agreed to surrender the fort to the enemy in return for a royal commission in the British army and a large sum of money. Because of Jameson's intuition, Arnold's plot was foiled, his misjudgment allowed Arnold to escape. In any case, the attempt to pass control of West Point to the British was thwarted.

== Later life and death ==
After the war, Jameson was awarded over 416 acres (1.68 km^{2}) of land, some of which was located in Greene County, Ohio. He owned many more thousands of acres of land throughout Virginia, Ohio, and Kentucky.

Jameson was a member of the Freemasonry chapter in Alexandria, Virginia. He was also a member of the Society of the Cincinnati, in Virginia, and was present at one of their meetings held in Richmond, Virginia on December 13, 1802, when it was voted to appropriate some of their funds (Note: funds to the amount of $25,000) to found Washington College in Chestertown, Maryland.

Jameson died on November 20, 1810, and was buried at the Culpeper Masonic Cemetery in Culpeper, Virginia.
