= 1779 Virginia gubernatorial election =

- June 1, 1779
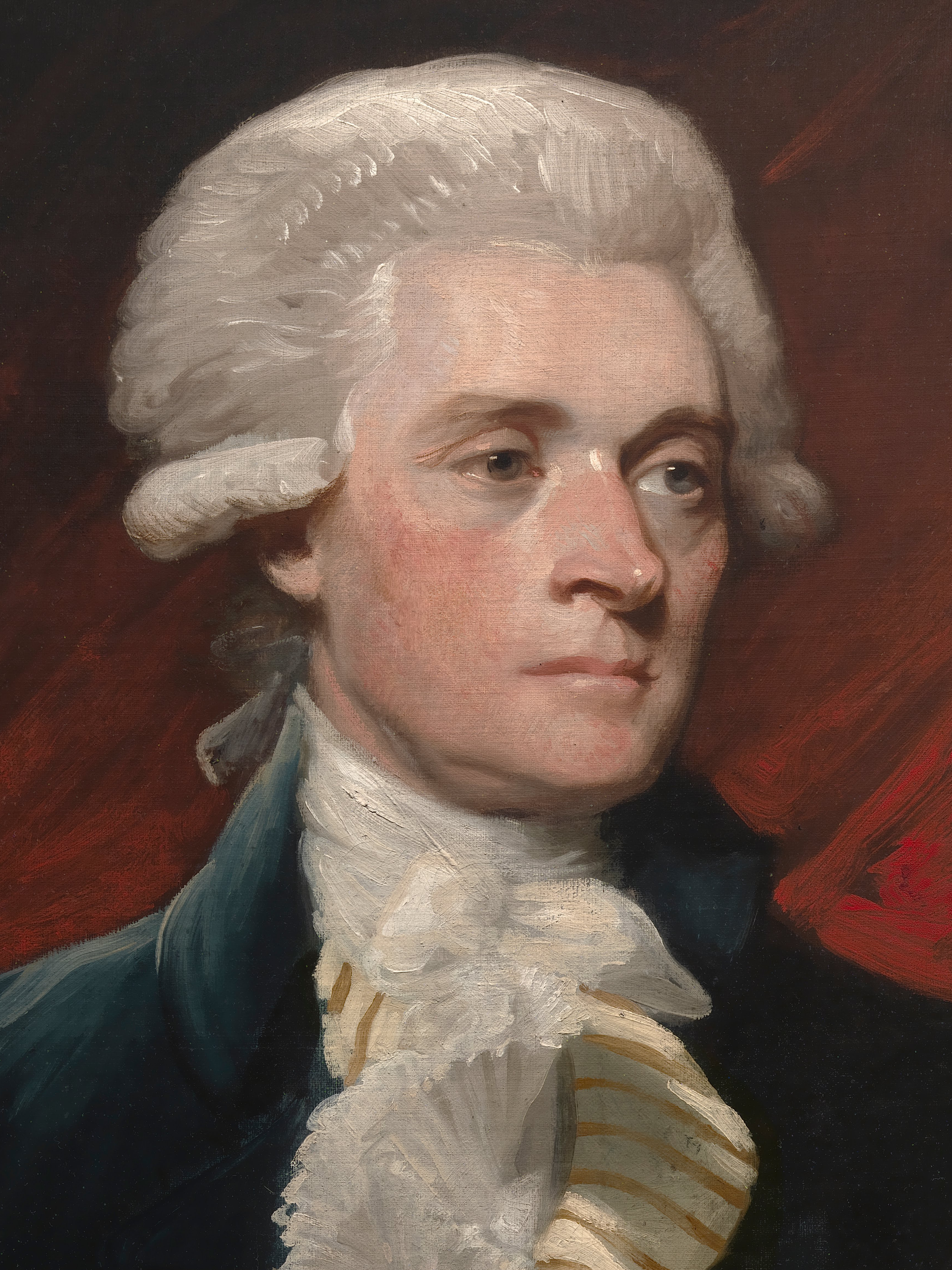

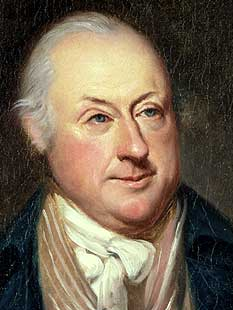

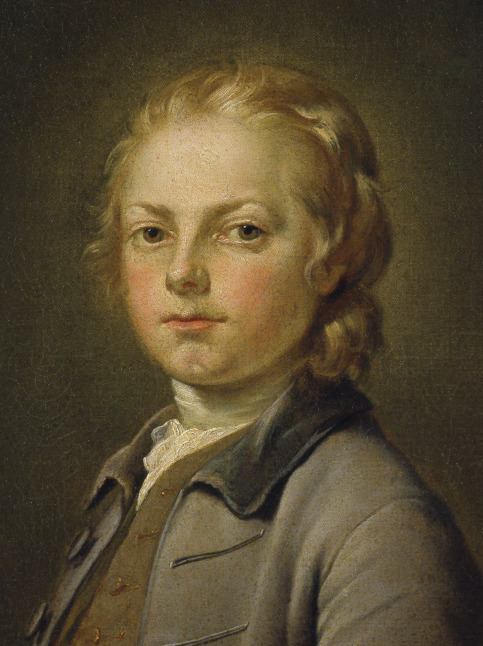
Nominee	Thomas Jefferson	John Page	Thomas Nelson Jr.
1st ballot	55	38	32
2nd ballot	67	61	Eliminated
Governor before election
Patrick Henry
Elected Governor
Thomas Jefferson

A gubernatorial election was held in Virginia on June 1, 1779. The delegate from Albemarle County Thomas Jefferson defeated the president of the Council of State John Page.

The incumbent governor of Virginia Patrick Henry was ineligible for re-election due to term limits established by the Constitution of Virginia. The election was conducted by the Virginia General Assembly in joint session. No candidate had a majority after the first count, requiring a second ballot between the two top-finishers.

== General election ==
1779 Virginia gubernatorial election
Candidate	First ballot		Second ballot	
Candidate	Count	Percent	Count	Percent
Thomas Jefferson	55	44.00	67	52.34
John Page	38	30.40	61	47.66
Thomas Nelson Jr.	32	25.60	Eliminated	
Total	125	100.00	128	100.00

== Bibliography ==
- State of Virginia (1827). Journal of the House of Delegates [...]. Richmond.
