= 1780 Virginia gubernatorial election =

- June 2, 1780
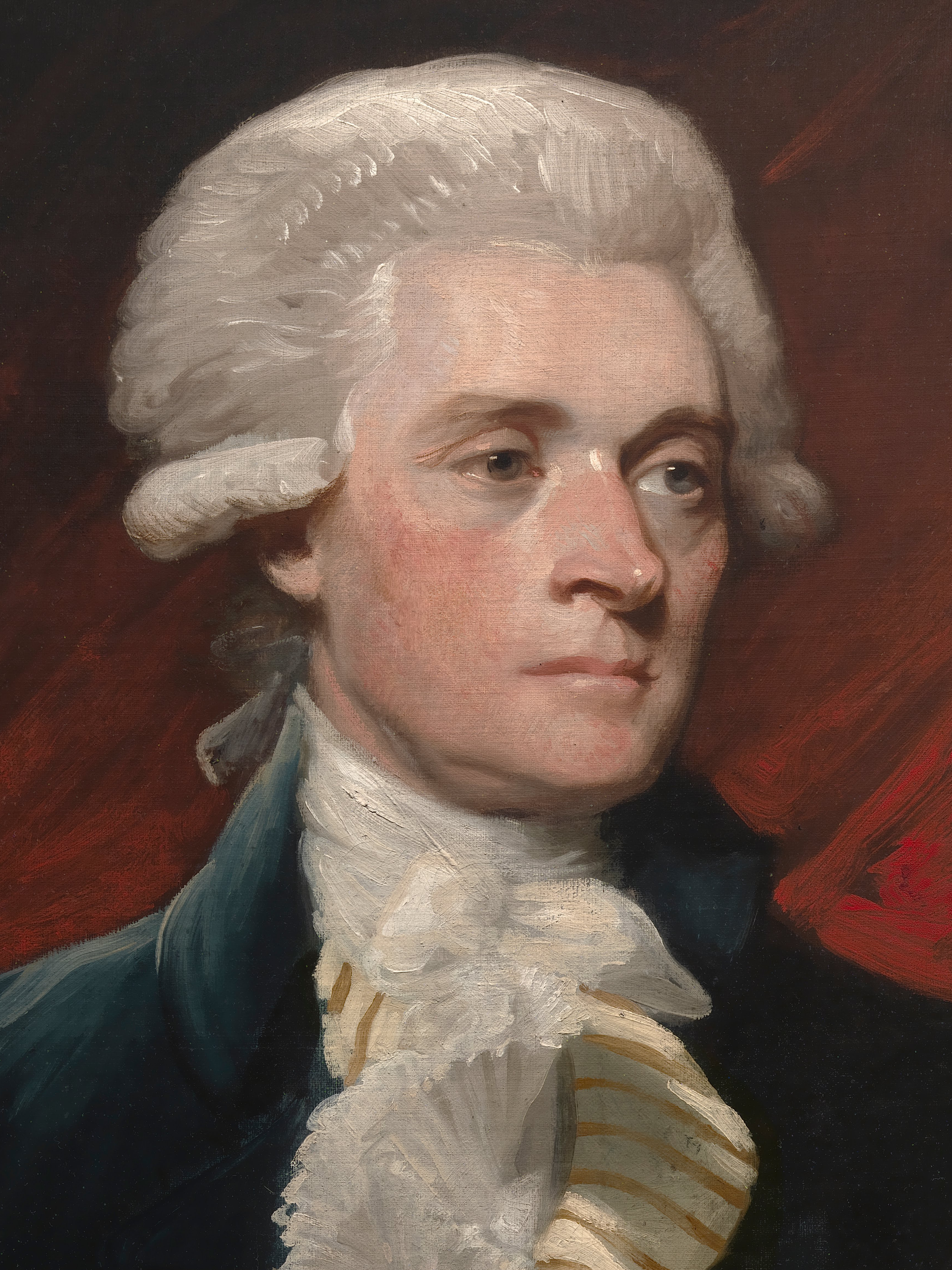
Nominee	Thomas Jefferson
Governor before election
Thomas Jefferson
Elected Governor
Thomas Jefferson

A gubernatorial election was held in Virginia on June 2, 1780. The incumbent governor of Virginia Thomas Jefferson was re-elected.

The Senate and the House of Delegates met separately on June 1 to nominate candidates for governor; more than one nomination was made, requiring a vote of the Virginia General Assembly. When the Assembly met in joint session the following day, Jefferson was selected by the majority of members on the first ballot, although the names of the other candidates and the votes tallied were not recorded.

== General election ==
1780 Virginia gubernatorial election
Candidate	First ballot	
Candidate	Count	Percent
Thomas Jefferson (incumbent)	**	
Total	**	100.00

== Bibliography ==
- State of Virginia (1827). Journal of the House of Delegates [...]. Richmond.
