= Daughters of the Cincinnati =

The Daughters of the Cincinnati
- Formation: December 27, 1894
- Type: 501(c)(3), lineage society
- Headquarters: 271 Madison Avenue #1408; New York City, New York, U.S.
- President: Louise Ducas
- Website: daughters1894.org

The Daughters of the Cincinnati is a historical, hereditary lineage organization founded in 1894 by women whose ancestors were officers in George Washington’s army and navy during the American Revolutionary War. Headquartered in New York City, the organization's activities are designed to expand and perpetuate the knowledge of the founding of the nation. In addition, the Daughters of the Cincinnati honor the contributions of their officer ancestors by giving college scholarships to the daughters of today's career military officers. Daughters of the Cincinnati is an approved lineage society, listed within the Hereditary Society Community of the United States of America.

== History ==
The Daughters of the Cincinnati was incorporated in New York State on December 27, 1894, more than a century after the founding of the Society of the Cincinnati, which does not allow female participants. They adopted the name "Cincinnati" without getting the approval of the Society of the Cincinnati, which is named after the ancient Roman hero Lucius Quinctius Cincinnatus.

=== Membership and organization ===
Membership was originally limited to women who were descended from a member of the Society of the Cincinnati or of an officer in the Continental Army or Navy who died while in service. There were 200 members as of 1923 and the secretary's address was 271 Madison Ave #1408, New York 10016.

The society has headquarters in New York and its members reside throughout the United States and in many foreign countries. All members of the Daughters of the Cincinnati are descendants of officers who were entitled to original membership in the Society of the Cincinnati founded in 1783.

=== Scholarships ===
Since 1906 the Daughters of the Cincinnati have provided scholarship funds to help hundreds of young women to pay their college tuition. Their flagship Military Stars college scholarship is awarded to female dependents of career military officers in the United States Army, Navy, Air Force, Marines, Coast Guard, and Space Force. Selection is based on both excellence and financial need. The Daughters of the Cincinnati is a 501(c)(3) non-profit organization.

== Activities ==
Historical lectures, trips, and projects have been presented by the Daughters of the Cincinnati to the membership since 1894. Daughters of the Cincinnati join in patriotic celebrations and historical programs with many other patriotic and heritage societies. In the 1970s, the Daughters of the Cincinnati collected original correspondence and portraits of their ancestor officers. These primary sources formed the core of a book, A Salute to Courage: The American Revolution as Seen Through Wartime Writings of Officers of the Continental Army and Navy from Documents Provided by The Daughters of the Cincinnati, edited by Dennis P. Ryan and published by Columbia University Press in 1979. One newspaper review commented "the book bridges two centuries with the words of those who were there and brings alive in modern eyes the hardships, horror, and patriotism of the Revolution."

== Notable members ==
- Sarah McKelley King (1921–2013), 33rd President General of the Daughters of the American Revolution
