= 1782 Virginia gubernatorial election =

- November 20, 1782
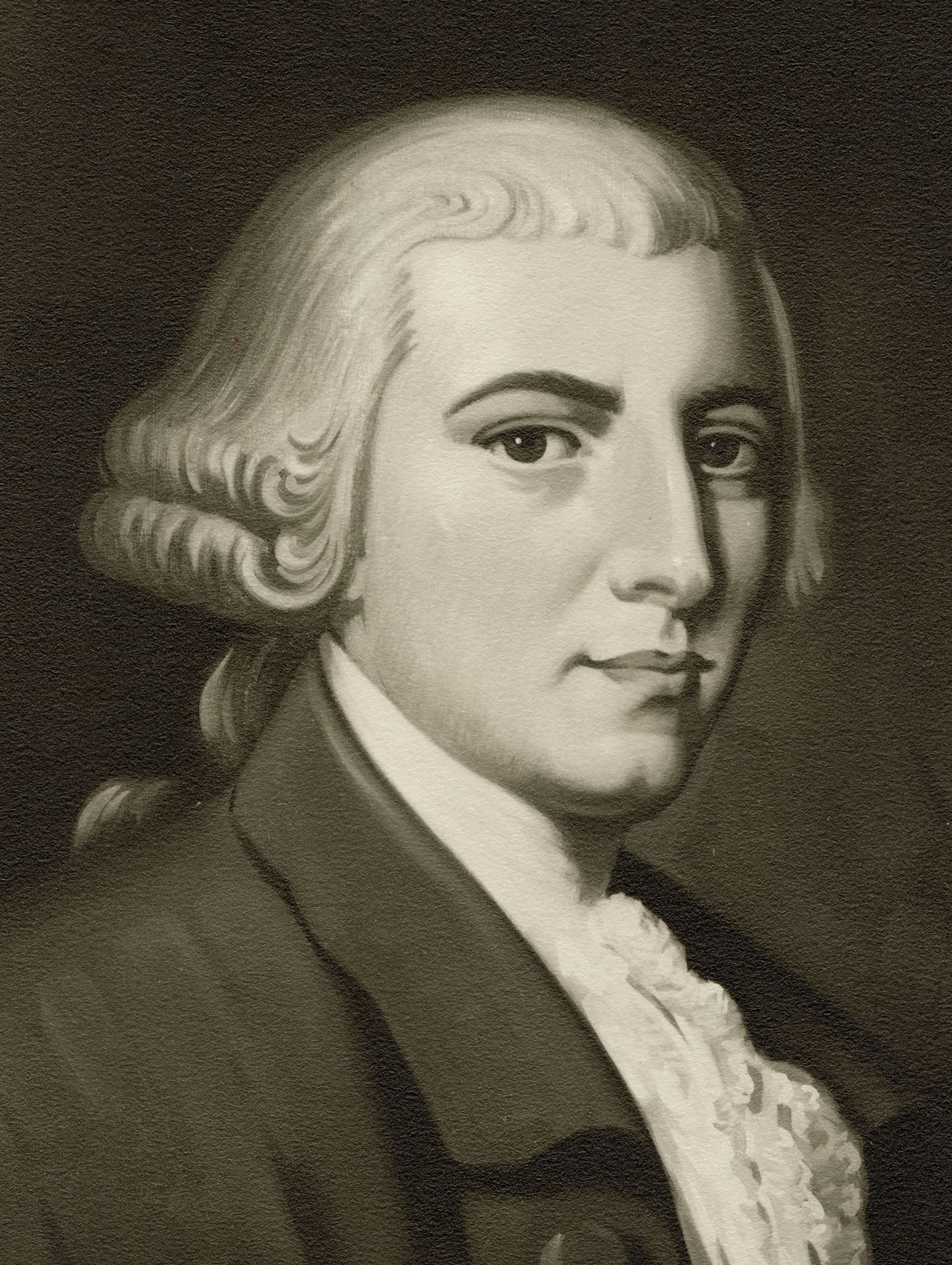
Nominee	Benjamin Harrison V
Governor before election
Benjamin Harrison V
Elected Governor
Benjamin Harrison V

A gubernatorial election was held in Virginia on November 20, 1782. The incumbent governor of Virginia Benjamin Harrison V was re-elected.

The election was conducted by the Virginia General Assembly in joint session. The House of Delegates met on November 19 to make nominations for governor and other offices, which the Senate accepted without amendment; the rule disqualifying votes for candidates other than those nominated was repealed prior to the balloting. Harrison was selected by a majority of members on the first ballot; the official record of the proceedings does not include the names or tallied votes for any other candidates.

== General election ==
1782 Virginia gubernatorial election
Candidate	First ballot	
Candidate	Count	Percent
Benjamin Harrison V (incumbent)	**	
Total	**	100.00

== Bibliography ==
- State of Virginia (1828). Journal of the House of Delegates [...]. Richmond.
