= George Wythe Munford =

American politician

George Wyeth Munford
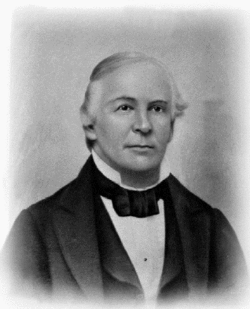

Member of the Virginia House of Delegates

Clerk of the Virginia House of Delegates
- In office 1825–1852
- Preceded by: William Munford (father)
- Succeeded by: St. George Tucker

Personal details
- Born: January 8, 1803 Richmond, Virginia
- Died: January 10, 1882 (aged 79) Richmond, Virginia
- Resting place: Hollywood Cemetery in Richmond, Virginia
- Party: Democratic Party
- Spouse(s): Lucy Singleton Taylor (m. 1828) and Elizabeth Thorogood Ellis (m. 1838)
- Children: 9 who reached adulthood, including Thomas T. Munford
- Parent(s): William Munford and Sally (née Radford) Munford
- Education: College of William & Mary (law)
- Occupation: Lawyer, legislator

Military service
- Commands: Richmond Light Infantry Blues of the 1st Virginia Infantry Regiment

George Wythe Munford (January 8, 1803 – January 10, 1882) worked in important governmental positions for the Commonwealth of Virginia for more than 50 years and served as the clerk of the Virginia House of Delegates for 25 years. He was the Clerk of the Virginia Constitutional Convention from 1829 to 1830. Munford was the Secretary of the Commonwealth from 1852 until the end of the Civil War. He published revisions to the Code of Virginia in 1860 and 1873.

After the Civil War, Munford worked for the United States Treasury as its first auditor and worked for the United States Census Bureau.

Munford served the Richmond Light Infantry Blues (of the 1st Virginia Infantry Regiment) twice as a commander, attaining the rank of colonel.

Munford hid John Brown's carpetbag of important correspondence and documents regarding his plans after the raid on Harpers Ferry in the Virginia State Capitol building in Richmond.

Three of his sons served for the Confederate States of America during the Civil War. Thomas served as a colonel and an acting brigadier general and William as lieutenant colonel. Lieutenant Charles Ellis died during the Battle of Malvern Hill. After the war, Munford established himself in Gloucester County, Virginia. He worked for the United States Treasury as its first auditor and the United States Census Bureau.

== Early life and education ==
Munford, born on January 8, 1803, in Richmond, Virginia, was the oldest son of William Munford, a distinguished citizen of Richmond, and Sally (née Radford) Munford. Munford was named for his father's friend George Wythe. Munford had seven siblings who reached adulthood, four brothers and three sisters. He received a bachelor's degree with honors and a law degree from the College of William & Mary.

== Career ==
=== Government ===
He assisted his father, the Clerk of the House of Delegates, until 1825, when Munford succeeded his father, gaining a good reputation for his work. He was the Clerk of the Virginia Constitutional Convention from 1829 to 1830, serving with James Madison, John Marshall, James Madison, and John Randolph. Munford was a Democrat.

For 12 years, Munford was the Secretary of the Commonwealth from December 1852 until the fall of the Confederate States of America. He published revisions to the Code of Virginia in 1860 and 1873. According to the Virginia Law Register, "he became more thoroughly acquainted with the political history of the State than any other man of his time."

After the Civil War, Munford worked for the committee on Courts of Justice in Gloucester County as a clerk. During his tenure there, he wrote about 90% of the bills passed into law. Munford worked for the United States Treasury as its first auditor and worked for the United States Census Bureau.

=== Military ===
Munford served the Richmond Light Infantry Blues (of the 1st Virginia Infantry Regiment) twice as a commander. He was a captain and reached the rank of colonel. He was the first president of the Blues Association.

=== Writer and lecturer ===
Munford wrote Two Parsons about Parsons Buchanon and Blair. He delivered a lecture in 1867 entitled Jewels of Virginia. The Two Parsons, with a number of his works, was published after his death in 1884.

== John Brown's carpetbag ==
John Brown had a carpetbag of important papers with him when he was arrested at Harpers Ferry. According to Prosecutor Andrew Hunter,

John Brown had with him when captured at Harpers Ferry a carpet-bag in which were his constitution for a provisional government and other papers. He had placed it in one corner of the engine house, and there it was found when the marines charged and captured the survivors. Mr. Hunter took possession of the carpet-bag and carried it to Charlestown. He kept it and its contents. He added to the papers the letters which were forwarded to the prisoners and not delivered to them. Ordinary letters were allowed to pass to the prisoners after Mr. Hunter had examined them. But those letters which seemed to contain information bearing upon the organization in the North, Mr. Hunter confiscated and kept. He had between seventy and eighty of these letters, and he placed them in John Brown's carpet-bag. Other important documents bearing upon the secret history of the case went into the same receptacle, and much of the matter nobody but Mr. Hunter saw.

There was correspondence from Frederick Douglass, Gerrit Smith, and likely Hugh Forbes. The carpet-bag also contained maps of Kentucky, North Carolina, and Virginia that showed the locations of State arsenals with proposed routes for attacks and retreats.

Hunter, a member of the Virginia State Senate, personally took the carpet-bag to Richmond. In 1865, when Lee advised that he could no longer defend Richmond, Hunter did not want the "Yankees" to find the carpet-bag. He thought that the Capitol was as safe a place as any in Richmond, and he asked Munford, Commonwealth Secretary at the time, if he could hide it in the Capitol. "Munford told me that he has taken the carpet-bag up to the cock-loft of the Capitol and had let down the bag between the wall and the plastering, and I believe those papers are there yet."

== Civil War ==
Munford had three sons who fought for the Confederate States of America during the Civil War. Thomas served as a colonel and an acting brigadier general and William as lieutenant colonel. Another son, Charles Ellis Munford, a lieutenant, died at the Battle of Malvern Hill (July 1, 1862). After the war, William became an Episcopalian minister and rector.

Munford lived in Gloucester County, Virginia at Elmington during the war. After the war, he was living in a house that he purchased along the Ware River. He sold his house on West Franklin Street in Richmond in 1866. Munford was an active member and secretary of the Southern Historical Society.

== Personal life ==
Munford first married Lucy Singleton Taylor on November 20, 1828, the daughter of Lucy Harrison (née Singleton) Taylor and Thomas Taylor of Richmond. They had two sons, Thomas T. Munford, born in 1831 and William Munford. Lucy died in June 1835.

Munford married Elizabeth Thorogood Ellis, daughter of Charles and Margaret (née Nimmo) Ellis of Richmond, on November 29, 1838. In 1938, Munford built a mansion at 1 West Franklin Street in Richmond. Their children were Charles Ellis; Robert; three daughters who married Charles H. Talbot, William S. Robertson, and William Rhett; and two unmarried daughters, Fannie (b. 1850) and Etta. Fannie and Etta, both who remained single throughout their lives, lived at 407 West Franklin Street for 60 years. After working as a teacher, Fannie was the superintendent of the Richmond Exchange for Women's Work from 1883, the year it was founded, for nearly 30 years.

== Death ==
Munford died in Richmond on January 10, 1882. His funeral was held at St. Paul's Episcopal Church in Richmond and he was buried at Hollywood Cemetery.

== Sources ==
- Taliaferro, James Lyons (1903). "Colonel George Wythe Munford". The Virginia Law Register. 8 (11): 783–786. doi:10.2307/1100563. ISSN 1547-1357. JSTOR 1100563.*
