= 1778 Virginia gubernatorial election =

- May 29, 1778 (unopposed)
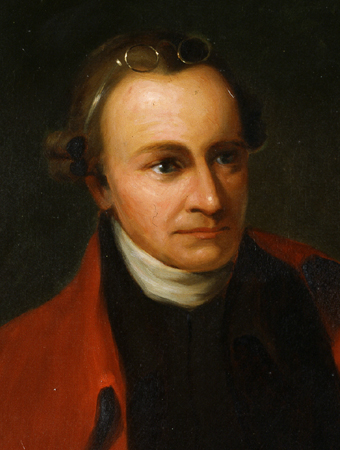
Nominee	Patrick Henry
Governor before election
Patrick Henry
Elected Governor
Patrick Henry

A gubernatorial election was scheduled to be held in Virginia on May 29, 1778. However, when the Virginia General Assembly met to conduct the election, the incumbent governor of Virginia Patrick Henry was the only candidate nominated. By a joint resolution of the Senate and House of Delegates, balloting was dispensed with and Henry was declared re-elected by acclamation.

== General election ==
1778 Virginia gubernatorial election
Candidate	First ballot	
Candidate	Count	Percent
Patrick Henry (incumbent)	**	
Total	**	100.00

== Bibliography ==
- State of Virginia (1827). Journal of the House of Delegates [...]. Richmond.
