= 1791 Virginia gubernatorial election =

- November 2, 1791

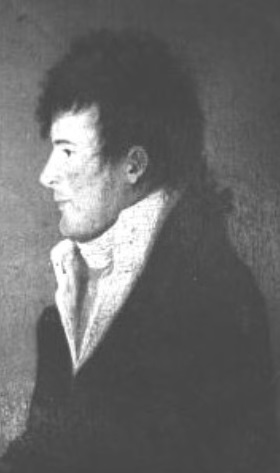

Nominee	Henry Lee III	James Wood	Robert Harvey
1st ballot	87	50	20
Governor before election
Beverley Randolph
Elected Governor
Henry Lee III

A gubernatorial election was held in Virginia on November 2, 1791. The former delegate to the Confederation Congress Henry Lee III defeated the member of the Council of State James Wood and Robert Harvey.

The incumbent governor of Virginia Beverley Randolph was ineligible for re-election due to term limits established by the Constitution of Virginia. The election was conducted by the Virginia General Assembly in joint session. Lee defeated Wood and Harvey on the first ballot.

== General election ==
1791 Virginia gubernatorial election
Candidate	First ballot	
Candidate	Count	Percent
Henry Lee III	87	50.96
James Wood	50	31.85
Robert Harvey	20	12.74
Total	157	100.00

== Bibliography ==
- Lampi, Philip J. (2012). "Virginia 1791 Governor". A New Nation Votes. American Antiquarian Society.
- Sobel, Robert; Raimo, John (1978). Biographical Directory of the Governors of the United States 1789–1978. Vol. 4. Westport, CT: Meckler Books.
