= Ware River (Virginia) =

Coordinates: 37°22′12″N 76°25′55″W

Location
- Country: United States

Physical characteristics
- Source
  - location: Virginia

The Ware River is a 9-mile-long (14 km) tidal river in the U.S. state of Virginia. It is an arm of Mobjack Bay, part of the Chesapeake Bay estuary system.

== See also ==
- List of rivers of Virginia
