= 1786 Virginia gubernatorial election =

- November 7, 1786
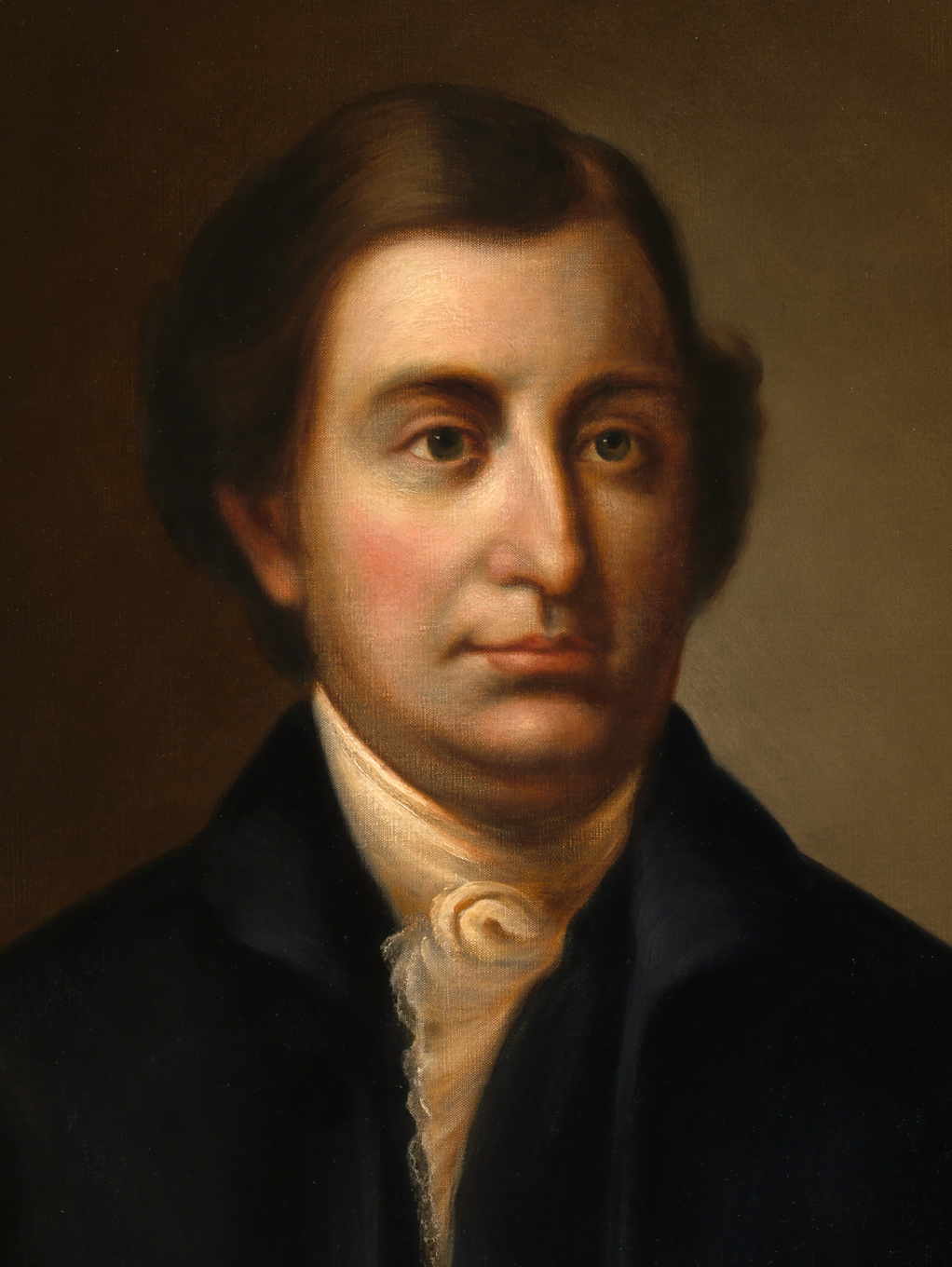

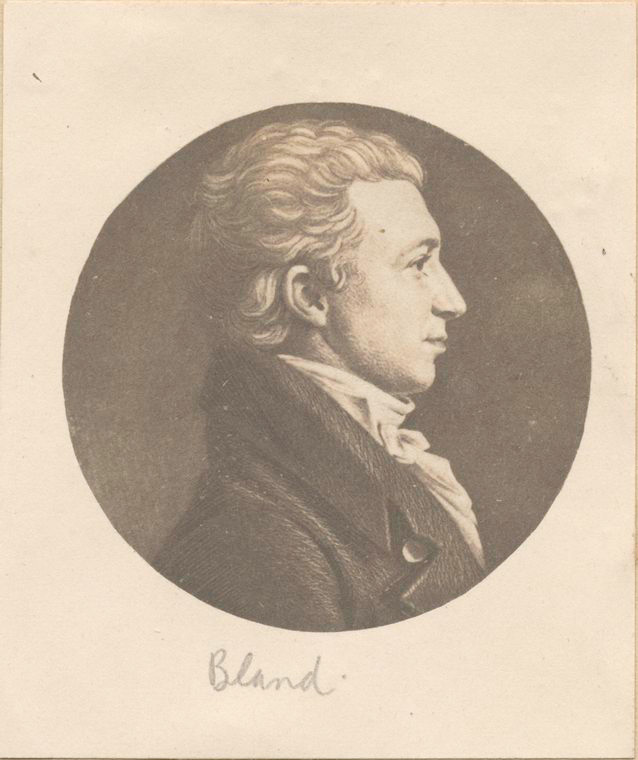

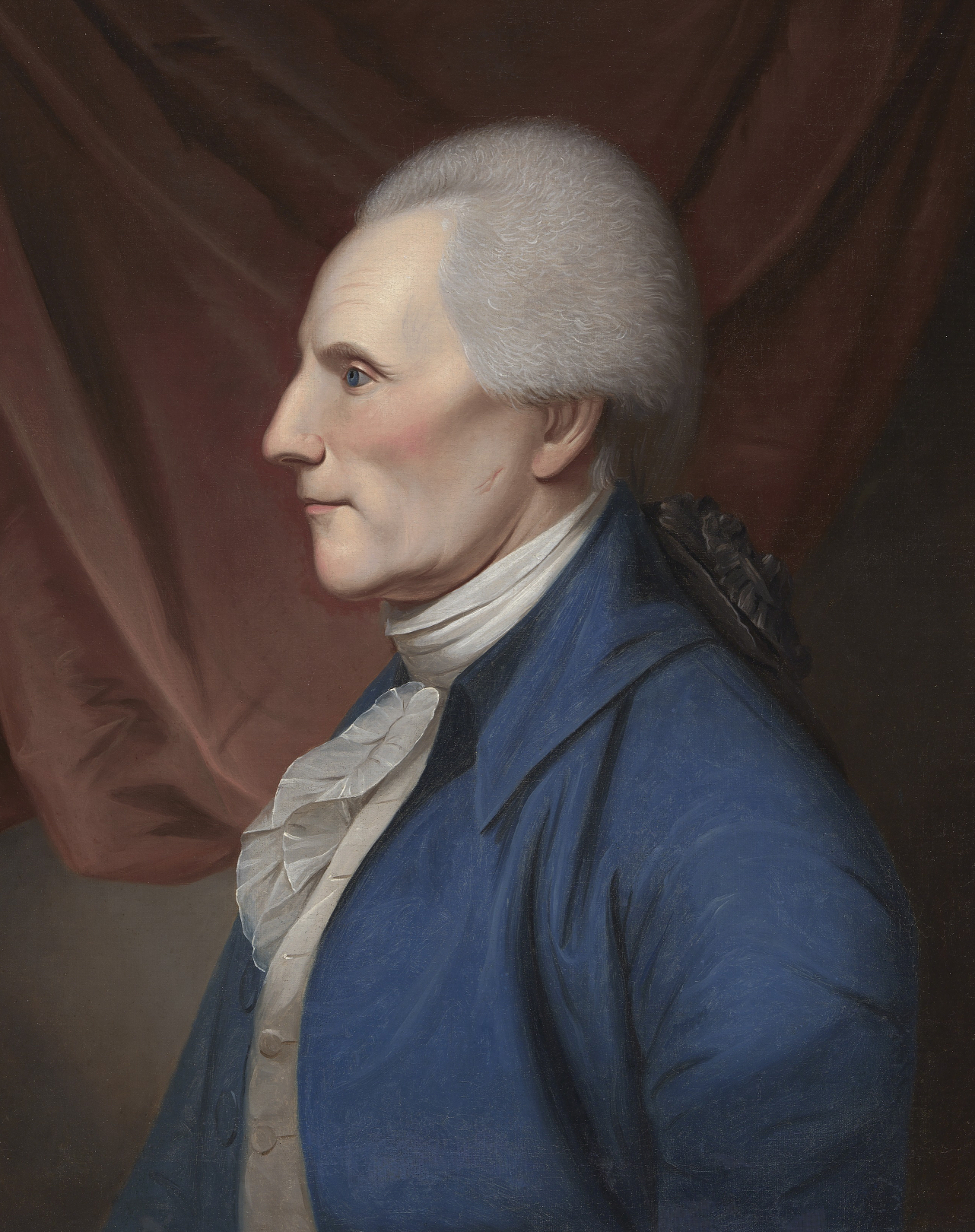
Nominee	Edmund Randolph	Theodorick Bland	Richard Henry Lee
Party	Federalists	Anti-Federalists	Anti-Federalists
Governor before election
Patrick Henry
Anti-Federalists
Elected Governor
Edmund Randolph
Federalists

A gubernatorial election was held in Virginia on November 7, 1786. The attorney general of Virginia Edmund Randolph defeated the member of the Virginia House of Delegates from Prince George County Theodorick Bland and the U.S. congressional delegate from Virginia Richard Henry Lee.

The incumbent governor of Virginia Patrick Henry declined to seek re-election. Randolph was a supporter of the Annapolis Convention and was considered a likely candidate to succeed Henry when the legislature met in October. Bland was "an ally of Henry and an Antifederalist," while Randolph was aligned with the nationalist faction headed by James Madison.

The election was conducted by the Virginia General Assembly in joint session. Randolph was elected by a large majority on the first ballot.

== General election ==
1786 Virginia gubernatorial election
Party	Candidate	First ballot	
Party	Candidate	Count	Percent
Federalists	Edmund Randolph	**	
Anti-Federalists	Theodorick Bland	**	
Anti-Federalists	Richard Henry Lee	**	
Total		**	100.00

== Bibliography ==
- Campbell, Norine Dickson (1969). Patrick Henry: Patriot and Statesman. New York: Devin-Adair Company.
- Reardon, John J. (1975). Edmund Randolph: A Biography. New York: Macmillan Publishing Company.
- Risjord, Norman K.; DenBoer, Gordon (March 1974). "The Evolution of Political Parties in Virginia, 1782-1800". Journal of American History. 60 (4): 961–84.
