= William Roscoe Wilson Curl =

American judge

William Roscoe Wilson Curl was a Virginia lawyer and judge. Born in Tidewater, Virginia, Curl studied law and then practiced in the county courts. He was made a judge of the Court of Admiralty in 1777 and thus automatically became a justice of the first Virginia Court of Appeals (now the Supreme Court of Virginia). He died a short time later, by February 1782.
