= 1815 Virginia gubernatorial election =

- December 8, 1815
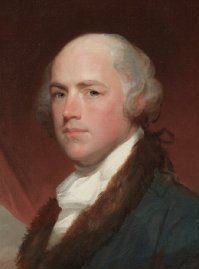
Nominee	Wilson Cary Nicholas
Governor before election
Wilson Cary Nicholas
Democratic-Republican
Elected Governor
Wilson Cary Nicholas
Democratic-Republican (Note: Lampi lists no parties for this election. Both Kallenbach and Kallenbach and Sobel and Raimo list Nicholas as a Democratic-Republican during his tenure.)

A gubernatorial election was held in Virginia on December 8, 1815. The incumbent governor of Virginia Wilson Cary Nicholas was re-elected without opposition.

The election was conducted by the Virginia General Assembly in joint session. Nicholas was elected with a majority on the first ballot.

== General election ==
1815 Virginia gubernatorial election
Candidate	First ballot	
Candidate	Count	Percent
Wilson Cary Nicholas (incumbent)	**	
Total	**	100.00

== Bibliography ==
- Kallenbach, Joseph E.; Kallenbach, Jessamine S. (1977). American State Governors, 1776–1976. Vol. 1. Dobbs Ferry, NY: Oceana Publications.
- Lampi, Philip J. (2012). "Virginia 1815 Governor". A New Nation Votes. American Antiquarian Society.
- Sobel, Robert; Raimo, John (1978). Biographical Directory of the Governors of the United States 1789–1978. Vol. 4. Westport, CT: Meckler Books.
- Virginia (1815). Journal of the House of Delegates [...]. Richmond.
