= June 1781 Virginia gubernatorial election =

- June 12, 1781
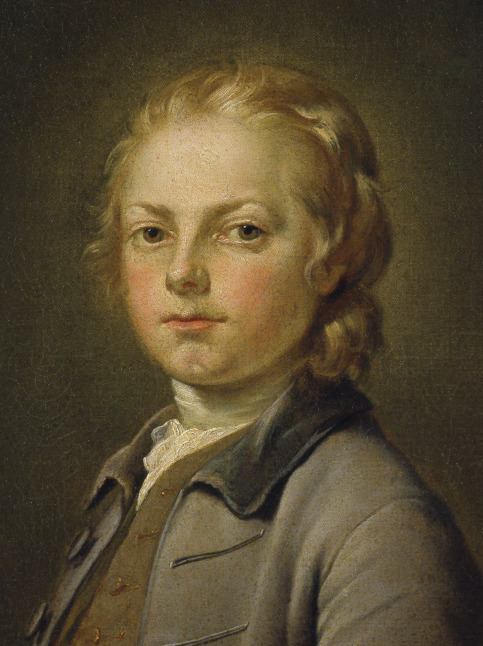
Nominee	Thomas Nelson Jr.
Governor before election
William Fleming (acting)
Elected Governor
Thomas Nelson Jr.

A gubernatorial election was held in Virginia on June 12, 1781. The delegate from York County Thomas Nelson Jr. was elected.

The incumbent governor of Virginia Thomas Jefferson declined to seek re-election. Jefferson's constitutional term ended on June 2, the date the election of his successor was scheduled to take place. The normal election proceedings were disrupted by the Yorktown campaign, however, and the Virginia General Assembly was forced to flee Richmond to evade the advancing British forces. The Assembly relocated to Charlottesville and then to Staunton. Nelson's past military experience made him a desirable candidate in light of the British invasion. Jefferson wrote that the emergency called for "a union of the civil and military power in the same hands." Others felt more drastic constitutional changes were necessary. When the Assembly reconvened at Staunton on June 7, the delegate from Albemarle County George Nicholas and the delegate from Henry County Patrick Henry suggested that either George Washington or Nathanael Greene should be appointed dictator. The Assembly rejected this proposal and proceeded to elect a governor on June 12 after five days of delay. Nelson was selected by the majority of members in joint session; the names of the other candidates and the votes tallied were not recorded.

== General election ==
June 1781 Virginia gubernatorial election
Candidate	First ballot	
Candidate	Count	Percent
Thomas Nelson Jr.	**	
Total	**	100.00

== Bibliography ==
- Evans, Emory G. (1975). Thomas Nelson of Yorktown: Revolutionary Virginian. Williamsburg, VA: Colonial Williamsburg Foundation.
- Meacham, Jon (2012). Thomas Jefferson: The Art of Power. New York: Random House Trade Paperbacks.
- State of Virginia (1828). Journal of the House of Delegates [...]. Richmond.
