= David Jameson (politician) =

American merchant and politician

Acting Governor of Virginia
- In office November 22, 1781 – December 1, 1781
- Preceded by: Thomas Nelson, Jr.
- Succeeded by: Benjamin Harrison V

Member of the Virginia Senate from Elizabeth City, Warwick and York Counties
- In office May 7, 1781 – May 4, 1783
- Preceded by: John Cary
- Succeeded by: William Lee

Member of the Virginia Governor's Council

Member of the Virginia Senate from Elizabeth City, Warwick and York Counties
- In office October 7, 1776 – December 1776
- Preceded by: position created
- Succeeded by: Augustine Moore

Personal details
- Born: 1723 Essex County, Colony of Virginia, British America
- Died: July 10, 1793 (aged 69–70)

David Jameson (1723 – July 10, 1793) was an American merchant and politician who briefly served the acting Governor of Virginia in November 1781, during an illness of Virginia governor Thomas Nelson, Jr..

== Early life and education ==
Coat of Arms of David Jameson

Jameson was born at St. Anne’s Parish in Essex County in 1723, the son of James Jameson and his wife. His family included at least one brother, Thomas, who moved to frontier Culpeper County, served in the Revolutionary War and sired sons David (who represented Culpeper County in the Virginia house of Delegates 1789-1790) and John. This David Jameson attended the College of New Jersey (now Princeton University).

== Career ==
Jameson became a prominent merchant in Yorktown, as well as an inventor. In 1773 he was elected treasurer of the "Society for the Promotion of Useful Knowledge" organized at Williasburg with John Clayton as president, and later John Page.

During the initial session of the Virginia State Senate during the Revolutionary War, Jameson represented Elizabeth City, Warwick and York Counties from October 7, 1776 until he resigned because fellow legislators elected him to serve on Patrick Henry's Privy Council. However, some confusion exists as to his exact position because Virginia's first constitution elimitated the Governor's Council of colonial times, and the position of lieutenant governor described below was only created by Virginia's Constitution of 1850.

Jameson served from 1780 to 1781 as lieutenant governor under Thomas Nelson, Jr. (signer of the United States Declaration of Independence) and briefly served as Governor in August 1781 when Nelson took ill, before the ascension of Benjamin Harrison V to the office.

In 1783, Jameson was again elected to the Virginia State Senate.

== Personal life ==
Jameson wed Mildred Smith, the marriage produced no children..

== Death and legacy ==
Jameson died on July 10, 1793. His will dated October 14, 1792 was admitted to probate on July 2, 1793.
