= Virginia in the American Revolution =

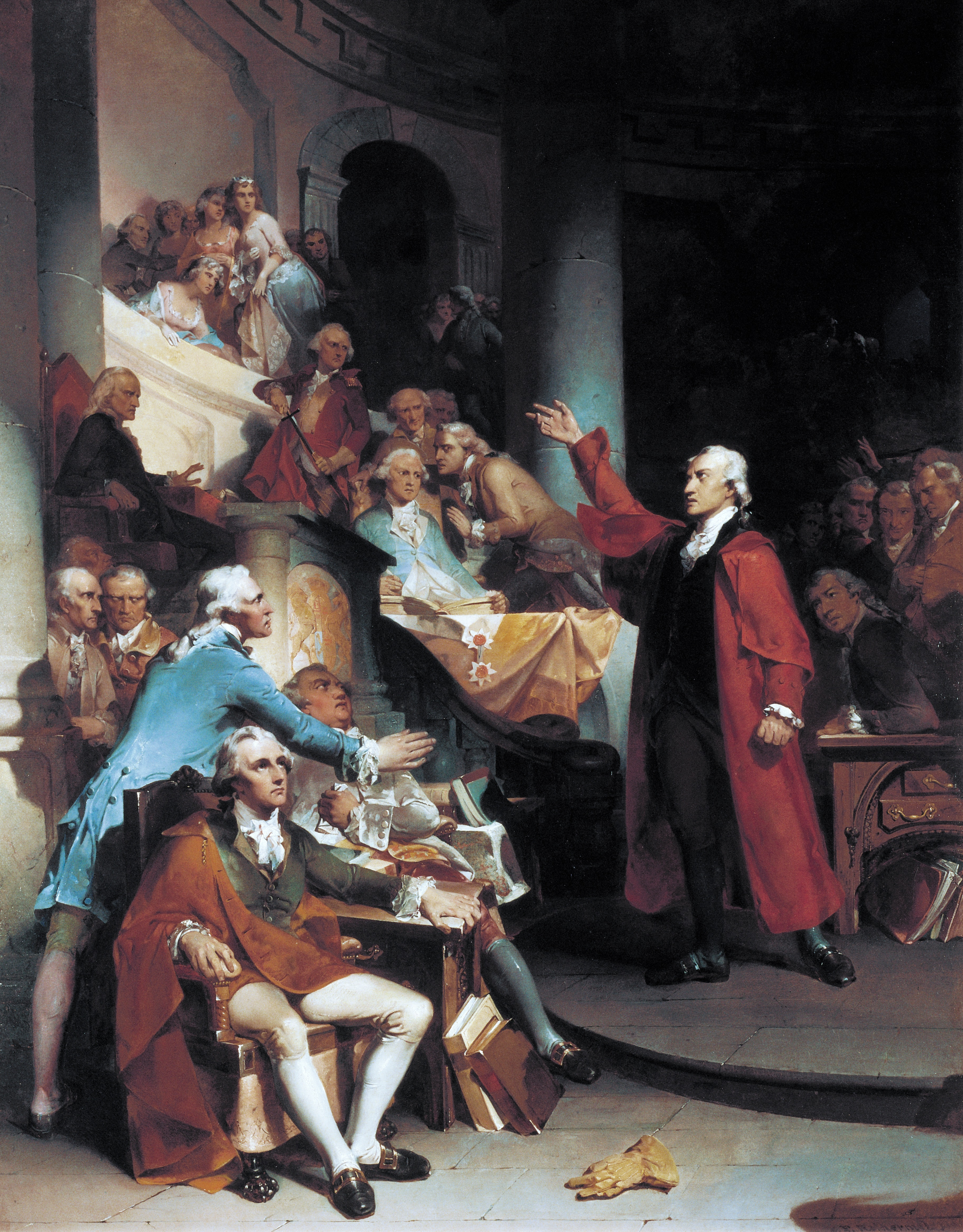
1851 painting of Patrick Henry's speech on the Virginia Resolves

The history of Virginia in the American Revolution begins with the role the Colony of Virginia played in early dissent against the British government and culminates with the defeat of General Cornwallis by the allied forces at the Siege of Yorktown in 1781, which signaled the effective military end to the conflict. Numerous Virginians played key roles in the Revolution, including George Washington, Patrick Henry, and Thomas Jefferson.

== Antecedents ==
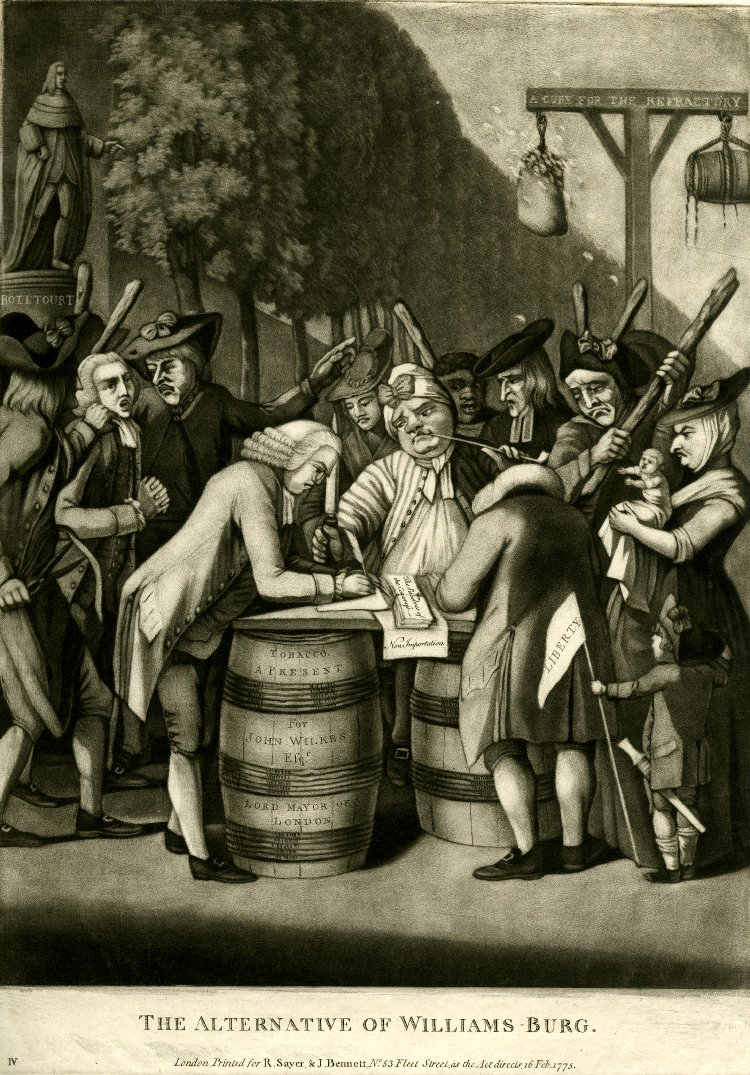
"The Alternative of Williamsburg", 2220, showing a satirical view of affairs in the colony of loyalists being intimidated to join the Virginia Association

Revolutionary sentiments first began appearing in Virginia shortly after the French and Indian War ended in 1763. The same year, the British and Virginian governments clashed in the Parson's Cause. The Virginia legislature had passed the Two-Penny Act to stop clerical salaries from inflating. King George III vetoed the measure, and clergy sued for back salaries. Patrick Henry first came to prominence by arguing in the case against the veto, which he declared tyrannical.

The British government had accumulated a great deal of debt through spending on its wars. To help pay off this debt, Parliament passed the Sugar Act in 1764 and the Stamp Act in 1765. The General Assembly opposed the passage of the Sugar Act on the grounds of no taxation without representation. Patrick Henry opposed the Stamp Act in the Burgesses with a famous speech advising George III that "Caesar had his Brutus, Charles I his Cromwell..." and the king "may profit by their example." The legislature passed the Virginia Resolves opposing the tax. Governor Francis Fauquier responded by dismissing the Assembly.

Opposition continued after the resolves. The Northampton County court overturned the Stamp Act February 8, 1766. Various political groups including the Sons of Liberty met and issued protests against the act. Most notably, Richard Bland published a pamphlet entitled An Enquiry into the Rights of the British Colonies. This document would set one of the basic political principles of the Revolution by stating that Virginia was a part of the British Empire, not the Kingdom of Great Britain, so it only owed allegiance to the Crown, not Parliament.

The Stamp Act was repealed, but additional taxation from the Revenue Act and the 1769 attempt to transport Bostonian rioters to London for trial incited more protest from Virginia. The Assembly met to consider resolutions condemning on the transport of the rioters, but Governor Botetourt, while sympathetic, dissolved the legislature. The Burgesses reconvened in Raleigh Tavern and made an agreement to ban British imports. Britain gave up the attempt to extradite the prisoners and lifted all taxes except the tax on tea in 1770.

In 1773, because of a renewed attempt to extradite Americans to Britain, Richard Henry Lee, Thomas Jefferson, Patrick Henry, George Mason, and others created Committees of Correspondence that helped build support for what ultimately became the American Revolution. Unlike other such committees of correspondence, this one was an official part of the legislature.

Following the closure of the port in Boston and several other offenses, the Burgesses approved June 1, 1774 as a day of "Fasting, Humiliation, and Prayer" in a show of solidarity with Massachusetts. The Governor, Lord Dunmore, dismissed the legislature. The first Virginia Convention was held at Raleigh Tavern August 1–6 to respond to the growing crisis. The convention approved a boycott of British goods, expressed solidarity with Massachusetts, and elected delegates to the Continental Congress where Virginian Peyton Randolph was selected as president of the Congress.

== War begins ==
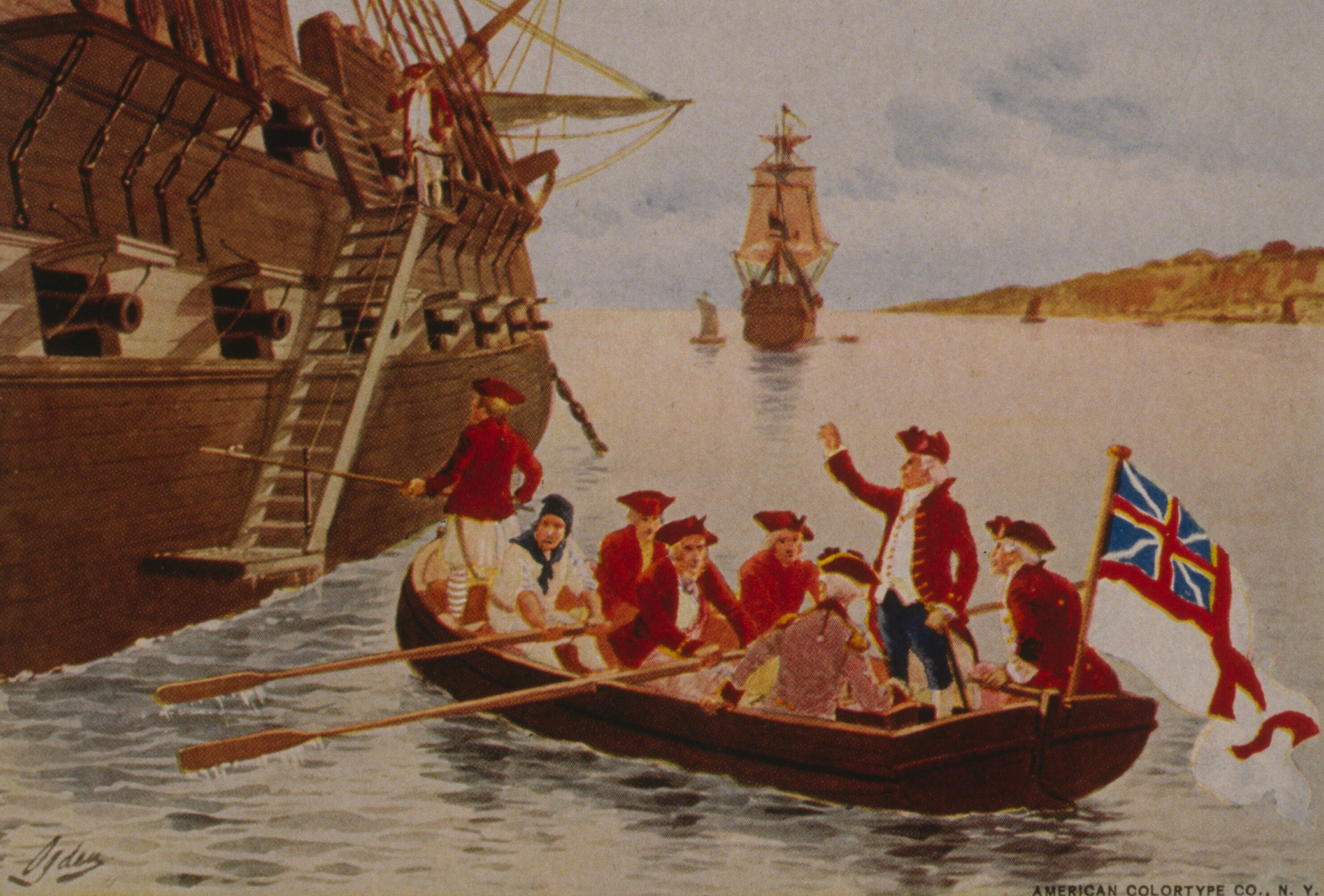
Lord Dunmore fleeing to HMS Fowey on 8 June 1775

On April 20, 1775, a day after the Battle of Lexington and Concord, Dunmore ordered royal marines to remove the gunpowder from the Williamsburg magazine to a British ship. Patrick Henry led a group of Virginia militia from Hanover in opposition to Dunmore's order. Carter Braxton negotiated a resolution to the Gunpowder Incident by transferring royal funds as payment for the powder. The incident exacerbated Dunmore's declining popularity. He fled the Governor's Palace to the British ship HMS Fowey at Yorktown. On November 7, Dunmore issued a proclamation declaring Virginia was in a state of rebellion and that any slave fighting for the British would be freed. By this time, George Washington had been appointed head of the American forces by the Continental Congress and Virginia was under the political leadership of a Committee of Safety formed by the Third Virginia Convention in the governor's absence.

On December 9, 1775, Virginia militia moved on the governor's forces at the Battle of Great Bridge. The British had held Fort Murray, which guarded the land route to Norfolk. The British feared the militia, who had no cannon for a siege, would receive reinforcements, so they abandoned the fort and attacked. The militia won the 30-minute battle. Dunmore responded by bombarding Norfolk with his ships on January 1, 1776.

After the Battle of Great Bridge, little military conflict took place on Virginia soil for the first part of the American Revolutionary War. Nevertheless, Virginia sent forces to help in the fighting to the North and South, including Daniel Morgan and his company of marksmen who fought in early battles in the north. Charlottesville served as a prison camp for the Convention Army, Hessian and British soldiers captured at Saratoga. Virginia also sent forces to its frontier in the northwest, which then included much of the Ohio Country. George Rogers Clark led forces in this area and captured the fort at Kaskaskia and won the Battle of Vincennes, capturing the royal governor, Henry Hamilton. Clark maintained control of areas south of the Ohio River for most of the war, but was unable to make gains in the Indian-dominated territories north of the river.

== Independence ==
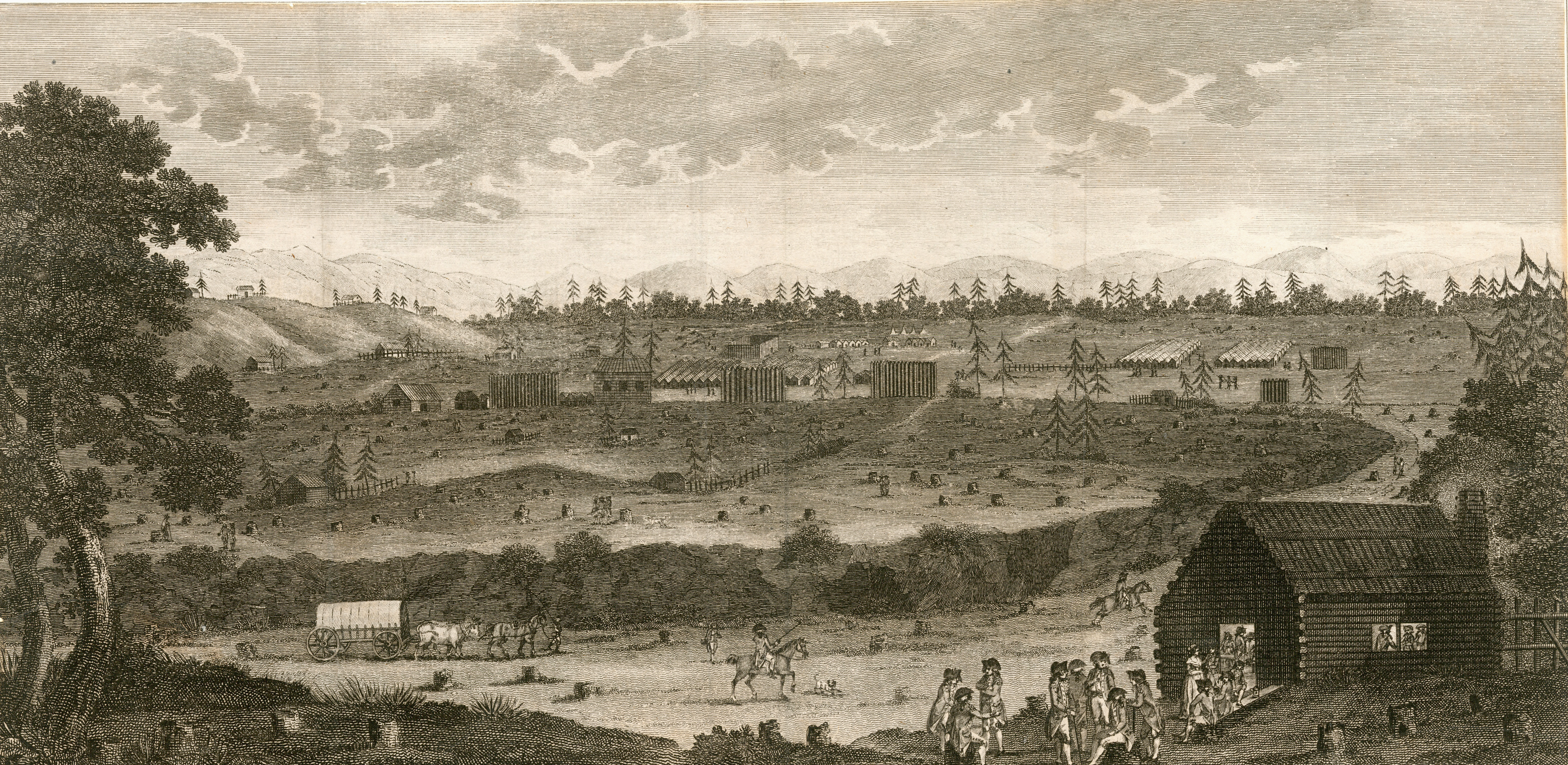
Encampment of the convention army at Charlotte Ville in Virginia. Etching from 1789.

The Fifth Virginia Convention met on May 6, 1776 and declared Virginia a free and independent state on May 15, 1776. The convention instructed its delegates to introduce a resolution for independence at the Continental Congress. Richard Henry Lee introduced the measure on June 7. While the Congress debated, the Virginia Convention adopted George Mason's Bill of Rights (June 12) and a constitution (June 29) which established an independent commonwealth. Congress approved Lee's proposal on July 2 and approved Jefferson's Declaration of Independence on July 4.

The constitution of the Fifth Virginia Convention created a system of government for the state that would last for 54 years. The constitution provided for a chief magistrate, a bicameral legislature with both the House of Delegates and the Senate. The legislature elected a governor each year (picking Patrick Henry to be the first) and a council of eight for executive functions. In October, the legislature appointed Jefferson, Edmund Pendleton, and George Wythe to adopt the existing body of Virginia law to the new constitution.

== Social Conflict Between Class and Race ==
During the American Revolution, Virginia was not a united colony. The war challenged the power of the gentry because ordinary Virginians wanted a larger role in deciding how the war was run, often using the Revolution’s republican ideas to support their demands. Many poor white men expected to elect their officers and to have a voice in how the militia was used, rather than simply following elite commands.

At the beginning of mobilization, some local militias allowed ordinary men to elect their officers, and some of them pushed to elect leaders from their own communities to have a fairer system. These men spoke about liberty and rights to argue that they should take part in militia decisions, which worried many elites who were used to controlling politics and military roles. As militias became more active, some companies pushed for stronger actions against British authority and suspected loyalists. Elites worried that if armed commoners acted this boldly, they might also challenge the colony’s social hierarchy and elite power. In response to this, many leaders reorganized the military to reduce local control and stop open elections of officers to restore power to the elites.

Creating the minutemen regiments was a major part of this reorganization. Originally, the minutemen were meant to be a people’s force who could respond quickly to threats across Virginia. However, the system became quite hierarchical. Officers were appointed by elites instead of elected which meant they were no longer unbiased citizens from the community. Officers earned much higher pay and had increased power to command and discipline their men. Junior officers made several times a private’s daily pay, while captains and field officers earned even more. This further increased the gap between them and the ordinary men, slowly taking more power from the poorer folks. McDonnell notes that replacing elected militia officers with appointed minutemen leaders and paying people unequally showed a clear move away from popular control and toward stronger elite authority.

These changes directly affected class divisions. Minutemen recruitment fell mostly on poorer farmers and laborers, who had to leave their fields and families for long periods while receiving less pay than officers. Not only this but spending time away meant losing money and small farmers had no way to “buy their way out” as the elites could. Farming was their primary source of income, and since there was often no help at home, their absence threatened their families’ basic survival. McDonnell explains that this unequal burden made poorer men view service as dangerous to their basic survival needs and further enforced the belief that “gentlemen or men of fortune ought to bear the expense and difficulties of defending the colony” instead of transferring the costs onto those with the least to spare.

As poor Virginians saw that they took on most of the risks while officers and wealthy men celebrated the benefits, the recruitment levels for the minutemen rapidly declined. There were reports across Virginia describing how recruiting was slow, and there were incomplete units. Training attendance went down and recruitment quotas became harder to meet, causing many leaders to struggle to maintain the small units they had. McDonnell suggests that this decline was linked to a growing belief that the Revolution’s promises of shared sacrifice and political voice were not being met, arguing that the minutemen system revealed deep divisions between elites and poorer whites. It becomes apparent that the dwindling enlistment and resistance to the minutemen system explains why Virginia’s war contribution weakened and why class and racial conflict remained key to the colony’s Revolution.

== War returns to Virginia ==
The British brought the war back to coastal Virginia in May 1779 when Admiral George Collier landed troops at Hampton Roads and used Portsmouth (after destroying the naval yard) as a base of attack. This was known as the Chesapeake raid. The move was part of an attempted blockade of trade with the West Indies. The British abandoned the plan when reinforcements from General Henry Clinton failed to arrive to support Collier.

=== Raid of Richmond ===
Fearing the vulnerability of Williamsburg, then-Governor Thomas Jefferson moved the capital farther inland to Richmond in 1780. That October, the British made another attempt at invading Virginia. British General Alexander Leslie entered the Chesapeake with 2,500 troops and used Portsmouth as a base; however, after the British defeat at the Battle of Kings Mountain, Leslie moved to join General Charles Cornwallis farther south.

In December, Benedict Arnold, who had betrayed the Patriot/Continental movement and was afterwards positioned as a General in the British Army, attacked Richmond with a militia of Loyalists as well as Hessian mercenaries and an army of British Regulars. Jefferson fled the capital city and called out militia under Colonel Sampson Mathews to harass Arnold's forces. They burned much of the city before withdrawing to Portsmouth, burning and looting along the James River as they went.

=== Yorktown Campaign ===
Arnold moved his base of operations to Portsmouth and was later joined by another 2,000 troops under General William Phillips. Phillips led an expedition that destroyed military and economic targets, against ineffectual militia resistance. The state's defenses, led by General Friedrich Wilhelm, Baron von Steuben, put up resistance in the April 1781 Battle of Blandford, but was forced to retreat.

George Washington sent the French General Lafayette to lead the defense of Virginia. Lafayette marched south to Petersburg, preventing Phillips from immediately taking the town. Cornwallis, frustrated in the Carolinas, moved up from North Carolina to join Phillips and Arnold, and began to pursue Lafayette's smaller force. Lafayette only had 3,200 troops to face Cornwallis's 7,200. The outnumbered Lafayette avoided direct confrontation and could do little more than annoy Cornwallis with a series of skirmishes. Lafayette retreated to Fredericksburg, met up with General Anthony Wayne, and then marched into the southwest. Cornwallis dispatched two smaller missions: 500 soldiers under Colonel John Graves Simcoe to take the arsenal at Point of Fork and 250 under Colonel Banastre Tarleton to march on Charlottesville and capture Gov. Jefferson and the legislature. The expedition to Point of Fork forced Steuben to retreat further while Tarleton's mission captured only seven legislators and some officers. Jack Jouett had ridden all night ride to warn Jefferson and the legislators of Tarleton's coming. Cornwallis reunited his army in Elk Hill and marched to the Tidewater region. Lafayette, uniting with von Steuben, now had 5,000 troops and followed Cornwallis.

Under orders from General Clinton, Cornwallis moved down the Virginia Peninsula towards the Chesapeake Bay where Clinton planned to extract part of the army for a siege of New York City. Cornwallis passed through Williamsburg and near Jamestown. When Cornwallis appeared to be moving to cross the James River, Lafayette saw a chance to attack Cornwallis during the crossing, and sent 800 troops under General Wayne against what they believed to be Cornwallis' rear guard. Cornwallis had set a trap, and Wayne was very nearly caught by the much larger, 5,000 soldier, main body of Cornwallis' forces at the Battle of Green Spring on July 6, 1781. Wayne ordered a charge against Cornwallis in order to feign greater strength and stop the British advance. Casualties were light with the Americans losing 140 and the British 75, but the ploy allowed the Americans to escape.

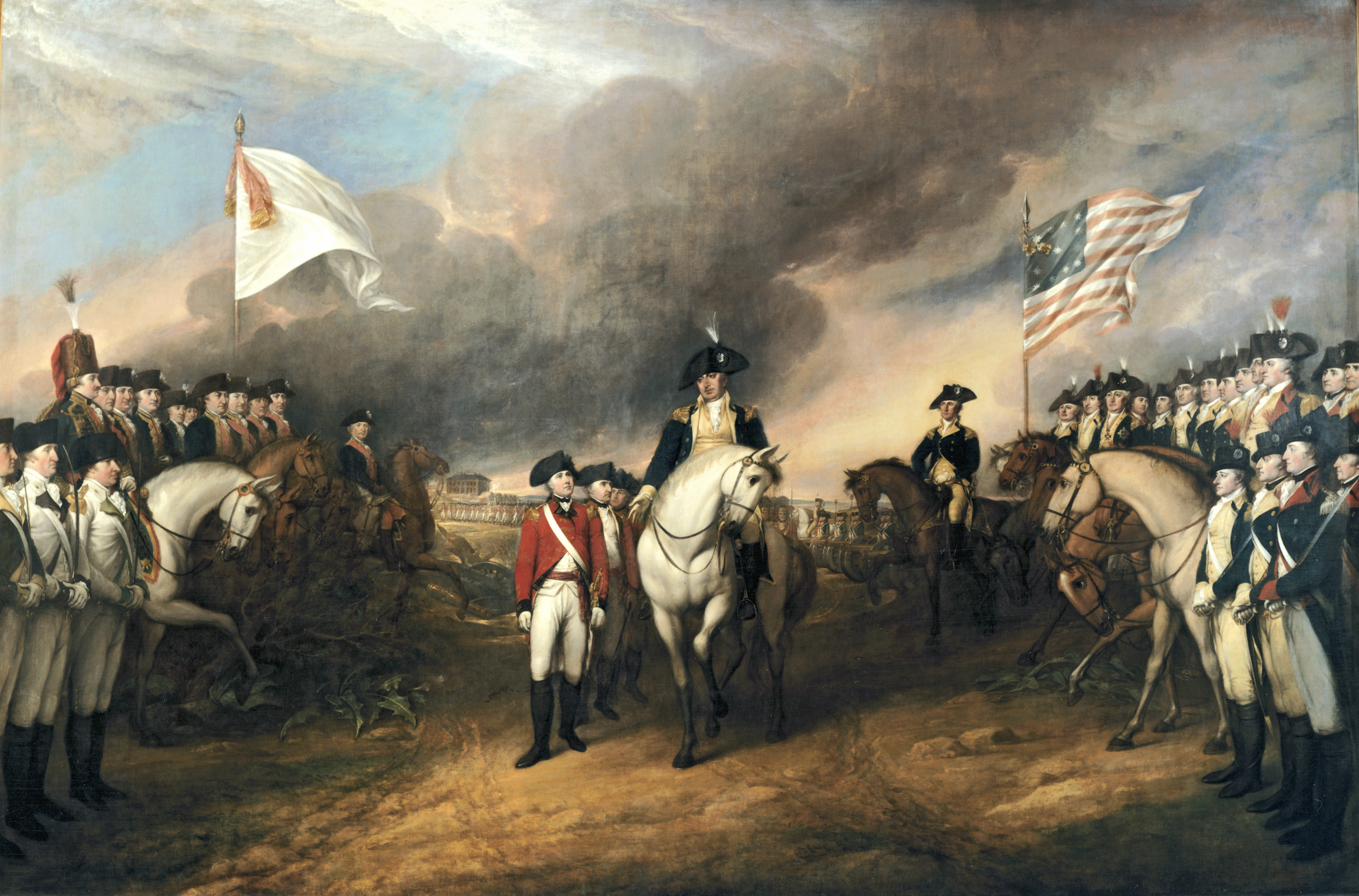
Surrender of Cornwallis at Yorktown (John Trumbull, 1797)

Cornwallis moved his troops across the James to Portsmouth to await Clinton's orders. Clinton decided that a position on the peninsula must be held and that Yorktown would be a valuable naval base. Cornwallis received orders to move his troops to Yorktown and begin construction of fortifications and a naval yard. The Americans had initially expected Cornwallis to move either to New York or the Carolinas and started to make arrangements to move from Virginia. Once they discovered the fortifications at Yorktown, the Americans began to place themselves around the city.

Gen. Washington saw the opportunity for a major victory. He moved a portion of his troops, along with Rochambeau's French troops, from New York to Virginia. The plan hinged on French reinforcements of 3,200 troops and a large naval force under the Admiral de Grasse. On September 5, Admiral de Grasse defeated a fleet of the Royal Navy at the Battle of the Virginia Capes. The defeat ensured French dominance of the waters around Yorktown, thereby preventing Cornwallis from receiving troops or supplies and removing the possibility of evacuation.

Between October 6 and 17 the American forces laid siege to Yorktown. Outgunned and completely surrounded, Cornwallis decided to surrender. Papers for surrender were officially signed on October 19. As a result of the defeat, the king lost control of Parliament and the new British government offered peace in April 1782. The Treaty of Paris of 1783 officially ended the war.

== See also ==
- Virginia Line
- Virginia State Navy
