= Edwards–Lincoln–Porter family =

The Edwards–Lincoln–Porter family is a family of politicians from the United States.

== Prominent members ==
- Benjamin Edwards (1753–1829), Maryland 1782–1784, Maryland State Court Judge 1793, U.S. Representative from Maryland 1795. Father of Ninian Edwards and Cyrus Edwards.
- Ninian Edwards (1775–1833), Kentucky State Representative 1796–1797, Kentucky State Court Judge 1803, Justice of the Kentucky Supreme Court 1808, Governor of Illinois Territory 1809–1813, U.S. Senator from Illinois 1818–1824, Governor of Illinois 1826–1830, candidate for U.S. Representative from Illinois 1832. Son of Benjamin Edwards.
- David Rittenhouse Porter (1788–1867), Pennsylvania State Representative 1819, Pennsylvania State Senator 1836, Governor of Pennsylvania 1839–1845. Granduncle by marriage of Abraham Lincoln.
- George Bryan Porter (1791–1834), Pennsylvania State Representative 1827, Governor of Michigan Territory 1831–1834. Brother of David Rittenhouse Porter and James Madison Porter.
- James Madison Porter (1793–1862), Pennsylvania State Court Judge 1839–1840 1850–1853, U.S. Secretary of War 1843–1844, member of the Pennsylvania Legislature 1849. Brother of David Rittenhouse Porter and George Bryan Porter.
- Cyrus Edwards (1793–1877), candidate for Governor of Illinois 1838, delegate to the Illinois Constitutional Convention 1847. Father of Matilda R. Edwards and Nelson G. Edwards. (Note: Matilda R. Edwards, daughter of Cyrus Edwards, was wooed by Abraham Lincoln while she stayed at the home of her cousin Ninian Wirt Edwards, brother-in-law of Mary Todd, who was also staying there in the winter of 1840–41. She subsequently married Newton Demming Strong, attorney and brother of the Honorable William Strong, who was elected to congress in 1847 and a chief justice of the Supreme Court, sworn in during 1870, thereby connecting the Strong family of politicians to the Edwards–Lincoln–Porter family of politicians. Matilda Edwards Strong and her husband are buried in Charles Evans Cemetery, Reading, PA.) Brother of Ninian Edwards.
- Daniel Pope Cook (1794–1827), Attorney General of Illinois 1819, U.S. Representative from Illinois 1819–1827. Son-in-law of Ninian Edwards.
- Ninian Wirt Edwards (1809–1889), Attorney General of Illinois 1834–1835, Illinois State Representative 1837–1841, 1849–1853, Illinois State Senator 1845–1849, delegate to the Illinois Constitutional Convention 1847, Illinois Superintendent of Public Instruction 1854–1857. Son of Ninian Edwards.
- Benjamin Edwards Grey (1809–1875), member of the Kentucky Legislature, U.S. Representative from Kentucky 1851–1855. Grandson of Benjamin Edwards.
- Horace Porter (1837–1921), U.S. Ambassador to France 1897–1905. Son of David Rittenhouse Porter. (Note: Horace Porter's niece, Emma, was married to American Samoa Governor John M. Poyer.)
- Abraham Lincoln (1809–1865), Illinois State Representative 1834–1841, U.S. Representative from Illinois 1847–1849, candidate for Republican nomination for Vice President of the United States 1856, candidate for U.S. Senate from Illinois 1858, President of the United States 1861–1865. His wife was sister-in-law of Ninian W. Edwards.
- James Harlan (1820–1899), Iowa Superintendent of Public Instruction 1847, U.S. Senator from Iowa 1855–1857 1857–1865 1867–1873, U.S. Secretary of the Interior 1865–1866, candidate for Republican nomination for President of the United States 1868. Father-in-law of Robert Todd Lincoln.
- Nathaniel H. R. Dawson (1829–1895), delegate to the Democratic National Convention 1860, Alabama State Representative 1880. Brother-in-law of Abraham Lincoln.
- Robert Todd Lincoln (1843–1926), member of the Chicago, Illinois Board of Supervisors 1876–1877; U.S. Secretary of War 1881–1885; U.S. Minister to Great Britain 1889–1893. Son of Abraham Lincoln.

== See also ==
- List of United States political families
