= Benjamin Edwards =

Benjamin or Ben Edwards may refer to:

- Benjamin Edwards (artist) (born 1970), American visual artist and writer
- Benjamin Edwards (Maryland politician) (1753–1829), American merchant and politician
- Benjamin Edwards (stockbroker) (1931–2009), American stockbroker
- Benjamin S. Edwards (1818–1886), American lawyer and judge
- Benjamin W. Edwards (c. 1780–1837), American colonist
- Ben Edwards (American football) (born 1992), American football wide receiver
- Ben Edwards (commentator) (born 1965), British motor racing commentator
- Ben Edwards (kickboxer) (born 1985), Australian boxer and mixed martial arts fighter
- Ben Edwards (music publisher) (c. 1884–1954), German-born American music publisher and talent agent
- Ben Charles Edwards (active since 2008), British film director, producer and writer
- Ben Edwards (rugby union) (1923–1978), Welsh international rugby union player
- Ben Edwards (Baywatch) (appearing 1991 to 1994), fictional character from the TV series, Baywatch
