= Edwards Hall (Elkton, Kentucky) =

- U.S. National Register of Historic Places
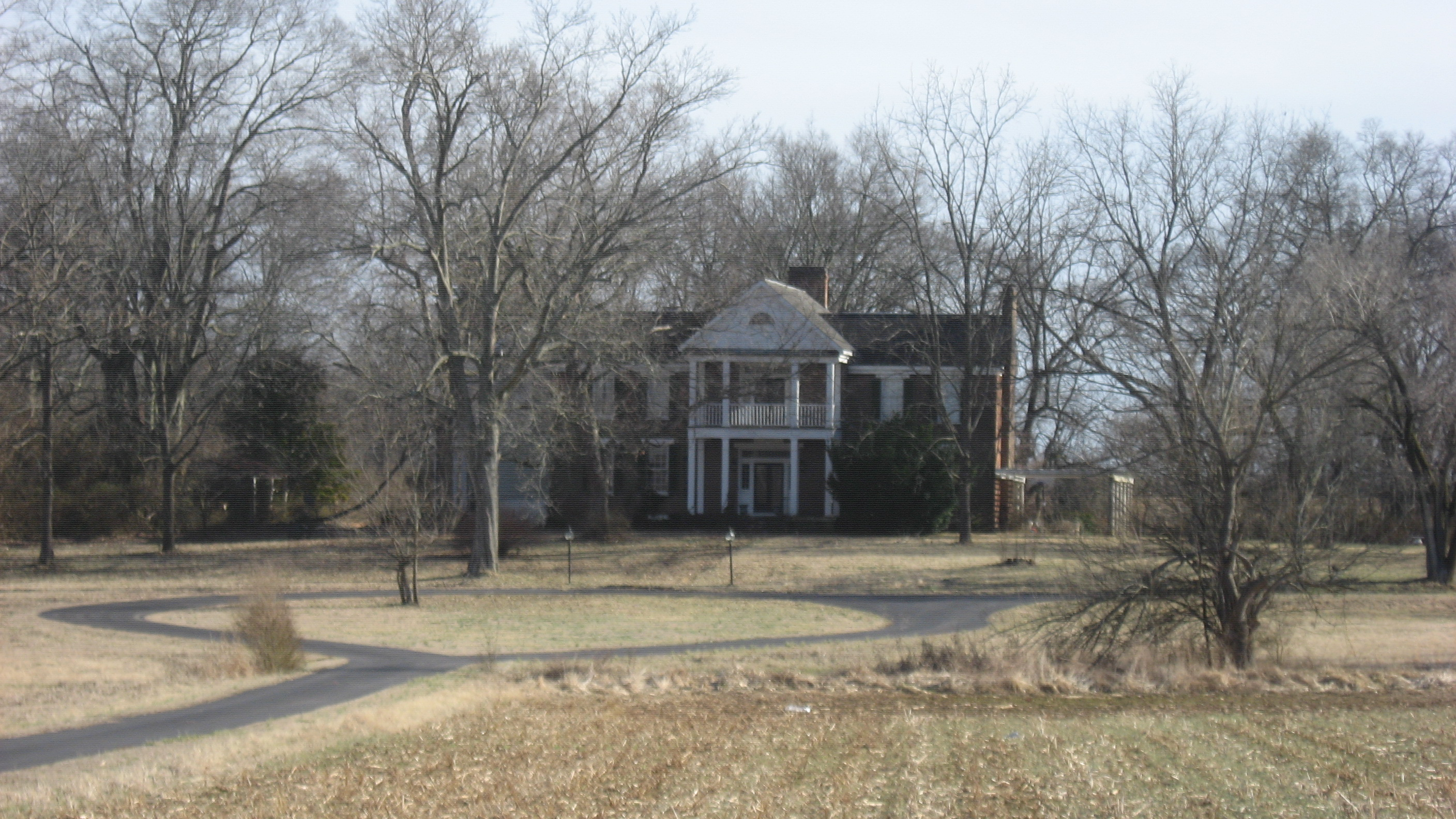
- Edwards Hall, March 2015

- Location within Kentucky
- Location: Goebel Avenue, Elkton, Kentucky
- Coordinates: 36°48′14″N 87°09′08″W
- Built: 1821
- Built by: Benjamin Edwards
- NRHP reference No.: 74000906
- Added to NRHP: January 11, 1974

Edwards Hall, located on a knoll overlooking Goebel Ave in Elkton, Kentucky, was built around 1821 by Benjamin Edwards. It was listed on the National Register of Historic Places in 1974.

== History ==
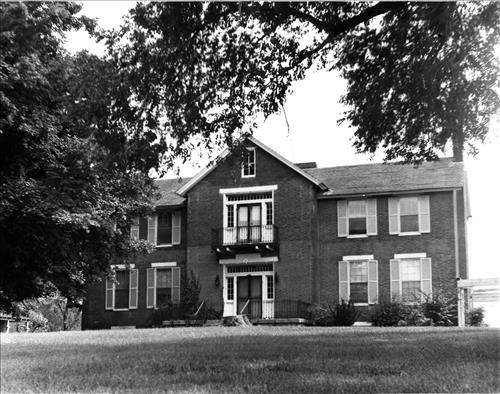
Edwards Hall, January 1972.

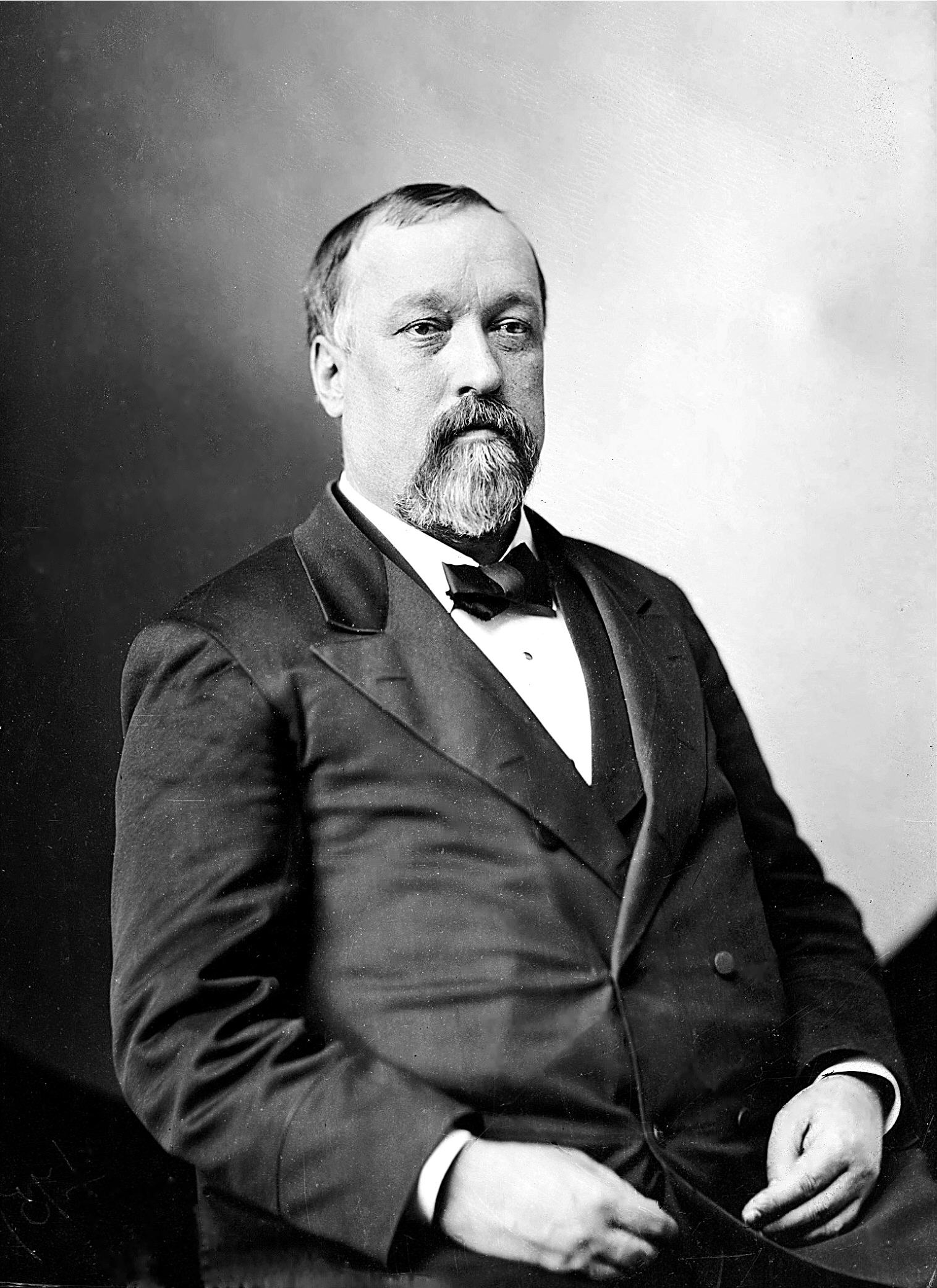
Secretary Benjamin Bristow, who was born at the home in 1832

Edwards Hall is a large and stately two-story brick residence that was built in 1821 by former U.S. Representative from Maryland Benjamin Edwards. He was a member of a prominent family, including his brother, John Edwards, who represented Kentucky in the Virginia House of Delegates before Kentucky became a state and helped Kentucky attain statehood, was elected to both houses of the State Legislature, and was one of the first two U.S. Senators to represent Kentucky. Benjamin's eldest son, Ninian Beall Edward, was the Chief Justice of the Kentucky Court of Appeals before serving as Governor and U.S. Senator for Illinois.

Ninian Wirt Edwards, Benjamin's grandson and Ninian's son, was the first superintendent of public instruction in Illinois and was elected to the Illinois State Legislature several times. He married Elizabeth Todd, the sister of Mary Todd, who met, courted and married Abraham Lincoln in the younger Edwards' home.

Benjamin Helm Bristow, a great-grandson of Benjamin Edwards' (through his daughter Mary (née Edwards) Helm and granddaughter Emily (née Helm) Bristow), was born at Edwards Hall. A son of U.S. Representative from Kentucky and businessman Francis Bristow, Benjamin Helm Bristow served as the first Solicitor General and the Secretary of the Treasury under President Ulysses S. Grant.

=== Architectural details ===
The front façade is three bays in width and each of the two end bays has four shuttered windows. The central bay is gabled and has two identical double doors, one above the other, with a narrow window above the second story door. Each of the double doors has glass sidelights and a glass transom. The first floor doorway is flanked by period lighting and opens into a low porch that has a wrought iron railing; while the second floor doorway opens onto a balcony with identical wrought iron trim.

=== National Register of Historic Places ===
The building was meticulously restored approximately around 1940 and upon its nomination to the National Register of Historic Places, it was in excellent condition.

== See also ==
- National Register of Historic Places listings in Todd County, Kentucky
