= Edwards Place =

Historic house in Illinois, United States

- U.S. National Register of Historic Places
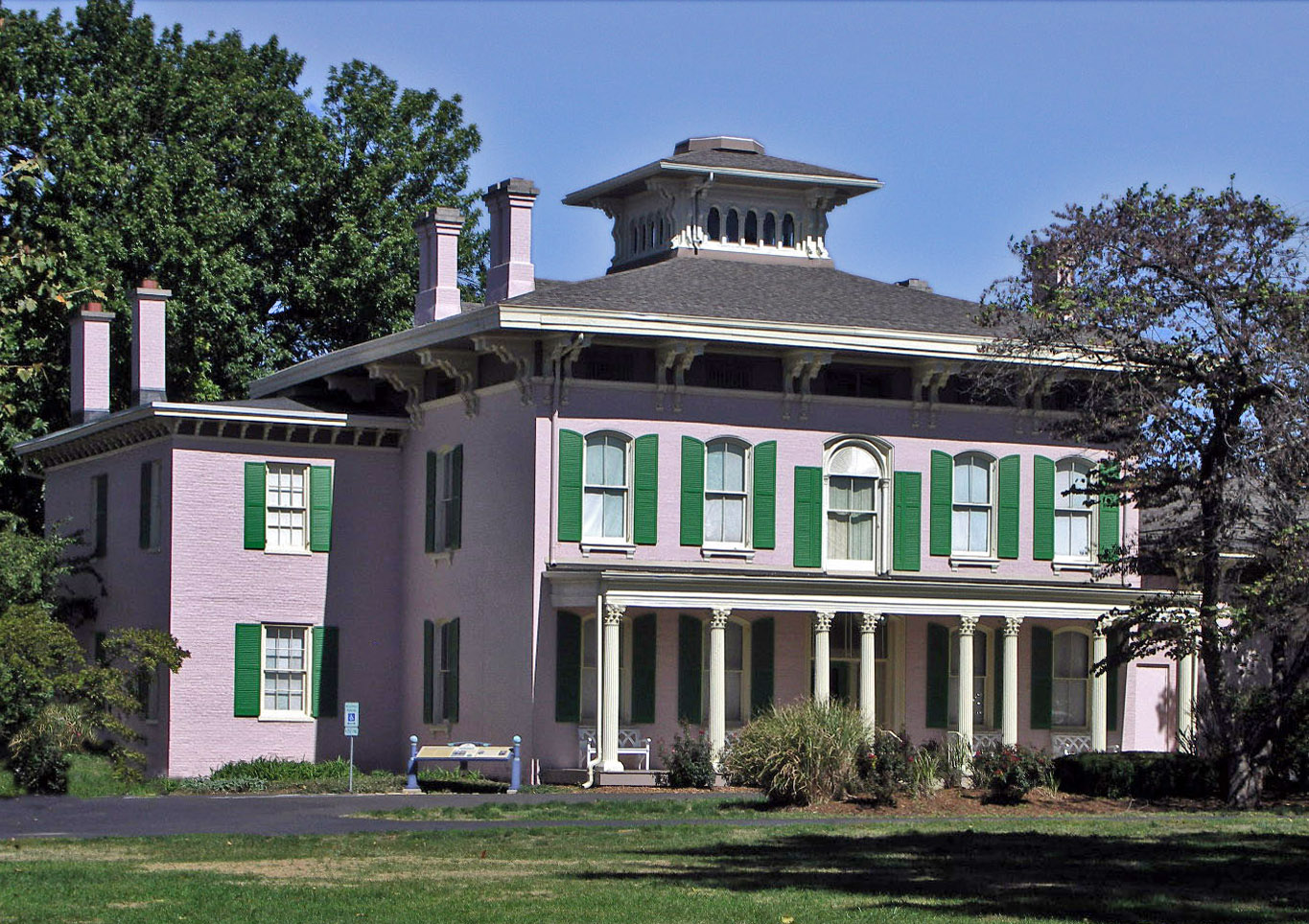

- Location within Illinois Location within the United States
- Location: 700 N. 4th St., Springfield, Illinois
- Coordinates: 39°48′34″N 89°39′1″W
- Area: 0 acres (0 ha)
- Built: 1833
- Architectural style: Italianate
- NRHP reference No.: 69000058
- Added to NRHP: December 17, 1969

Edwards Place is a historic house located at 700 North 4th Street in Springfield, Illinois. The house was begun in 1833 in the Greek Revival style, making it one of the oldest houses in Springfield. (The Elijah Iles House, also in Springfield, was built in 1832.) Additions in 1836 and 1843, and a major rebuild/expansion in 1857, created the Italianate house preserved today. The house's Italianate features include bracketed cornices and a cupola with a skylight.

Lawyer Benjamin S. Edwards, son of Illinois governor Ninian Edwards, owned the house. While he lived there, the house became an important political center for Springfield, as Edwards hosted rallies and gatherings for Illinois politicians. Stephen A. Douglas hosted a rally on the property. The house also hosted guests who came to Springfield for Lincoln's funeral. Several of the Lincoln family's possessions are now held in the Edwards house.

Edwards' daughter, Alice Edwards Ferguson, donated the house to the Springfield Art Association for its founding in 1913; it has since served the association as a museum, school, and meeting house.

The house was added to the National Register of Historic Places on December 17, 1969.
