= Illinois Intelligencer =

- Type: Weekly newspaper
- Owner: Daniel Pope Cook
- Founder: Matthew Duncan
- Publisher: Blackwell & Berry
- Founded: 1814
- Headquarters: Kaskaskia, Illinois (1814–1820); Vandalia, Illinois (1820–1832)

The Illinois Intelligencer (1814–1832), was the first newspaper in Illinois. Founded by Kentucky native Matthew Duncan as the Illinois Herald in 1814, the printing offices were also used to print early territorial documents. In 1816, the operation was sold to Daniel Pope Cook, who re-titled the publication the Western Intelligencer. Under Robert Blackwell, Elijah C. Berry, and William C. Berry, the paper was issued until 1832.

== History ==
The formation of the Illinois Territory in 1809 led to the first state printing five years later. The first state printer was Matthew Duncan of Russellville, Kentucky, the older brother of future Illinois governor Joseph Duncan. The elder Duncan was a graduate of Yale College and returned to Russellville in 1808 to found the Farmer's Friend newspaper. The paper was certainly published through 1810 and probably continued through 1813.

Duncan was a friend of Ninian Edwards, the first territorial governor of Illinois. Through this connection, he was commissioned to print the Laws Passed by the Legislative Council & House of Representatives, of the Illinois Territory, at their First Session Held at Kaskaskia, in 1812, the first official document from the territory. Seeing a future as the state printer, Duncan moved to Kaskaskia in 1814.

In the spring of 1814, Duncan founded the Illinois Herald in Kaskaskia, the first newspaper issued and the first work of print in the Illinois Territory. Duncan apparently closed the printing office during the winter of 1815 to 1816 to enter the United States Army. He sold his printing press to Daniel Pope Cook, who established the Western Intelligencer in Kaskaskia in April 1816. He soon admitted Robert Blackwell as a partner and assumed publishing duties. Elijah Conway Berry, a former state printer of Kentucky, was hired as co-publisher in 1817.

Blackwell and Berry changed the named of the paper to the Illinois Intelligencer in May 1818. They also printed the first Constitution of Illinois in August 1818. Blackwell & Berry continued to publish the newspaper in Kaskaskia until the fall of 1820, when operations were moved to the new state capital, Vandalia. The Intelligencer thus became the first publication in that town. Elijah C. Berry was then replaced by his brother, William C. Berry. Publication of the Intelligencer continued until the Black Hawk War of 1832. The press was later used for the Vandalia Whig paper.
