= Cyrus Edwards =

American politician and lawyer (1793–1877)

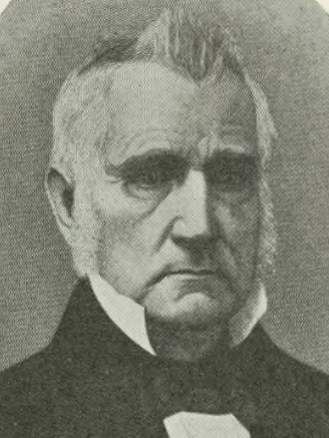

Member of the Illinois House of Representatives
- In office 1832–1834, 1838–1840

Member of the Illinois Senate
- In office 1834–1838
- Preceded by: Joseph Conway

Member of the Illinois General Assembly
- In office 1860–1862

Personal details
- Born: June 17, 1793 Montgomery County, Maryland, US
- Died: August 31, 1877 (aged 84) Upper Alton, Illinois, US
- Party: Whig
- Other political affiliations: Republican
- Relations: Ninian Edwards (brother); Ninian Wirt Edwards (nephew); Daniel Pope Cook (nephew-in-law); Finis McLean (nephew-in-law); Richard Lee Metcalfe (grandson); Theodore W. Metcalfe (great-grandson); John Pope Cook (great uncle); Elias Loomis (brother-in-law)
- Children: 12
- Parent: Benjamin Edwards (father)
- Occupation: Politician, lawyer

Cyrus Edwards (June 17, 1793 – August 31, 1877) was an American politician and lawyer. A Whig, he served in the Illinois House of Representatives and the Illinois Senate. He was the son of politician Benjamin Edwards and the brother of Ninian Edwards.

== Early life ==
Edwards was born on June 17, 1793, in Montgomery County, Maryland, the ninth of fourteen children born to Benjamin Edwards and Margaret (née Beall) Edwards. His older brother was politician Ninian Edwards. In 1800, he and his family moved to Kentucky. He was educated at a private school. Beginning at age 19, he read law with his brother, Presly Edwards, and in 1815, was admitted to the bar in Kaskaskia, Illinois.

== Career ==
For some time, Edwards practiced law in Potosi, Missouri, but in 1819, moved to Elkton, Kentucky. In 1829, he moved to Edwardsville, Illinois, where he continued practicing law. He served in the Black Hawk War and managed equipment. He was also a quartermaster general, serving under Governor John Reynolds. He owned slaves, and in 1841, a slave of his named Wilke was sentenced to five years in prison for poisoning Edwards' family; Wilke was defended by lawyer John M. Krum.

Edwards was a Whig. He served in Illinois House of Representatives from 1832 to 1834, and again from 1838 to 1840. He served in the Illinois Senate from 1834 to 1838. In 1837, he ran for Governor of Illinois, losing to Thomas Carlin by 996 votes, with the voted being fraudulent, coming from foreign immigrants working on the Illinois and Michigan Canal. On two occasions he ran as a minority candidate for the United States Senate. In 1847, he was a delegate to the Illinois State Constitutional Convention from Madison County, during which he suggested a change which went on to pay off the $2,000,000 state debt. He again ran for the Illinois General Assembly as a Republican and served from 1860 to 1862. He also helped Lyman Trumbull get elected to the Senate.

== Personal life and death ==
In 1818, Edwards married Nancy Harriet Reed, who was then sixteen; they had eight children together. In 1837, he married Sophia Loomis, the sister of mathematician Elias Loomis; they had four children together. He was 6 ft 2 in (1.88 m) tall and described as friendly.

After retiring from politics, Edwards was a philanthropist and an advocate for public schools. He donated $10,000 of land for Shurtleff College, and was the chairman of its board of trustees for 35 years. In 1852, the college have him an honorary Doctor of Laws. He owned a farm in Alton worth $25,000. Around 1874, he became a Baptist. He died on August 31, 1877, aged 84, in Alton. He was buried at Oakwood Cemetery, in Alton.

Edwards was the uncle of politician Ninian Wirt Edwards, as well as Julia Catherine Edwards and Lucy Amanda Gray, the wives of politicians Daniel Pope Cook and Finis McLean, respectively. He was also the grandfather of politician Richard Lee Metcalfe and the great-grandfather of politician Theodore W. Metcalfe, as well as the great uncle of politician John Pope Cook.

Party political offices
Preceded by Joseph Duncan	Whig nominee for Governor of Illinois; 1838	Succeeded by Joseph Duncan
