= Attorney General Edwards =

Attorney General Edwards may refer to:

- Ninian Wirt Edwards (1809–1889), Attorney General of Illinois
- W. Cary Edwards (1944–2010), Attorney General of New Jersey

== See also ==
- Cheryl Edwardes (born 1950), Attorney-General of Western Australia
