= H. H. Maxwell =

American politician

Hugh H. Maxwell

Auditor of Public Accounts of Illinois Territory
- In office 1812-1816
- Preceded by: none
- Succeeded by: Daniel Pope Cook

Hugh H. Maxwell was Auditor of Public Accounts of the Illinois Territory from 1812 to 1816. He was elected by the Governor of the Illinois Territory, Ninian Edwards. According to the Illinois Comptroller's Office Official Website there is no further existing information regarding Maxwell except his name and his tenure.
