= Elizabeth Todd Edwards =

American socialite (1813–1888)

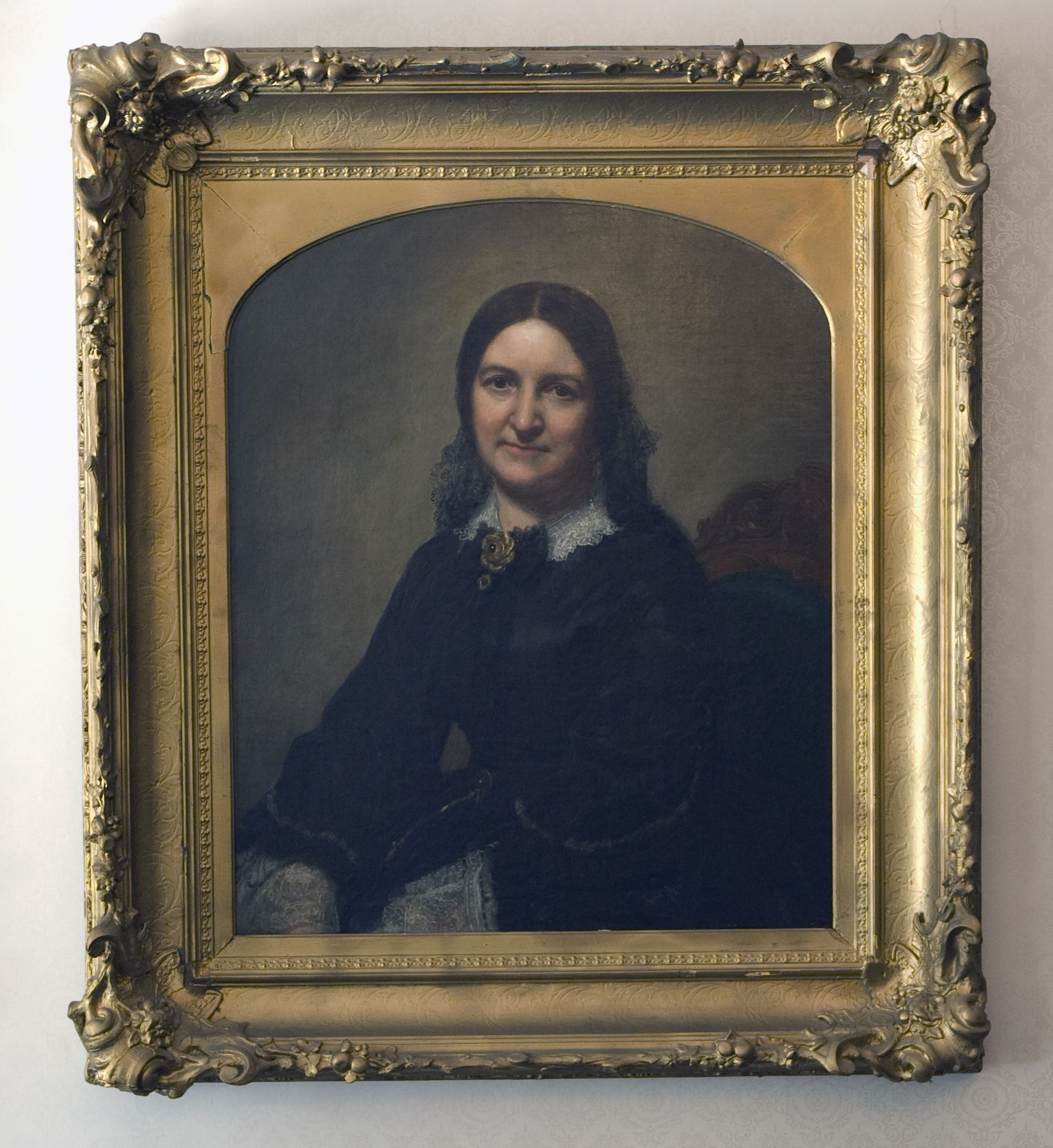
- Born: Elizabeth Porter Todd; November 13, 1813; Lexington, Kentucky, U.S.
- Died: February 22, 1888 (aged 74)
- Resting place: Oak Ridge Cemetery
- Occupation: socialite
- Spouse: Ninian Wirt Edwards
- Parent(s): Robert Smith Todd (father); Elizabeth Parker
- Relatives: Mary Todd Lincoln (sister); Abraham Lincoln (brother-in-law)

Elizabeth Porter Todd Edwards (November 13, 1813 – February 22, 1888) was an American socialite and the sister of First Lady Mary Todd Lincoln. She served as Mary's guardian for many years. Mary met her husband, Abraham Lincoln, in 1839 at Edwards' home, where they later married. In 1875, Edwards helped Mary get released from an insane asylum.

== Biography ==
Elizabeth Edwards was born in Lexington, Kentucky in 1813 to Robert Smith Todd and Elizabeth Parker Todd. She married Ninian Wirt Edwards, the son of a former Illinois governor, in 1832. The Edwards lived in a well-to-do house on Aristocracy Hill in Springfield, Illinois. They would host many gatherings of the Springfield gentry, and Elizabeth invited her three sisters, including Mary, to live with her. Mary met Abraham Lincoln in one of the Edwards social gatherings and they married there on November 4, 1842. Edwards stayed in the White House with her sister for the presidential inauguration. She returned in 1862 to console Mary after the death of her son, Willie Lincoln.

Edwards' sister Mary is believed to have suffered severe depression during her time as First Lady of the United States and after Lincoln's assassination. Her son, Robert Todd Lincoln, committed her to an insane asylum in 1875, over Elizabeth's objections. Mary was released from asylum into Elizabeth's care after a trial. Mary died at Elizabeth's home in 1882. Elizabeth died in 1888 and is buried in Oak Ridge Cemetery in Springfield.
