= Benjamin Edwards (Maryland politician) =

American merchant and politician (1753–1829)

Member of the U.S. House of Representatives from Maryland's 3rd district
- In office January 2, 1795 – March 3, 1795
- Preceded by: Uriah Forrest
- Succeeded by: Jeremiah Crabb

Personal details
- Born: August 12, 1753 Stafford County, Virginia
- Died: November 13, 1829 (aged 76) Elkton, Kentucky
- Party: Pro-Administration
- Spouse: Margaret Beall
- Relations: See Edwards family
- Children: 13, including Ninian, Cyrus

Benjamin Edwards (August 12, 1753 – November 13, 1829) was an American merchant and political leader from Montgomery County, Maryland. He represented the third district of Maryland for a very short time in the United States House of Representatives in 1795 after Uriah Forrest resigned.

== Early life ==
Edwards was born on August 12, 1753, in Stafford County, Virginia; the son of Haden Edwards and Penelope (née Sanford) Edwards. He attended the common schools.

== Career ==
Edwards was a prominent farmer and merchant in Montgomery County, Maryland. For about twenty-five years, he lived at Mount Pleasant farm, which was nine miles from the Montgomery County court house. He served as a member of the Maryland House of Delegates for several years. He was a delegate to the Maryland State Convention of 1788, to vote whether Maryland should ratify the proposed Constitution of the United States. He was a mentor to William Wirt, who later became the longest serving Attorney General of the United States.

In 1795, after the resignation of Representative Uriah Forrest, Edwards was elected as a Pro-Administration candidate to represent the 3rd district of Maryland in the United States House of Representatives. He served just two months before he was succeeded by Jeremiah Crabb.

=== Later life ===
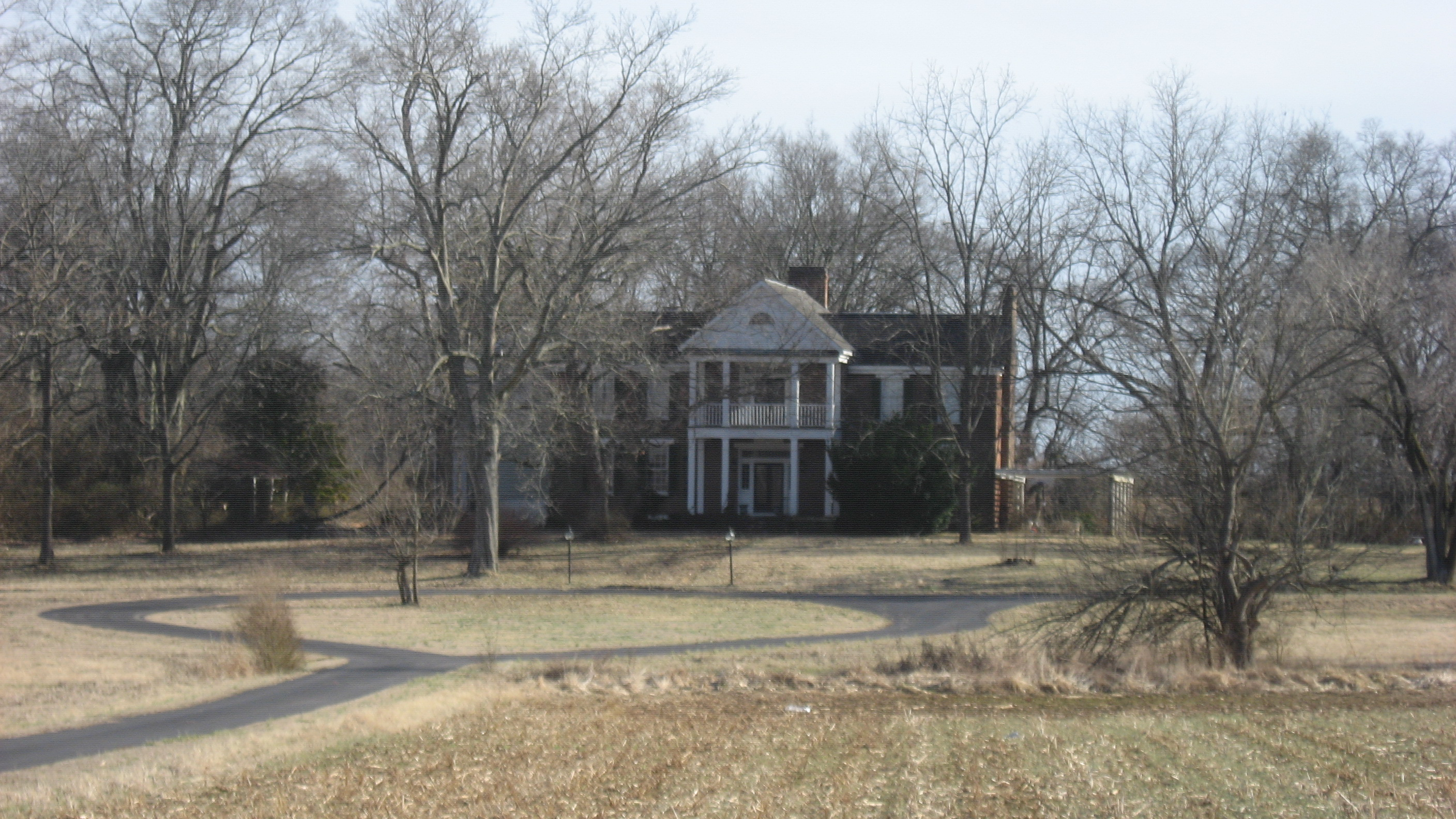
Edwards' home in Elkton

Late in life, Edwards migrated westward to the new settlement of Elkton in Todd County, Kentucky. Here, he built a new house, named Edwards Hall, in 1821. The house remained in Edwards' family after his death; here his daughter Emily bore Edwards' grandson Benjamin Helm Bristow. Still standing, it was listed on the National Register of Historic Places in 1974.

== Personal life ==
Edwards was married to Margaret Beall (1754–1826), who was known as the "Beauty of Montgomery." She was a daughter of Col. Ninian Beall, an immigrant from Scotland who started his life in America as an indentured servant and ended up as a major landowner and merchant who owned Woodley Mansion. Together, they were the parents of thirteen children, including:

- Ninian Edwards (1775–1833), who later served as Governor and U.S. Senator for Illinois; he married Elvira Lane, in 1803.
- Mary Edwards (1777–1871), who married Henry Whitaker, brother of William White Whitaker. After his death, she married Maj. Benjamin Helm of Elizabethtown, Kentucky; she was the mother of Emily (née Helm) Bristow and grandmother of Benjamin Bristow, Secretary of the Treasury under President Ulysses S. Grant.
- Penelope Edwards (1779–1845), who married William White Whitaker.
- Elisha Beall Edwards (1781–1823), who married Lucy Richardson in 1811. After her death, he married Martha Feliciana Upshow.
- Presley Edwards (1784–1833), who married Hester Pope in 1810.
- Elizabeth Edwards (1786–1833), who married John Grey; parents of U.S. Representative from Kentucky Benjamin Edwards Grey.
- Margaret Edwards (1788–1851), who died unmarried.
- Matilda Edwards (1790–1878), who married Rev. Franceway Ranna Cossitt, the founder of Cumberland College, in 1834.
- Lucretia Maria Edwards (1792–1863), who married Gen. Duff Green, a teacher, military leader, journalist, author, and industrialist who served as U.S. Minister to Mexico.
- Cyrus Edwards (1793–1877), a member of the Whig Party who served in the Illinois House of Representatives and in the Illinois Senate who married Nancy Harriet Reed (1802–1834) in 1818. After her death, he married teacher Sophia Loomis (1809–1897), in 1837.
- Benjamin Franklin Edwards (1797–1877), who married Elizabeth Green (1797–1876) in 1819.
- Rachel Edwards (1800–1828), who married Rev. William C. Warfield.
- Washington Edwards, who died young.

Edwards died on November 13, 1829, in Elkton, Kentucky.

=== Descendants ===
Through his son Ninian, he was a grandfather of Ninian, Albert, Benjamin, Julia Edwards.

U.S. House of Representatives
Preceded by Uriah Forrest	U.S. Congressman for Maryland's 3rd District; 1795	Succeeded by Jeremiah Crabb
