= Benjamin Bristow =

American lawyer and politician (1832–1896)

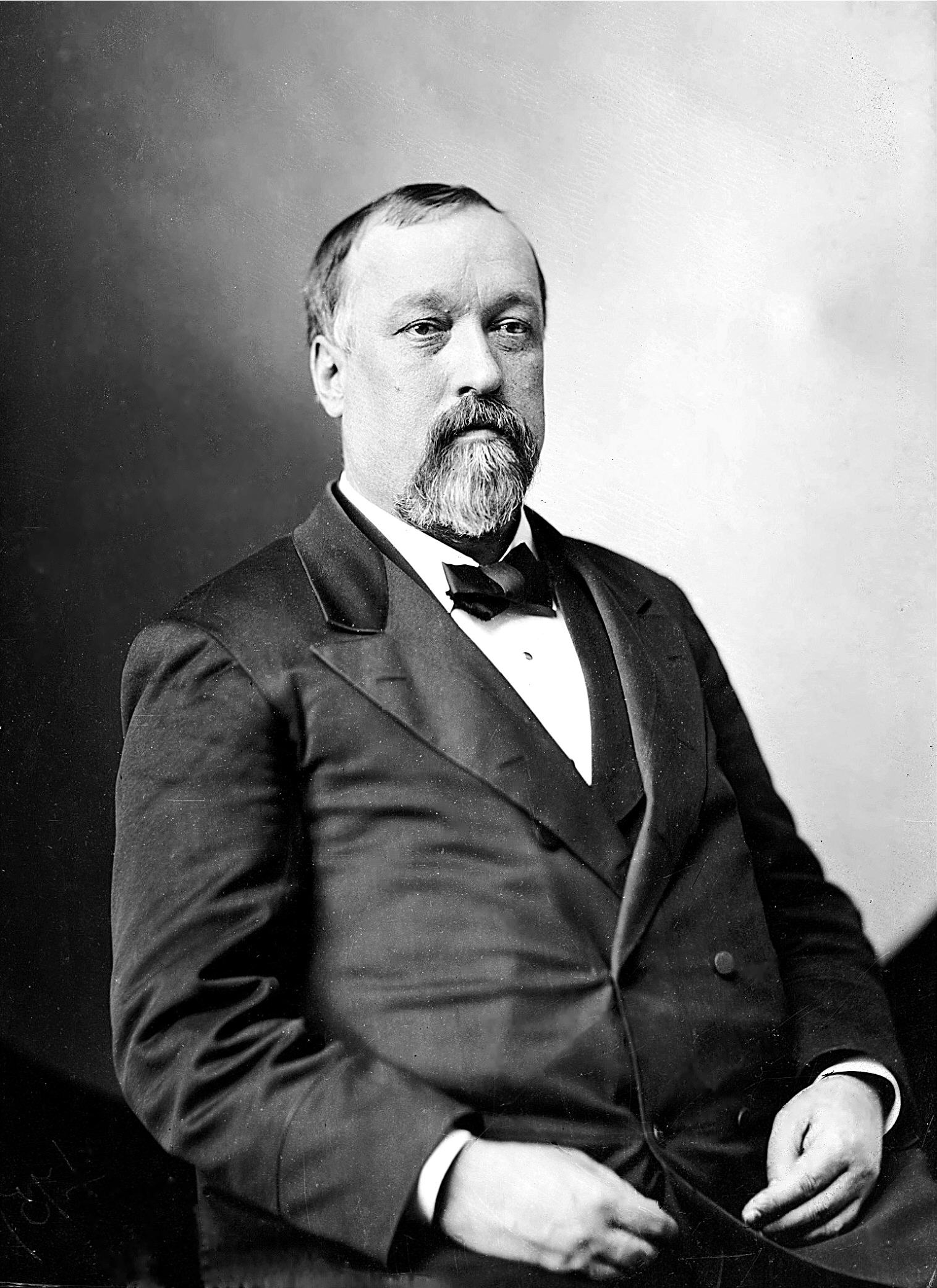
- Bristow, 1870–1880

30th United States Secretary of the Treasury
- In office June 4, 1874 – June 20, 1876
- President: Ulysses S. Grant
- Preceded by: William Richardson
- Succeeded by: Lot M. Morrill

1st Solicitor General of the United States
- In office October 1, 1870 – November 12, 1872
- President: Ulysses S. Grant
- Preceded by: Position established
- Succeeded by: Samuel F. Phillips

Member of the Kentucky Senate from the 6th district
- In office 1863–1865

Personal details
- Born: Benjamin Helm Bristow; June 20, 1832 Elkton, Kentucky, U.S.
- Died: June 22, 1896 (aged 64) New York City, U.S.
- Party: Whig (Before 1860); Republican (1860–1896)
- Education: Washington and Jefferson College (BA)

Military service
- Allegiance: United States
- Branch/service: United States Army
- Years of service: 1861–1863
- Rank: Colonel
- Battles/wars: American Civil War • Battle of Shiloh

Benjamin Helm Bristow (June 20, 1832 – June 22, 1896) was an American lawyer and politician who served as the 30th U.S. Treasury Secretary and the first Solicitor General.

A Union military officer, Bristow was a Republican Party reformer and civil rights advocate. During his tenure as Secretary of the Treasury, he is primarily known for breaking up and prosecuting the Whiskey Ring at the behest of President Grant, a corrupt tax evasion profiteering ring that depleted the national treasury. Additionally, Bristow promoted gold standard currency rather than paper money. Bristow was one of Grant's most popular Cabinet members among reformers. Bristow supported Grant's Resumption of Specie Act of 1875, that helped stabilize the economy during the Panic of 1873. As the United States' first solicitor general, Bristow aided President Ulysses S. Grant and Attorney General Amos T. Akerman's vigorous and thorough prosecution and destruction of the Ku Klux Klan in the Reconstructed South. Solicitor General Bristow advocated for African American citizens in Kentucky to be allowed to testify in a white man's court case. He also advocated education for all races to be paid for by public funding.

A native of Kentucky, Bristow was the son of a prominent Whig Unionist and attorney. Having graduated from Jefferson College in Pennsylvania in 1851, Bristow studied law and passed the bar in 1853, working as an attorney until the outbreak of the American Civil War in 1861. Fighting for the Union, Bristow served in the army during the American Civil War and was promoted to colonel. Wounded at the Battle of Shiloh, Bristow recuperated and was promoted to lieutenant colonel. In 1863, Bristow was elected Kentucky state Senator, serving only one term. At the end of the Civil War, Bristow was appointed assistant to the U.S. District Attorney serving in the Louisville area. In 1866, Bristow was appointed U.S. District attorney, serving in the Louisville area.

In 1870, Bristow was appointed the United States' first U.S. Solicitor General, who aided the U.S. Attorney General by arguing cases before the U.S. Supreme Court. In 1874, Bristow was appointed U.S. Secretary of the Treasury by President Ulysses S. Grant. Initially Grant gave Bristow his full support during Bristow's popular prosecution of the Whiskey Ring. However, when Bristow and Grant's Attorney General Edwards Pierrepont, another reforming Cabinet member, uncovered that Orville Babcock, Grant's personal secretary, was involved in the ring, Grant's relationship with Bristow cooled. In June 1876, due to friction over Bristow's zealous prosecution of the Whiskey Ring and rumor that Bristow was interested in running for the U.S. presidency, Bristow resigned from President Grant's Cabinet on his 44th birthday. During the 1876 United States presidential election, Bristow made an unsuccessful attempt at gaining the Republican presidential ticket, running as a Republican reformer. The Republicans, however, chose Rutherford B. Hayes. After the 1876 presidential election, Bristow returned to private practice in New York. He formed a successful law practice in 1878, often arguing cases before the U.S. Supreme Court until his death in 1896.

Bristow was credited, by historian Jean Edward Smith, as one of Grant's best cabinet choices. Reformers were generally pleased by Secretary Bristow's overall prosecution of the Whiskey Ring, and looked to him for cleaning up government corruption. Historians have also given credit for Bristow, America's first Solicitor General, for prosecuting the Ku Klux Klan. Bristow, however, had an ambitious, contentious nature, and at times this led to various feuds with Grant cabinet members. Bristow, a native of Kentucky, represented the Southern United States on Grant's cabinet, during Grant's second term.

== Early life ==
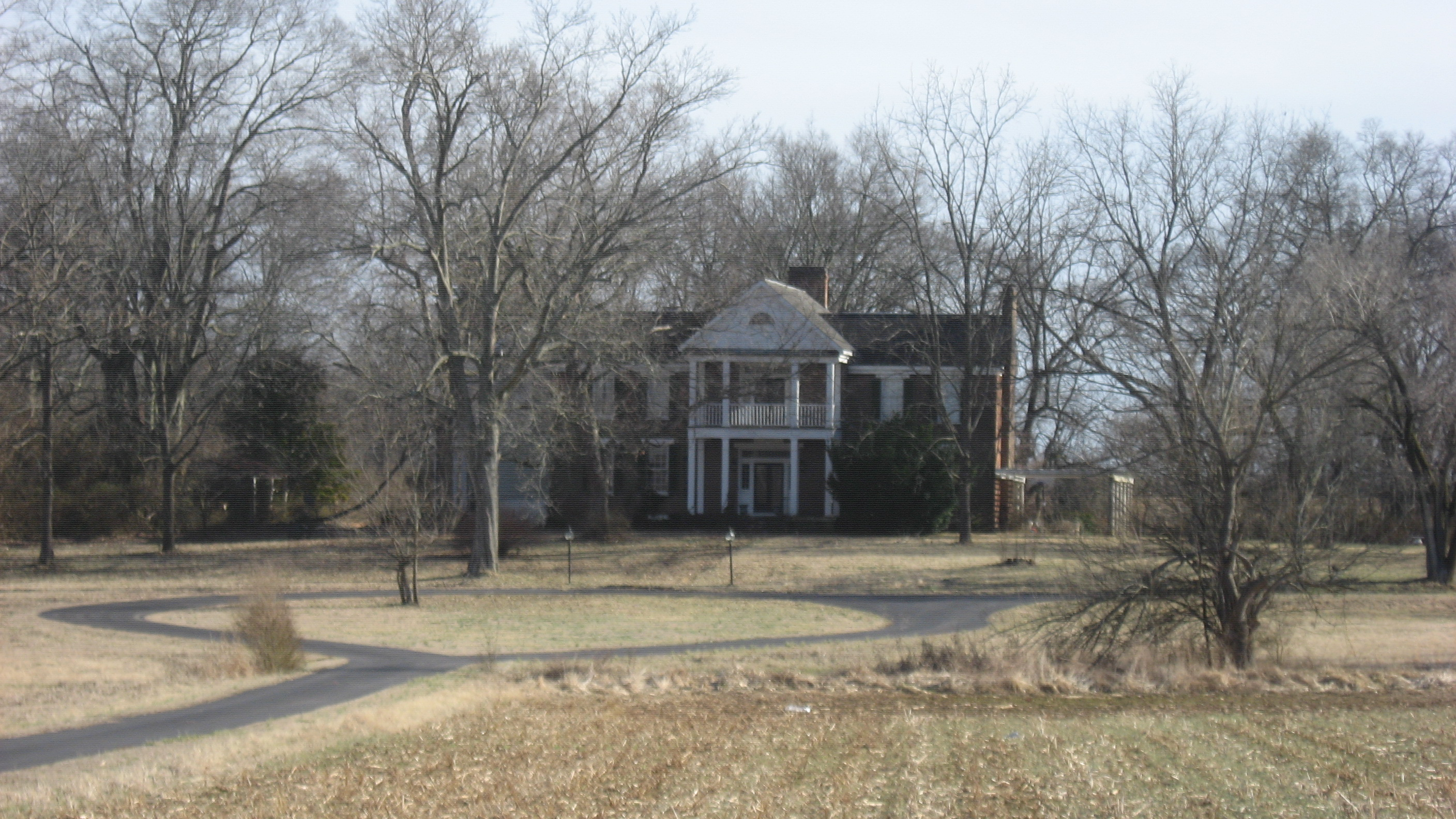
Bristow's birthplace, Edwards Hall

Benjamin Helm Bristow was born in Edwards Hall on June 20, 1832, in Elkton, Kentucky, United States. Bristow was the son of Francis M. Bristow and his wife Emily Helm. Francis was a prominent lawyer and Whig member of Congress in 1854–1855 and 1859–1861. Edwards Hall was the home of his late grandfather, Benjamin Edwards. Bristow graduated at Jefferson College, Washington, Pennsylvania, in 1851, studied law under his father, and was admitted to the Kentucky bar in 1853. For a while Bristow worked as a law partner for his father. His father later became a strong anti-slavery Unionist. His father's political anti-slavery and Whig views strongly influenced Bristow's own political outlook.

== Marriage and family ==
On November 21, 1854, aged 22, Bristow married Abbie S. Briscoe. Benjamin and Abbie had two children one son, William A. Bristow, and one daughter Nannie Bristow. William was an attorney who worked in Bristow's New York law firm Bristow, Opdyke, & Willcox. In June 1896 William was in London recovering from typhoid fever. Nannie married Eben S. Sumner a Massachusetts textile businessman and politician.

== Kentucky law practice (1858–1861) ==
In 1858, Bristow and his wife Abbie moved to Hopkinsville, Kentucky. Bristow practiced law until the outbreak of the Civil War.

== American Civil War (1861–1863) ==
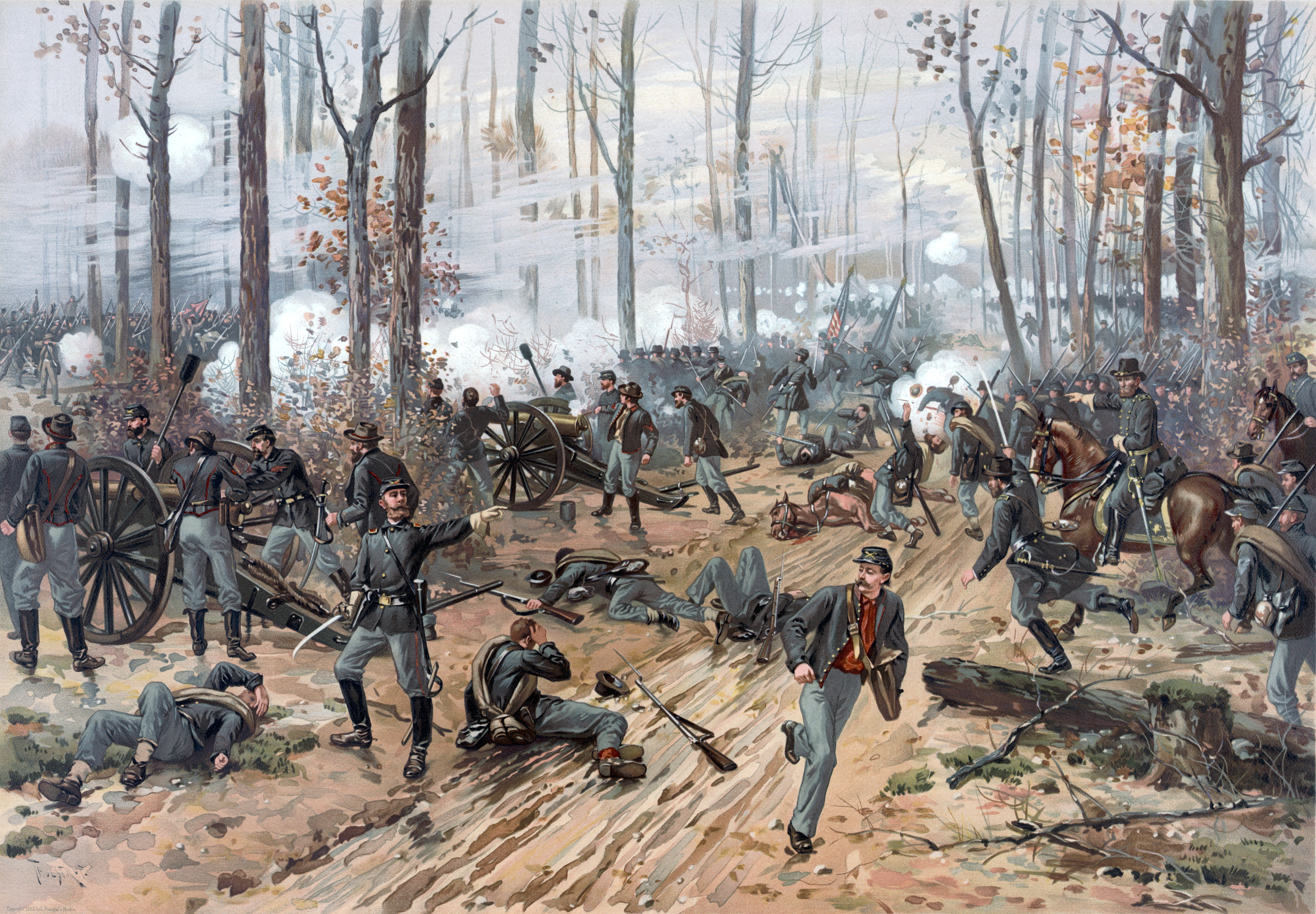
The Battle of Shiloh

In December 1860, after Abraham Lincoln was elected, the South seceded from the Union and formed the Confederacy (1861), primarily to protect the institution of slavery, profitable cotton plantations, and resistance to black integration and citizenship. President James Buchanan, sympathetic to the South, did virtually nothing to contain Southern secession, prior to Lincoln's March 4, 1861, Inauguration. At the beginning of the Civil War in 1861, Bristow, an ardent Unionist, joined the Union Army, and mustered the 25th Kentucky Infantry . On September 21, 1861, Bristow was appointed lieutenant colonel of the 25th Kentucky Infantry. Bristow fought under General Ulysses S. Grant and served bravely at three battles, Fort Henry, Fort Donelson, and Shiloh, at the latter he was injured.

In April 1862, General Grant and most of his Union Army were encamped at Pittsburg Landing, and had planned to attack Corinth, a Confederate stronghold. The Confederates, however attacked in full force, that surprised Grant's unentrenched Union Army. Grant and his men were able to hold off the Confederate Army, although one Union division was captured. The next day, after Grant received reinforcements, the Union Army attacked the Confederates in full force and pushed the Southern Army back to Corinth. At this two day Battle of Shiloh in Tennessee, Bristow was severely wounded by an exploding shell over his head and temporarily forced to retire from field duty in order to recover from his injury. The force and noise of the explosion left Bristow deaf and unconscious, unable to command. Bristow was replaced by Major William B. Wall. After his recuperation, Bristow returned to field service during the summer of 1862 and helped recruit the 8th Kentucky Cavalry.

On September 8, 1862, Bristow was commissioned lieutenant colonel over the 8th Kentucky Cavalry. Bristow assumed command of the 8th Kentucky Cavalry in January 1863 after Col. James M. Shackleford, the previous commander, was promoted brigadier general. On April 1, 1863, Bristow was promoted to colonel and continued his command over the 8th Kentucky Cavalry. In July 1863 Col. Bristow and the Kentucky 8th Cavalry assisted in the capture of John Hunt Morgan during his July 1863 raid through Indiana and Ohio.

== Kentucky state senator (1863–1865) ==
Bristow was honorably discharged from service in the Union Army on September 23, 1863, having been elected to the sixth district of the Kentucky Senate, which comprised Christian and Todd Counties. Bristow had not known he had been elected to the senate; he later resigned from the body in 1865 before the expiration of his four-year term. Bristow supported all Union war effort legislation, the presidential election of Abraham Lincoln in 1864, and the passage of the Thirteenth Amendment that outlawed slavery.

== U.S. District Attorney (1866–1870) ==
In 1865, Bristow was appointed assistant to the United States Attorney. In 1866, Bristow was appointed district attorney for the Louisville, Kentucky district. As district attorney, he was renowned for his vigor in enforcing the 1866 U.S. Civil Rights Act. Bristow served as district attorney until 1870 and spent a few months practicing law in partnership with future United States Supreme Court Justice John Harlan.

== First U.S. Solicitor General (1870–1872) ==
=== Prosecuted Ku Klux Klan ===
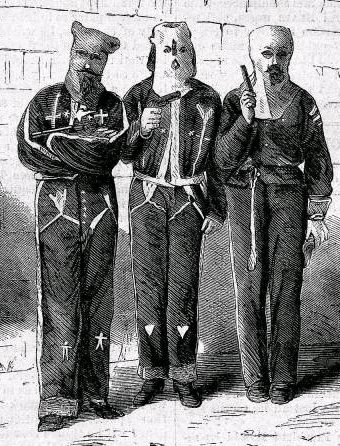
Bristow, America's first Solicitor General, federally prosecuted the Ku Klux Klan 1871

In 1870, Congress created the U.S. Department of Justice, in part, to aid in the enforcement of U.S. Congressional Reconstruction laws and U.S. Constitutional amendments. On October 4, 1870, Bristow was appointed the first incumbent U.S. Solicitor General by President Ulysses S. Grant and served until November 12, 1872, having resigned the office. Bristow and U.S. Attorney General Amos Akerman prosecuted thousands of Klansmen that resulted in a brief two-year quiet period during the turbulent Reconstruction Era in the South. In 1873 President Grant nominated him Attorney General of the United States in case then Attorney General George H. Williams was confirmed as Chief Justice of the United States, a contingency which did not arise.

=== Feud with Akerman ===
On the verge of prosecuting the Ku Klux Klan in mid-September 1871, Bristow in Washington launched a treacherous attack on his boss Akerman's reputation, while Akerman was fighting lawlessness in the South. After Grant returned from a trip to Dayton, Ohio, Bristow, wanting Akerman's cabinet post, told Grant that Akerman was "too small" for the job of Attorney General and he was not respected "by the Court & the profession generally". Bristow went so far as to call Akerman a "dead weight on the administration". Grant was shocked at Bristow's view of Akerman and surprised that Bristow had prodded Grant to get him fired by Grant. Grant refused to consider firing Akerman, telling Bristow that Akerman was thoroughly honest and an earnest man. Grant kept Akerman on the cabinet while Bristow retained his job of Solicitor General.

=== Civil rights speech ===
In 1871, Bristow traveled to his native Kentucky state and in a speech advocated African American civil rights. Bristow advocated that blacks be given the right to testify in juries. At this time Kentucky law forbade the 225,000 black U.S. citizens from testifying in any civil or criminal case involving a white man. He stated the Kentucky law that denied African Americans the right to testify in a white man's case had roots in slavery and was a "monstrous and grievous wrong to both races." Bristow stated that the Ku Klux Klan Act and the previous Civil Rights acts passed by the U.S. Congress were designed to protect the "humblest citizens" from lawbreakers. Bristow stated he would "tax the rich man's property to educate his poor neighbor's child", and he would "tax the white man's property to educate the black man's child." Bristow advocated free universal education and all property in Kentucky be taxed to pay for schools.

== Secretary of the Treasury (1874–1876) ==
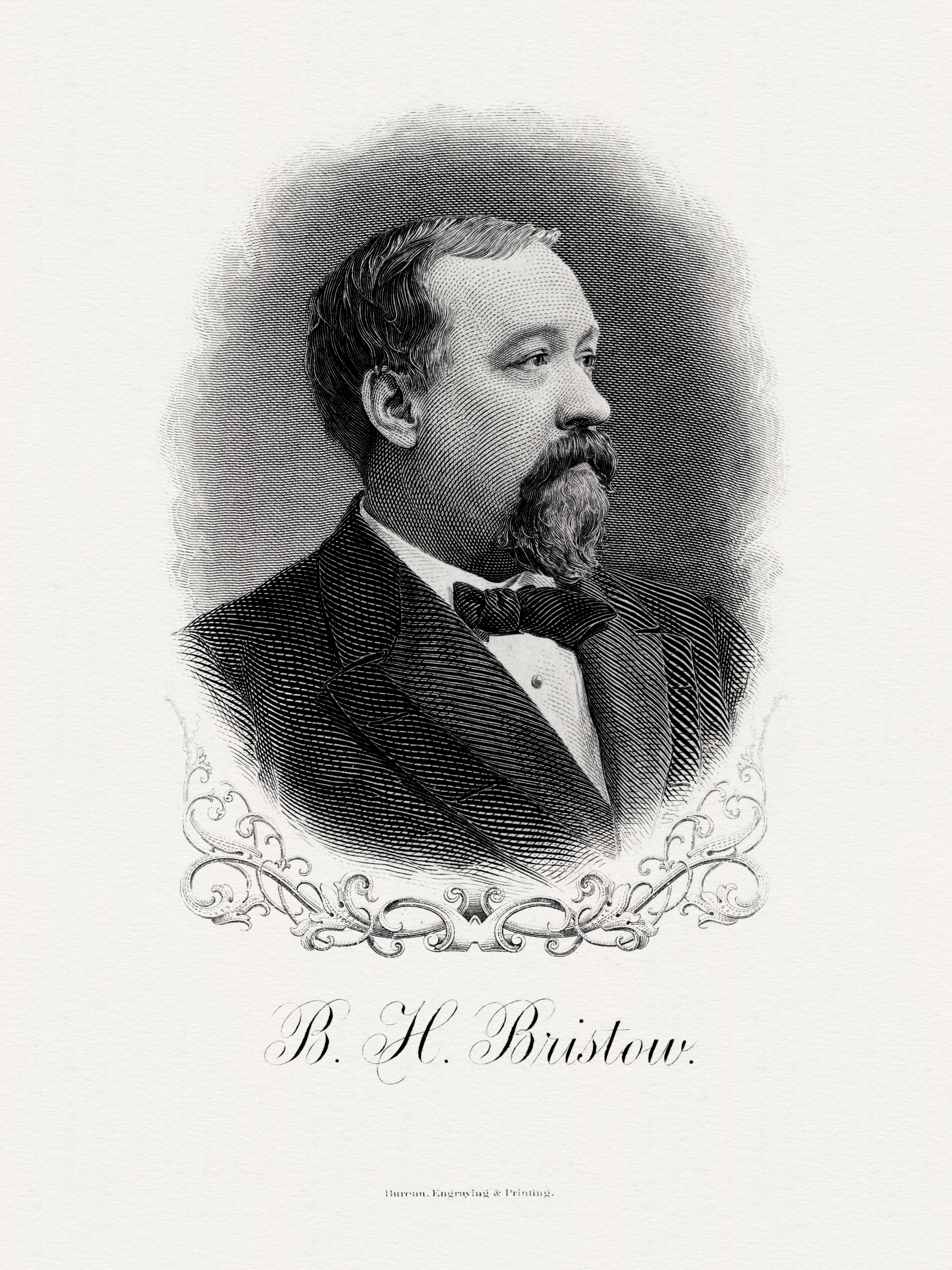
Benjamin Bristow Secretary of Treasury Bureau of Engraving and Printing

On June 3, 1874, President Grant appointed Bristow Secretary of the Treasury after William A. Richardson was removed in light of the Sanborn incident that involved Treasury contract scandals. Bristow was hailed by the press as a much needed reformer. Bristow took control of the Treasury during the Long Depression, that was started by the Panic of 1873. The Republican Party at this time was divided over currency. Bristow supported the hard money North Eastern Republicans and favored a resumption of species (coin money) to replace greenbacks (paper money). President Grant had vetoed the Inflation Bill, on April 22, that would have increased paper money into the collapsed economy. Bristow's support of Grant's veto helped him get nominated for the Treasury by Grant. Sixteen days after Bristow took office, on June 20, Bristow's 42nd birthday, Grant signed a compromise act that legalized $26 million greenbacks released by previous Treasury Secretary Richardson, allowed a maximum of $382 million greenbacks, and authorized a redistribution of $55 million national banknotes. The act had little affect to alleve the devastated economy.

=== Internal reforms made ===
Fulfilling the press's reformer expectation, Bristow immediately went to work. He drastically reorganized the Treasury Department, abolished the corrupt office of supervising architect made famous by Alfred B. Mullett, and dismissed the second-comptroller and his subordinates for inefficiency. Bristow shook up the detective force and consolidated collection districts in the Customs and Internal Revenue Services. He dismissed over 700 people and implemented civil service rules in the Treasury Department.

=== Feud with Robeson ===
Within a few months after Grant appointed Bristow to run the Treasury, Bristow developed a feud with Grant's appointed Secretary of Navy George M. Robeson. The controversy centered around Robeson wanting to have Senator A.G. Cattell appointed financial agent in London to negotiate a bond issue. Cattell had performed a similar service in 1873 under previous Secretary Richardson. Bristow refused to make the appointment and believed a Treasury appointee could do the job. Bristow lobbied Grant to appoint John Bigelow, head of the Treasury Department's Loan Division. Grant accepted Bristow's choice of Bigelow, but he warned Bristow that Bigelow had a previous episode of drunkness. Bristow went further to undercut Robeson's influence in the Grant cabinet. Bristow told Grant that Robeson's Navy Department was financially mismanaged, and was under the control of former treasury secretary Hugh McCulloch's banking house. Bristow's advisers told Bristow to cool things off, and take a less confrontational approach.

=== Feud with Williams ===
Grant's appointed Attorney General George Williams position on the cabinet was not secure, after Williams nomination was withdrawn by Grant for Supreme Court Justice. His personal reputation and that of his wife, Kate Williams, was under public scrutiny. To defend her husband and herself, Kate sent out anonymous letters to slander Grant's cabinet, and others, including alleging sexual misconduct. Cabinet members who had received letters included Secretary of War William Belknap and Secretary of Navy George M. Robeson. Treasury department solicitor, Bluford Wilson, hired H.C. Whitely to investigate Kate and the letters. Wilson, Belknap, and Robeson agreed that Williams had to go. Bristow, supporting Wilson, urged Grant to fire Williams. Secretary of State Hamilton Fish told Grant that Kate had received a bribe of $30,000 from Pratt & Boyd for the Justice Department to drop a case against the company. Grant finally fired Williams, and replaced him with New York reformer Edwards Pierrepont, who cleaned up the Department of Justice.

=== Feud with Delano ===
Columbus Delano Bristow called Delano a "very mean dog".

Columbus Delano was Grant's Secretary of Interior, who allowed corruption in the vast Interior Department. Bristow, a reformer, wanted Delano out of office, believing Delano's departure would establish integrity in the Republican Party. Also, Bristow believed Delano was plotting to remove Bristow from the Interior. Bristow called Delano a "very mean dog" and said Delano deserved the "execration of every honest man." Bristow hired Frank Wolcott to investigate Delano's department, that was ripe with corruption. Wolcott discovered that surveyor general of Wyoming, Silas Reed, had been making contracts with corrupt surveyors who shared enormous profits with silent-partners.

One of those silent-partners was Delano's son John, who had no survey training or work experience. Wolcott sent Bristow damaging evidence against Delano, while Bristow shrewdly turned the documents over to Grant. Although the silent-partner contracts were technically legal, the scandal would embolden the Democrats. By April 1875, Delano had to go, but Grant delayed his resignation for several months. Delano fought back, by revealing information that other cabinet officers wanted Delano to stay in office, in addition to having made a false charge against Bristow. In October 1875, Grant finally replaced Delano with reformer Zachariah Chandler, who cleaned up corruption in the Interior Department.

=== Broke the Whiskey Ring ===
In the Spring of 1875, Bristow began an anti-corruption campaign that would put him in the national spotlight. Bristow's greatest work in the Treasury Department came in prosecution and break up of the notorious Whiskey Ring headquartered in St. Louis The Whiskey Ring was powerful and corrupt machine started by western distillers and their allies in the Internal Revenue Service; it profiteered by evading the collection of taxes on whiskey production. Distillers tended to bribe revenue agents, rather than pay excessive levies on alcohol. Past efforts to uncover the Whiskey Ring were unsuccessful, because ring members in Washington D.C. alerted other ring members of pending investigations. A November 1872 investigation, by three revenue investigators, into St. Louis distilleries, had found significant irregularities, but one agent who was bribed, submitted a whitewashed version of corruption. Despite Washington rumors of its existence, the ring seemed to be impregnable to prosecution.

==== Investigation ====
In the Fall of 1874 Bristow received a $125,000 (~$3.21 million in 2025) appropriation from Congress to investigate the Whiskey Ring. In December 1874, Bristow convinced Internal Revenue Supervisor J.W. Douglas to send a new investigation team, but Grant's private Secretary at the White House, Orville E. Babcock, convinced Douglas to revoke his order. An effort to transfer revenue supervisors, proposed by Douglas, to new locations, to dismantle the ring, was defeated when, out of political objection, Grant suspended the order on February 4, 1875. Grant desired to "detect frauds" that had already been committed by the Whiskey Ring, rather than transfer the supervisors. Bristow, and Grant appointed Treasury Solicitor Bluford Wilson, lost faith in Douglas' willingness to go after the ring, and launched a covert investigation by independent undercover investigators, suggested by revenue agent Homer Yaryan.

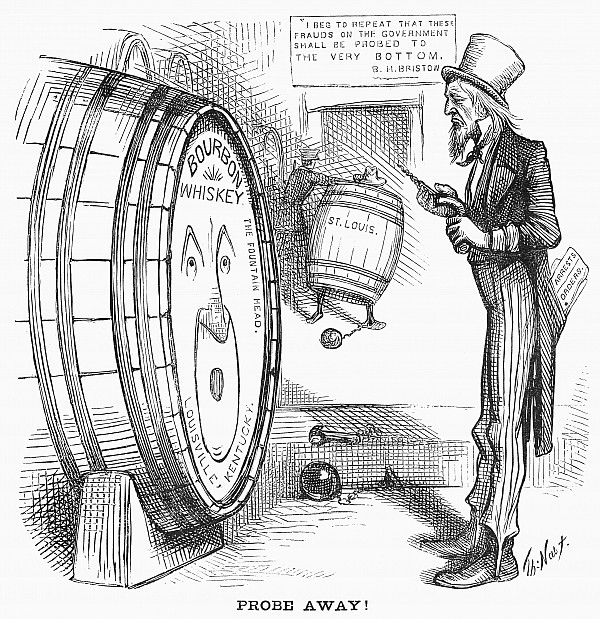
Probe Away ! Thomas Nast Harper's Weekly, March 1876

Political journalist, George W. Fishback, owner of the St. Louis Democrat advised Bristow and Wilson, on how to expose the ring and to bypass any corrupt federal appointees who would tip other ring partners of a federal investigation. Washington correspondent, Henry V. Boynton, also aided Bristow and Wilson in their investigation. Monitored by Wilson, incorruptible investigative agents, that included Yaryan, obtained a vast supply of evidence in St. Louis of frauds committed by the ring. Bristow, in order to secure the enormity of the Whiskey Ring corruption, audited railroad and steamboat cargo receipts for accurate figures of the shipment of liquor in St. Louis and other key cities. To keep the investigation secret from the ring, Bristow gave the agents a cipher different from the Treasury code, while messages were relayed through Fishback and Boynton. Similar investigative work was done in Chicago and Milwaukee. Evidence of fraudulent activity was quickly obtained, into a profiteering scheme, that involved corrupt distillers and revenue agents. To escape taxes, the Whiskey Ring shipped whiskey labelled vinegar, listed whiskey at a lower proof, or illegally used revenue stamps multiple times. As a result, millions of dollars were depleted from the treasury in tax revenues.

Bristow's investigation revealed that Grant appointment, General John McDonald, St. Louis Collector of Internal Revenue, who controlled seven states, was the ring leader. In April 1875, McDonald was called to Bristow's Washington office and confronted by Bristow and showed massive evidence against McDonald, who confessed to being the ring leader. However, after McDonald left Bristow's office, knowing he would be indicted, he unsuccessfully asked Wilson for indemnity from prosecution, and that the corrupt distilleries not be raided. McDonald pleaded that prosecution of the Whiskey Ring would hurt the Republican Party in Missouri. Wilson said later that he would have had McDonald fired on the spot, had he had the authority to do so.

==== Prosecution ====
On May 7, 1875, Bristow gave Grant the investigation findings of corruption by the Whiskey Ring and stressed the need for immediate prosecution. Without hesitation Grant gave Bristow permission to go after the ring, and told Bristow to move relentlessly against all those who were culpable. Three days later, on May 10, Bristow struck hard shattering the ring at one blow. Treasury agents raided and shut down distilleries, rectifying houses, and bottling plants in St. Louis, Chicago, Milwaukee, and six other Mid-Western states. Internal Revenue offices were placed under custody of the Treasury, while thirty-two installations were taken over. Books, papers, and tax receipts were confiscated, that proved and identified individual ring members guilt. Overwhelming evidence against the ring was collected, while federal grand juries produced over 350 indictments.

A Republican Party patronage boss in Wisconsin was linked to corruption found in Milwaukee. Evidence suggested almost every Republican office holder in Chicago profited from illegal distilling. St. Louis proved to be the kingpin city of the Whiskey Ring. In the past six months, $1,650,000 in taxes was evaded, while over two years the tax evasion number reached $4,000,000. Bristow instituted almost 250 federal civil and criminal lawsuits against ring members, and within a year, Bristow, recovered $3,150,000 in unpaid taxes, and obtained 110 convictions on 176 indicted ring members. Chief clerk of the Treasury, Willam Avery, St. Louis revenue collector General John McDonald, and St. Louis deputy collector, John A. Joyce, were indicted and convicted.

==== Babcock's St. Louis trial ====
Bristow's investigation extended into the White House, as evidence suggested Grant's private Secretary, Orville E. Babcock, was a secret and paid informer of the Whiskey Ring. Bristow found two incriminating and cryptic letters signed "Sylph", believed to have been Babcock's handwriting. The first was dated December 10, 1874, that said, "I have succeeded. They will not go. I will write you." The other letter was dated February 3, 1875, that said, "We have official information that the enemy weakens. Push things." In October 1875, Bristow brought the two letters to Grant's cabinet meeting. Babcock was brought in and confronted by both Bristow and Grant's Attorney General Edwards Pierrepont. Babcock said that the messages had to do with the building of the St. Louis Eads Bridge and Missouri politics. Grant accepted Babcock's explanation over the letters. In December 1875, nonetheless, Babcock was formerly indicted in the Whiskey Ring and his trial was set for February 1876 in St. Louis. During the trial President Grant, who believed Babcock was innocent, took a deposition at the White House that defended Babcock, and it was read to the jury in St. Louis. Babcock was acquitted by the jury and he returned to Washington, D.C.

=== Resignation ===
In the aftermath of the Whiskey Ring prosecutions, including Babcock's trial, and an upcoming 1876 presidential election, Bristow's position on Grant's cabinet became untenable. Grant was grieved at Bristow's prosecution of Babcock, whom Grant maintained was innocent. Also, rumors swirled that Bristow prosecuted the Whiskey Ring, to get the Republican nomination, that caused Grant to feel betrayed by Bristow. Largely owing to friction between himself and the president, Bristow resigned his portfolio in June 1876; as Secretary of the Treasury he advocated the resumption of specie payments and at least a partial retirement of "greenbacks"; and he was also an advocate of civil service reform. With his resignation, unlike other Grant appointed cabinet members, such as Ebenezer R. Hoar (Attorney General), Amos T. Akerman (Attorney General), and Marshall Jewell (Postmaster General), Bristow avoided the harsher reality of direct dismissal by Grant.

== Presidential run (1876) ==
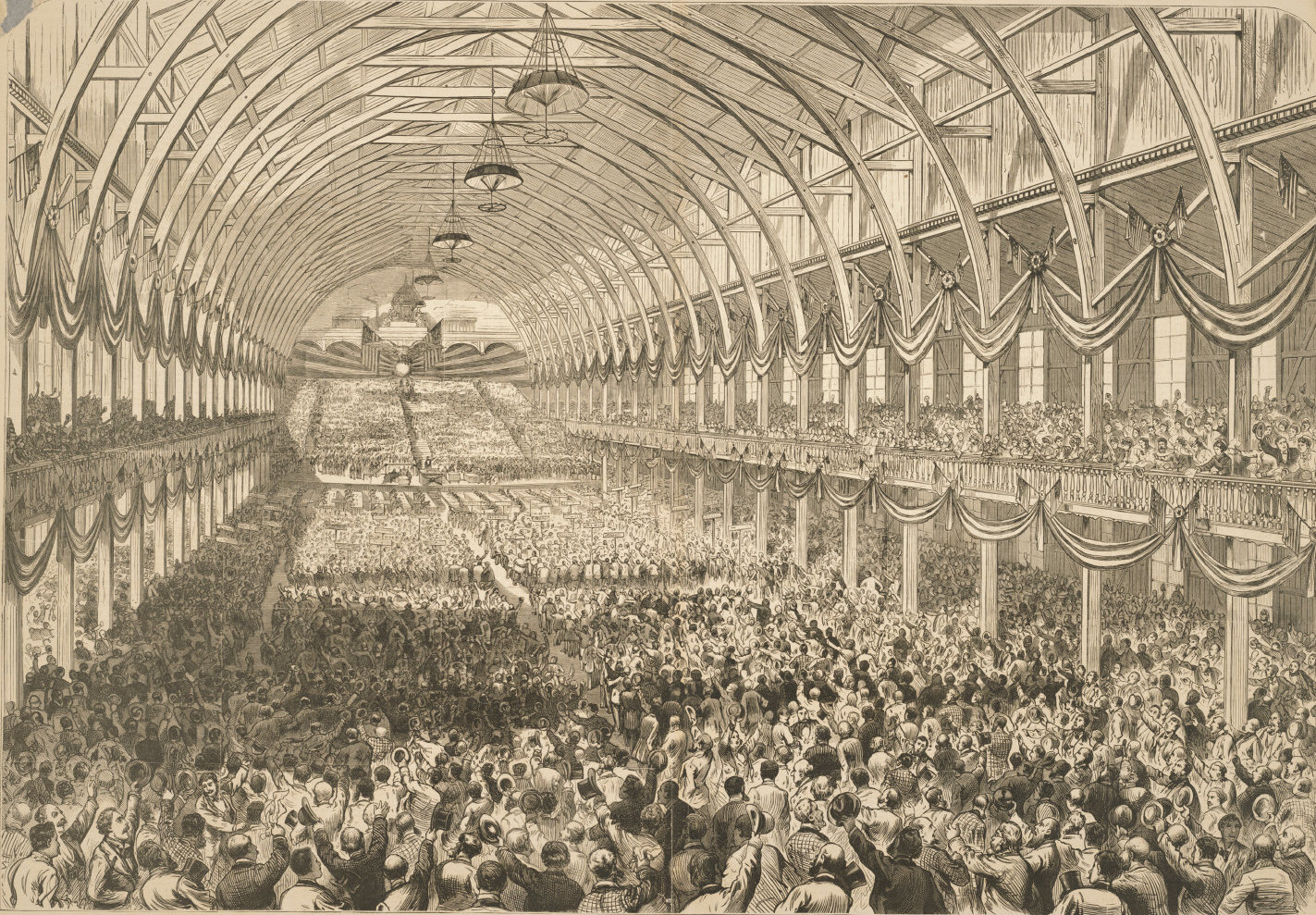
Republican National Convention Cincinnati, Ohio Exposition Hall 1876

Bristow was a prominent reforming candidate for the Republican presidential nomination in 1876 (see U.S. presidential election, 1876). He was defeated at the Republican convention; Rutherford B. Hayes received the nomination. During the 1876 Republican Presidential Convention, Stalwart members of the Republican party, friends of President Grant, believed Bristow had been disloyal to Grant during the Whiskey Ring prosecutions, by going after Babcock. Rumor spread that Bristow had prosecuted the Whiskey Ring in an attempt to gain the 1876 Presidential Republican nomination. Bristow, however, proved to be a loyal statesman and had desired to keep President Grant and the nation from scandal. When Sec. Bristow testified in front of a congressional committee on the Whiskey Ring, he would not give any specific information regarding his conversations with President Grant, having claimed executive privilege.

The 1876 Republican National Convention, was held at Exposition Hall, in Cincinnati, Ohio. On the first Presidential Ballot, Bristow was third, at 113 votes, while James G. Blaine received 285 votes, followed by Oliver P. Morton, at 124 votes. On the fourth Presidential Ballot, Bristow finished second, at 126 votes, his highest number, while Blaine was first, at 292 votes. On the seventh and final Presidential Ballot, Bristow received only 21 votes. Rutherford B. Hayes, was elected the Republican presidential candidate, at 384 votes. Blaine finished a close second at 351 votes.

== New York attorney ==
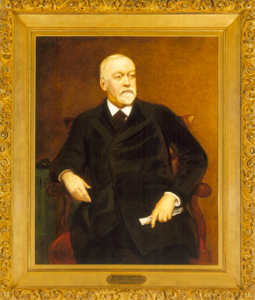
Benjamin Bristow Elder statesman

Bristow was upset over not winning the Republican presidential nomination and over the rumor he had been disloyal to President Grant. Bristow retired from politics, never again to run for political office. After 1878, he practiced law in New York City and on October 16, aged 46, he established the law partnership of Bristow, Peet, Burnett, & Opdyke. Bristow was a prominent leader of the Eastern bar and was elected the second president of the American Bar Association in 1879. Having remained an advocate of civil service reform, Bristow was vice president of the Civil Service Reform Association. Bristow often ably argued in front of the U.S. Supreme Court.

== Death and burial ==
In 1896, Bristow suffered appendicitis and died at his home in New York City on June 22, just two days after his 64th birthday. He was buried at Woodlawn Cemetery, Bronx, New York.

== Historical reputation ==
Historians primarily admire Bristow's prosecution and shutting down the Whiskey Ring during his term as Grant's Secretary of Treasury. Although a lawyer by trade and having no financial training, he was able to rid the Internal Revenue Department of corruption. Bristow demonstrated his ability and in striking down the Whiskey Ring that was supported by powerful political forces. Bristow's zeal for reform, while he was Grant's appointed Secretary of Treasury, was in part motivated by a sincere belief to clean up the Republican Party from corruption, and in part, an ambition to run for the presidency, and be nominated on the 1876 Republican presidential ticket. His prosecutions offended the social and political Republican Party stalwarts who supported patronage, forcing him out of office. As the first Solicitor General Bristow aided in prosecuting the Ku Klux Klan that enabled African Americans in the South to vote freely without fear of violent retaliation. He was born a Southerner in Kentucky, but he lived the remaining years of his life in New York.

Historian Jean Edward Smith said Bristow's appointment to Secretary of Treasury was "one of Grant's best." Smith said Bristow "brought a reforming zeal to the Grant administration, reinforced by a heady dose of ambition that was not out of place for a man in his early forties."

Historian Charles W. Calhoun, had a less positive view of Bristow. Calhoun said Bristow was "ambitious" and had a "contentious nature".

Historian Ronald C. White said Bristow, as Secretary of Treasury, "brought honesty to the position".

Historian Ron Chernow said Bristow was "honest and competent", and: "A zealous advocate of civil service reform".

Historian William S. McFeely said Grant's appointment of Bristow to run the Treasury was "reluctant", and "the department passed into the impeccably clean hands of Benjamin Bristow, a sound money man."

== Sources ==
=== Books ===
- Calhoun, Charles W. (2017). The Presidency of Ulysses S. Grant. Lawrence, Kansas: University Press of Kansas. ISBN 9780700624843. scholarly review and response by Calhoun at DOI: 10.14296/RiH/2014/2270
- Chernow, Ron (2017). Grant. New York: Penguin Books. pp. 751–788. ISBN 978-0143110637.
- McFeely, William S. (1981). Grant: A Biography. Norton. ISBN 0-393-01372-3.
- Nevins, Allan (1929). Dictionary of American Biography Bristow, Benjamin Helm. New York: Charles Scribner's Sons. pp. 55–56.
- Rossiter Johnson, ed. (1906). Biographical Dictionary of America Bristow, Benjamin Helm. Boston: American Biographical Society.
- Smith, Jean Edward (2001). Grant. New York: Simon & Schuster. ISBN 0-684-84927-5.
- White, Ronald C. (2016). American Ulysses: A Life of Ulysses S. Grant. Random House Publishing Group. ISBN 978-1-5883-6992-5.

=== Journals ===
- "Late News". Engineering and Mining Journal. 61: 623. June 27, 1896.

=== New York Times ===
- "Benjamin Helm Bristow" (PDF). New York Times. New York. June 23, 1896.

Legal offices
New title	Solicitor General of the United States; 1870–1872	Succeeded by Samuel F. Phillips
Political offices
Preceded by William A. Richardson	U.S. Secretary of the Treasury; Served under: Ulysses S. Grant; 1874–1876	Succeeded by Lot M. Morrill
