= Benjamin Edwards (stockbroker) =

American stockbroker (1931–2009)

- Born: Benjamin Franklin Edwards III; October 26, 1931; St. Louis, Missouri, U.S.
- Died: April 20, 2009 (aged 77); Naples, Florida, U.S.
- Education: Princeton University
- Occupation: Stockbroker
- Spouse: Joan Moberly Edwards
- Children: 4
- Relatives: Albert Gallatin Edwards (great-grandfather)

Benjamin Franklin Edwards III (October 26, 1931 – April 20, 2009) was an American stockbroker who expanded A. G. Edwards, a brokerage firm founded by his great-grandfather, from a regional firm to a nationwide stockbroking powerhouse, building it into the largest American brokerage firm headquartered outside of New York City. He built what was the world's largest collection of Imari porcelain, a 3,000-piece portion of which was sold at auction for $6 million.

== Biography ==
Edwards was born on October 26, 1931, in St. Louis, Missouri, where he lived his entire life other than during college and military service. His father, Presley W. Edwards, was managing partner of the family brokerage business. His great-grandfather, Albert Gallatin Edwards, was an Assistant Secretary of the Treasury in the administration of Abraham Lincoln, and founded the eponymous firm in 1887. Edwards earned his undergraduate degree from Princeton University in 1953, and did a stint in the United States Navy.

=== A. G. Edwards ===
Edwards joined the syndicate department of the St. Louis company in 1956, working his way up to become president in 1967 when his father retired. He remained in the post until 2001.

During his tenure as president, the company's capital expanded by more than 400 times to US$1.6 billion, and its network expanded to cover 49 states, achieving an annual shareholder rate of return of 15%. He would answer his phone himself and made it his job to visit each of the company's 100 offices each year. He would greet all new employees on their first day with the company and no employee was ever laid off during his time leading the firm. The company was ranked highly on an annual basis on the 100 Best Companies to Work for in America list prepared by Fortune magazine.

As a matter of policy, Edwards would not allow the firm's employees to market proprietary investment instruments such as annuities or mutual funds, or insurance or real estate products, to avoid pressure on customers to buy products marketed by his own firm, preferring to have his brokers sell the best products selected from outside the company.

After 120 years of independence, A. G. Edwards was bought out in 2007 by Wachovia for $6.8 billion, a move that was opposed by Edwards based on concerns that the firm's unique business practices and values would be lost. By the time of Edwards's death in 2009, Wachovia had become a wholly owned financial services subsidiary of Wells Fargo.

Edwards had always threatened that he would open a new firm across the street if his company was ever acquired in a hostile takeover. Edwards's son Tad opened a new self-titled brokerage firm, Benjamin F. Edwards & Company, in 2008, after spending 30 years with the family business. Edwards was given an office at the new company and served on its board of directors.

=== Personal ===
Edwards started collecting furniture, which led to oriental rugs and then to fine Chinese porcelain. He started purchasing 19th-century Japanese and later Chinese hand-painted Imari porcelain and later became involved in Delftware from the Netherlands. He bought three or four pieces each week over a 15-year span, building what was described as the world's largest collection of Imari porcelain.

After hosting the collection in his home, he started amassing a second collection that was kept on display in the A. G. Edwards headquarters building in bookcases that went from floor to ceiling in a museum on the top floor of the company's new building. He put this second collection up for auction after offering it for sale to his firm, which turned him down, and noting that "Antiques pay no dividends or interest" and that he needed the money to fund his retirement. The collection was sold through Christie's for $6 million in a series of auctions that were held in 2003 and 2004. The collection was divided into 242 lots of one or more pieces, with each estimated to range in value from a few hundred dollars to more than $100,000.

Edwards had his primary residence in St. Louis, and had a second home in Naples, Florida. He died at age 77 on April 20, 2009, in Naples, due to prostate cancer. He was survived by his wife Joan Moberly Edwards, to whom he had been married for 55 years, their two sons, two daughters and 11 grandchildren.
