= Jesse B. Thomas Jr. =

American politician (1806–1850)

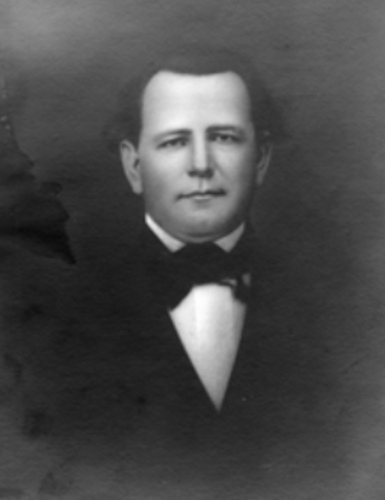
Thomas's portrait at the Illinois Supreme Court.

Jesse Burgess Thomas Jr. (July 31, 1806 – February 21, 1850) was an American politician who served as Illinois Attorney General from 1835 to 1836 and later on the Supreme Court of Illinois.

Thomas was born in Lebanon, Ohio. After studying law at Transylvania University in Lexington, Kentucky, he settled in Edwardsville, Illinois. By 1830, Thomas was serving as the secretary to the Illinois State Senate. Four years later, he served a partial term in the Illinois House of Representatives for Madison County before being appointed Attorney General, a post he held for a single year.

From 1837 through 1839, he was a circuit court judge based in Springfield. His circuit included New Salem, where Thomas heard cases argued by Abraham Lincoln. When Stephen A. Douglas gave up his seat on the Illinois Supreme Court in 1843 after being elected to Congress, Governor Thomas Ford appointed Thomas as Douglas's successor. After retiring from the Supreme Court in 1848, he moved first to Galena and then to Chicago, where he died in 1850.

Thomas's uncle was Jesse B. Thomas, one of Illinois' first senators. Jesse Thomas Jr. was married to Adeline Smith, one of the daughters of Illinois Supreme Court Justice Theophilus W. Smith, and together they had at least seven children.

Legal offices
Preceded by Ninian Wirt Edwards	Attorney General of Illinois; 1835–1836	Succeeded by Walter B. Scates
