= James C. Conkling =

American politician (1816–1899)

James Cook Conkling

Member of the Illinois House of Representatives from the 20th district
- In office 1866 – 1868

Member of the Illinois House of Representatives from the 26th district
- In office 1850 – 1852
- Preceded by: Ninian Wirt Edwards

Personal details
- Born: October 13, 1816 New York City, New York, U.S.
- Died: March 1, 1899 (aged 82)
- Party: Whig; Republican
- Profession: Attorney

Reprint of Lincoln's 1863 letter to Conkling

James Cook Conkling (October 13, 1816 – March 1, 1899) was an American politician and attorney from New York City. A graduate of Princeton College, Conkling was admitted to the bar, then moved to Springfield, Illinois. There, he became a prominent Whig, serving first as mayor and later in the Illinois House of Representatives. In 1856, he became one of the first Republicans in the state, attending the Bloomington Convention with Abraham Lincoln. Twice a presidential elector, Conkling was a State Agent during the Civil War and returned to the Illinois House in 1866. Later in his life he was a postmaster and a trustee of the University of Illinois.

== Biography ==
James Cook Conkling was born in New York City, New York on October 13, 1816. He attended Princeton College and graduated in 1835. He then studied law and was admitted to the bar of New Jersey. He moved to Springfield, Illinois in 1838, where he formed a law partnership with Cyrus Walker. He later partnered with future United States Senator James Shields. In 1844, Conkling was elected mayor of Springfield as a Whig. He was appointed to the Illinois House of Representatives during the 1850–52 term in the 17th Illinois General Assembly to replace Ninian Wirt Edwards.

Conkling was one of four delegates, including Abraham Lincoln, from Sangamon County, Illinois, at the 1856 Bloomington Convention. This was the first official organization of the Republican Party in the state. He was named to its State Central Committee, responsible for overseeing the campaign in the state that year. He was a presidential elector for the Republicans in 1860 and 1864, casting votes for Lincoln. He delivered the dedication address at the opening of the Oak Ridge Cemetery in Springfield. During the Civil War, Governor Richard Yates appointed Conkling a State Agent, responsible for settling claims of the state against the U.S. government for equipping volunteers. In 1863, he read what would become known as the "Conkling Letter", an address written by Lincoln, at a mass gathering in Springfield.

Conkling was elected to the Illinois House for another two-year term in 1866. He authored the bill that would authorize the construction of a new Illinois State Capitol building. Soon after the Assassination of Abraham Lincoln, Conkling was named one of the first fourteen members of the Lincoln Monument Association, where he served for over thirty years. He was elected a trustee of the University of Illinois for the years 1879 to 1880. In 1890, President Benjamin Harrison named Conkling the Postmaster of Springfield. He served the office for four years.

Conkling married Mercie A. Levering on September 21, 1841. They had five children: Clinton Levering, James, Charles, Annie V., and Alice. Eldest son Clinton would be a delegate to the Illinois Constitutional Convention of 1920–21. Conkling attended the Second Presbyterian Church of Springfield and was a longtime elder there. He died on March 1, 1899, in Springfield, and was buried in Oak Ridge.
