= Benjamin E. Grey =

American politician

Benjamin Edwards Grey (1809–1875) was a 19th-century U.S. representative from Kentucky, grandson of Benjamin Edwards.

Born in 1809 at "Shiloh," near Bardstown, Kentucky, Grey pursued an academic course. He studied law, was admitted to the bar and began practice in Hopkinsville, Kentucky. He was a member of the Kentucky House of Representatives from 1838 to 1839, and a member of the Kentucky Senate from 1847 to 1851. He was presiding officer of the senate and Acting Lieutenant Governor in 1850.

Grey was elected as a Whig to the Thirty-second and Thirty-third Congresses (March 4, 1851 – March 3, 1855). He was an unsuccessful candidate for reelection to the Thirty-fourth Congress in 1854. He died in Selma, Alabama in 1875.

U.S. House of Representatives
Preceded by James L. Johnson	Member of the U.S. House of Representatives from Kentucky's 2nd congressional district March 4, 1851 – March 3, 1855	Succeeded by John P. Campbell Jr.
