= John Pope Cook =

American politician (1825–1910)

General John Pope Cook
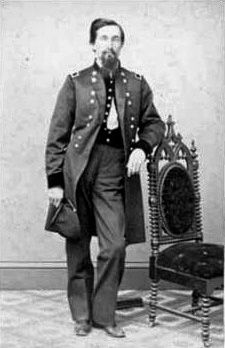
- Born: June 12, 1825; Belleville, Illinois, US
- Died: October 13, 1910 (aged 85); Ransom, Michigan, US
- Military career
- Allegiance: United States of America; Union
- Branch: United States Army; Union Army
- Service years: 1861–1865
- Rank: Brigadier General; Brevet Major General
- Conflicts: American Civil War; Battle of Fort Henry; Battle of Fort Donelson

John Pope Cook (June 12, 1825 – October 13, 1910) was an Illinois politician and a general in the Union Army during the American Civil War. He served in the Western Theater and played a prominent role in securing the Union victory at the Battle of Fort Donelson, helping to force the surrender of the defenders.

He was the second Congressman from Illinois. In 1855 he was mayor of Springfield and 1856 he became the sheriff of Sangamon County. In 1861 he gathered troops after the bombardment of Confederate of Fort Sumter and after that became colonel of the 7th Illinois Volunteer Infantry.

In 1864 he got a promotion to brigadier general.

== Early life ==
Cook was born in Belleville, Illinois, to a well-connected political family. His maternal grandfather, Ninian Edwards, was a United States senator and the Governor of Illinois. His father was Daniel Pope Cook, who was a member of the United States House of Representatives at the time. Following Daniel's death at the age of 33, his widow, Julia Catherine Edwards Cook, moved with their only child, John, back to Belleville, where she died three years later, leaving Cook as an orphan.

Cook received a good education and entered the practice of law. He was elected mayor of Springfield, Illinois, in 1855. Cook was the captain and commander of a military company called the Springfield Grays. He also served as quartermaster general of the Illinois militia.

== Civil War ==
During the early days of the Civil War, Cook's militia company enlisted in Federal service in April 1861. They formed the nucleus of Company I of the 7th Illinois Volunteer Regiment, of which Cook was appointed colonel. At the Battle of Fort Donelson, he commanded the 3rd Brigade, 2nd Division, District of Cairo, Department of the Missouri. During the Confederate breakout attempt on February 15, General Ulysses S. Grant concluded the Confederates must have weakened the opposite flank to reinforce their assault. This weakened sector lay across from the Federal brigades of Cook and Jacob G. Lauman. Lauman's brigade was intended as the main thrust while Cook's brigade would make a feint to draw away fire. Cook's troops nevertheless managed to capture a key Confederate artillery battery, which paved the way for the subsequent collapse of the defensive line in his sector. After the battle he was promoted to brigadier general of volunteers on March 22, 1862, with Senate confirmation on March 24, 1862, to rank from March 21, 1862. Cook remained in command of his brigade for a short time after Fort Donelson. Though still a colonel he was assigned to command the 6th Division in the Army of the Tennessee. This commanded was promptly turned over to Brig. Gen. Benjamin M. Prentiss who would lead the division at Shiloh. Cook meanwhile was transferred to brigade command in the Washington defenses.

Cook later oversaw the military Department of Iowa and Dakota Territory. In the winter of 1862–63, he organized a campaign against the Sioux Nation, with Sioux City, Iowa, as his base of operations. In the spring of 1863, he was relieved by Brig. Gen. Alfred Sully. In November 1864, he was assigned command of the military District of Illinois, replacing Eleazar Paine, who had resigned the position. Cook was mustered out of the volunteers on August 24, 1865. On January 13, 1866, President Andrew Johnson nominated Cook for appointment to the brevet grade of major general, to rank from August 24, 1865, and the U.S. Senate confirmed the nomination on March 12, 1866.

== Years after the war ==
Following the war, Cook returned home and was elected as Sangamon County's representative in the Illinois General Assembly, in 1869, as a Republican.

Cook died in his home near Ransom, Michigan, in 1910.

== See also ==
- List of American Civil War generals (Union)

== Bibliography ==
- Eicher, John H., and Eicher, David J., Civil War High Commands, Stanford University Press, 2001, ISBN 0-8047-3641-3.
- Gott, Kendall D. Where the South Lost the War: An Analysis of the Fort Henry—Fort Donelson Campaign, February 1862. Mechanicsburg, PA: Stackpole Books, 2003. ISBN 0-8117-0049-6.
