= Elijah Iles House =

Historic house in Illinois, United States

- U.S. National Register of Historic Places
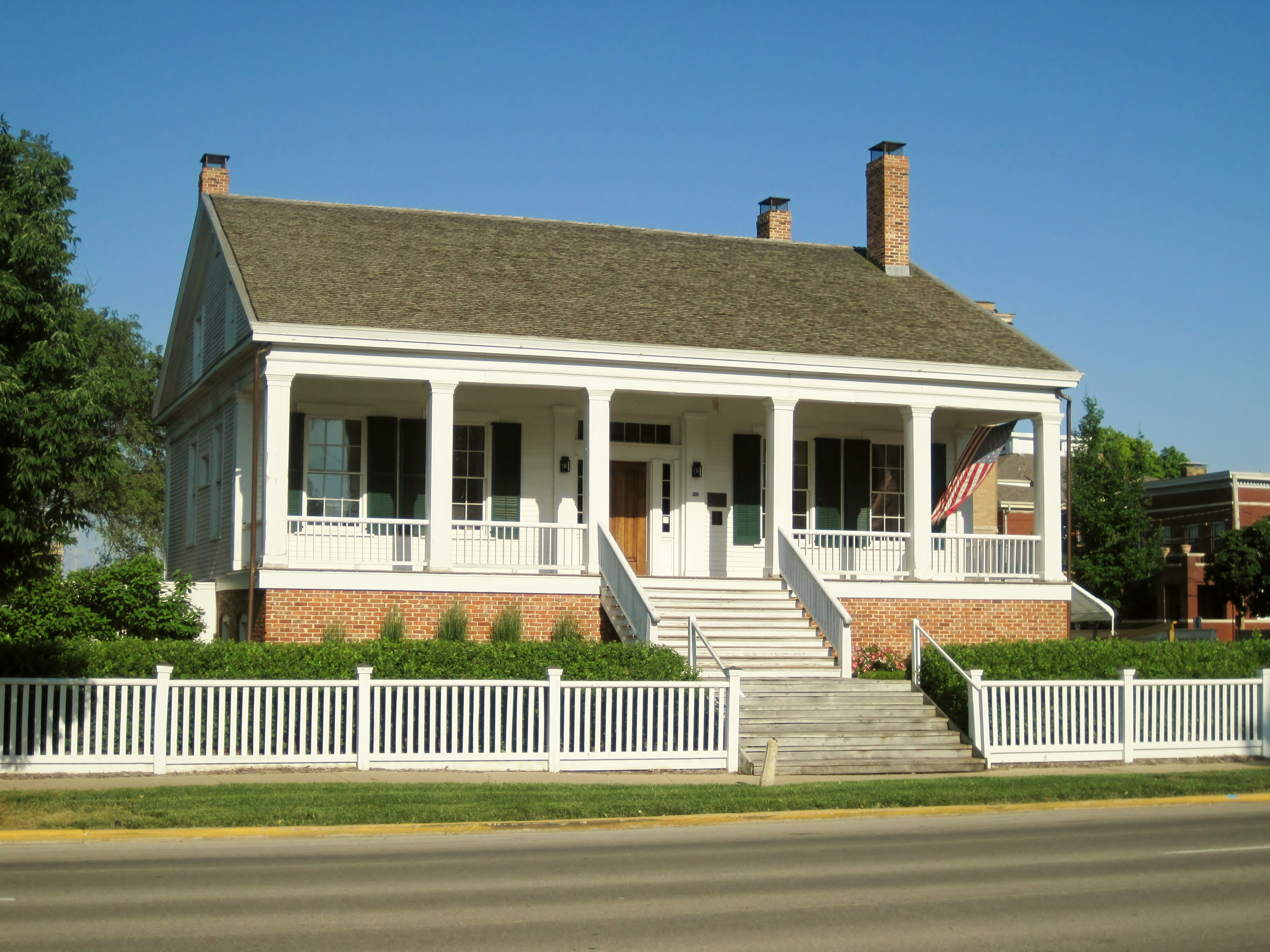

- Location within Illinois Location within the United States
- Location: 628 S. 7th St., Springfield, Illinois
- Coordinates: 39°47′43″N 89°38′47″W
- Area: less than one acre
- Built: 1837
- Built by: Vigal, William
- Architectural style: Greek Revival
- NRHP reference No.: 78001188
- Added to NRHP: February 23, 1978

The Elijah Iles House is a historic house at 628 S. 7th Street in Springfield, Illinois. Built c. 1837, the house has survived nearly intact for 182 years and is the oldest such structure in Springfield. Iles, who moved to Springfield in 1821, was one of the city's earliest settlers. He ran the first store in Sangamon County and helped persuade the county to locate the county seat in Springfield. His house has a Greek Revival design inspired by Southern architecture. It is one of the few Greek Revival residences in Central Illinois. A timber-framed structure on a raised brick foundation, it has three levels: a ground-level basement, the main floor, and a finished attic which provided sleeping quarters.

The interior woodwork is original and makes extensive use of black walnut. To make room for a new church, the house was moved in 1910 and refurbished and modernized with the installation of electricity, plumbing and radiator heating. In 1978, the House was listed on the National Register of Historic Places for its architectural and historic significance. In 1998, the House was moved again to its present location and fully restored, funded almost entirely by private donations. In 2005, with the restoration was complete, the House was open to the public; regular tours are given on Wednesday and Saturday afternoons from April through October. The upper levels house an extensive collection of pre-Civil War furniture, and the lower-level houses the Farrell and Ann Gay Museum of Springfield History, currently exhibiting wristwatches, pocket watches and clocks manufactured by the Illinois Watch Company, a major Springfield factory which operated from 1878 until 1934.

The house is owned by the Elijah Iles House Foundation.
