= Ninian Wirt Edwards =

American politician and lawyer (1809–1899)

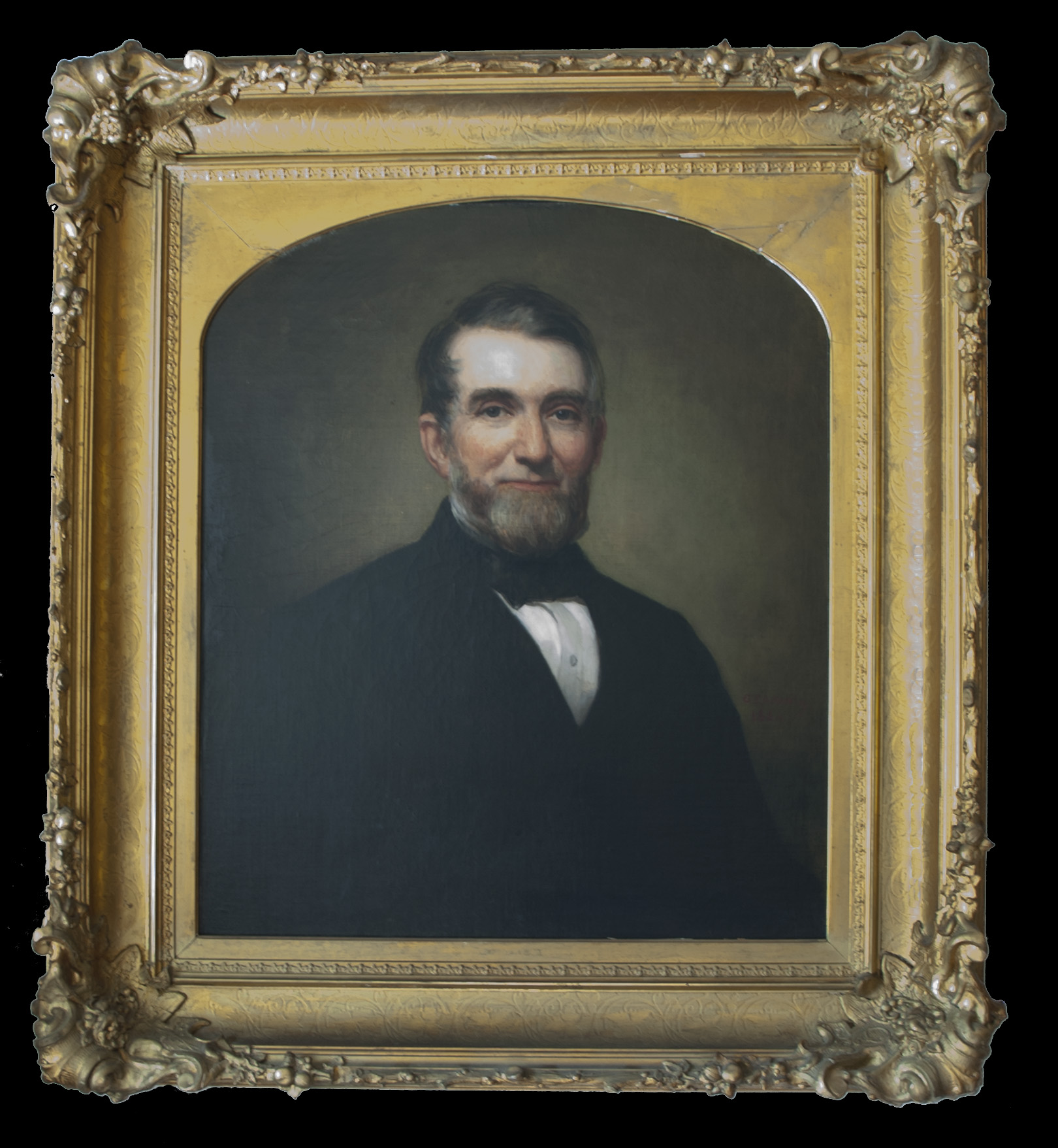
- Portrait of Edwards by George Peter Alexander Healy

1st Illinois State Superintendent
- In office 1854–1857
- Governor: Joel Aldrich Matteson
- Preceded by: office established
- Succeeded by: William H. Powell

7th Illinois Attorney General
- In office 1834–1835
- Governor: Joseph Duncan
- Preceded by: James Semple
- Succeeded by: Jesse B. Thomas Jr.

Member of the Illinois House of Representatives from the Sangamon County district
- In office 1837–1841
- In office 1849–1853
- Succeeded by: James C. Conkling

Member of the Illinois Senate
- In office 1845–1849

Personal details
- Born: April 15, 1809 Franklin County, Kentucky, US
- Died: September 2, 1889 (aged 80) Springfield, Illinois, US
- Party: Whig
- Other political affiliations: Democratic
- Spouse: Elizabeth Todd (m. 1832)
- Relations: Albert Gallatin Edwards (brother); Cyrus Edwards (uncle); Benjamin Edwards (grandfather); Richard Lee Metcalfe (cousin); Theodore W. Metcalfe (cousin)
- Children: Albert S. Edwards
- Parent: Ninian Edwards (father)
- Occupation: Politician, lawyer

Ninian Wirt Edwards (April 15, 1809 – September 2, 1889) was an American politician and lawyer. A Whig and later a Democrat, he was a member of the Illinois General Assembly and served as Illinois Attorney General and Illinois State Superintendent.

== Early life and education ==
Edwards was born on April 15, 1809, in Franklin County, Kentucky, the son of politician Ninian Edwards and Elvira (née Lane) Edwards. He was a brother of businessman Albert Gallatin Edwards. Through his father, he was the nephew of politician Cyrus Edwards and the grandson of politician Benjamin Edwards. He was a cousin of politicians Richard Lee Metcalfe and Theodore W. Metcalfe.

Edwards grew up between Belleville, Edwardsville, and Kaskaskia. In 1833, he graduated from Transylvania University law department. He practiced law for the following two years.

== Politics ==
Edwards was first a Whig, then a Democrat. He was the Illinois Attorney General from 1834 to 1835, resigning in order to move to Springfield. He represented Sangamon County in the Illinois House of Representatives from 1837 to 1841, and again from 1849 to 1853. While in the House of Representatives, he was a member of the "Long Nine" and pushed to have the capitol moved to Springfield. He resigned in 1853 due to switching to the Democratic Party, losing his seat to James C. Conkling.

From 1845 to 1849, Edwards was a member of the Illinois Senate. He was a delegate to the 1847 Illinois State Constitutional Convention, from Sangamon County. From 1854 to 1857, he was Illinois State Superintendent, as which he drafted the first state law regarding schooling.

== Personal life and death ==
On February 18, 1832, Edwards married Elizabeth Todd, the sister of First Lady Mary Todd Lincoln. Through Elizabeth, he was family of President Abraham Lincoln, Nathaniel H. R. Dawson, Benjamin Hardin Helm, and Emilie Pariet Todd. His home, demolished 1918, was where Lincoln Mary Todd married. He and Elizabeth's son was politician Albert S. Edwards. He died on September 2, 1889, aged 80, in Springfield. He was buried at Oak Ridge Cemetery.

Legal offices
Preceded by James Semple	Attorney General of Illinois; 1834–1835	Succeeded by Jesse B. Thomas Jr.
