= Ben Edwards (rugby union) =

Wales international rugby union player

Ben Edwards MBE
- Full name: Benjamin Oswald Edwards
- Born: 29 May 1923 Sudbrook, Wales
- Died: 2 September 1978 (aged 55) Cheltenham, England

Rugby union career
- Position: Lock
International career
Years	Team	Apps	(Points)
1951	Wales	1	(3)

Benjamin Oswald Edwards (29 May 1923 — 2 September 1978) was a Welsh international rugby union player.

Edwards grew up in the village of Sudbrook and was mainly a soccer player in his youth, until being invited to try out with Newport RFC during the war. He became a lock forward and developed a reputation for his long range place kicks, which included a successful 64-yard effort in a match for Newport.

In 1951, Edwards received his solitary Wales cap, during a season in which he set a new Newport points-scoring record. He played the fixture against Ireland in Cardiff and kicked a penalty from just inside the halfway line to open the scoring, with the match finishing in a 3–3 draw. Edward's penalty prevented Ireland from achieving the grand slam.

Edwards ended his rugby career at Ebbw Vale and later settled in Gloucestershire, where he was employed by Imperial Chemical Industries. He volunteered as chairman of his local Outward Bound branch, for which he was awarded an MBE in the 1978 Birthday Honours during the final months of his life.

== See also ==
- List of Wales national rugby union players
