= Inauguration of Abraham Lincoln =

Inauguration of Abraham Lincoln may refer to:

- First inauguration of Abraham Lincoln, 1861
- Second inauguration of Abraham Lincoln, 1865

== See also ==
- The full text of Abraham Lincoln's First Inaugural Address at Wikisource
- The full text of Abraham Lincoln's Second Inaugural Address at Wikisource
