= Benjamin S. Edwards =

American lawyer and judge (1818–1886)

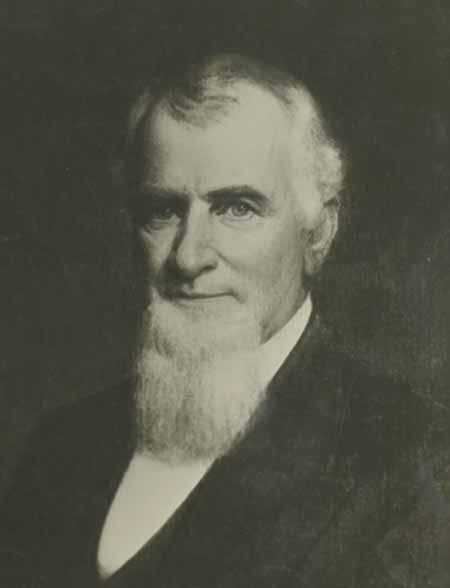
Benjamin S. Edwards

Benjamin S. Edwards (June 3, 1818 – February 4, 1886) was an American lawyer, politician and judge.

== Biography ==
Benjamin S. Edwards was born on June 3, 1818, in Edwardsville, Illinois, the son of Ninian Edwards, who was governor of the Illinois Territory 1809-1818 and governor of Illinois 1826-1830. Edwards was educated at Yale University, graduating in 1838. He then spent a year reading law with Stephen T. Logan, before being admitted to the bar of Illinois in March 1840.

Edwards practiced law for three years, and then, in 1843, set up a law partnership with John T. Stuart that would ultimately last forty years. His law practice would bring him into regular contact with Abraham Lincoln, Stephen A. Douglas, Edward Dickinson Baker, Jesse B. Thomas, and other prominent Illinois lawyers. Edwards gained a reputation as an excellent attorney.

Edwards was active in the Whig Party. In 1862, he served as a delegate from Sangamon County to the Illinois constituent assembly that produced the so-called "Copperhead Constitution" that was ultimately defeated by the voters. Edwards was one of many Whigs who supported Stephen A. Douglas over Abraham Lincoln as a U.S. senator from Illinois, believing that Douglas was more likely to save the Union.

Edwards spent 1869-70 as a judge on Illinois' Thirtieth Judicial Circuit. In 1885, the year before his death, he was elected to serve as president of the Illinois State Bar Association.

Edwards was married to Helen K. Dodge, daughter of Henry Dodge. Edwards' home in Springfield, where he lived from 1843 until his death, was an Illinois social center, and at various points Edwards entertained Ulysses S. Grant, Stephen A. Douglas, Lyman Trumbull, John Hay, Sidney Breese, and other well-known Illinois political figures. In the pre-Civil War period, Edwards routinely hosted annual "legislative parties" that were attended by all members of the Illinois General Assembly. Edwards' home was left to his daughter, who deeded it to the Springfield Art Association in 1913.
