= Daniel Pope Cook =

American politician (1794–1827)

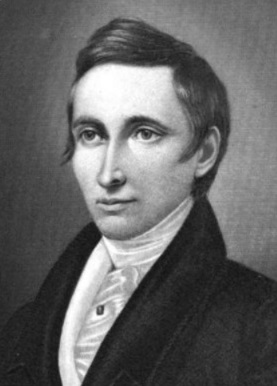
- From Volume 1 (1889) of Illinois, Historical and Statistical

Auditor of Public Accounts of Illinois Territory
- In office 1816-1817
- Preceded by: H.H. Maxwell
- Succeeded by: Robert Blackwell

Illinois Attorney General
- In office 1819
- Preceded by: Position established
- Succeeded by: William Mears

Member of the U.S. House of Representatives from Illinois's at-large congressional district
- In office March 4, 1819 – March 3, 1827
- Preceded by: John McLean
- Succeeded by: Joseph Duncan

Personal details
- Born: 1794 Scott County, Kentucky, U.S.
- Died: October 16, 1827 (aged 32–33) Scott County, Kentucky, U.S.
- Resting place: Oak Ridge Cemetery
- Party: Democratic-Republican (until 1826); National Republican (after 1826)
- Spouse: Julia Catherine Edwards (m. 1821)
- Profession: Politician, lawyer, newspaper publisher

Daniel Pope Cook (1794 – October 16, 1827) was an American politician, lawyer and newspaper publisher from the U.S. state of Illinois. An anti-slavery advocate, he was the state's first attorney general, and then became a congressman. He is the namesake of Cook County, Illinois.

== Early life ==
Daniel Pope Cook was born in 1794 in Scott County, Kentucky, into an impoverished branch of the prominent Pope family of Kentucky and Virginia. Cook moved to Kaskaskia, Illinois in 1815 and took a job as a store clerk, but soon began to read law under the supervision of his uncle, Nathaniel Pope.

== Career ==
Territorial governor Ninian Edwards appointed young Cook the territorial Auditor of Public Accounts in 1816, so Cook moved to Edwardsville, Illinois, and purchased The Illinois Herald newspaper (with Daniel Blackwell) from Matthew Duncan, renaming it The Western Intelligencer. Uncle Nathaniel Pope became a delegate to the U.S. Congress from the Illinois Territory, so upon the election of James Monroe as president, Cook moved to Washington, D.C. to establish his career in the nation's capitol. In 1817 Cook travelled to London to deliver dispatches and bring back John Quincy Adams, the country's representative to Great Britain, whom President Monroe appointed to serve as secretary of state. The two men became closely acquainted during the long voyage back.

Shortly after Cook returned from England, tired of service as a mere dispatch-bearer, he moved back to Illinois, where he became an ardent supporter of statehood. Cook used his newspaper and new appointment as clerk to the territorial house to influence the Territorial Legislature, which unanimously passed a resolution urging statehood (and forbidding slavery) on December 10, 1817. Cook also lobbied his friends back in Washington and Virginia, and his uncle conveyed the territorial resolution to the U.S. Congress on January 16, 1818. After both the U.S. Senate and House agreed, President Monroe on April 18, 1818, signed the law authorizing Illinois to hold a convention to adopt a state constitution and elect officers. On December 3, 1818, President Monroe then signed the law admitting Illinois as the 21st state. Despite his successful advocacy of statehood, Cook was unsuccessful in his first attempt to be elected to the U.S. House of Representatives, losing to John McLean by only 14 votes for the short term remaining after Illinois became a state. However, the new state's legislature appointed Cook as the first attorney general of Illinois. Cook also had briefly served the territory as judge of the western circuit.

Again running for Congress in 1818, Cook defeated McLean in the general election, and again in 1820 (after a debate over slavery), 1822 and 1824, thus serving as the second representative from Illinois (although the first to serve a full term). While in Congress, Cook served on the Committee on Public Lands and later on the Ways and Means Committee. He secured a grant of government lands to aid in the construction of the Illinois and Michigan Canal. In the 1824 election, Cook also helped defeat a proposed convention to legalize slavery in Illinois, and at year's end helped elect John Quincy Adams as President (by one vote when the election was thrown to the House). Cook, in ill-health, campaigned little in 1826, and while he again scored more votes than McLean, the pro-slavery Jacksonian Democrat, Joseph Duncan, won the election. The following spring, President Adams sent Cook on a diplomatic mission to Havana, Cuba, but that did not restore his health. He returned to Edwardsville, and asked to be taken back to his birthplace in Kentucky.

== Family ==
On May 6, 1821, Cook married Julia Catherine Edwards, the daughter of his mentor Ninian Edwards (who was related by marriage to the Pope family of Kentucky). After Daniel Cook died, Julia Cook moved back to Belleville, Illinois, but only survived her husband by three years. Their son, John Cook (born 1825), remained true to the family's anti-slavery principles and became mayor of Springfield, Illinois, in 1855, brigadier general for Union forces in the Civil War and state representative for Sangamon County, Illinois.

== Death and legacy ==
Daniel Cook, who always suffered from poor health, died on October 16, 1827, at the age of 32 in Scott County, Kentucky. Three years after his death, Cook County, Illinois, was named in his honor.

Political offices
Preceded by H. H. Maxwell	Illinois Territory Auditor of Public Accounts; 1816	Succeeded by Robert Blackwell
Preceded by Office created	Illinois Attorney General; 1819	Succeeded by William Mears
U.S. House of Representatives
Preceded by John McLean	Member of the U.S. House of Representatives from Illinois's at-large congressional district March 4, 1819 – March 3, 1827	Succeeded by Joseph Duncan
