= Albert Gallatin Edwards =

American businessman and government official (1812–1892)

Albert Gallatin Edwards (October 15, 1812 – April 19, 1892) was an Assistant Secretary of the United States Department of the Treasury under President Abraham Lincoln and founder of brokerage firm A. G. Edwards.

Edwards was born in Kentucky, on October 15, 1812, to politician Ninian Edwards, and was named after Secretary of the Treasury Albert Gallatin. He graduated from the United States Military Academy and was stationed near St. Louis. There he met Louise Cabanne—relative of fur trader Jean-Pierre Cabanne—whom he married in 1835. Following his marriage, Edwards resigned from the military and entered the wholesale business.

Edwards fought for the Union during the American Civil War and was rewarded for his effort by President Lincoln who named him United States Assistant Secretary of the Treasury in April 1865. In 1887, he founded the brokerage firm that bore his name, A. G. Edwards, which was absorbed into Wachovia in 2007. He died on April 19, 1892, aged 79, and is buried at Bellefontaine Cemetery in St. Louis.
