= Ninian Edwards =

American politician (1775–1833)

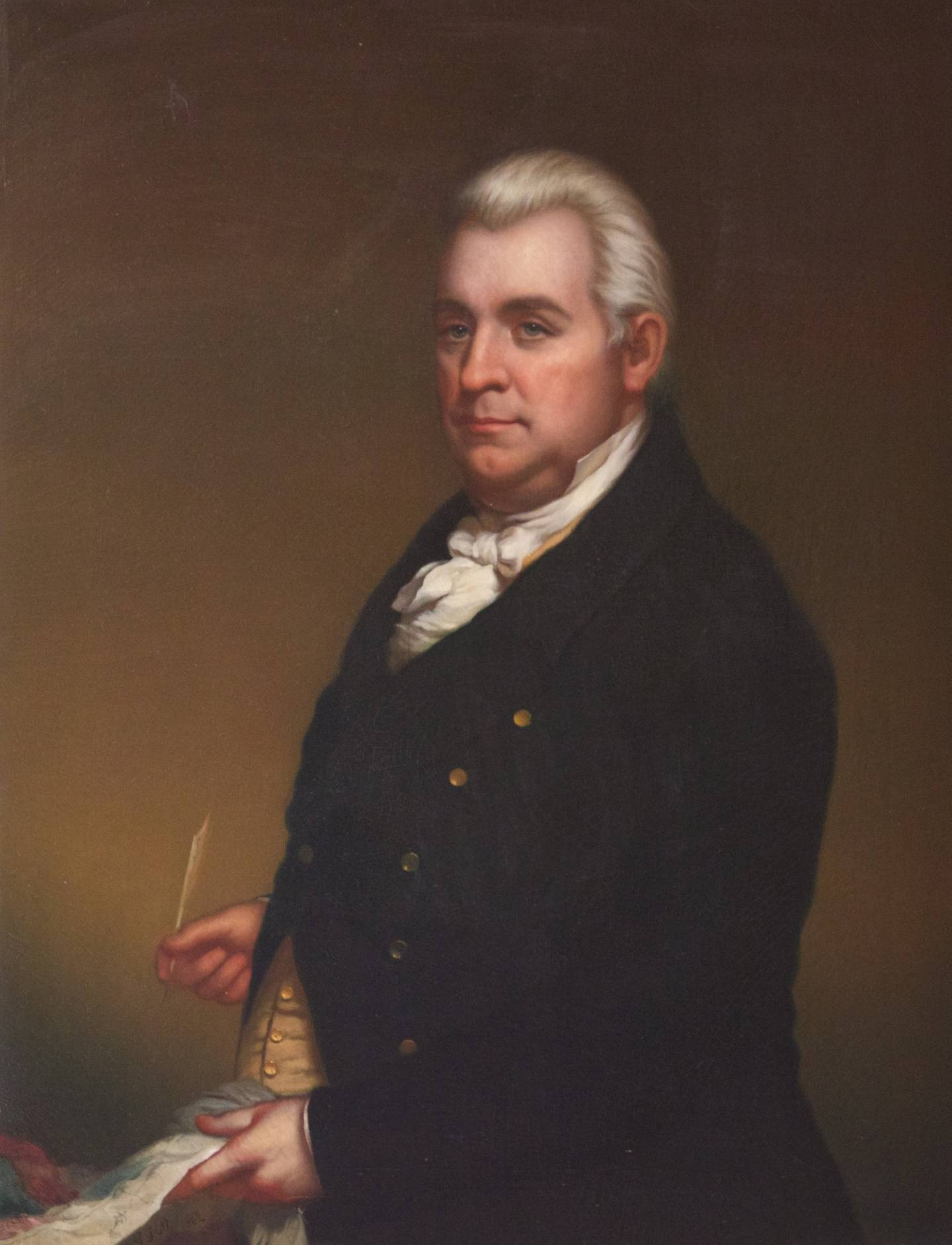
- Edward's Portrait in the Illinois State Capitol's Hall of Governors

3rd Governor of Illinois
- In office December 6, 1826 – December 6, 1830
- Lieutenant: William Kinney
- Preceded by: Edward Coles
- Succeeded by: John Reynolds

United States Senator from Illinois
- In office December 3, 1818 – March 4, 1824
- Preceded by: Office established
- Succeeded by: John McLean

Governor of Illinois Territory
- In office June 11, 1809 – October 6, 1818
- Preceded by: Office established
- Succeeded by: Office abolished Shadrach Bond as Governor of Illinois

Chief Justice of the Kentucky Court of Appeals
- In office 1806–1809
- Preceded by: Thomas Todd
- Succeeded by: John Boyle

Member of the Kentucky House of Representatives
- In office 1794

Personal details
- Born: March 17, 1775 Montgomery County, Maryland, British America
- Died: July 20, 1833 (aged 58) Belleville, Illinois, U.S.
- Party: Democratic-Republican
- Spouse: Elvira Lane
- Children: Ninian, Albert, Benjamin, Julia
- Relatives: Cyrus Edwards (brother)

Ninian Edwards (March 17, 1775 – July 20, 1833) was an American political figure who was prominent in Illinois. He served as the first and only governor of the Illinois Territory from 1809 to until the territory earned statehood in 1818. He was then one of the first two United States senators from the State of Illinois from 1818 to 1824, and the third governor of Illinois from 1826 to 1830. In a time and place where personal coalitions were more influential than parties, Edwards led one of the two main factions in frontier Illinois politics.

Born in Maryland, Edwards began his political career in Kentucky, where he served as a legislator and judge. He rose to the position of Chief Justice of the Kentucky Court of Appeals in 1808, at the time Kentucky's highest court. In 1809, U.S. President James Madison appointed him to govern the newly created Illinois Territory. He held that post for three terms, overseeing the territory's transition first to democratic "second grade" government, and then to statehood in 1818. On its second day in session, the Illinois General Assembly elected Edwards to the U.S. Senate, where conflict with rivals damaged him politically.

Edwards won an unlikely 1826 election to become Governor of Illinois. Conflict with the legislature over state bank regulations marred Edwards' administration, as did the pursuit of Indian removal. As governor or territorial governor he twice sent Illinois militia against Native Americans, in the War of 1812 and the Winnebago War, and signed treaties for the cession of Native American land. Edwards returned to private life when his term ended in 1830 and died of cholera two years later.

== Early life ==
Ninian Edwards was born in 1775 to the prominent Edwards family in Montgomery County, Maryland. His mother, Margaret Beall Edwards, was from another prominent local family. His father Benjamin Edwards served in the Maryland House of Delegates, in Maryland's state ratifying convention for the U.S. Constitution, and in the United States House of Representatives, filling a vacant seat for two months. He was of Welsh descent. Ninian was educated by private tutors, one of whom was the future U.S. Attorney General William Wirt. He attended Dickinson College from 1790 to 1792 but did not graduate, leaving college to study law. His son Ninian Wirt Edwards wrote later that Edwards spent some of his time at Dickinson reading medicine, a field to which he devoted considerable time in his later years.

In 1794, at the age of 19, Edwards moved to Nelson County, Kentucky to manage some family land. He showed a great aptitude for business and leadership and was soon elected to a seat in the Kentucky House of Representatives, before he was even eligible to vote. In 1802 he was awarded the rank of major in the militia. In 1803 he moved to Russellville, Kentucky, and won a succession of public offices: circuit court judge in 1803, presidential elector in 1804 (voting for Thomas Jefferson), and judge and finally chief justice of the Kentucky Court of Appeals, which at the time was Kentucky's highest court. He joined the high court in 1806 and won the leadership position in 1808.

A well-educated landowning aristocrat, Edwards deliberately cultivated the image of the natural leader. Thomas Ford writes that he continued to dress like an 18th-century gentleman long after such fashions had gone out of style, and that his public speaking was marked by showy eloquence. Edwards consciously positioned himself in the select class of men who dominated Kentucky and, later, Illinois politics. In 1803 in Russellville, Edwards married Elvira Lane, a relative from Maryland.

== Territorial governorship ==
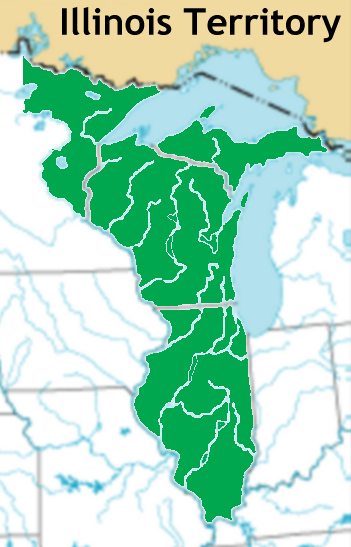
Map of the Illinois Territory. Modern state borders are shown. The subsequent State of Illinois is in the lower half.

The Illinois Territory was created in 1809. It included all of what today are the states of Wisconsin and Illinois, as well as parts of Minnesota and Michigan. Its European-American and African-American populations were almost entirely concentrated in the south, in the region later known as Egypt. President James Madison first appointed Kentucky politician John Boyle as its governor. Boyle collected his salary for the position for 21 days but then resigned to take Edwards' job as Kentucky Chief Justice, while friends in Washington helped secure Edwards' appointment as territorial governor. In the meantime, Territorial Secretary Nathaniel Pope, a cousin of Edwards, had to assume the powers of acting governor, creating Illinois' first counties and appointing officials to form the new government. Only 34 years old at the time of his appointment, Ninian Edwards is the youngest man ever to govern Illinois as either a state or a territory.

Edwards settled in the American Bottom on land he received as a grant upon his appointment as governor. He named his new farm Elvirade, after his wife. Along with his family, Edwards brought a number of slaves, whom he did not free even though the Northwest Ordinance of 1787 had made slavery illegal in the territory. An 1803 "Law Concerning Servants" had been promulgated for the Indiana Territory by then-Governor William Henry Harrison that maintained the status of people brought into the territory "under contract to serve another in any trade or occupation." The law, which remained in force in the Illinois territory, permitted slavery to persist for decades under the guise of indentured servitude. Most of Illinois' early governors were slaveowners, and Edwards was no exception. In 1812, Edwards offered for sale, "several likely young negro men and women." Later, he made extra income by renting some of his "indentured servants" out for labor in Missouri. In 1814, he "sold my mulatto boy slave named Wallace now in possession of Harry of Ste. Genevieve Missouri Territory to Theodore Hunt. In 1815, he was seeking to sell his "Mulatto Boy" for $400.

The new territorial governor was sworn in on June 11, 1809. At first Edwards tried to avoid partisanship but soon found that faction was an inevitable result of his power to appoint officials and distribute government jobs. Although the First Party System continued to define national politics, the Federalist and Republican Parties never took hold in frontier Illinois. Rather, factional loyalties were created by personality, personal bonds such as kinship and militia service, and especially the distribution of patronage. In the early territorial years, two rival factions grew up around Edwards and Judge Jesse B. Thomas. These two factions formed Illinois' political landscape during its time as a territory and for its first several years of statehood.

=== Democratic government ===
Throughout Edwards' three terms as governor, he showed a willingness to surrender his own considerable powers in order to expand participatory government in the Illinois Territory. Before 1812, while Illinois had a first-grade territorial status, Edwards had vast powers to appoint county and local officials; however, he made it his practice to consider local opinion as much as he could when making appointments, often giving weight to petitions signed by local residents. He attempted to do the same for militia officers for a time, letting the men of a unit elect their leaders, but he soon abandoned this policy as impractical.

In 1812, Edwards successfully persuaded Congress to modify a provision of the 1787 Ordinance limiting voting rights to freeholders of 50 acres (20 ha) of land. Due to long-running disputes over fraudulently sold lands, very few Illinois frontiersmen could qualify. At Edwards' urging, Congress granted the Illinois Territory universal white male suffrage, making it the most democratic U.S. territory at the time. In April, Edwards held a referendum on moving to second-grade government, allowing the people of Illinois to elect a legislature and a non-voting delegate to Congress. The referendum passed, and elections were held in October that sent Shadrach Bond to Washington as Illinois' first congressional delegate.

=== War of 1812 ===
Edwards had not been governor long when Illinois became the scene of fighting during the War of 1812. Relations between Illinois settlers and Native Americans worsened throughout the territory during 1810 and 1811. By June 1811, Governor Edwards ordered the construction of a series of blockhouses and called out three companies of militia.

This action was the result of tensions that were created from a brutal murder that occurred on June 2, 1811, at a settlement cabin two miles northeast of Pocahontas, Illinois. Three Potawatomi Natives stormed the home and found twenty-year-old Elijah Cox and his younger sister, Rebecca. The assailants sliced the scalp from Elijah and removed his heart. The raiding party was looking for money after a failed raid on the nearby tribe of Osage. The men captured Rebecca, robbed the home and set out north for tribal controlled lands. A militia was sent to intercede and rescued Rebecca shortly south of Springfield. One more violent interaction occurred prior to the end of the month to stoke the flames of war. On June 20, 1811, in what is now Lower Alton, five Menominee Natives approached two locals, Price and Ellis. Price, believing the Natives to be friendly allowed them into their camp. Unfortunately, Price was killed; Ellis was able to escape on horse to the Wood River settlement. These murders brought panic to frontier families and fueled unfounded rumors of more murder and mayhem in the territory. This fear did result in the death of at least one Native chief. A group of five Potawatomi Natives were traveling down river at Alton when they were viewed by Michael Squires, a ferry operator. He opened fire on the group when they approached too closely.

Governor Edwards acted quickly to attempt to maintain peace, ordering the militia to “erect a chain of block houses in advance of the settlements at about twenty miles from each other commencing on the bank of the Illinois River, and a sufficient force to be distributed among them, with orders to scout from one to another every day.” The most prominent of these new blockhouses was constructed during the summer of 1812 by Colonel William Russell and named Camp Edwards in honor of the Governor, although it would commonly be known as Fort Russell. Its importance was due to its strategic location between the Mississippi River and Kaskaskia River. Governor Edwards spent considerable time at the fort, and while he was the commander-in-chief of the militia, he had very little military expertise or Native American knowledge.

The declaration of war and the Battle of Fort Dearborn in 1812 convinced Edwards that Potawatomi and Kickapoo in the territory were preparing to launch a major attack on the southern settlements. This assumption followed the Natives' stalled offensive of August and September 1812. The suspected target was Peoria, Illinois, where Native American tribes – Kickapoo, Potawatomi, and Piankashaw – had assembled in large numbers, and from where they recently undertook failed raids on American settlements. Edwards lacked assistance from outside the territory and instead relied on his own resources. Edwards estimated there were no more than 2,000 adult white males between the Mississippi and Wabash Rivers, while there were more than 1,000 Native tribesmen able to assemble at Peoria in a matter of days. In order to establish a militia, Edwards pledged his own resources to assure payment to militia volunteers.

In his capacity as commander in chief, Edwards gathered 350 mounted rangers and volunteers near Edwardsville and personally led an expedition north to Peoria. His senior staff included many of the territory's most prominent citizens. These included Nathaniel W. Pope, territorial secretary, Benjamin Stephenson, Thomas Carlin, future Illinois Governor, and William, Elias, and Nelson Rector. The company was divided into two smaller regiments, one commanded by Stephenson acting as Colonel, the other by a Rector brother. Edwards and his army departed Fort Russell from Edwardsville on October 18, 1812. After crossing into Logan County, Edwards’ army encountered two deserted Kickapoo villages near present-day Salt Creek, formerly known as the Saline Fork of the Sangamon River. The regiment discovered native artwork, some of which depicted the scalping of American settlers. The regiment burned both abandoned villages.

After burning the two Kickapoo villages on the Sangamon River along the way, the militia advanced on Peoria itself. The village the army was preparing to attack was recently developed at the head of Peoria Lake and inhabited by Piankashaw and Kickapoo Natives likely led by Chief Pemwatome. At dawn, the army advanced. Edwards inflicted a devastating defeat to the Native American village. Edwards’ army seized eighty horses, some recently stolen from Saint Clair County, silver ornaments, 200 brass kettles, guns, and six scalps believed to belong to the women and children of the settler O’Neal family from Missouri. Edwards estimated that approximately thirty Native peoples were killed in the raid, although later estimates from the Kickapoo suggested the number was closer to eighty.

All told, the short campaign burned several villages and inflicted dozens of casualties before returning to Edwardsville on October 31, 1812. The attack angered both the Peoria villagers and the U.S. government because it had been carried out against Native Americans loyal to Black Partridge and Gomo, two leaders who had not joined Tecumseh's War and were considered friendly to U.S. interests. A second attack under Captain Thomas Craig killed a large number of French settlers from Peoria as well as Potawatomi. In 1813, Illinois and Missouri militia joined a force of United States infantry under Benjamin Howard to drive all Native American villagers away from Peoria and establish Fort Clark.

Edwards' actions alienated those Native Americans friendly to the U.S. in the region. Ninian Edwards, having lost the confidence of the Madison administration, waited out the war in Kentucky. However, he was reappointed to a second and then a third term as territorial governor in 1812 and 1815, and he was also named one of the three U.S. negotiators of the Treaties of Portage des Sioux in 1815.

=== Second and third terms ===
During his nine years as territorial governor, Edwards made a good deal of money through several profitable ventures, including farming, land speculation, and investment in sawmills, grist mills, and stores.

Edwards' political rivalry with Jesse B. Thomas continued for the rest of his time as governor. Edwards, along with much of the legislature, criticized the territory's judges for their inactivity. Among their complaints were that the judges did not hold court often enough and spent too much time absent from the territory. The legislature passed a bill in 1814 to reform the territory's judicial system. The judges refused to acknowledge the act, claiming that they were outside the jurisdiction of the legislature. In 1815 the issue was resolved by Congress, which passed a law supporting Edwards and the legislature.

In December 1817, Edwards, responding to a movement for statehood led by his ally Daniel Pope Cook, recommended to the legislature that Illinois apply for admission to the Union. He also recommended that a census first be taken of the territory, a standard practice, but the legislature rejected this. Legislators, particularly those opposed to slavery, feared that any delay would allow Missouri to apply for statehood before Illinois, and that since Missouri was a slave state, this would cause so much turmoil in Congress that it would delay Illinois' admission even longer.

In order to emphasize to Congress that Illinois would be a free state, the legislature passed in January 1818 a bill that would both abolish Illinois' "indentured servant" system of de facto slavery, and prohibit Illinois' future Constitution from reinstating it. Governor Edwards issued his only veto to send the bill back to the legislature, and it was never revised. He made his objections on constitutional grounds, but he also had a conflict of interest as the owner of several enslaved people himself.

During Edwards' terms as territorial governor, Illinois' population more than tripled, from 12,282 in 1810 to 40,258 in 1818 (a census was finally conducted later that year). The population did not meet the 60,000 threshold the Northwest Ordinance required for a new state, but both Illinoisans and Congress expected continued growth.

== Senate career ==
Illinois quickly proceeded along the steps to statehood. Its constitution was finished in August 1818; elections were held in September; and in October, the first General Assembly met in Kaskaskia. On October 6, Ninian Edwards stepped down, and Shadrach Bond was inaugurated as Illinois' first governor. The following day the new state legislature voted for Illinois' two members of the U.S. Senate. Edwards was quickly chosen on the first ballot; his rival Thomas was only elected after the fourth. Edwards and Thomas then drew straws to determine their respective terms: Thomas was placed in Class II of the Senate and could serve until 1823, while Edwards was placed in Class III and had to face reelection in February 1819. Edwards and Thomas still had to wait for Congress to formally ratify Illinois' constitution and admission to the Union, which it did on November 25. On December 3 the two senators were finally seated, leaving Edwards with a mere three months in his first term.

Edwards' re-election was more difficult. In four months he had lost the temporary support of Thomas' allies in the General Assembly who had voted for him in 1818. He narrowly defeated Thomas partisan Michael Jones by a vote of 23–19. This may have been due to the influence of the powerful Secretary of State Elias Kane, a Thomas ally.

Like most members of Congress during the Era of Good Feelings, Senator Edwards sat as a member of the Democratic-Republican Party. As his second term drew on, he joined the Adams-Clay faction that would develop into the National Republicans after Edwards left office. Edwards voted for the Missouri Compromise in 1820, a bill that Thomas sponsored. He voted against a law reducing prices for federal land, which made both Edwards and Representative Daniel Pope Cook targets of criticism at home. On May 6, 1821, Cook married Edwards' daughter Julia.

Ninian Edwards caused trouble for himself when he wrote several articles in the Washington Republican under the pseudonym "A.B." that attacked U.S. Treasury Secretary William H. Crawford. Edwards alleged that Crawford had known of the impending failure of Illinois' Bank of Edwardsville in 1821, but had not withdrawn federal money from it. Edwards found that none of Crawford's rivals was willing to support his charges, and he was unable to produce corroborating evidence. He resigned his Senate seat on March 4, 1824, to take a job he wanted as the first United States Minister to Mexico. While en route to his new position, Edwards was called back to Washington to testify before a special House committee concerning the "A.B. Plot". Unable to substantiate his claims, Edwards resigned his diplomatic post, to be replaced by Joel Roberts Poinsett.

Back in Illinois, Edwards settled in Belleville, a town whose site he had once owned before selling off its lots at a profit.

== State governorship ==
=== Election of 1826 ===
When he returned to Illinois, Edwards appeared to be a discredited politician. He no longer had a loyal coalition in the General Assembly to re-elect him to the U.S. Senate. His actions in the "A.B. Plot" had made him lose favor with President Adams; therefore he could not expect another federal appointment. In addition, supporters of Andrew Jackson were becoming a force in Illinois politics. Illinois frontier voters so admired Jackson that soon, for the first time, they would give their support to a national party, the Democrats. Ninian Edwards never criticized Jackson, but as an Adams-Clay Republican Senator he was not part of Jackson's growing coalition. Jacksonians deeply resented Edwards' ally Cook, who had voted against Jackson when the presidential election of 1824 was decided in the House of Representatives.

However, when he ran for governor in 1826, Edwards had the good fortune to enter a three-way race that split the Jacksonians between state Senator Thomas Sloo and Lieutenant Governor Adolphus Hubbard. As a campaign issue, Edwards focused on Illinois' dire financial situation, blaming Sloo and Hubbard and other legislators for it. Edwards won 49.5 percent of the vote to Sloo's 46 percent, with the rest going to Hubbard.

=== Administration ===
Edwards' gubernatorial term was another period of rapid growth for Illinois. In the decade from 1820 to 1830, the population again nearly tripled from 55,211 to 157,445. During this era, Illinois was the fastest-growing territory in the world.

Edwards' administration was hampered by his conflict with the legislature, primarily over the struggling Bank of Illinois. The bank had been established in 1821, and from the beginning it had been underfunded, its notes had badly depreciated, and it had helped put the state deeply in debt. In his inaugural address Edwards undiplomatically attacked bank officials and politicians alike, accusing them of fraud and perjury. From that point, Edwards had a poor relationship with the General Assembly. During his term the Assembly did eventually pass a bank regulation bill, but it also passed a measure to relieve debtors despite Edwards' objections that the state could not afford it.

In 1827 Illinois established its first penitentiary, at Alton. That same year, the state received a federal land grant to build the Illinois and Michigan Canal, though work did not begin for several years.

Also in 1827, Edwards ordered the Illinois militia to join another war against Native Americans in northern Illinois. The Winnebago War, fought between white settlers and members of the Ho-Chunk tribe, broke out in Wisconsin (then part of the Michigan Territory) but spread to the lead-mining region around Galena. Edwards dispatched the militia and ordered 600 more men to be recruited in Sangamon County. The show of force convinced the Ho-Chunk to surrender.

After the war, Edwards urged the federal government to remove the remaining Native Americans from northern Illinois, claiming that their presence violated "the rights of a sovereign and independent state", and hinting that he might dispatch the militia again to force them out. The federal government applied diplomatic pressure, and on July 29, 1829, the Potawatomi, Ottawa, and Ojibwe ceded 3,000 square miles (7,800 km^{2}) of northern land to the State of Illinois; the Winnebago made a cession in August.

== Later life ==
Under the 1818 constitution, governors were limited to a single term. When Edwards' ended on December 6, 1830, he returned to private life. He ran for the U.S. House of Representatives in 1832 and lost. Edwards devoted himself to charitable medical work in Belleville, giving free care to local residents. A cholera epidemic came through the area in 1833, carried by Winfield Scott's troops during the Black Hawk War. Edwards stayed in the town to care for his patients and caught the disease, dying on July 20. He was interred in Belleville, but was later moved to Springfield's Oak Ridge Cemetery.

== Family ==
His brother was Cyrus Edwards who was a lawyer and Illinois state legislator.

Three of Edwards' sons and one son-in-law followed him into politics. Ninian Wirt Edwards (1809–1889), named for his father and his father's childhood tutor William Wirt, served as Illinois Attorney General, in the General Assembly, and as Illinois' first Superintendent of Public Instruction. He was married to Elizabeth Porter Todd, a sister of Mary Todd Lincoln. Their daughter Julia Cook Edwards married Edward Lewis Baker, editor of the Illinois State Journal and son of Congressman David Jewett Baker.

Another son, Albert Gallatin Edwards (1812–1892), was an assistant secretary of the U.S. Treasury under President Abraham Lincoln. In 1887 he founded the brokerage firm A. G. Edwards in Saint Louis, Missouri. A third son, Benjamin S. Edwards (1818–1886), established a successful law practice in Springfield, Illinois and served as a judge in Illinois' Thirteenth Circuit. Ninian Edwards' daughter, Julia Edwards Cook, married Congressman Daniel Pope Cook. Their son, John Pope Cook, was a mayor of Springfield and a general in the Union Army during the American Civil War.

== Legacy ==
Edwards County, Illinois was named for him, as is the St. Louis, Missouri Metro-East area city of Edwardsville, Illinois. Both were named for him during his time as territorial governor. The territorial legislature named Edwards County, while Edwardsville was named by its founder, Thomas Kirkpatrick. The Edwards Trace, pioneer Central Illinois trail, was named for Ninian Edwards and his War of 1812 campaign. Since the summer of 2020, Edwardsville community members have been calling for the removal of Ninian Edwards' statue and the renaming of the Ninian Edwards Plaza in Edwardsville, Illinois, due to Edwards' racist legacy. That same year the City Council unanimously changed the plaza's name where the statue is located from Ninian Edwards Plaza to City Plaza. In the summer of 2021, the City removed the pedestal that Ninian Edwards statue was on.

U.S. Senate
Preceded by None	U.S. senator (Class 3) from Illinois; 1818–1824; Served alongside: Jesse B. Thomas	Succeeded by John McLean
Political offices
New creation Formation of Illinois Territory	Governor of Illinois Territory; 1809–1818	Succeeded by Shadrach Bond as Governor of Illinois
Preceded by Edward Coles	Governor of Illinois; 1826–1830	Succeeded by John Reynolds
