= Golconda, Illinois =

- City
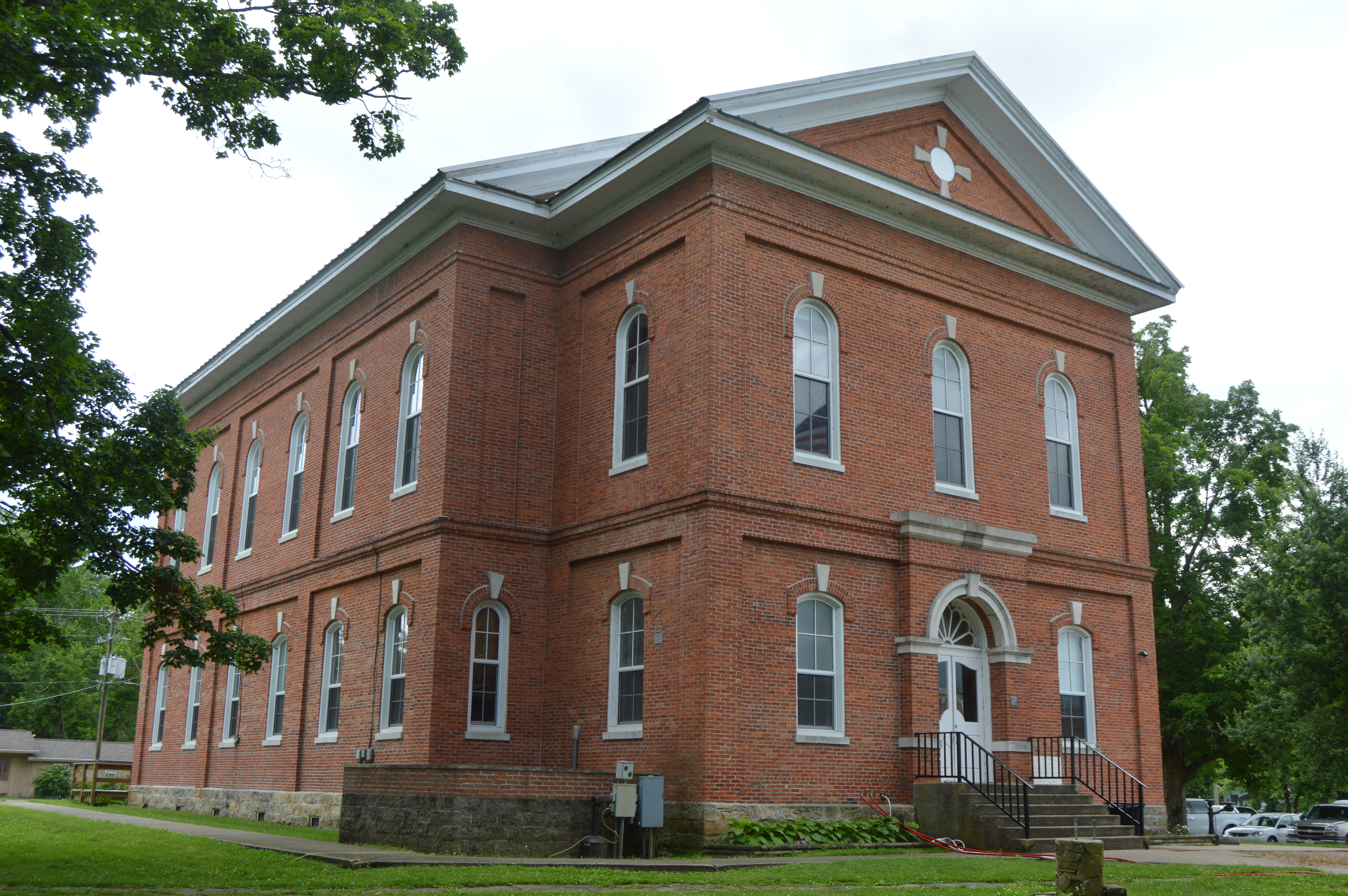
- Pope County Courthouse
- Interactive map of Golconda, Illinois
- Location within Illinois Location within the United States
- Coordinates: 37°21′50″N 88°29′12″W
- Country: United States
- State: Illinois
- County: Pope

Area
  - Total: 0.54 sq mi (1.41 km^{2})
  - Land: 0.51 sq mi (1.32 km^{2})
  - Water: 0.035 sq mi (0.09 km^{2})
- Elevation: 430 ft (130 m)

Population (2020)
  - Total: 630
  - Density: 1,235.9/sq mi (477.19/km^{2})
- Time zone: UTC-6 (CST)
  - Summer (DST): UTC-5 (CDT)
- ZIP code: 62938
- Area code: 618
- FIPS code: 17-30133
- GNIS feature ID: 2394922

Golconda is a city in and the county seat of Pope County, Illinois, United States, located along the Ohio River. The population was 630 at the 2020 census. Most of the city is part of the Golconda Historic District.

== History ==
The city is named after Golconda in Hyderabad, India, famed in the 19th century for its diamond mines. Golconda was the first permanent settlement in Pope County in 1798, and a ferry point across the Ohio River that was sometimes called Lusk's Ferry was established around that time. The town was named Sarahsville upon the organization of Pope County in 1816, but changed its name to Golconda on January 24, 1817, after the ancient city of Golkonda in India. In 1840, the Buel House, a single-family home currently owned by the Illinois Historic Preservation Agency, was built. Among the many historic buildings built in the latter half of the 19th century is the First Presbyterian Church (built in 1869). It is the oldest continuous Presbyterian congregation in Illinois. The church was organized in 1819.

=== Trail of Tears ===
Some 13,000 Cherokees, led by Chief Bear Paw, crossed the Ohio River at Golconda by ferry as part of the infamous "Trail of Tears" to Oklahoma. Because of the threat of disease, the Native Americans were not allowed to go into any towns or villages along the way; often this meant traveling much farther to go around them. After crossing Tennessee and Kentucky, they arrived at the Ohio River across from Golconda about the 3rd of December 1838. The starving Indians were charged a dollar a head (equal to $30 today) to cross the river on "Carpenter's Ferry", which typically charged twelve cents ($4 today). They were not allowed passage until the ferry had serviced all others wishing to cross and were forced to take shelter under "Mantle Rock", a bluff on the Kentucky side, until "Mr. Carpenter had nothing better to do". Many died huddled together at Mantle Rock waiting to cross. Several Cherokee were also murdered by locals. Many of the Cherokee were rescued and sheltered by the Carpenter family, one of the founding leaders of Golconda. The killers filed a lawsuit against the U.S. Government through the courthouse in Vienna, suing the government for $35 a head (equal to $1,100 today) to bury the murdered Cherokee.

== Geography ==
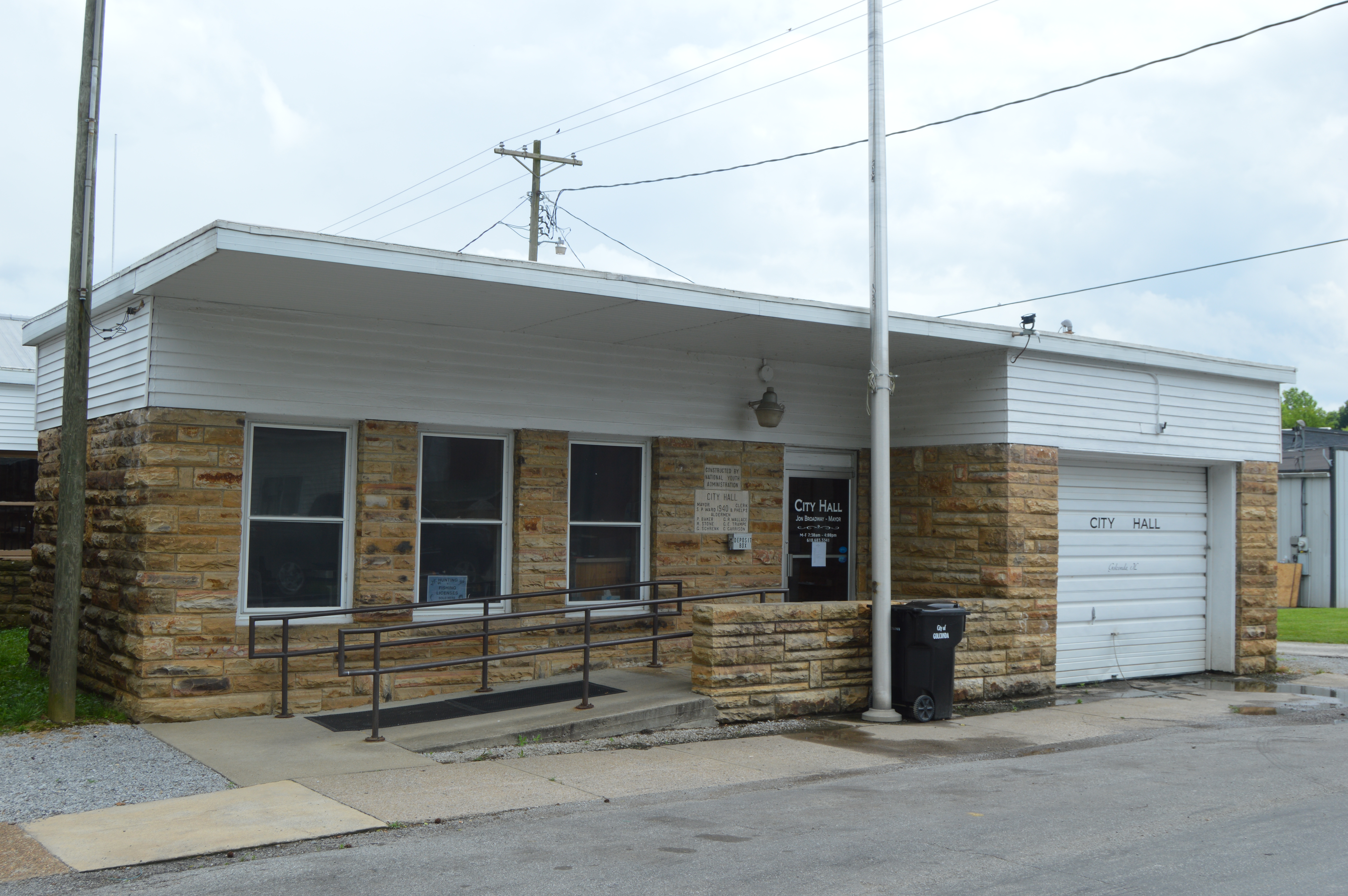
Golconda City Hall

According to the 2010 census, Golconda has a total area of 0.503 square miles (1.30 km^{2}), of which 0.49 square miles (1.27 km^{2}) (or 97.42%) is land and 0.013 square miles (0.03 km^{2}) (or 2.58%) is water.

== Demographics ==
Historical population
| Census | Pop. | Note | %± |
|---|---|---|---|
| 1860 | 404 | | — |
| 1870 | 858 | | 112.4% |
| 1880 | 1,000 | | 16.6% |
| 1890 | 1,174 | | 17.4% |
| 1900 | 1,140 | | −2.9% |
| 1910 | 1,088 | | −4.6% |
| 1920 | 1,242 | | 14.2% |
| 1930 | 1,184 | | −4.7% |
| 1940 | 1,301 | | 9.9% |
| 1950 | 1,066 | | −18.1% |
| 1960 | 864 | | −18.9% |
| 1970 | 922 | | 6.7% |
| 1980 | 960 | | 4.1% |
| 1990 | 823 | | −14.3% |
| 2000 | 726 | | −11.8% |
| 2010 | 668 | | −8.0% |
| 2020 | 630 | | −5.7% |
U.S. Decennial Census

As of the census of 2000, there were 726 people, 330 households, and 163 families residing in the city. The population density was 1,287.0 inhabitants per square mile (496.9/km^{2}). There were 418 housing units at an average density of 741.0 per square mile (286.1/km^{2}). The racial makeup of the city was 95.45% White, 0.96% African American, 0.41% Native American, 0.28% Asian, 0.55% from other races, and 2.34% from two or more races. Hispanic or Latino of any race were 0.41% of the population.

There were 330 households, out of which 22.4% had children under the age of 18 living with them, 34.2% were married couples living together, 13.0% had a female householder with no husband present, and 50.6% were non-families. 48.5% of all households were made up of individuals, and 27.3% had someone living alone who was 65 years of age or older. The average household size was 1.98 and the average family size was 2.86.

In the city the population was spread out, with 20.4% under the age of 18, 6.6% from 18 to 24, 22.7% from 25 to 44, 21.2% from 45 to 64, and 29.1% who were 65 years of age or older. The median age was 45 years. For every 100 females, there were 77.5 males. For every 100 females age 18 and over, there were 72.0 males.

The median income for a household in the city was $19,000, and the median income for a family was $34,375. Males had a median income of $31,250 versus $16,146 for females. The per capita income for the city was $14,698. About 18.3% of families and 25.0% of the population were below the poverty line, including 43.1% of those under age 18 and 18.4% of those age 65 or over.

== Notable people ==
- James Lusk Alcorn, (1816–1894), senator and 28th governor of Mississippi
- John R. Hodge, (1893–1963), military governor of South Korea, commanding general of the U.S. Third Army
- Mason Ramsey, (born 2006), star of viral video, "Walmart Kid Singing", and country singer
- Green B. Raum, (1829–1909), Union general during the Civil War, congressman, and head of the Internal Revenue Service
- James A. Rose, (1850–1912), Illinois Secretary of State

== In Literature ==
In "Walking the Trail", a 1991 book by Jerry Ellis, the author describes his visit to Golconda during his 900-mile walk retracing of the Trail of Tears in reverse.
In the book by Harlan Hubbard, Shantyboat - A River Way of Life, the author visits Golconda on a Saturday morning in the late 1940s, calling it a “cheerful place”.

== See also ==
- List of cities and towns along the Ohio River
- Dixon Springs State Park
- Shawnee National Forest
