= Lincoln-Herndon Law Offices State Historic Site =

- Lincoln-Herndon Law Offices
- U.S. Historic district – Contributing property
- Illinois State Historic Site
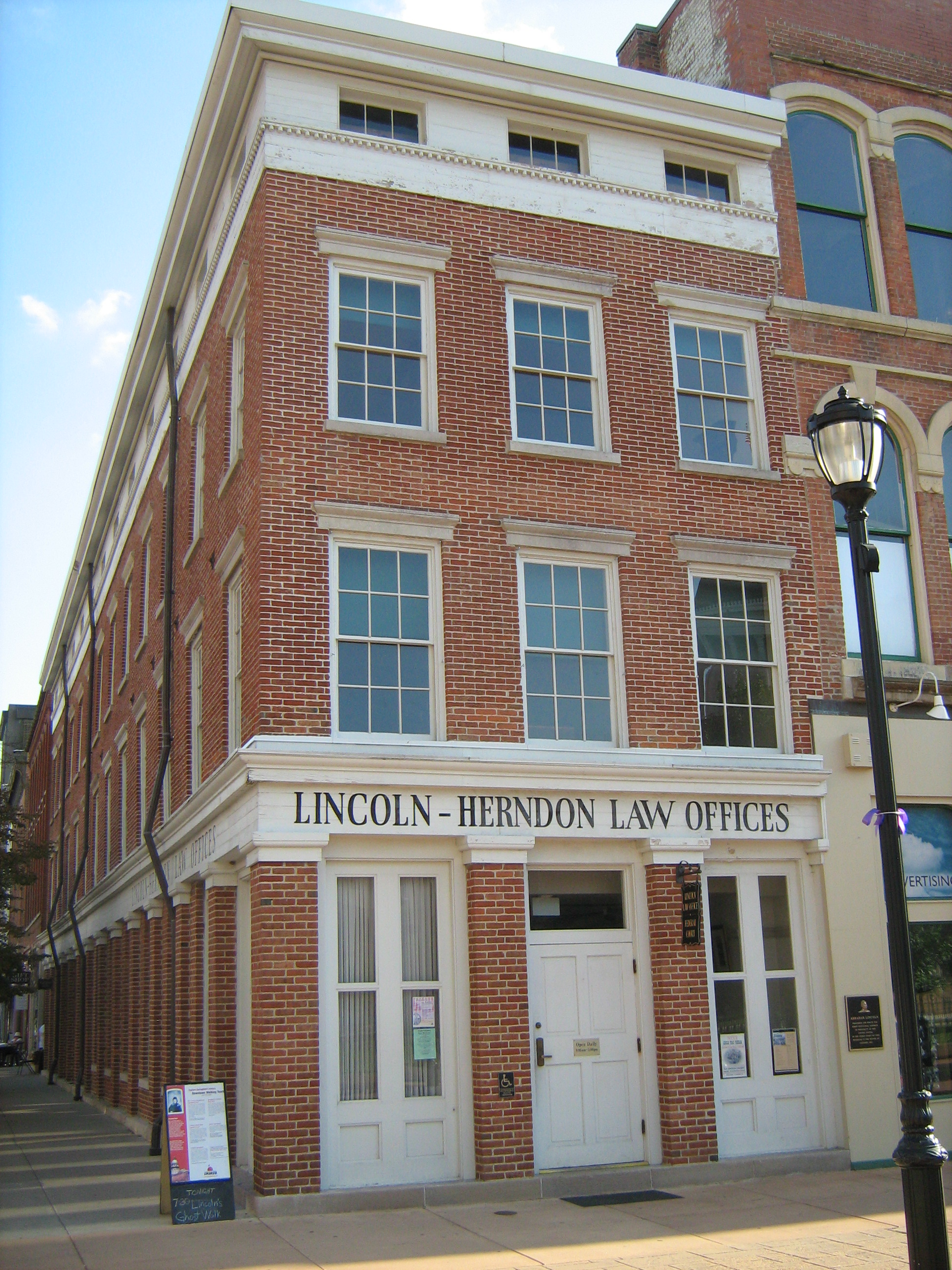
- Lincoln-Herndon Law Offices State Historic Site
- Location: Springfield, Illinois
- Coordinates: 39°48′1″N 89°38′53″W
- Built: 1822
- Architect: Multiple
- Part of: Central Springfield Historic District (ID78001187)
- Added to NRHP: August 29, 1978

The Lincoln-Herndon Law Offices State Historic Site is a historic brick building built in 1841 in the U.S. state of Illinois. It is located at 6th and Adams Streets in Springfield, Illinois. The law office has been restored and is operated by the Illinois Historic Preservation Agency as a state historic site.

The office building is a surviving portion of what was the Tinsley Block, a brick structure built by local developer Seth M. Tinsley in 1840–1841 to provide office space for professionals working in the newly chosen state capital city. The Illinois General Assembly had moved the capital from Vandalia, Illinois, to Springfield in late 1839, and local workers had begun to build a new limestone state house, now the Old State Capitol State Historic Site, on the parcel of land just north of the Tinsley Block.

Lawyer Abraham Lincoln and his partner Stephen T. Logan moved their partnership law offices to a third-floor office in the Tinsley Block in 1843. The Illinois Supreme Court, where the partners often pleaded cases, met in the State Capitol across the street, and the U.S. District Court rented space on the Tinsley Block's second floor.

The firm of Logan & Lincoln broke up in 1844. Lincoln continued to practice law in the Tinsley Block office and accepted a younger lawyer, William H. Herndon, as his junior partner. The firm of Lincoln and Herndon practiced from the Tinsley Block office from 1844 until about 1852.

== Lincoln's law work ==
The casual visitor to the Lincoln & Herndon office in 1844–52 might not always have run into the firm's senior partner. Lincoln's duties often demanded that he ride the judicial circuit of counties in central Illinois, trying cases in more than one dozen county courthouses. In addition, Lincoln served one term in the U.S. House of Representatives from 1847 to 1849.

== The law office today ==
The Lincoln & Herndon firm moved from the Tinsley Block to a new office (since demolished) on the west side of the Old State Capitol square about 1852. In 1872 part of the building was torn down, but the section that had contained Lincoln's law office was preserved. After the building had undergone many further changes, in 1985 it became a state-owned historic site managed by the Illinois Historic Preservation Agency (IHPA). The IHPA has since restored the surviving portion of the Tinsley Block to resemble its operations in the 1840s, with the federal court and the Lincoln and Herndon law office both operating within the building.
