= Lester E. Holt =

American pioneer aviator

- Born: August 26, 1889; Los Angeles, California
- Died: June 29, 1918 (aged 28); Dayton, Ohio
- Resting place: Oak Ridge Cemetery, Springfield, Illinois
- Occupations: pilot, instructor
- Years active: 1910–1918

Lester E. Holt (1889 – 1918) was an American pioneer aviator and later an Army instructor. He trained in the Curtiss Model D pusher type of plane.

== Death ==
In 1918 Holt was an Army flight instructor. He had been in the Army for four years. On June 30 at Dayton, Ohio, while flight testing an airplane, he crashed from a height of 1,200 feet. His body was crushed by the plane's engine.
