= Central Springfield Historic District =

Historic district in Illinois, United States

- U.S. National Register of Historic Places
- U.S. Historic district
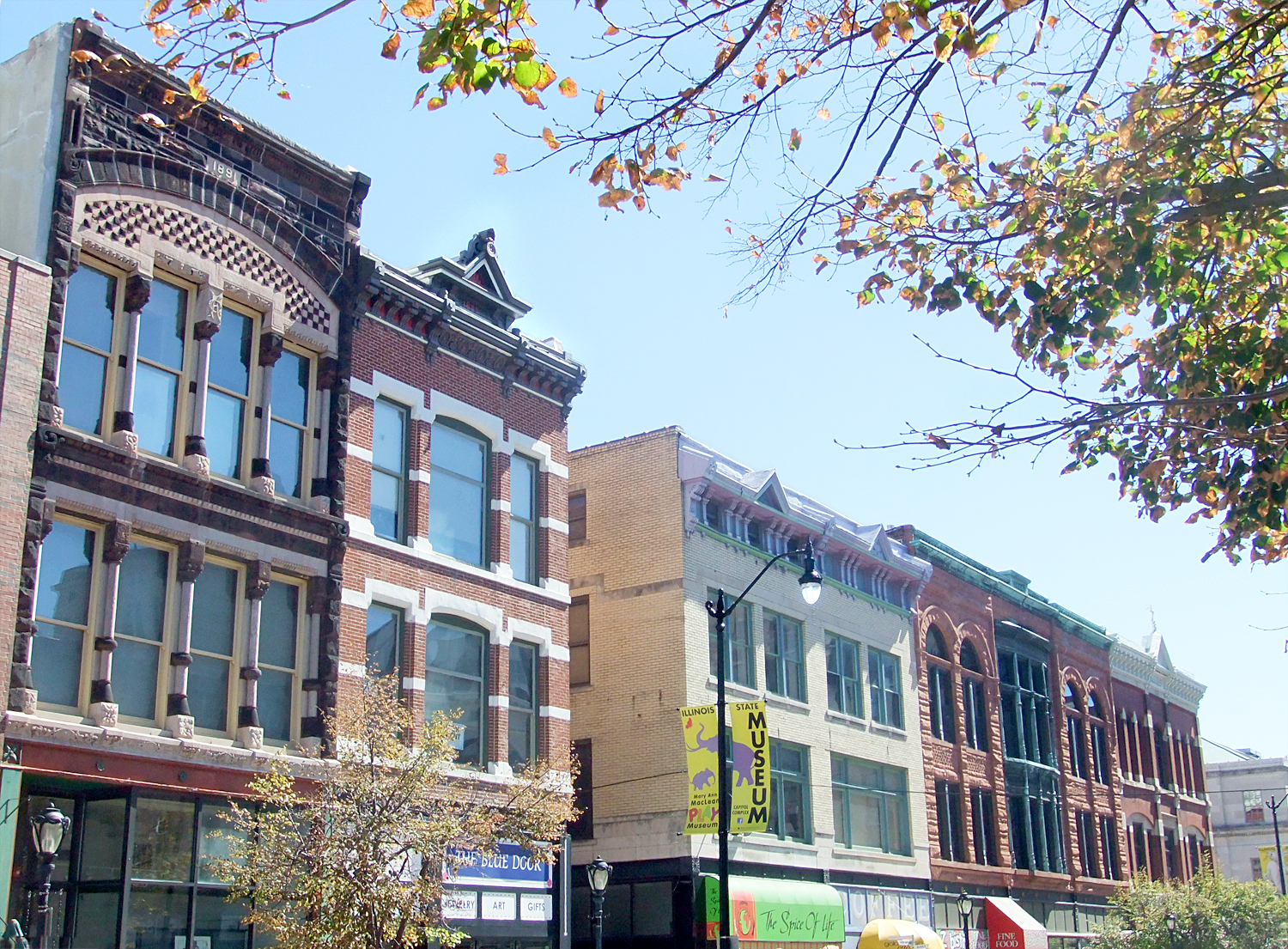

- Location within Illinois Location within the United States
- Location: Roughly bounded by 14th, 7th, Jefferson, and Washington Sts.; also 6th St. from Capitol to Monroe St.; also roughly Jefferson, Jackson, 2nd & 7th Sts., Springfield, Illinois
- Coordinates: 39°48′1″N 89°38′56″W
- NRHP reference No.: 78001187 (original); 86003184 (increase 1); 15000316 (increase 2)

Significant dates
- Added to NRHP: August 29, 1978
- Boundary increases: November 19, 1986; April 26, 2016

The Central Springfield Historic District is a 12-acre (4.9 ha) historic district in downtown Springfield. The district encompasses Springfield's oldest commercial district and is centered on the Old State Capitol. While the area was platted in 1822, only two buildings in the district predate the 1850s: the Old State Capitol and the Lincoln-Herndon Law Offices, both built in 1837. The majority of the district's buildings were constructed during Springfield's population boom in the 1860s and its subsequent growth in the latter half of the 19th century. These buildings included hotels, drug stores, groceries, clothing stores, and dry goods stores; some of the stores built in this period are still in operation. The businesses are also significant examples of 19th-century brick commercial architecture, including the Romanesque Pierick-Sommer Building and several works by prominent Springfield architects Helmle & Helmle.

The district was added to the National Register of Historic Places on August 29, 1978. A boundary extension in 1986 added seven more buildings to the district.
