= Spring Creek (Sangamon County, Illinois) =

Physical characteristics
- Source
  - location: Morgan County east of Jacksonville, Illinois
  - coordinates: 39°41′20″N 90°00′09″W
- Mouth
  - location: Confluence with the Sangamon north of Springfield, Illinois
  - coordinates: 39°51′35″N 89°38′30″W
  - elevation: 518 ft (158 m)

Basin features
- Progression: Spring Creek → Sangamon → Illinois → Mississippi → Gulf of Mexico
- GNIS ID: 418940

Spring Creek is a tributary of the Sangamon River in the U.S. state of Illinois. After rising in Morgan County, it flows into Sangamon County and discharges into the Sangamon River. In the lower part of its course, it flows through the city of Springfield, bordering Springfield's Oak Ridge Cemetery and the tomb of Abraham Lincoln.

The tributary can be fished from its banks, and is known for bullhead, carp, channel catfish, and sucker. The maximum depth of the creek is 2 feet (0.6 m) at mean waterflow.

According to the U.S. Geographic Names Information System (GNIS), there are 10 streams having the name Spring Creek in the state of Illinois.
