= Golconda Historic District =

Historic district in Illinois, United States

- U.S. National Register of Historic Places
- U.S. Historic district
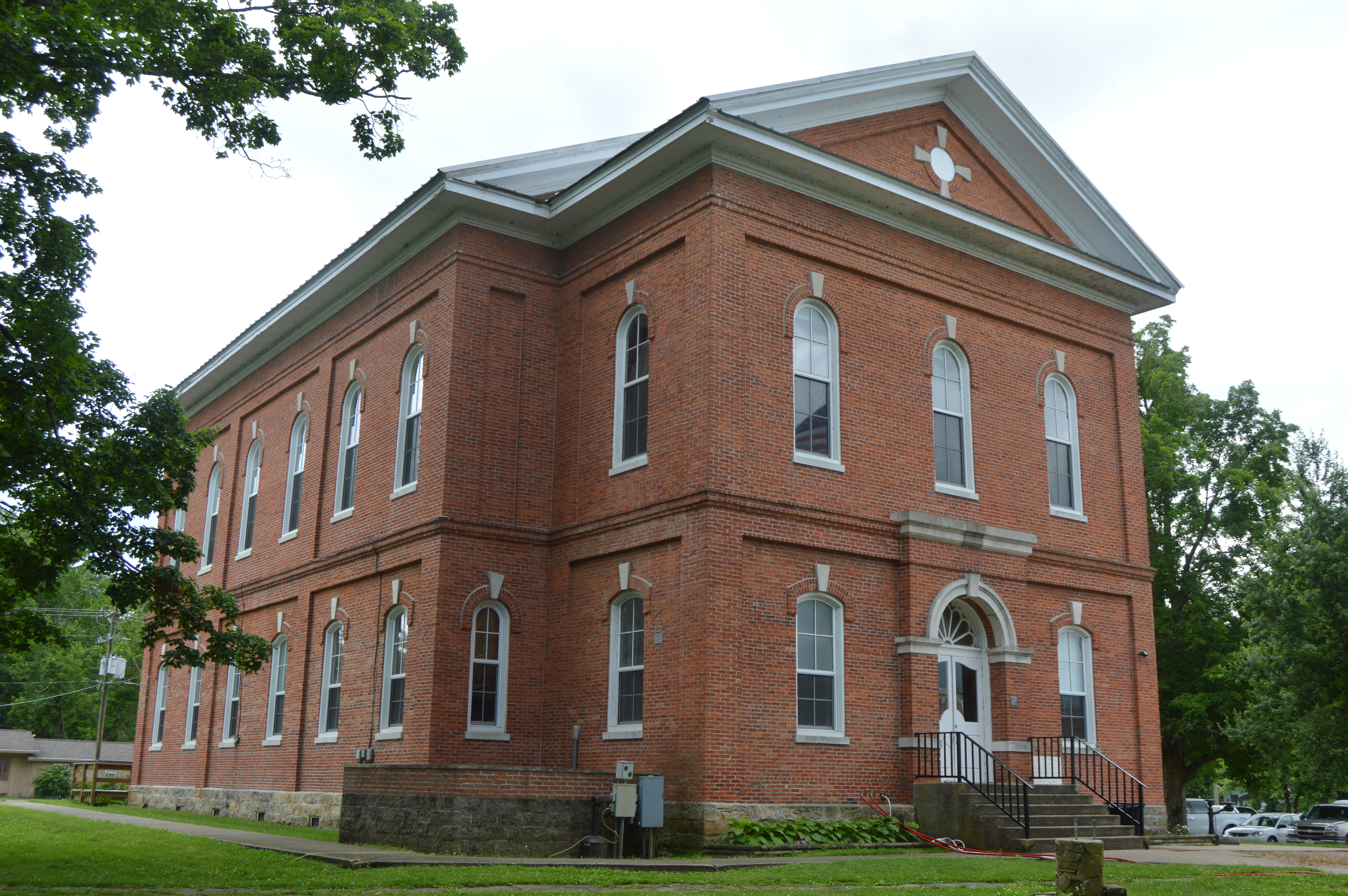
- Pope County Courthouse

- Location within Illinois Location within the United States
- Location: IL 146, Golconda, Illinois
- Coordinates: 37°22′0″N 88°29′12″W
- Area: 276 acres (112 ha)
- Built: Various
- NRHP reference No.: 76000726
- Added to NRHP: October 22, 1976

The Golconda Historic District is a designated historic district in the Pope County, Illinois city of Golconda, along the banks of the Ohio River. The district is listed on the National Register of Historic Places, one of only three sites in Pope County to be on the Register. The other sites are Millstone Bluff, a prehistoric Mississippian settlement in the Shawnee National Forest, and the Pope County portion of the Kincaid Mounds, a prehistoric city in the Ohio River floodplain. The historic district located along Illinois Route 146 and was added to the Register in 1976.

The Buel House, a historic home built in 1840 and currently owned by the Illinois Historic Preservation Agency, is included within the district.
