= Lincoln Tomb =

Historic site in Springfield, Illinois

Coordinates: 39°49′24″N 89°39′21″W

- Lincoln Tomb and War Memorials State Historic Site
- U.S. National Register of Historic Places
- U.S. National Historic Landmark
- Illinois State Historic Site
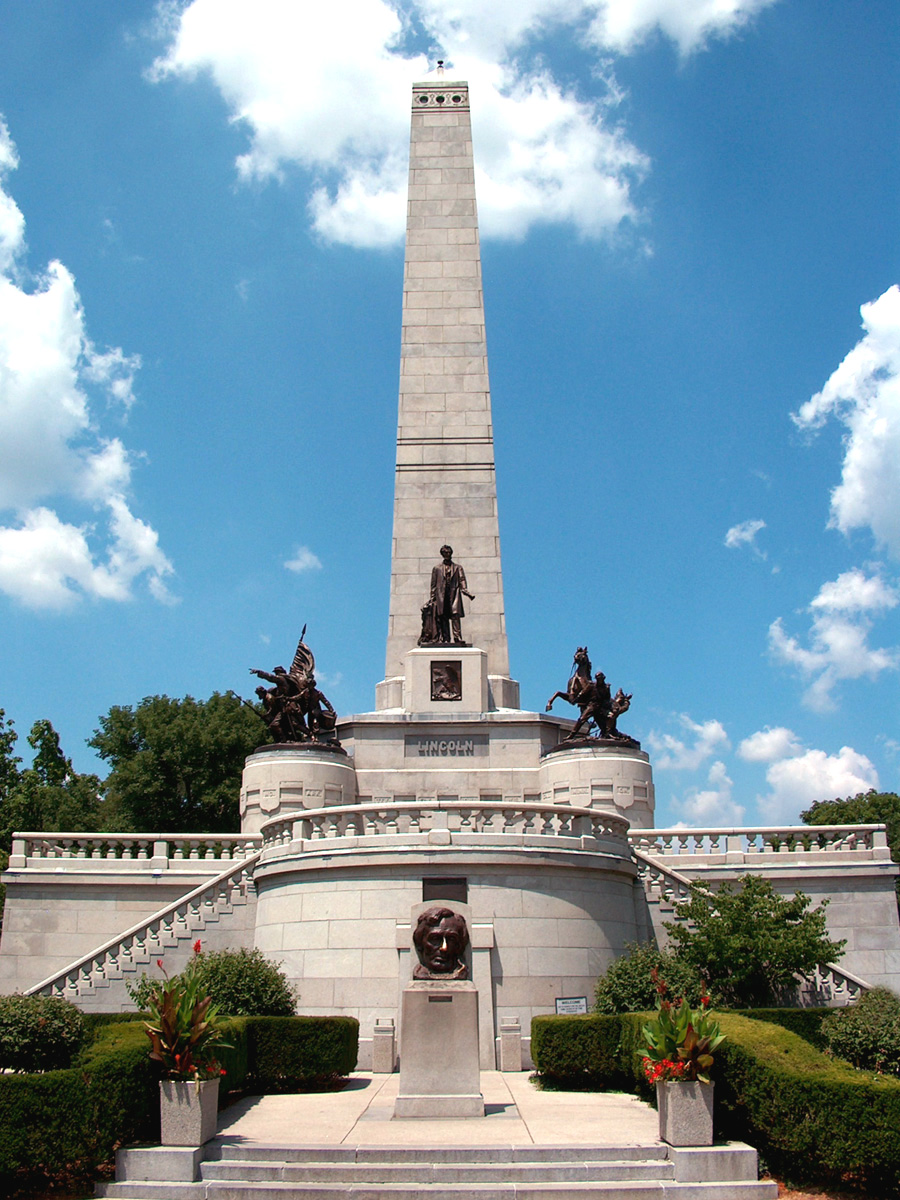
- Abraham Lincoln's tomb at Oak Ridge Cemetery in July 2005

- Location within Illinois Location within the United States
- Interactive map showing the location of Lincoln Tomb and War Memorials State Historic Site.
- Location: Oak Ridge Cemetery, Springfield, Illinois
- Built: 1868–1874
- Architect: Larkin Goldsmith Mead
- NRHP reference No.: 66000330

Significant dates
- Added to NRHP: October 15, 1966
- Designated NHL: December 19, 1960

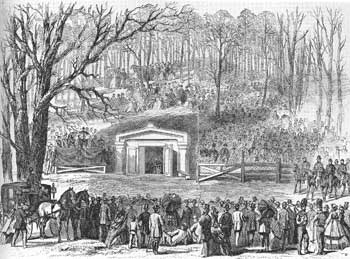
1865 illustration of Lincoln burial (Frank Leslie's Illustrated Newspaper)

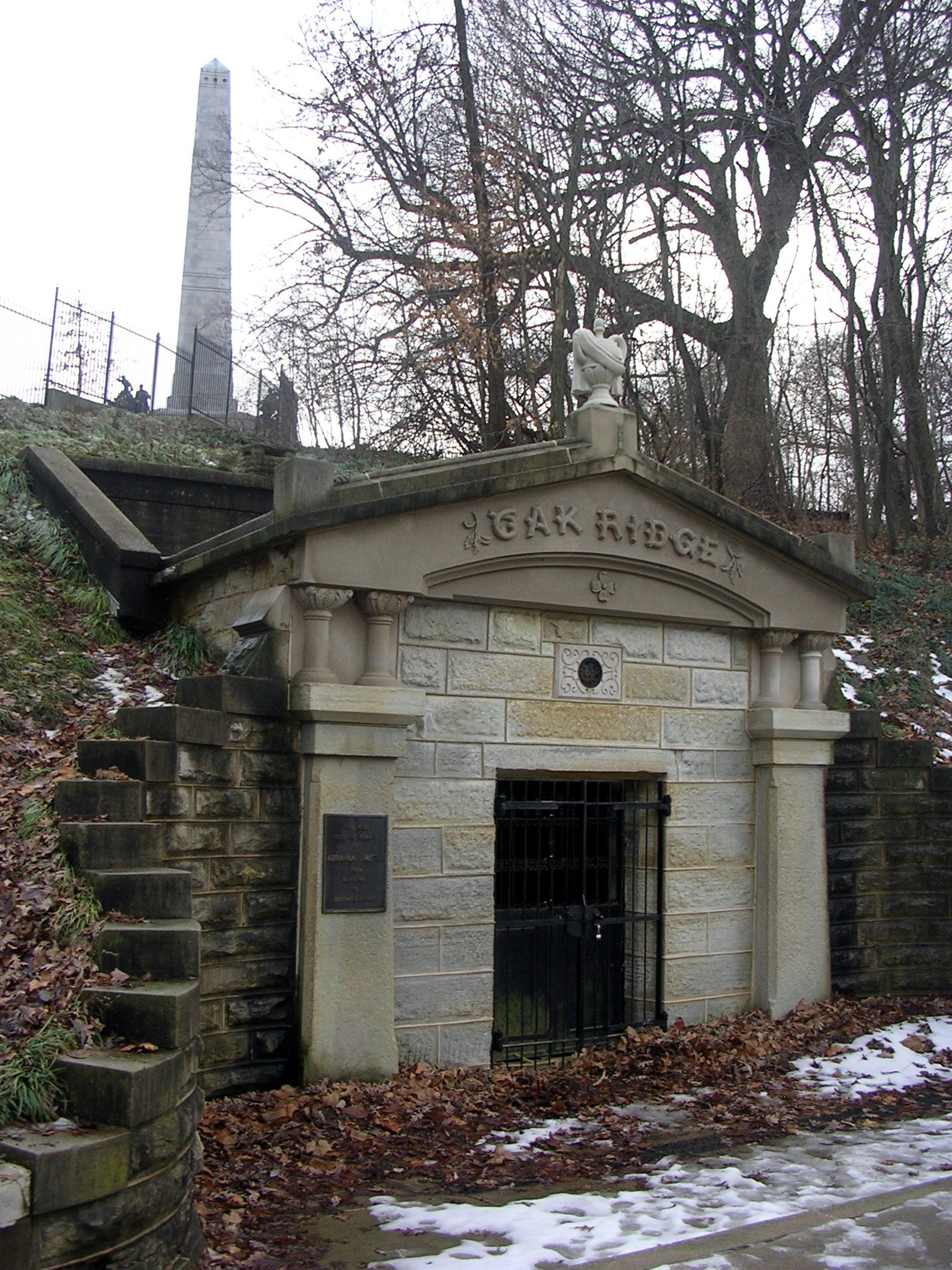
The receiving vault (foreground) and the tomb (background)

The Lincoln Tomb is the final resting place of Abraham Lincoln, the 16th president of the United States; his wife Mary Todd Lincoln; and three of their four sons: Edward, William, and Thomas. It is located in Oak Ridge Cemetery in Springfield, Illinois.

Constructed of granite, the tomb has a tall, story-and-a-half base in trapezoidal form, surmounted by an obelisk, with a semicircular receiving room entranceway on one end and a semicircular crypt or burial room opposite. On the exterior, four flights of balustraded stairs lead to a level terrace. The balustrade extends around the terrace to form a parapet, and there are several bronze statues, reliefs, and stone carvings located at the base of the obelisk. The obelisk rises 117 feet (36m) high.

A bronze recasting of Gutzon Borglum's head of Lincoln stands on a pedestal in front of the entrance way; Borglum's original marble bust is in the U.S. Capitol. Inside the tomb's ground level entrance is a rotunda with connecting hallways to the burial room. Marble is used throughout the interior, and several well-known, specially cast bronze statues of Lincoln are displayed in the entrance room and hallways. A stained glass window and flags adorn the crypt, which is centered around an inscribed red marble monument.

At the close of the ceremonies and events marking Lincoln's death, his body was placed in a nearby receiving tomb and later in the state tomb. The mausoleum is owned and administered by the State of Illinois as Lincoln Tomb State Historic Site. It was designated one of the first National Historic Landmarks in 1960, and thus became one of the first sites listed on the National Register of Historic Places in 1966, when that designation was created.

== History ==
On April 16, 1865, two days after President Abraham Lincoln was assassinated, a group of Springfield citizens formed the National Lincoln Monument Association and spearheaded a drive for funds to construct a memorial or tomb. Upon arrival of the funeral train on May 3, Lincoln lay in state in the Illinois State Capitol for one night. After funeral and burial services the next day, his coffin was placed in a receiving vault at Oak Ridge Cemetery, the site Mrs. Lincoln requested for burial. In December, her husband's remains were removed to a temporary vault not far from the proposed memorial site. In 1871, three years after laborers had begun constructing the tomb, the body of Lincoln and those of the three youngest of his sons were placed in crypts in the unfinished structure.

In 1874, upon completion of the memorial, which had been designed by Larkin Goldsmith Mead, Lincoln's remains were interred in a marble sarcophagus in the center of a chamber known as the "catacombs," or burial room. In 1876, however, after two Chicago criminals failed in an attempt to steal Lincoln's body and hold it for ransom, the National Lincoln Monument Association hid it in another part of the memorial, first under wood and other debris and then buried in the ground within the tomb. When Mrs. Lincoln died in 1882, her remains were placed with those of Lincoln, but in 1887 both bodies were reburied in a brick vault beneath the floor of the burial room.

By 1895, the year the State acquired the memorial, it had fallen into disrepair. During a rebuilding and restoration program from 1899 to 1901, all five caskets were moved to a nearby subterranean vault. Following completion of the restoration, State officials returned them to the burial room and placed that of Lincoln in the sarcophagus it had occupied in 1874–76. Within a few months, however, at the request of Robert Todd Lincoln, the President's only surviving son, Lincoln's remains were moved to their final resting place – a concrete vault 10 feet (3.0 m) below the surface of the burial room. In 1930–31 the State reconstructed the interior of the memorial in an Art Deco style. Rededicated in the later year by President Herbert Hoover, it has undergone little change since that time. The Lincoln Tomb was designated a National Historic Landmark in 1960.

== Design and layout ==
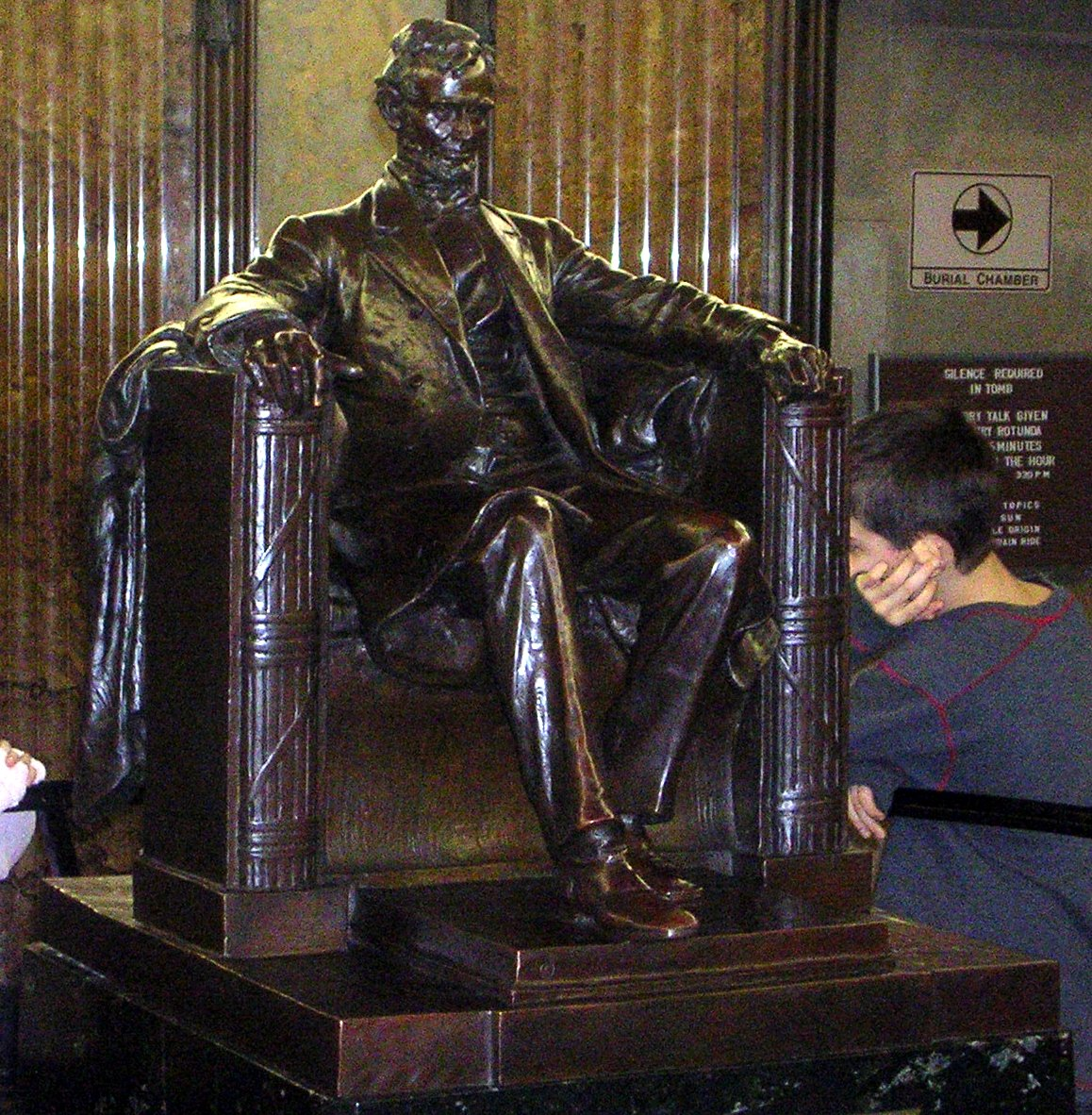
The bronze prototype casting by Daniel Chester French of his 1920 sculpture in the Lincoln Memorial is in the receiving rotunda of Lincoln's Tomb. Several specially cast well-known Lincoln sculptures line passageways of the crypt, including one of Abraham Lincoln: The Man

The tomb is in the center of a 12½ acre (51,000 m^{2}) plot. Constructed of granite from Biddeford, Maine, dressed at Quincy, Massachusetts, it has a rectangular base surmounted by a 117-foot (36 m)-high obelisk and a semicircular entranceway. A bronze reproduction by sculptor Gutzon Borglum of his head of Lincoln in the U.S. Capitol rests on a pedestal in front of the entranceway. Four flights of balustraded stairs—two flanking the entrance at the front and two at the rear—lead to a level terrace. The balustrade extends around the terrace to form a parapet. Originally open to the public, the terrace has since been closed due to safety concerns.

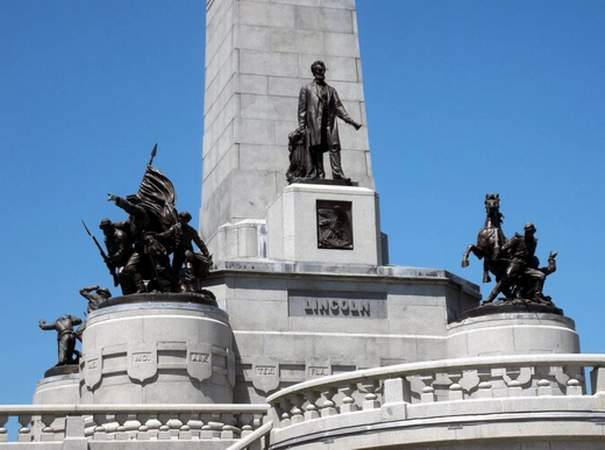
Infantry and Cavalry statues at the corners of the obelisk.

In the center of the terrace, a large and ornate base supports the obelisk. On the walls of the base are 40 hewn stones, cut to represent raised shields, 37 are engraved with the abbreviation of a State at the time the tomb was built. The remaining 3 are marked U, S, A. Each shield is connected to another by two raised bands, and thus the group forms an unbroken chain encircling the base. Four bronze statues adorn the corners of the latter. They represent the infantry, navy, artillery, and cavalry of the Civil War period. In front of the obelisk and above the entrance stands a full-length statue of Lincoln. The tomb's design architect and sculptor, Larkin G. Mead, designed and executed these carvings and statues.

The interior of the memorial, constructed of marble from Minnesota, Missouri, Massachusetts, Arkansas, Utah, Italy, Spain, France, and Belgium, contains a rotunda, a burial room, and connecting corridors. A down-scaled bronze prototype by Daniel Chester French of his 1920 statue in the Lincoln Memorial, in Washington, D.C., dominates the entrance foyer. The walls of the rotunda are decorated with 16 marble pilasters, which are separated by marble panels. The pilasters symbolize Lincoln and the 15 presidents who preceded him. The room also contains 36 bronze panels, one for each state at the time of Lincoln's death. The ceiling is of palladium leaf.

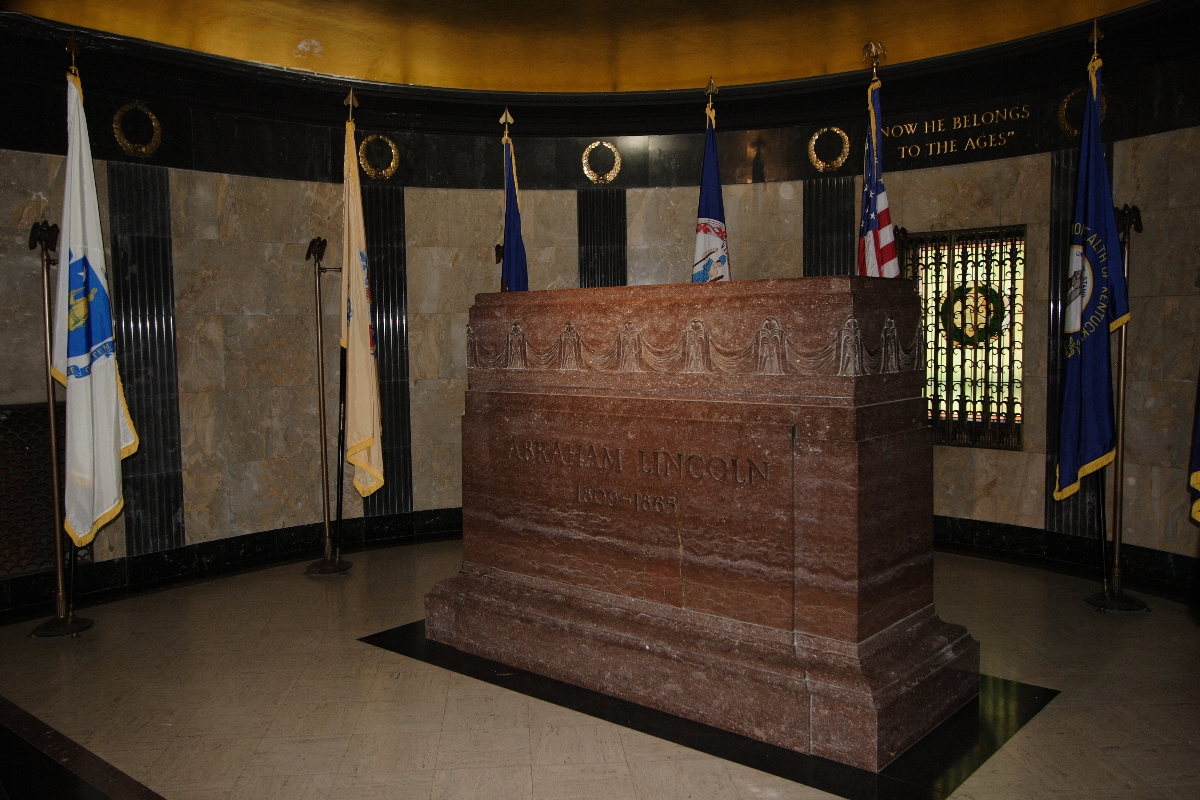
The Art Deco burial room, with red marble memorial monument

Corridors lead from the rotunda to the burial room at the rear of the memorial. Located in niches along the corridor walls are eight statues by prominent sculptors depicting various phases of Lincoln's life. Four bronze tablets on the walls are engraved with the Farewell Address, the Gettysburg Address, a portion of the Second Inaugural Address, and a biographical sketch. Large gold stars in sets of 12 at each corner of the memorial represent the 48 states in the Union at the time of its 1930 redecoration.

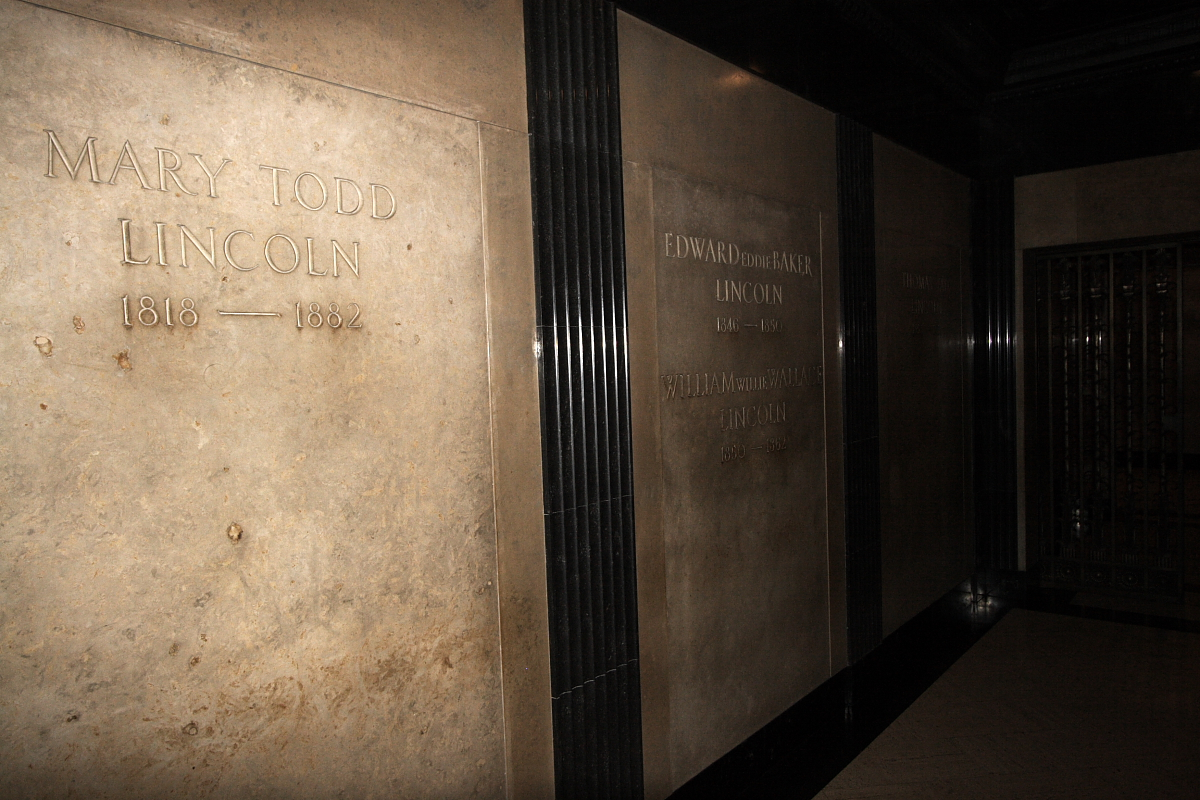
Mary Todd Lincoln's crypt in the Burial Room is next to those of her sons.

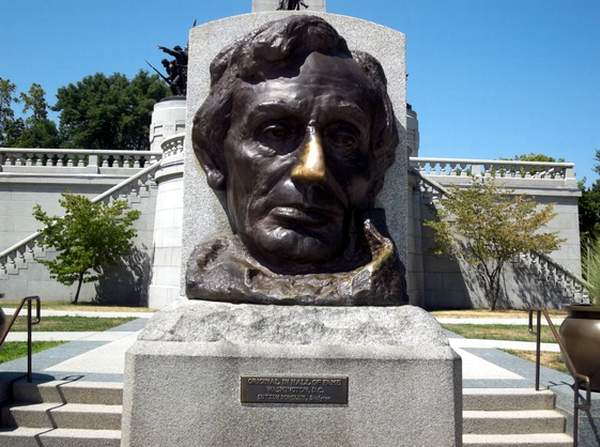
Gutzon Borglum's head of Lincoln. The nose remains shiny due to the tradition of rubbing Lincoln's nose for good luck.

The burial room features black and white marble walls and a ceiling of gold leaf. At its center stands the memorial monument, a 7-ton block of reddish marble inscribed with Lincoln's name and the years he lived. It marks the approximate location of the burial vault, which is 30 inches behind and 10 feet below. Nine flags are arranged in a semicircle around the cenotaph. Seven of them—the State flags of Massachusetts, New Jersey, Pennsylvania, Virginia, Kentucky, Indiana, and Illinois—commemorate the homes of Lincoln and his ancestors. The eighth and ninth are the U.S. flag and the Presidential flag. The inscription "Now he belongs to the ages," reputedly spoken by Secretary of War Edwin M. Stanton at the time of Lincoln's death, is inscribed in the wall above a stained glass window. Along the south wall of the burial room are four crypts containing the remains of Mrs. Lincoln and three of Lincoln's four sons, Edward, Willie, and Tad (the eldest, Robert Todd Lincoln, is buried at Arlington National Cemetery, alongside his wife and son).

The tomb was built with additional crypts for members of Lincoln's family in addition to the four spaces already used. However, as the remaining members of Lincoln's family chose to be buried elsewhere, the other crypts remain empty.

The original landscaping for the site was designed by William Saunders, a prominent landscape designer and federal employee who had previously designed Oak Ridge Cemetery and the Soldiers National Cemetery at Gettysburg where Lincoln had delivered his famous speech.

== Adjacent memorials ==
Also part of the site overseen by the State of Illinois, and a short distance from the tomb, several memorials have been erected:

- The World War II Illinois Veterans Memorial was dedicated in December 2004. This memorial honors the 987,000 Illinois men and women who served in World War II and the 22,000 who gave their lives. Its focal point is a white 22-ton concrete globe flanked on two sides by black granite walls. Stainless steel buttons on the globe identify major battles, and quotations from military leaders, and Presidents Franklin D. Roosevelt and Harry S. Truman are engraved on the wall.
- The Korean War Memorial honors 1,748 Illinoisans killed during the 1950–53 Korean War. This memorial was dedicated on June 16, 1996. The memorial consists of a twelve-foot-tall bronze bell, with a diameter of twelve feet, mounted on a granite base. At the circumference of the bell are four niches, each with a larger-than-life figure representing a branch of the armed services. Inscribed on the base are the names of Illinoisans killed in Korea. A carillon system in the Memorial plays brief musical programs at regular intervals.
- The Vietnam Veterans Memorial honors the almost 3,000 Illinoisans killed during the Vietnam War, and was dedicated in 1988. The memorial has a circular layout allowing visitors to enter the interior courtyard from any direction. The names of those killed or missing in action are on five granite slabs, each slab representing one of the branches of the United States Military.
- The World War I Sangamon County Veterans Memorial was originally erected in 2003 and was moved to Oak Ridge Cemetery in 2019. This memorial is dedicated to the 113 members of the armed forced from Sangamon County, Illinois who died during World War I.
- The Purple Heart Memorial was dedicated in 2016 and is located between the World War II and the Vietnam Veterans Memorials.
- The Gold Star Family Memorial Monument was dedicated in October of 2025 and stands as a "perpetual tribute to the sacrifice of our Fallen Service Members and the Gold Star Families and Relatives who loved them."

== See also ==
- List of National Historic Landmarks in Illinois
- National Register of Historic Places listings in Sangamon County, Illinois
- Presidential memorials in the United States
- List of burial places of presidents and vice presidents of the United States
