= Springfield Old Capitol Art Fair =

Festival held annually in Springfield, Illinois

- Genre: Art fair
- Frequency: Annually
- Inaugurated: 1962
- Most recent: May 17 – 18, 2025
- Previous event: May 18 – 19, 2024
- Next event: May 16 - 17, 2026
- Website: socaf.org

The Springfield Old Capitol Art Fair is a festival held annually during the third weekend of May on the grounds of the Old State Capitol State Historic Site in Springfield, Illinois. The festival features both tangible and performing art.

== Description ==
The Old Capitol Art Fair was first celebrated in 1962. It has been held continuously on the lawn of and in the streets surrounding Springfield's Old State Capitol, except when the historic 1837 building was being reconstructed in 1966-70. The fair is known for the Children's Tent, a Springfield innovation. It forms a cordoned-off wing of the Art Fair from which most adults (except approved supervisors) are barred. Items of craft art are offered for sale for a fixed price, affordable for most juveniles through high school age. Many young visitors to the Children's Tent learn for the first time what kinds of art they themselves like and want to buy.

In addition to two-and-three-dimensional artworks, the Art Fair offers a lineup of concert music and Illinois festival food. In 2024, the Fair was held on May 18-19.
