= Illinois Vietnam Veterans Memorial =

Coordinates: 39°49′11″N 89°39′45″W

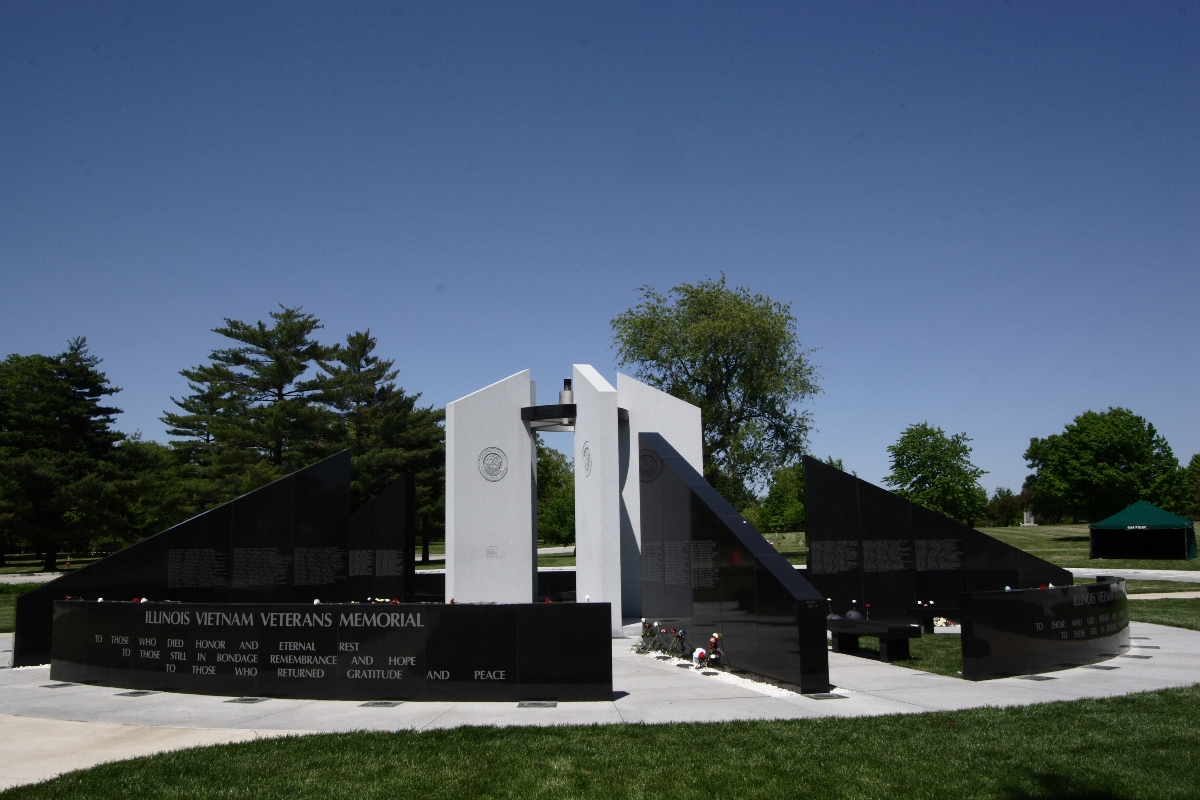

Illinois Vietnam Veterans Memorial honors the 2,970 Illinois residents who are listed as killed or listed as missing in action during the Vietnam War. Dedicated in 1988, the Memorial includes the names of the dead or missing carved in black granite walls that radiate from the central eternal flame. Supporting the flame are five vertical gray granite walls, each representing a branch of the armed services. A vigil and memorial service is held each year on the first full weekend in May and on Memorial Day, as well as the first Saturday in December.

The Memorial is maintained by the Illinois Historic Preservation Agency as a state historic site, and is located at Oak Ridge Cemetery in Springfield, Illinois.
