= Governor Horner State Memorial =

Coordinates: 41°57′39.9″N 87°41′53.6″W

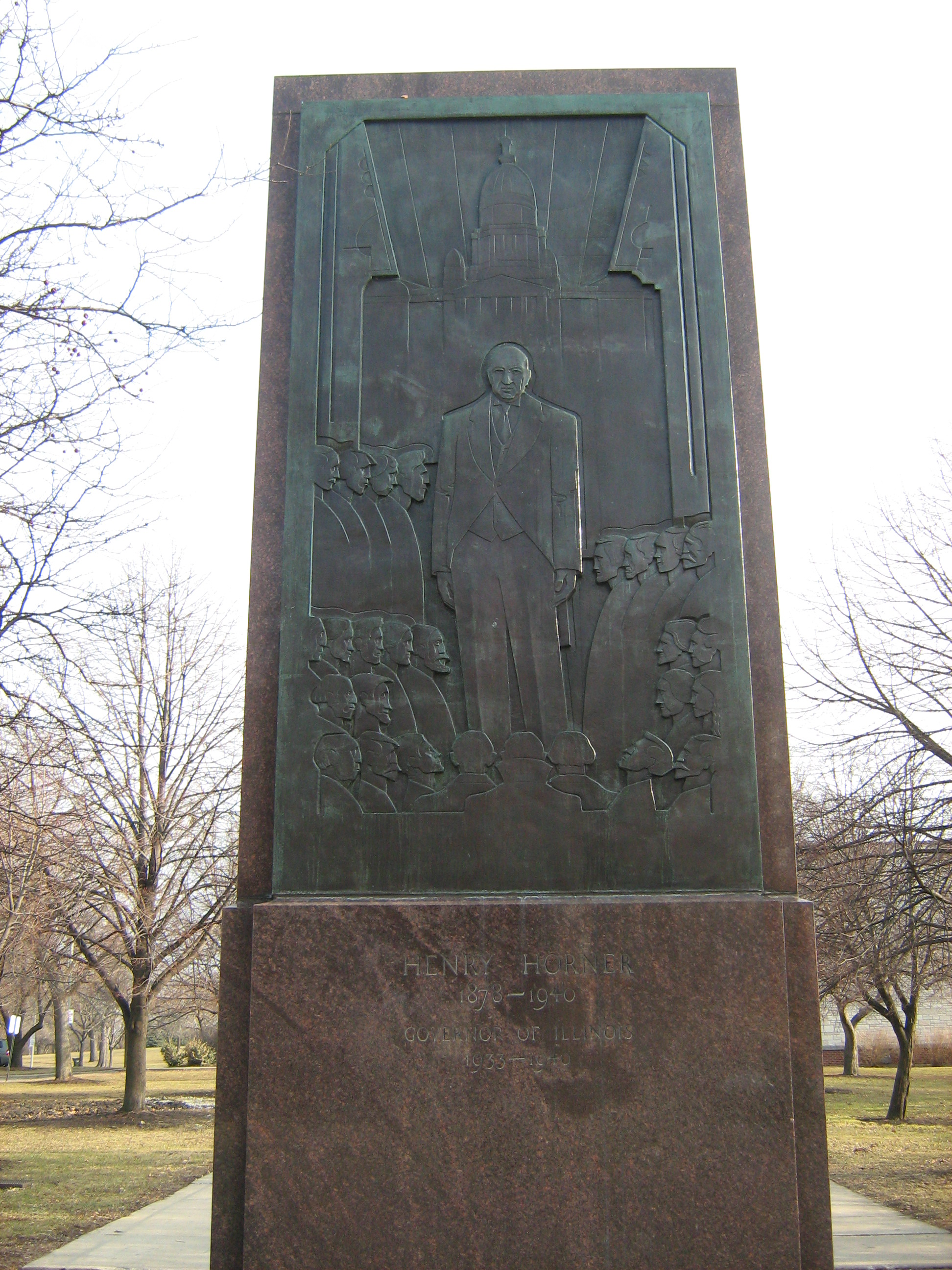
- Artist: John David Brcin
- Year: 1948
- Type: Granite Monument
- Location: Horner Park, Chicago

Governor Horner State Memorial is a granite monument dedicated to Henry Horner, the thirtieth governor of Illinois who served from 1933 to 1940. The memorial stands in Horner Park in Chicago, Illinois at the corner of Montrose Avenue and California Avenue. It is maintained by the Illinois Historic Preservation Agency as a state historic site. The monument was designed by John David Brcin in 1948. It features reliefs representing Horner during his years as probate judge and as governor. The monument was originally located in Grant Park but was moved in 1956 to its present site at Horner Park when the fieldhouse was opened.

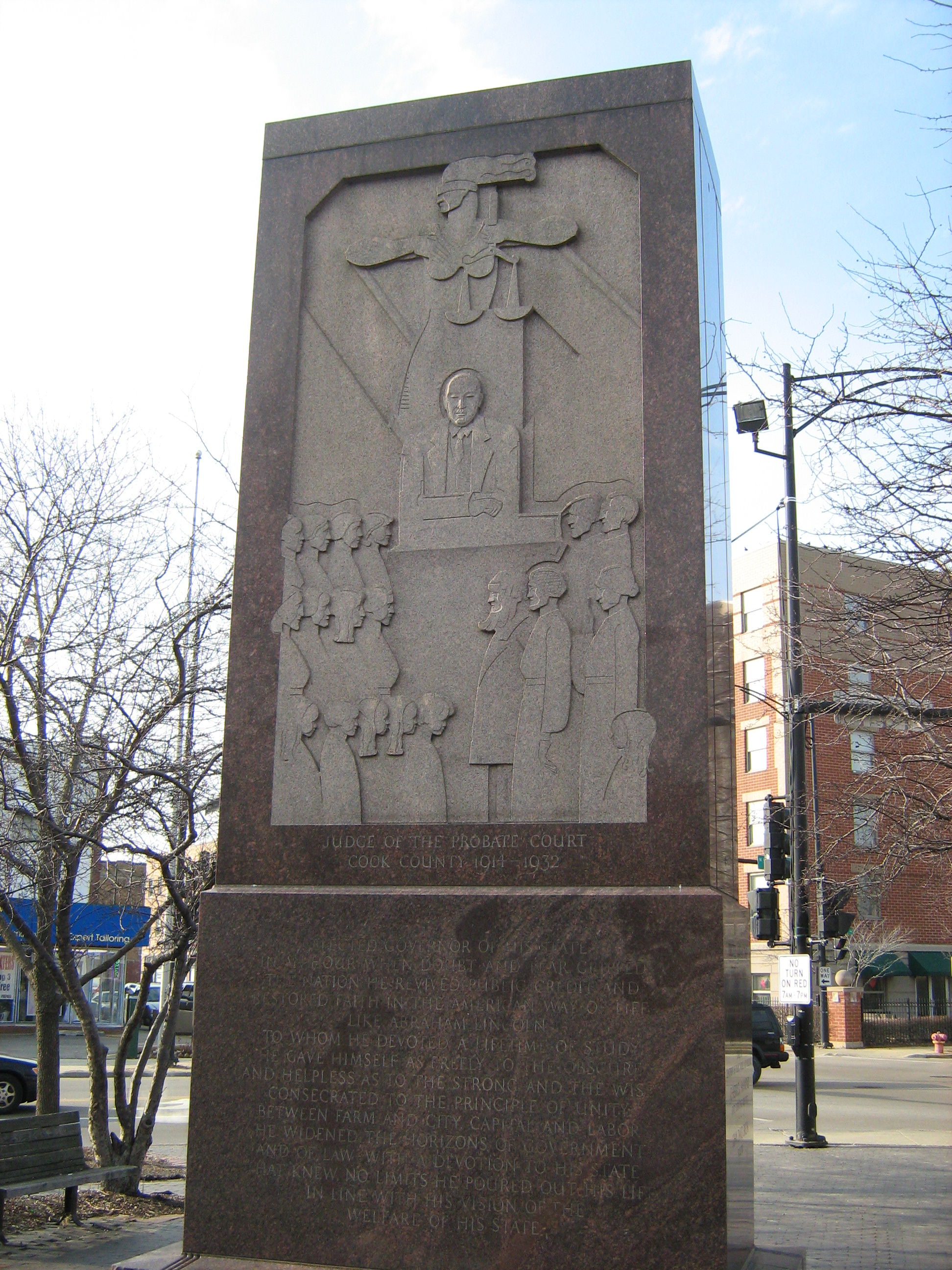
Back side of Governor Horner State Memorial Monument

== See also ==
- List of public art in Chicago
