= Buel House =

- U.S. Historic district – Contributing property
- Illinois State Historic Site
- Location within Illinois Location within the United States
- Location: Madison and Columbus Streets, Golconda, Illinois
- Coordinates: 37°21′51.5″N 88°29′4″W
- Part of: Golconda Historic District (ID76000726)
- Added to NRHP: October 22, 1976

The Buel House is a single-family house and historic site in Golconda, Illinois on the Ohio River. The house, built in 1840, is owned by the Illinois Historic Preservation Agency and is operated by the Pope County Historical Society.

== Description ==
The home's first owner, Alexander Buel, was a tanner of hides into dressed leather. At the time, there were substantial shipments of hides and leather up and down the Ohio River, with craftsmen such as Jesse Grant (father of Ulysses S. Grant) in the river leather trade. The house remained in the hands of the Buel family until 1986, and is preserved as an example of a working-class home's 146-year occupation by one family. The Buel family's period of residence included the years of the American Civil War.

A local legend claims that the Buel House was a site on the Trail of Tears; this is impossible, however, because the house was not built until 1840. It is fact that the Cherokee were forced to march through Golconda in 1838, and the deportees undoubtedly passed the house site.

The Buel House was listed on the National Register of Historic Places in 1976 as part of the Golconda Historic District. It is located at Madison and Columbus Streets, in central Golconda.
