= John David Brcin =

American sculptor and artist (1899–1983)

- Born: August 15, 1899
- Died: October 31, 1983 (aged 84)
- Occupation: Sculptor
- Spouse: Blanche Elizabeth Moore
- Parent(s): David Brcin and Milica (Kesich) Brcin

John David Brcin (Serbian: Јован Брчин; born Jovan Brčin; August 15, 1899 - October 31, 1983) was an American sculptor and artist.

== Background and education ==
Brcin was born into a Serb family in Gračac, then part of the Austro-Hungarian Empire (modern-day Croatia), to parents David and Milica Kesić Brčin as Jovan Brčin. His father died when he was two years old. After his father's death, Brcin was brought up by an uncle who was a carpenter and mason. As a child, Brcin helped him carve simple wooden objects during the winter months. He immigrated to the United States in 1913 to join an older brother who was working at a bank in Gary, Indiana.

In 1917, Brcin studied sculpture at Chicago's Art Institute, where he received a fellowship allowing him to pursue his studies for one year in Serbia, France and Italy. He obtained a Bachelor of Fine Arts from The Art Institute of Chicago and a Master of Arts from Ohio State University. Brcin became a member of the National Sculpture Society in 1935.

In Chicago, Brcin was based in the Tree Studio Building and Annexes artist colony, alongside other notable artists at that time including his tutor Albin Polasek.

He married Blanche Elizabeth Moore in 1923 and died in 1983 in Boulder, Colorado.

== Career ==
Brcin's style relied on traditional portraiture and streamlined designs, as well as sharply cut geometric details done in bas-relief. He received various public commissions throughout the United States and also taught at several art schools.

In 1929, Brcin became the official sculptor during the construction of the Joslyn Art Museum in Omaha, Nebraska. He carved the building's pink marble exterior panels, featuring figures of Native Americans and European settlers. He also sculpted the memorial tablet to George Joslyn, various column and pilaster capitals, and the rosette designs of several entrances. According to the Chicago Herald-Examiner, "Brcin's carvings are a new thing; they are full of dynamic thrust, a smooth sharp-edged symmetry which admirably interprets the spirit of an age governed by machinery." Brcin also designed the museum's "Sioux Warrior" statue which was only completed in 2009 using his original plaster prototype.

In 1933 Brcin's sculpture "Fantasy" was exhibited at the Century of Progress World's Fair, a centre of American Art Deco influence.

In 1948, Brcin produced the Governor Horner State Memorial, a granite monument located in Chicago, Illinois. The outdoor sculpture illustrates the career of Henry Horner, the 30th governor of Illinois. Originally erected in Grant Park, the memorial can now be found in Horner Park.

Brcin's 1952 large public monument to the early US Naval leader Stephen Decatur, in the City of Decatur, Illinois, Illinois, is notable for combining Brcin's skills in classical statuary as well as his streamline style. The monument includes a statue of Decatur set in front of a large, stone frieze with a two dimensional relief portraying a scene from Decatur's life.

In addition to commissioned work, Brcin was hired in 1922 to teach modeling and drawing at the Minneapolis School of Art. From 1923 to 1924, he headed the sculpture department at Milwaukee's Layton School of Art. He later taught modeling at Rockford College for two years starting in 1934.

== Portfolio ==
- Bust of Nikola Tesla.
- Bust of Bishop Nikolaj Velimirović.
- Head of Mark Twain (owned by the City of Chicago)
- Bust of Mark Twain for North Central College, Naperville, Illinois
- Caroline (owned by Witte Museum in San Antonio)
- Portrait bust of Judge Elbert H. Gary for the Commercial Club, Gary, Indiana
- Memorial tablet to Newton, Mann, 1st Unitarian Church of Omaha
- Rudulph Hering Medal for the American Society of Civil Engineers
- Memorial tablet to Benjamin Franklin Lounsbury, Washington Boulevard Hospital, Chicago
- Monument to Cyrus Hall McCormick, Washington and Lee University, Lexington, Virginia
- Stephen Decatur Monument, Decatur, Illinois
- Heroic portrait bust of Stephen Decatur for the United States Naval Academy, Annapolis

== Awards ==
- Bryant Lathrop traveling scholarship, The Art Institute of Chicago, 1920
- Certificate of merit, The Art Institute of Chicago, 1922
- Mistress John C. Shaffer prize, 1923
- William Mont Rose French memorial gold medal, The Art Institute of Chicago, 1926
- Catherine Barker Spaulding prize, Hoosier Salon, 1936
- Hickox prize, Museum of Fine Arts in Houston, 1936
- Municipal Art League portrait prize, 1945

== Exhibitions ==
During the 1920s, Brcin participated in several group exhibitions, as well as having a one-man show in Chicago which subsequently. traveled to the Brooks Memorial Gallery in Memphis, the Art Institute of Omaha, the Museum of Fine Arts in Houston, and the Witte Museum in San Antonio.

He later exhibited at New York's National Academy of Design, the Pennsylvania Academy of the Fine Arts, The Art Institute of Chicago, the Detroit Institute of Arts, The Museum of Fine Arts, Houston (MFAH), the Legion of Honor (museum), the Brooklyn Museum, the Albright–Knox Art Gallery in Buffalo, and the Milwaukee Institute of Art & Design.

His work is represented in permanent collections at the University of Illinois, Roosevelt University, and the Evansville Museum of Arts, History and Science located in Indiana.
