= Korean War Memorial (Illinois) =

Coordinates: 39°49′11″N 89°39′45″W

- Location: Oak Ridge Cemetery; Springfield, Illinois
- Material: Bronze, granite
- Dedicated date: June 1996
- Dedicated to: Illinois residents killed or MIA in Korean War

The Illinois Korean War State Memorial honors the 1,748 Illinois residents who are listed as killed or listed as missing in action during the Korean War. Dedicated in June 1996, the Memorial centers on the names of the dead or missing carved on slabs of granite. Mounted on the granite base with inscribed names is a twelve-foot-high bronze bell. The bell encloses a carillon system. The bell and base create four niches, each representing a branch of the Korean War-era armed services.

The carillon system plays brief music programs for visitors, and there is a dedicated parking area.
