= Pope County Courthouse (Illinois) =

Local government building in the United States

- U.S. Historic district – Contributing property
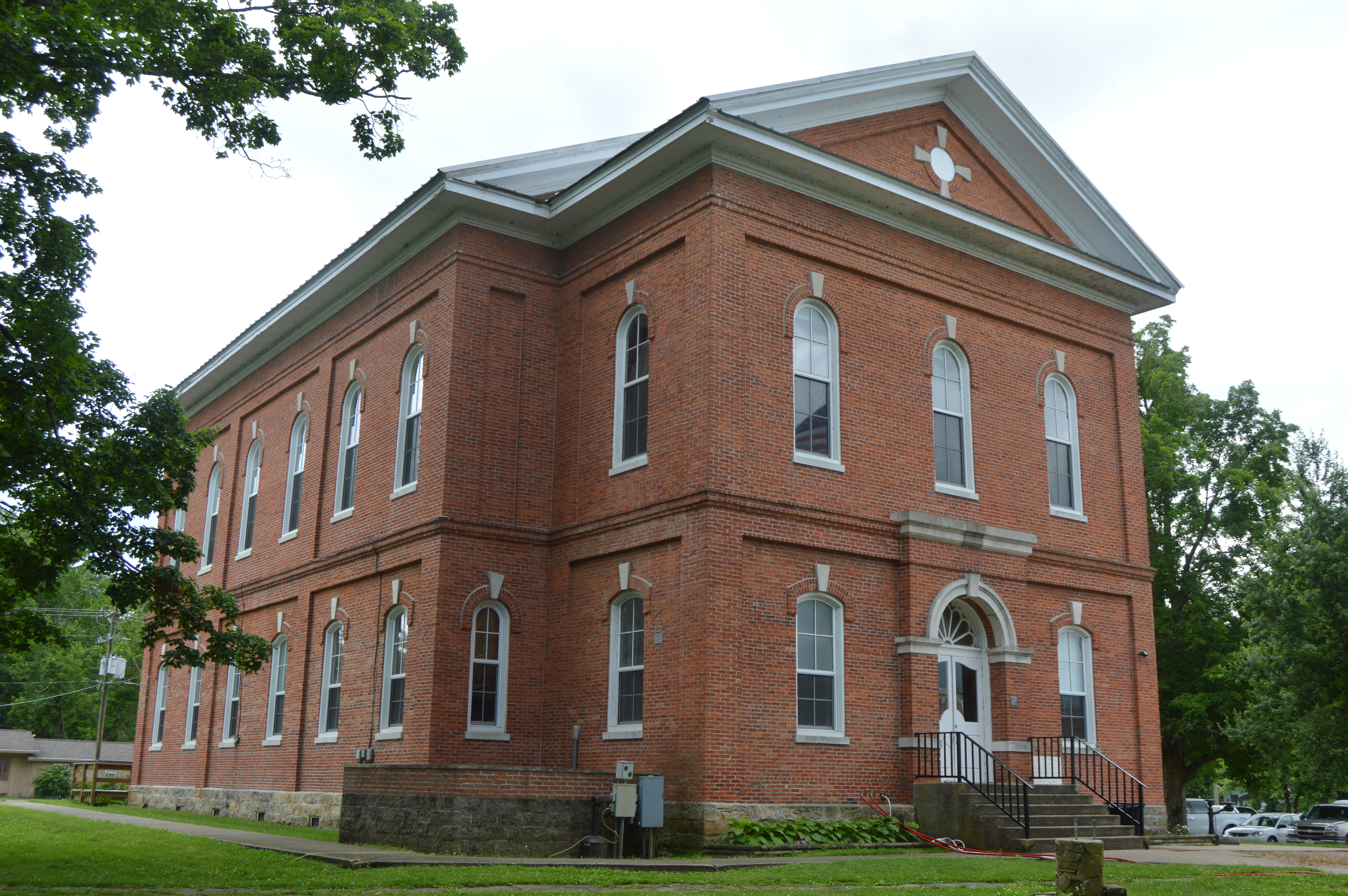
- Front and eastern side of the courthouse

- Location within Illinois Location within the United States
- Interactive map showing the location for Pope County Courthouse
- Location: 310 E. Main St. Golconda, Illinois
- Coordinates: 37°22′0″N 88°29′5″W
- Built: 1872
- Part of: Golconda Historic District (ID76000726)
- Added to NRHP: October 22, 1976

The Pope County Courthouse is a government building in Golconda, the county seat of Pope County, Illinois, United States. The county's third courthouse, it has remained in operation since the early 1870s, making it one of Illinois' oldest buildings currently still used as a courthouse.

== History ==
Golconda was platted by senator Thomas Ferguson in 1816, and he reserved one of its lots for a future courthouse. Pope County was organized in the same year, and Ferguson's town was chosen to become the county seat. After a period of using Ferguson's house as a temporary courthouse, the county commissioners paid Robert Scott $66.66½ to construct a log courthouse measuring 24 by 26 feet (7.3 m × 7.9 m). This building lasted only a short while, as the county government contracted with James Hankins to build a new courthouse in 1831 on land donated by Daniel Field, who completed it in 1833 after Hankins repeatedly failed to meet construction deadlines.

Today's courthouse postdates the Civil War. By 1870, the 1833 courthouse was in poor condition, and a county judge outright refused to use the building for fear that it would collapse. Pope County officials paid the architects of Young and Frick to design a new courthouse in 1871, the construction firm of Yost and Layman did most of the work in the following year, and construction was finished in 1873. Its final cost was slightly higher than $20,000.

== Current status ==
Located in a small park on Main Street, it is one of Illinois' oldest active courthouses. The building is two stories tall with a gable roof and brick walls, and a prominent belt course separates the two stories. Six windows are placed in three bays on the side, while the front of the building (narrower than the main body) is pierced by a single side window and three facade openings on each floor: a central door and two windows on the first floor, and three windows on the second. An oculus is set amid a pediment above the second story of the facade. Surrounding buildings on Main Street include commercial buildings, residences, and Presbyterian and Lutheran churches. A monument on the courthouse lawn honors Sarah Lusk Ferguson, a pioneer-era woman who operated a ferry on the Ohio River connecting Golconda with Kentucky after the death of her husband.

Much of central Golconda was named a historic district, the Golconda Historic District, and listed on the National Register of Historic Places in 1976. The Pope County Courthouse was named a contributing property to the district, and a later Forest Service survey of the region deemed it the district's focal point.
