= Illinois Historic Preservation Division =

State-level historic preservation agency

The Illinois Historic Preservation Division (formerly Illinois Historic Preservation Agency) is a division of the Illinois Department of Natural Resources within the Illinois state government. It is tasked with the duty of maintaining State-owned historic sites, and maximizing their educational and recreational value to visitors or on-line users. In addition, it manages the process for applications within the state for additions to the National Register of Historic Places and other federal preservation schemes.

== History of agency ==
The Illinois Historic Preservation Agency (IHPA) was created by Illinois state law in July 1985. What was the agency's oldest bureau, the Illinois State Historical Library, was created in 1889, but the origins of the agency could be said to date back to the state's involvement in building and caring for the Lincoln Tomb in Springfield, Illinois, in 1865.

During the 20th century, the state of Illinois acquired and restored a wide variety of historic properties throughout the state. One key asset, Lincoln's New Salem State Historic Site in Menard County, a reconstruction of a village where Abraham Lincoln lived in the 1830s, was established in the 1930s. The agency also administers the Cahokia World Heritage Site which includes the largest pre-columbian construction in the Americas north of Mexico, having also acquired the site in the early 20th century for state protection.

The IHPA continued to grow after its creation in 1985, largely because of continued public interest in Lincoln as the bicentennial of his birth approached in 2009. The Abraham Lincoln Presidential Library and Museum (ALPLM), also in Springfield, Illinois, was dedicated in 2005. Unlike most modern presidential libraries, the Lincoln Library is state-owned.

The proposed 2016 budget of Governor Bruce Rauner sought to eliminate the agency, assigning its duties to the Illinois Department of Commerce and Economic Opportunity. Opponents of the move claimed that the Commerce Department had neither the expertise nor the interest to carry out the agency's functions and that any savings from the agency's 2015 budget of $15 million would be minimal.

In 2017, the Agency was split, with the historic preservation and site management duties falling to a reorganized Division within the Illinois Department of Natural Resources (which manages State Parks and other resources), and the Library (ALPLM) becoming an independent agency.

== List of Illinois State Historic Sites ==
The following is an alphabetical listing of the more than 50 Illinois State Historic Sites that are under the jurisdiction of the Illinois Historic Preservation Division:

- Albany Mounds State Historic Site, Whiteside County
- Apple River Fort State Historic Site, Jo Daviess County
- Bishop Hill State Historic Site, Henry County
- Black Hawk State Historic Site, Rock Island County
- Bryant Cottage State Historic Site, Piatt County
- Buel House, Pope County
- Cahokia Courthouse State Historic Site, St. Clair County
- Cahokia Mounds State Historic Site, Madison County and St. Clair County
- Campbell's Island State Memorial, Rock Island County
- Carl Sandburg State Historic Site, Knox County
- Crenshaw House, Gallatin County
- Dana–Thomas House State Historic Site, Sangamon County
- David Davis Mansion State Historic Site, McLean County
- Douglas Tomb State Historic Site, Cook County
- Fort de Chartres State Historic Site, Randolph County
- Fort Kaskaskia State Historic Site, Randolph County
- Governor Bond State Memorial, Randolph County
- Governor Coles State Memorial, Madison County
- Governor Horner State Memorial, Cook County
- Governor Small Memorial and Park, Kankakee County
- Grand Village of the Illinois, LaSalle County (not open to the public)
- Halfway Tavern, Marion County
- Hofmann Tower, Cook County
- Illinois Vietnam Veterans Memorial, Sangamon County
  - Purple Heart Memorial (Illinois)
- Jarrot Mansion State Historic Site, St. Clair County
- Jubilee College State Historic Site, Peoria County
- Kaskaskia Bell State Memorial, Randolph County
- Kincaid Mounds State Historic Site, Massac County
- Korean War Memorial (Illinois), Sangamon County
- Lewis and Clark State Historic Site, Madison County
- Lincoln–Herndon Law Offices State Historic Site, Sangamon County
- Lincoln Log Cabin State Historic Site (including the Reuben Moore Home), Coles County
- Lincoln Monument, Lee County
- Lincoln Tomb State Historic Site, Sangamon County
- Lincoln Trail State Memorial, Lawrence County
- Lincoln's New Salem State Historic Site, Menard County
- Lovejoy State Memorial, Madison County
- Martin–Boismenue House, St. Clair County
- Metamora Courthouse State Historic Site, Woodford County
- Mount Pulaski Courthouse State Historic Site, Logan County
- Norwegian Settlers Memorial, LaSalle County
- Old Market House State Historic Site, Jo Daviess County
- Old State Capitol State Historic Site, Sangamon County
- Pierre Menard Home State Historic Site, Randolph County
- Postville Courthouse State Historic Site, Logan County
- Pullman Site, including:
  - Hotel Florence, Cook County
- Rose Hotel, Hardin County
- Shawneetown Bank State Historic Site, Gallatin County
- U.S. Grant Home State Historic Site, Jo Daviess County
- Vachel Lindsay Home, Sangamon County
- Vandalia State House State Historic Site, Fayette County
- Washburne House State Historic Site, Jo Daviess County
- Wild Bill Hickok Memorial, LaSalle County
- World War II Illinois Veterans Memorial, Sangamon County

In addition to those above administered by the Illinois Historic Preservation Division, other historic sites operated by Illinois state agencies include:

- Dickson Mounds, operated by Illinois Department of Natural Resources (IDNR)
- Fort Massac State Park, operated by IDNR
- Starved Rock State Park, operated by IDNR

== NRHP multiple property submissions ==
This List of NRHP Multiple Property Submission in Illinois are properties not part of a historic district but are, rather, listed individually on the National Register of Historic Places after a collective nomination with other similar properties, called a Multiple Property Submission.

- American Woman's League Chapter Houses Thematic Resources
- Archaeological Sites of Starved Rock State Park
- Architectural and Historic Resources of Vermont, Illinois, Multiple Property Submission
- Black Metropolis Thematic Resources
- Caught in the Middle; the Civil War on the Lower Ohio River
- Civil War Era National Cemeteries
- Coles County Highway Bridges Over the Embarras River Thematic Resources
- Fraternity and Sorority Houses at the Urbana-Champaign Campus of the University of Illinois Multiple Property Submission
- Highway Bridges in Iowa 1868-1945
- Historic and Historical Archaeological Resources of the Cherokee Trail of Tears
- Historic and Architectural Resources of Route 66 Through Illinois
- Historic Fairgrounds in Illinois Multiple Property Submission
- Historic Resources of Grafton, Illinois, ca. 1830-1943, Multiple Property Submission
- Historic Resources of Highland Park Multiple Resource Area
- Historic Resources of Maywood, Illinois, Multiple Property Submission
- Historic Resources of the Chicago Park District Multiple Property Submission
- Hyde Park Apartment Hotels Thematic Resources
- Illinois Carnegie Libraries Multiple Property Submission
- Illinois State Park Lodges and Cabins Thematic Resources
- Metal Highway Bridges of Fulton County Thematic Resources
- Motor Row, Chicago, Illinois
- Native American Rock Art Sites of Illinois Multiple Property Submission
- Round Barns in Illinois Thematic Resources
- Suburban Apartment Buildings in Evanston Thematic Resources
- University of Illinois Buildings by Nathan Clifford Ricker Thematic Resources
- University of Illinois Buildings Designed by Charles A. Platt
