= Walking the Trail =

1991 memoir by Jerry Ellis

- Kindle edition
- Author: Jerry Ellis
- Language: English
- Genre: Memoir
- Publisher: Delacorte Press
- Publication date: 1991
- Publication place: United States
- Media type: Print (hardcover)
- ISBN: 9780803267435

Walking the Trail: One Man's Journey along the Cherokee Trail of Tears is the 1991 book by Jerry Ellis telling the story of his 900-mile walk along the Cherokee Trail of Tears, the same walk his ancestors were forced to take in 1838. Walking the Trail has been used in classrooms and as a teaching resource by award-winning educators, including James Percoco who is in the National Teachers Hall of Fame.

== Reception ==
The work was well received, with the Los Angeles Times stating that "Jerry Ellis is an ideal companion for a long ramble along the back roads of America, which is precisely what he provides in Walking the Trail, a picaresque account of his trek over the Trail of Tears in commemoration of his Cherokee ancestors and in search of some elusive ideal of freedom and fulfillment."
