= Jerry Ellis (author) =

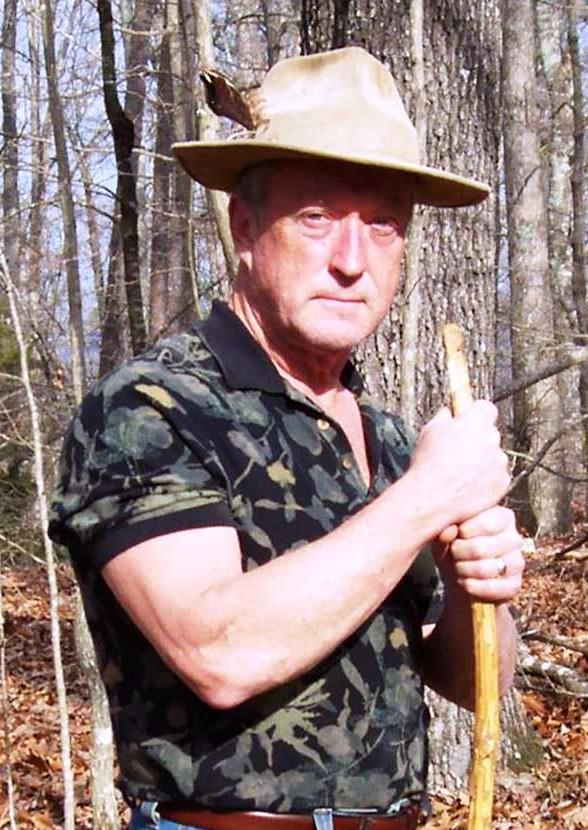
- Born: 1947 (age 78–79); Fort Payne, Alabama, U.S.
- Occupation: Writer
- Spouse: Debi Holmes-Binney
- Website: Jerry Ellis on Facebook

Jerry Ellis (born 1947) is an American author of fiction and non-fiction works best known for the book Walking the Trail written after he walked the 900 mile route of the Cherokee Trail of Tears. Ellis has been profiled and his books reviewed in several national and regional publications and on public television.

== Biography ==
Jerry Ellis was born in Fort Payne, Alabama. He is the brother of actress Sandra Ellis Lafferty. He graduated from the University of Alabama in 1970. In 1989 he was the first person in the modern world to walk the Cherokee Trail of Tears. Ellis lives in both Fort Payne, Alabama, and in Rome, Italy. Ellis is the co-founder of Tanager House, an artist retreat set on 200 wooded acres in the mountains of north Alabama, where he leads workshops on writing/publishing, spirituality, self-actualization.

== Bibliography ==
- Walking the Trail: One Man's Journey along the Cherokee Trail of Tears (1991); ISBN 978-0803267435
- Bareback! One Man's Journey Along the Pony Express Trail (1993)
- On the Trail of the Pony Express (2002)
- Marching through Georgia: My Walk along Sherman's Route (2002)
- Walking to Canterbury: A Modern Journey Through Chaucer's Medieval England (2007)
- Ciao From Roma! Spring in the Eternal City of Love with Paolo Canova (2012)
- CHEROKEE HISTORY FOR INDIAN LOVERS (2013)
- Native American Thriller--Parts One and Two (2013,2014)
- TWO WOLVES, A Cherokee's Journey to Feed the Sacred One (2014)
