= World War II Illinois Veterans Memorial =

Coordinates: 39.819721°N 89.661471°W

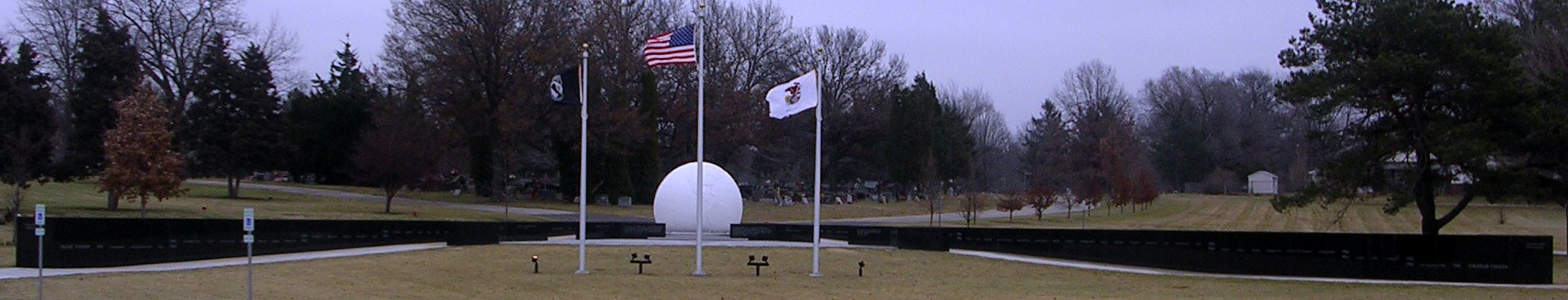
- Interactive map of World War II Illinois Veterans Memorial
- Location: Oak Ridge Cemetery; Springfield, Illinois
- Designer: Dan Nardi
- Length: 24 feet (7.3 m)
- Height: 4 feet (1.2 m)
- Dedicated date: December 4, 2004
- Dedicated to: World War II veterans
- Website: ww2il.com

The World War II Illinois Veterans Memorial is the official memorial of the U.S. state of Illinois maintained in honor of veterans of the war, as well as those bereaved during the course of the conflict. 987,000 Illinois residents served in uniform during the war, and 22,000 gave up their lives during the campaigns. Planning for the memorial began in 1999, and the memorial was dedicated in 2004. The memorial is in Oak Ridge Cemetery, located on the north side of Springfield, Illinois, the state capital.

The memorial is a multi-element sculptural installation that centers on a 22-ton (20-tonne) white globe 12 feet (3.5m) in diameter, demonstrating the global nature of the conflict. Spreading outward from the globe are a series of black granite walls into which the names of various battles and campaigns of the war are incised. Stainless steel buttons inserted into the globe pinpoint the locations of the battles.

As of 2023, frequent tribute observances gather together representatives from the diminishing headcount of veterans of this conflict. The executive board of the memorial also organizes efforts to collect oral memories from survivors. In some cases, relatives seeking information about their missing kin may contact the Memorial's executive board.

Although the Memorial is de jure a historic site of the Illinois Historic Preservation Agency, in practice it is maintained by the staff of Oak Ridge Cemetery and the Memorial's independent governing board.

== See also ==
- National World War II Memorial
