= Old State Capitol State Historic Site =

Building in Springfield, Illinois

- Old Illinois State Capitol
- U.S. National Register of Historic Places
- U.S. National Historic Landmark
- Illinois State Historic Site
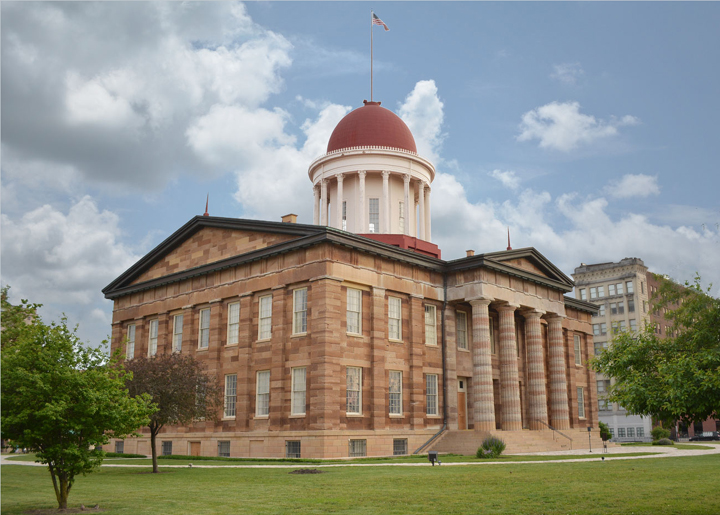

- Location within Illinois Location within the United States
- Location: Springfield, Illinois
- Coordinates: 39°48′04″N 89°38′55″W
- Built: 1837
- Architect: John Francis Rague
- Architectural style: Greek Revival
- NRHP reference No.: 66000331

Significant dates
- Added to NRHP: October 15, 1966
- Designated NHL: July 4, 1961

The Old State Capitol State Historic Site is a former capitol building for the U.S. state of Illinois. Located in Springfield, it is one of two preserved former Illinois capitol buildings (the other being in Vandalia). It was built in the Greek Revival style in 1837–1840, when Springfield became the capital city, and served as the state house from 1840 to 1876, when it was replaced by the current capitol. It is the site of candidacy announcements by Abraham Lincoln in 1858 and Barack Obama in 2007. It was designated a National Historic Landmark in 1961, primarily for its association with Lincoln and his political rival Stephen Douglas.

== State House ==
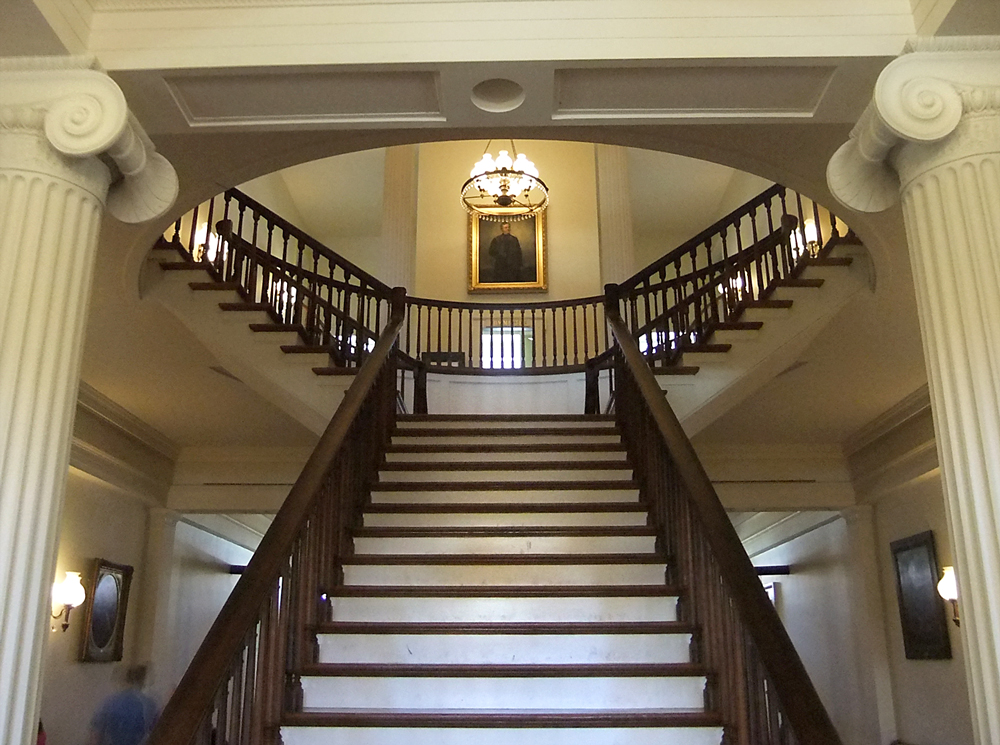
First floor interior and staircase of Old State Capitol

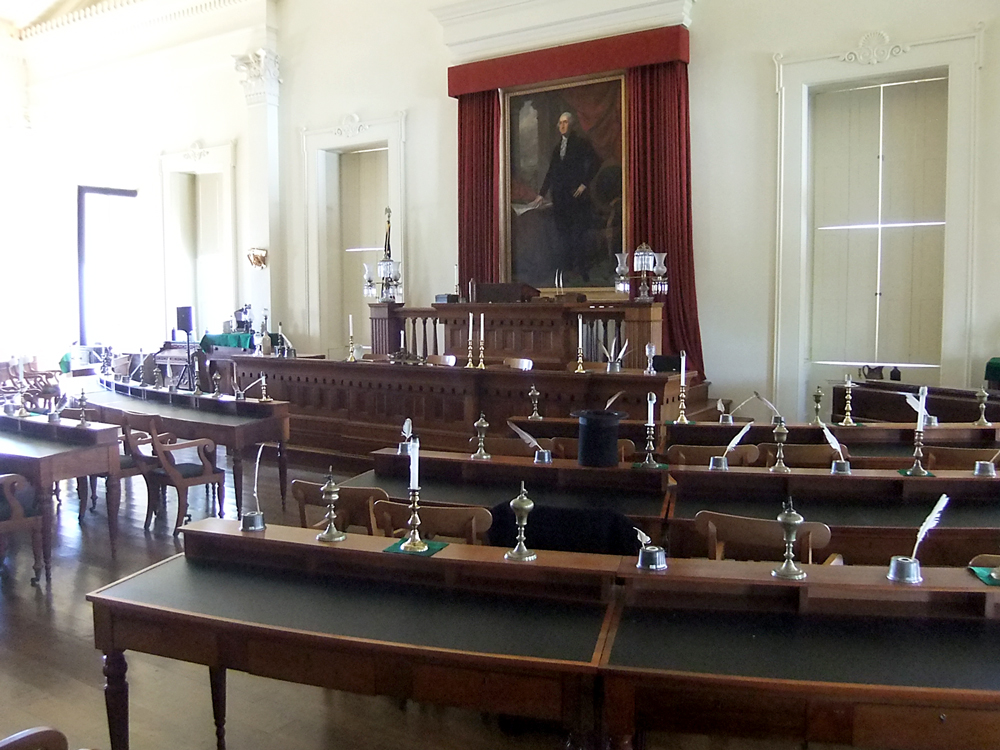
The Illinois House of Representatives chamber on second floor is where Abraham Lincoln served

From 1820 through 1837, the political capital of the young state of Illinois was the small village of Vandalia, Illinois, in the south center of the state. On the National Road, Vandalia was initially well-situated to fulfill its governmental role. As northern Illinois opened to settlement in the 1830s, however, public pressure grew for the capital to be relocated to a location closer to the geographic center of the state.

A caucus of nine Illinois lawmakers, including the young Whig Party lawyer Abraham Lincoln, led the effort to have the capital moved to the Sangamon County village of Springfield. Their efforts were successful in 1837, when the Illinois General Assembly passed a law creating a two-year transition period with the goal of moving the capital to Springfield in 1839.

Workers built a state office building, large for the time, on the central square in Springfield in 1837–1840. The cost was $240,000, of which the city of Springfield paid $50,000. The structure, designed by local architect John Francis Rague and constructed of yellow limestone from the nearby town of Crow's Mill, contained chambers for both houses of the General Assembly, offices for the Governor of Illinois and other executive officials, and a chamber for the Illinois Supreme Court.

It was in this building that Lincoln served his final term as a state lawmaker in 1840–41. As a lawyer, he pleaded cases before the state supreme court in this building (1841–1860). In the Illinois House chamber, Lincoln made his House Divided speech in June 1858, announcing his candidacy for the U.S. Senate. It was to the same chamber, in May 1865, that his body was returned to lie in state, arriving from Washington, D.C., prior to final burial in Springfield's Oak Ridge Cemetery.

As a result of economic growth spurred by the American Civil War and consequent industrialization, this fifth or Old State Capitol was, by the 1870s, too small to serve the purpose for which it had been built. Illinois built its sixth and current State Capitol building four blocks to the southwest, and the state government turned the Old State Capitol over to Sangamon County to serve as the county courthouse.

== Courthouse ==
From 1876 until 1966, the Old State Capitol was the county courthouse of Sangamon County. During this time the building was extensively altered. In 1839, a two-floor building had been large enough to hold the entire governmental structure of Illinois; but after continued growth in the population of Springfield and the surrounding townships, in 1898–1899 Sangamon County raised the historic structure 11 feet (3.4 meters), added a third floor under it, and demolished and reconfigured the interior to hold circuit court rooms and office space.

In the early 1960s, the Civil War centennial rekindled interest in the historic central Springfield structure. In addition, Sangamon County's space needs had grown so urgent as to require the county to build for itself an entirely new courthouse building. The county retroceded the Old State Capitol to the state of Illinois, this time as a place of public assembly and museum of Lincoln history.

== Illinois Historic Preservation Agency ==
In order to restore and preserve the Old State Capitol, which had been extensively altered during its life as a courthouse, workers completely dismantled it, stone by stone, and rebuilt it. The public areas of the Old State Capitol were reconstructed to resemble the appearance of the building in 1860, when Lincoln last saw the capitol prior to his departure to Washington.

The state also excavated the plaza under and around the Old State Capitol to construct an extensive office and parking complex, which later served as the headquarters of the Illinois Historic Preservation Agency.

The reconstruction work was carried out in 1966–1969, and the rebuilt House Chamber was available for the state's Constitutional Convention to use in 1970. The rebuilt Old State Capitol was extensively renovated in 2023–2025.

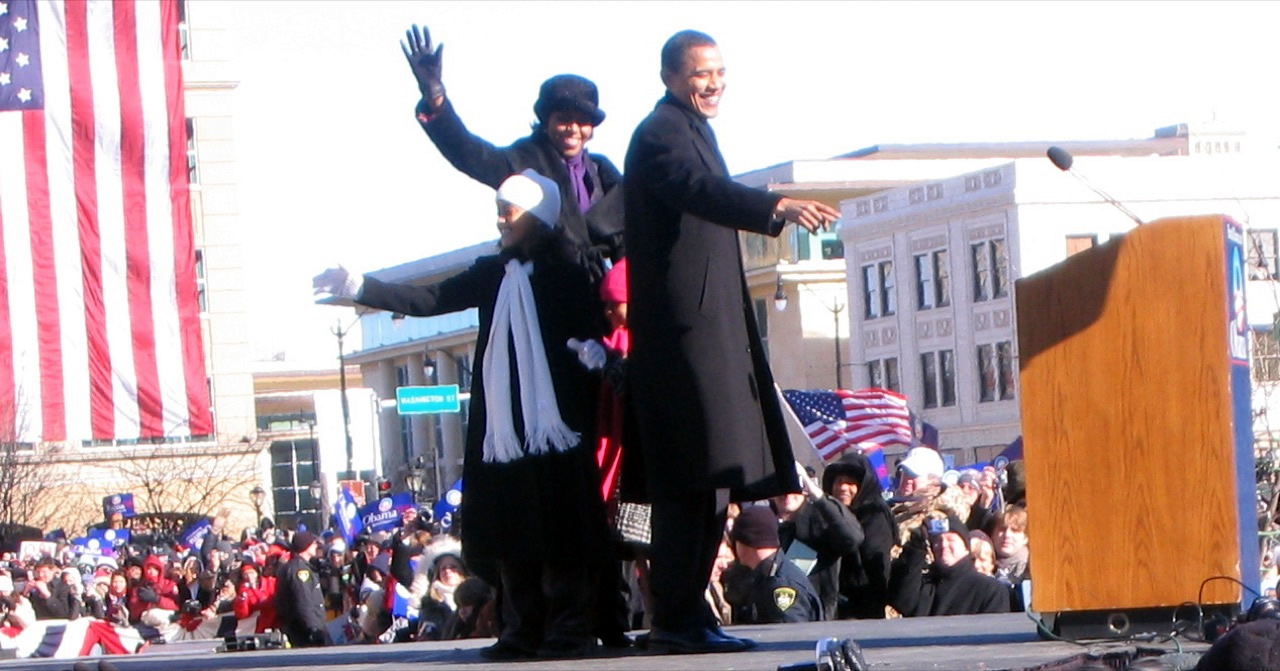
Obama's campaign kickoff, February 2007

The restored Old State Capitol continues to be used for ceremonial functions. In February 2007 then-U.S. Senator Barack Obama officially announced his candidacy for President of the United States at this location, and in August 2008 he formally introduced his vice-presidential candidate, Joe Biden, with the building as a backdrop.

Visitors can tour the capitol on their own or take 30-minute guided tours.

== In popular culture ==
A commemorative one-cent piece was minted for general circulation in 2009 to celebrate Lincoln's work as a lawyer. It used the Old State Capitol, which incorporated a courtroom for the Illinois Supreme Court where Lincoln pleaded key cases in his legal career, as a backdrop.

The Old State Capitol grounds are used as the venue for the Springfield Old Capitol Art Fair, an annual May festival.

== See also ==
- List of National Historic Landmarks in Illinois
- National Register of Historic Places listings in Sangamon County, Illinois
- Illinois State Capitol
