= Oak Ridge Cemetery =

Historic cemetery in Springfield, Illinois

- U.S. National Register of Historic Places
- U.S. Historic district
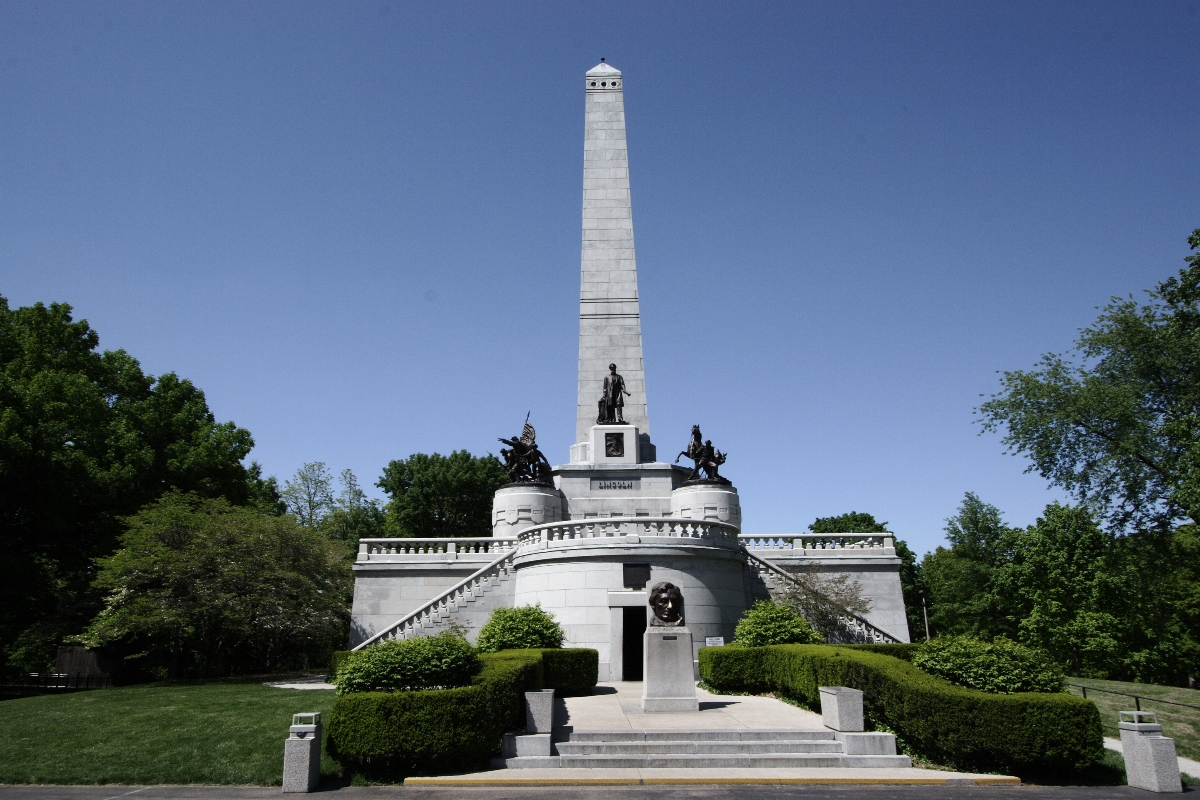
- Abraham Lincoln's tomb at Oak Ridge Cemetery.

- Location within Illinois Location within the United States
- Location: 1441 Monument Ave., Springfield, Illinois
- Coordinates: 39°49′25″N 89°39′28″W
- Area: 365 acres (148 ha)
- Built: 1855
- Architect: William Saunders
- Architectural style: Classical Revival, Romanesque
- NRHP reference No.: 95000986
- Added to NRHP: August 4, 1995

Oak Ridge Cemetery is an American cemetery in Springfield, Illinois.

The Lincoln Tomb, where Abraham Lincoln, his wife and all but one of their children lie, is there, as are the graves of other prominent Illinois figures. Opened in 1860, it was the third and is now the only public cemetery in Springfield, after the City Cemetery and Hutchinson.

The cemetery was designed by William Saunders in the Rural Cemetery Landscape Lawn style. The location was chosen for its topography, including rolling hills, key to this style. The many eponymous oak trees cover a ridge bordering low-lying Spring Creek, a landscape unusual in central Illinois. The newest, southwest section opened after 1945. Its design follows the Memorial Park style, in which roadways are wide enough for motor vehicles.

Oak Ridge has a Korean War memorial, the World War II Illinois Veterans Memorial and the Illinois Vietnam Veterans Memorial. The Springfield and Central Illinois African-American History Museum is adjacent.

== Notable burials ==
- William Henry Bissell
- Jacob Bunn
- John Whitfield Bunn
- Daniel Pope Cook
- John Cook
- Shelby Moore Cullom
- Jesse K. Dubois
- Elizabeth Todd Edwards
- Ninian Edwards, only governor of the Illinois Territory
- William Lee D. Ewing
- Nellie Grant – daughter of President Ulysses S. Grant
- William Herndon
- Elijah Iles
- William Jayne
- John L. Lewis – President of the United Mine Workers from 1919 to 1960
- Abraham Lincoln – sixteenth President of the United States during the Civil War
- Mary Todd Lincoln – Abraham's wife
- Fleetwood Lindley – the last person to have looked upon Lincoln's face in September 1901
- Vachel Lindsay
- John Alexander McClernand
- Alfred Orendorff
- John Carroll Power – first custodian of Lincoln's Tomb
- Alexander Starne – Illinois Secretary of State and Illinois Treasurer
- John T. Stuart – U.S. Congressman, lawyer, law partner of Abraham Lincoln
- John Riley Tanner
- Arthur Harrison Wilson (Medal of Honor)

== Gallery ==
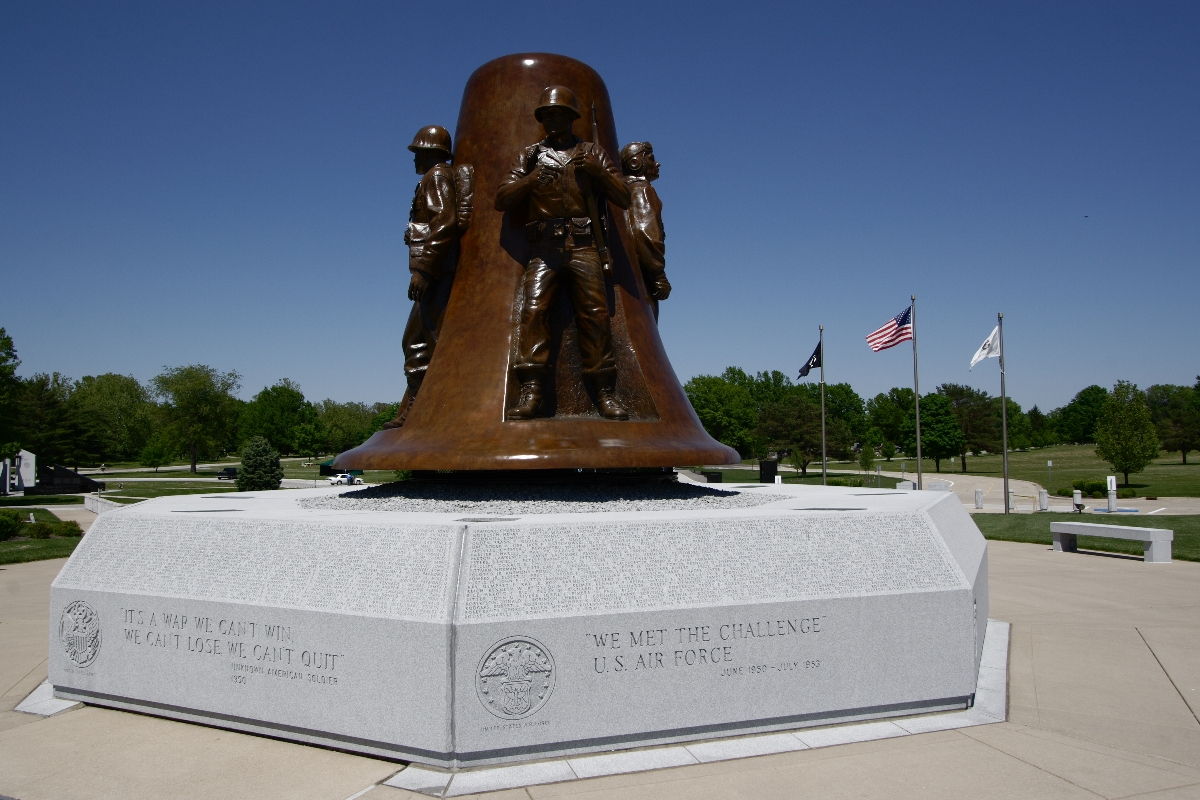
Korean War Memorial

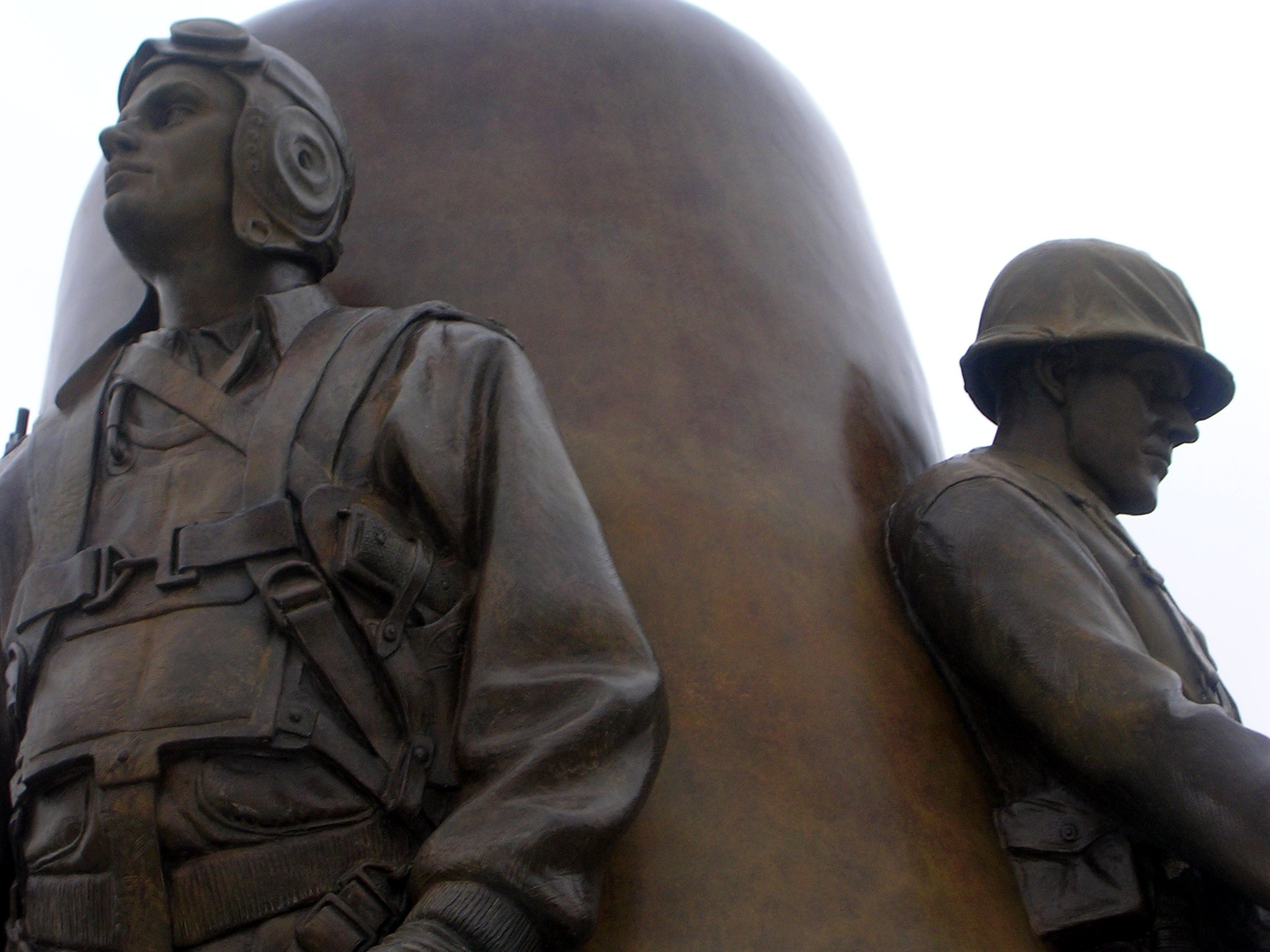
Close up of Korean War Memorial

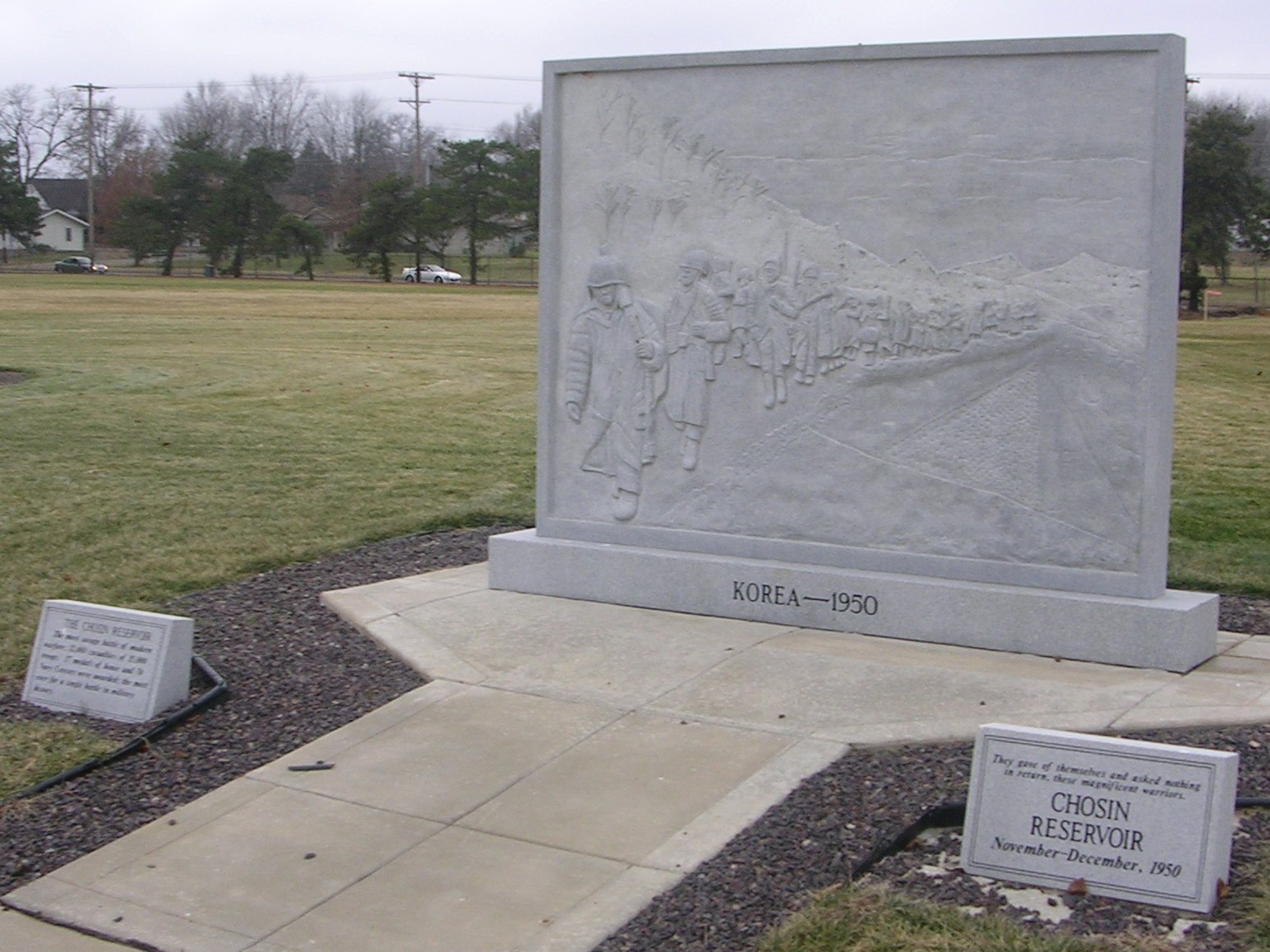
Battle of Chosin Reservoir Memorial

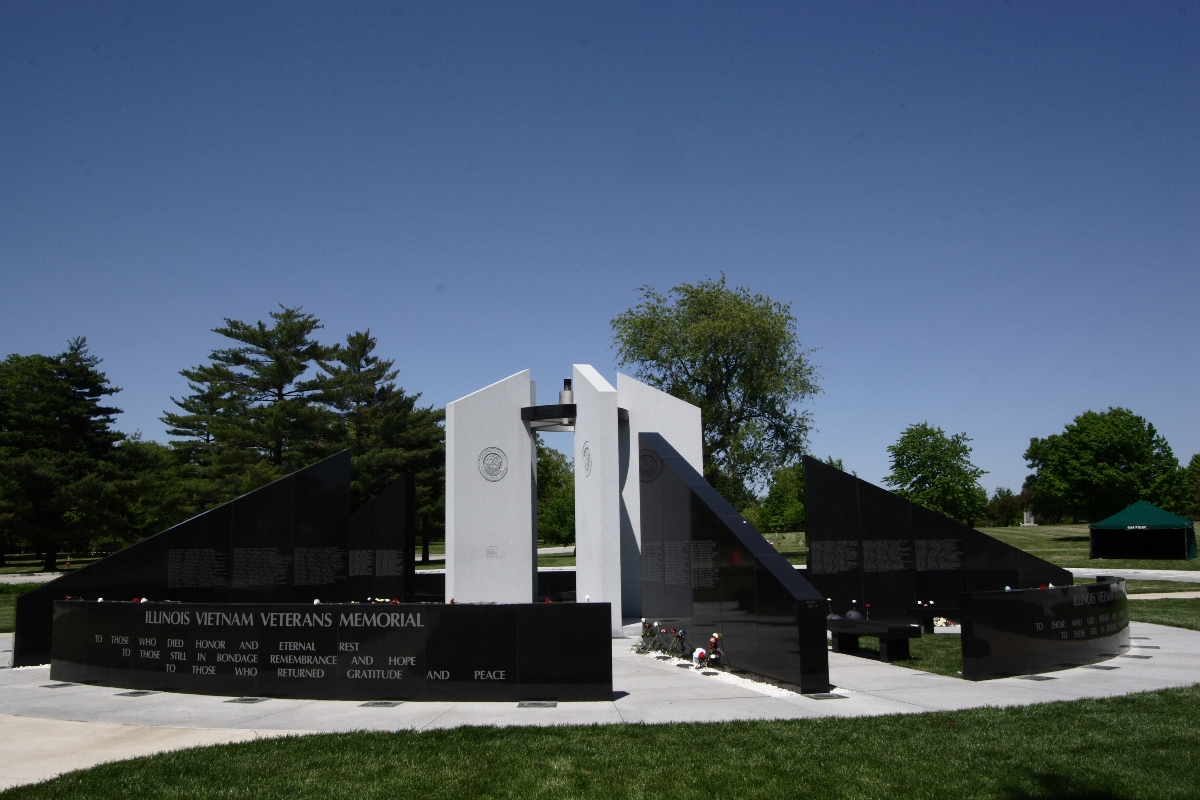
Illinois Vietnam Veterans Memorial

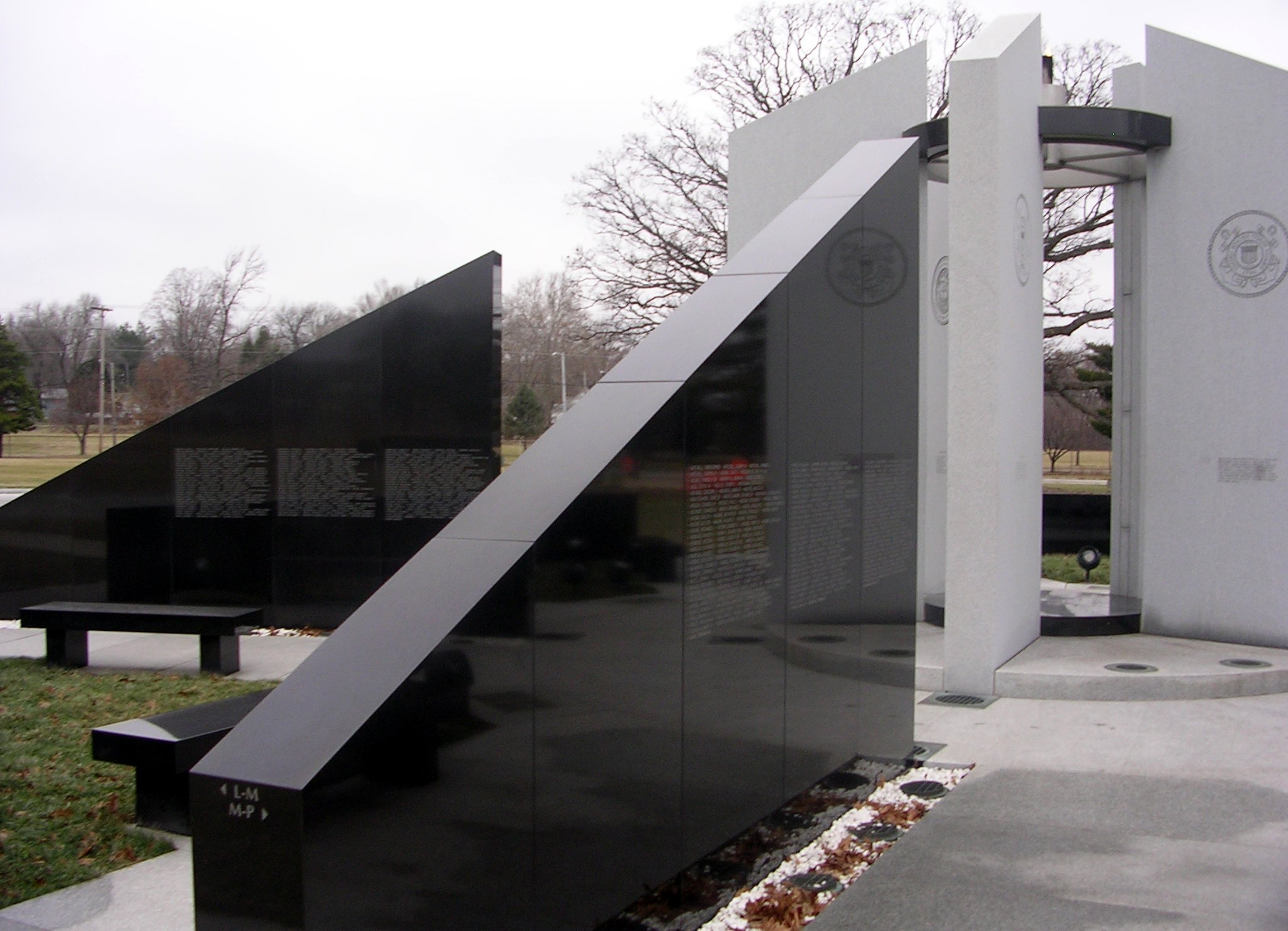
Vietnam War Memorial close up

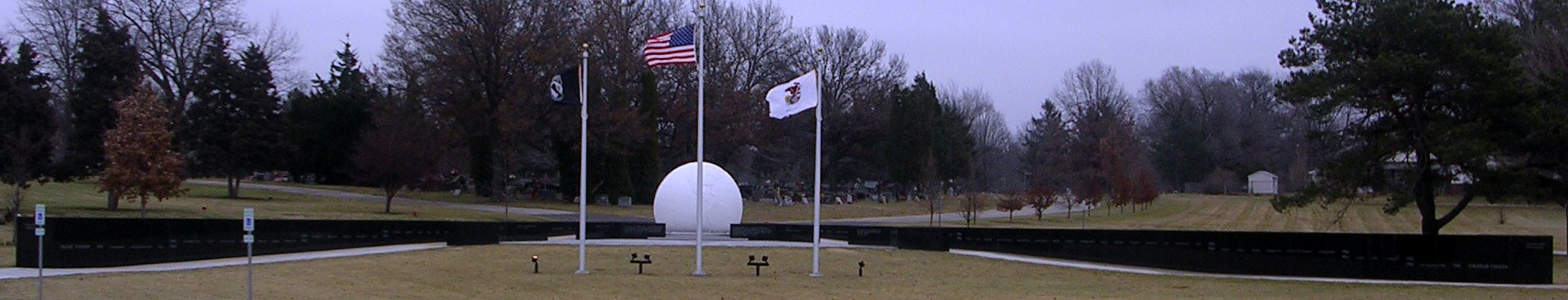
World War II Memorial

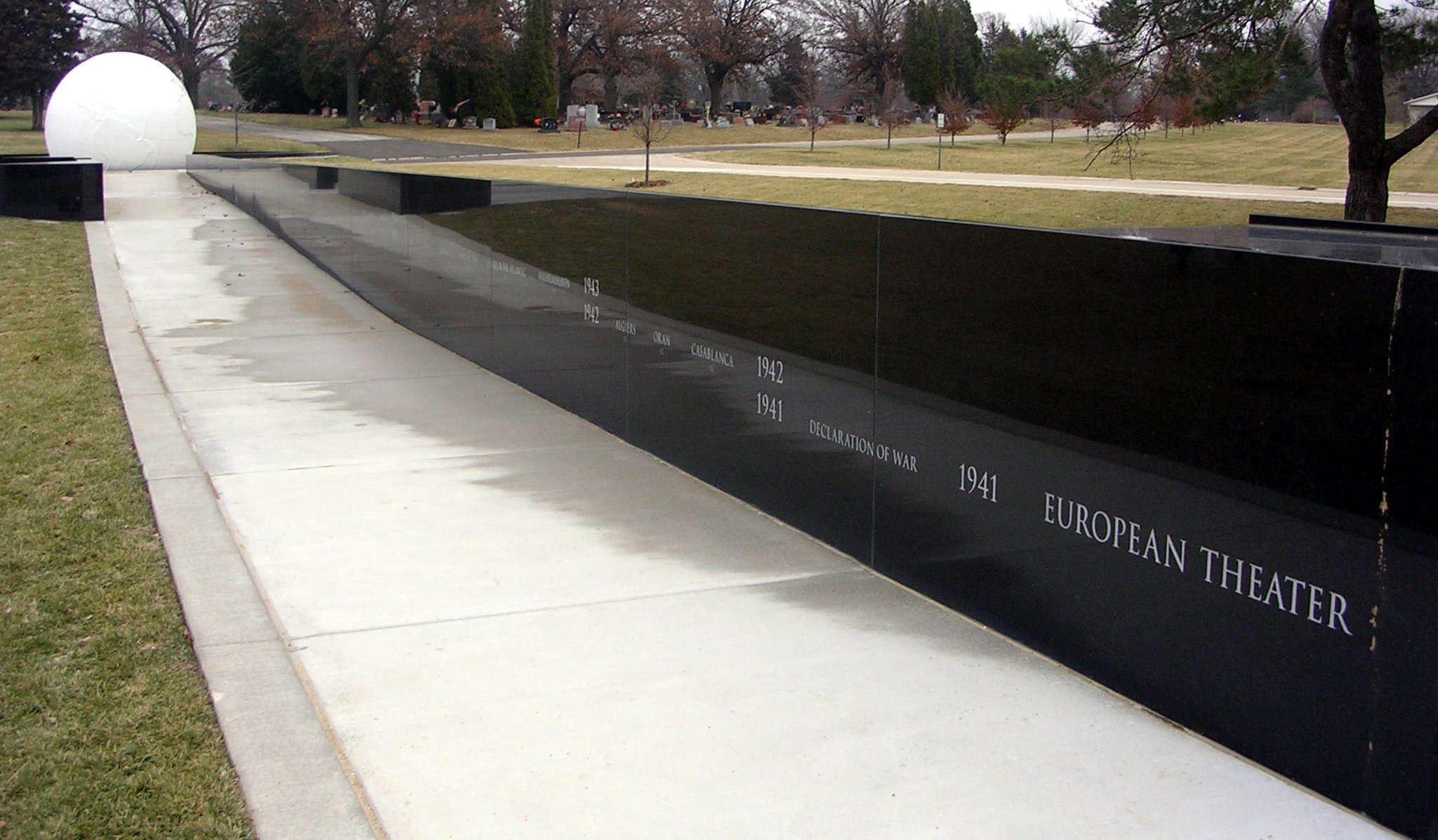
The European Theater side of the World War II Memorial

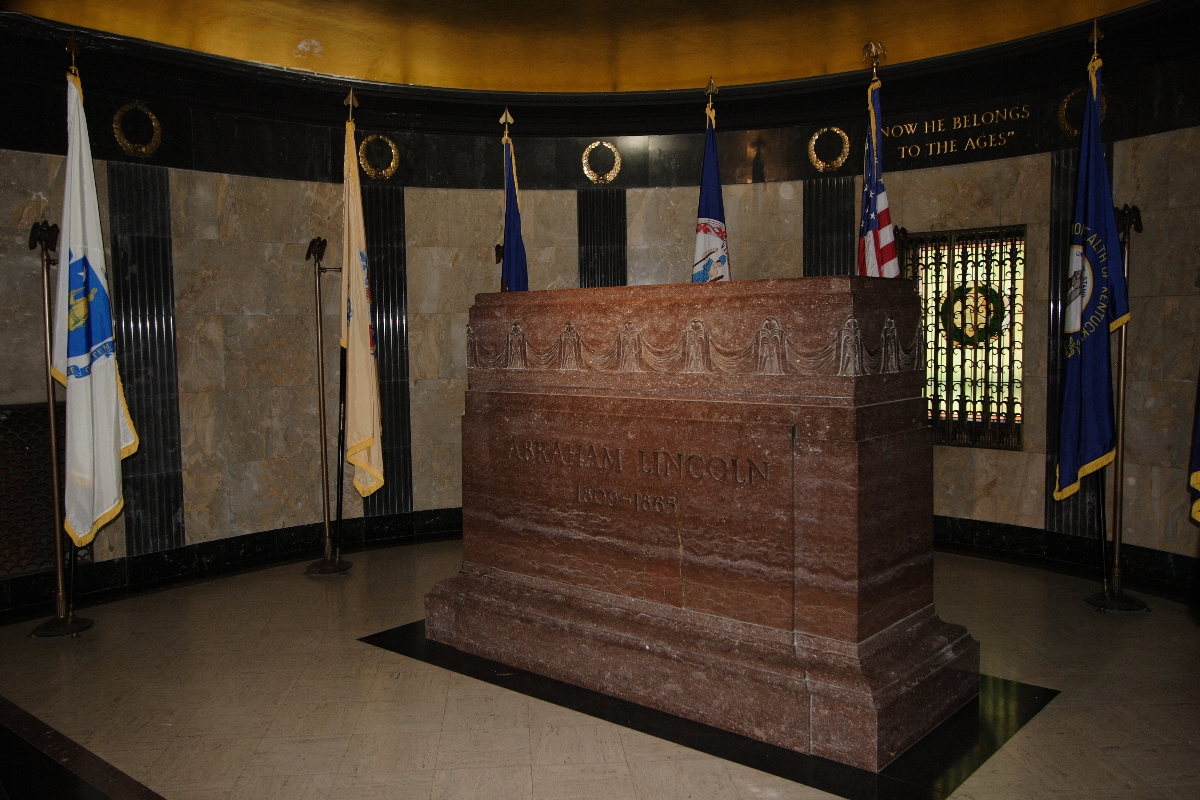
Lincoln's Tomb
Burial room

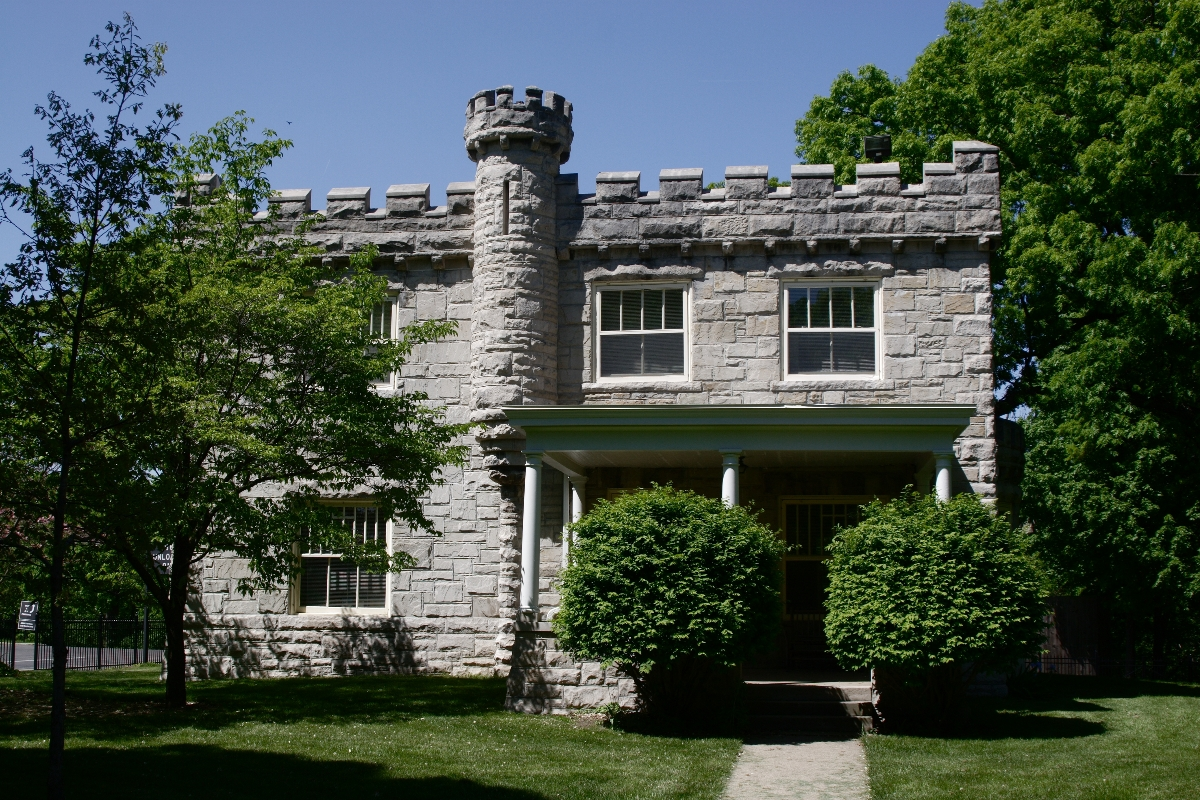
Lincoln's Tomb
Custodian's Residence

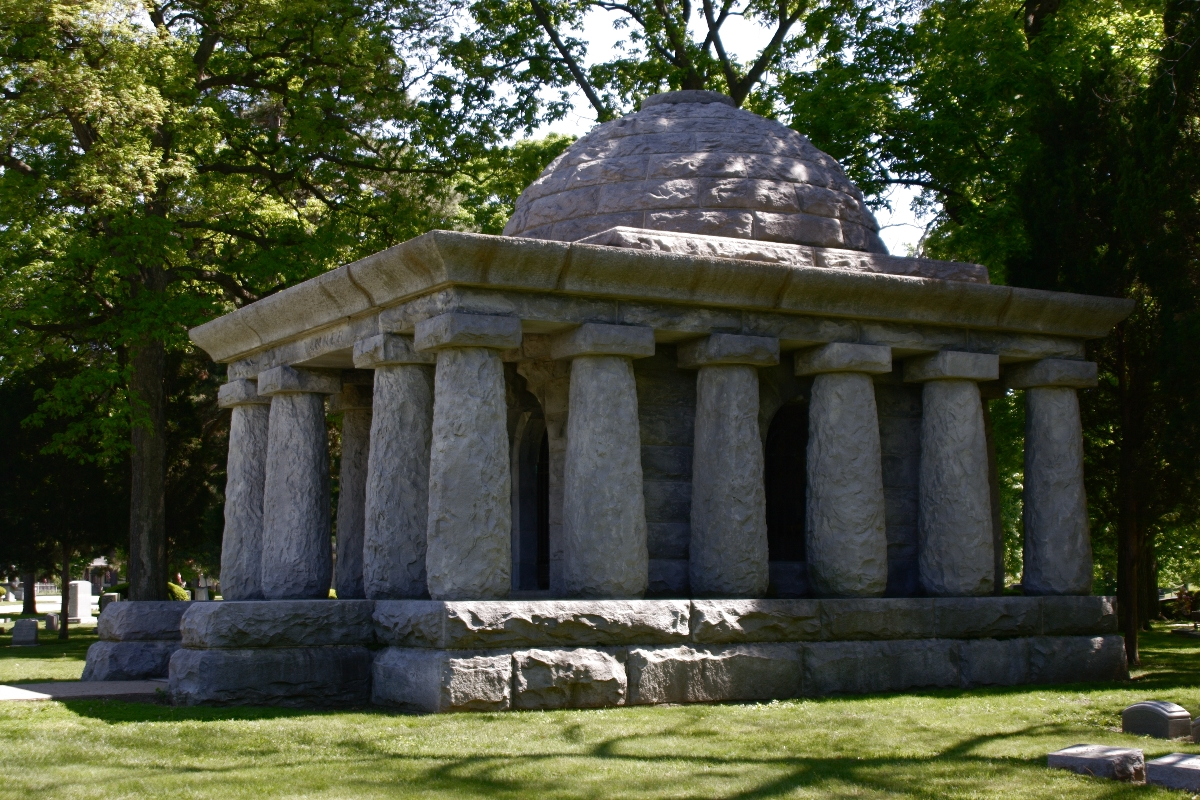
Governor John Riley Tanner's tomb

== See also ==
- List of burial places of presidents and vice presidents of the United States
