= 21st United States Congress =

1829-1831 U.S. Congress

←	20th	22nd	→
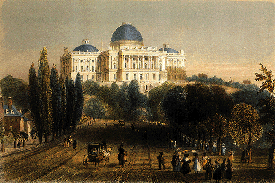
- United States Capitol (1827)

Overview
- Legislative body: United States Congress
- Jurisdiction: United States
- Term: March 4, 1829 – March 4, 1831

Senate
- Members: 48
- President: John C. Calhoun (J)
- President pro tempore: Samuel Smith (J)
- Party control: Jacksonian

House of Representatives
- Members: 213 representatives 3 non-voting delegates
- Speaker: Andrew Stevenson (J)
- Party control: Jacksonian

Sessions
- Special (Note: Special session of the Senate.): March 4, 1829 – March 17, 1829
- 1st: December 7, 1829 – May 31, 1830
- 2nd: December 6, 1830 – March 3, 1831

The 21st United States Congress was a meeting of the legislative branch of the United States federal government, consisting of the United States Senate and the United States House of Representatives. It met in Washington, D.C., from March 4, 1829, to March 4, 1831, during the first two years of Andrew Jackson's presidency. The apportionment of seats in the House of Representatives was based on the 1820 United States census. Both chambers had a Jacksonian majority.

== Major events ==
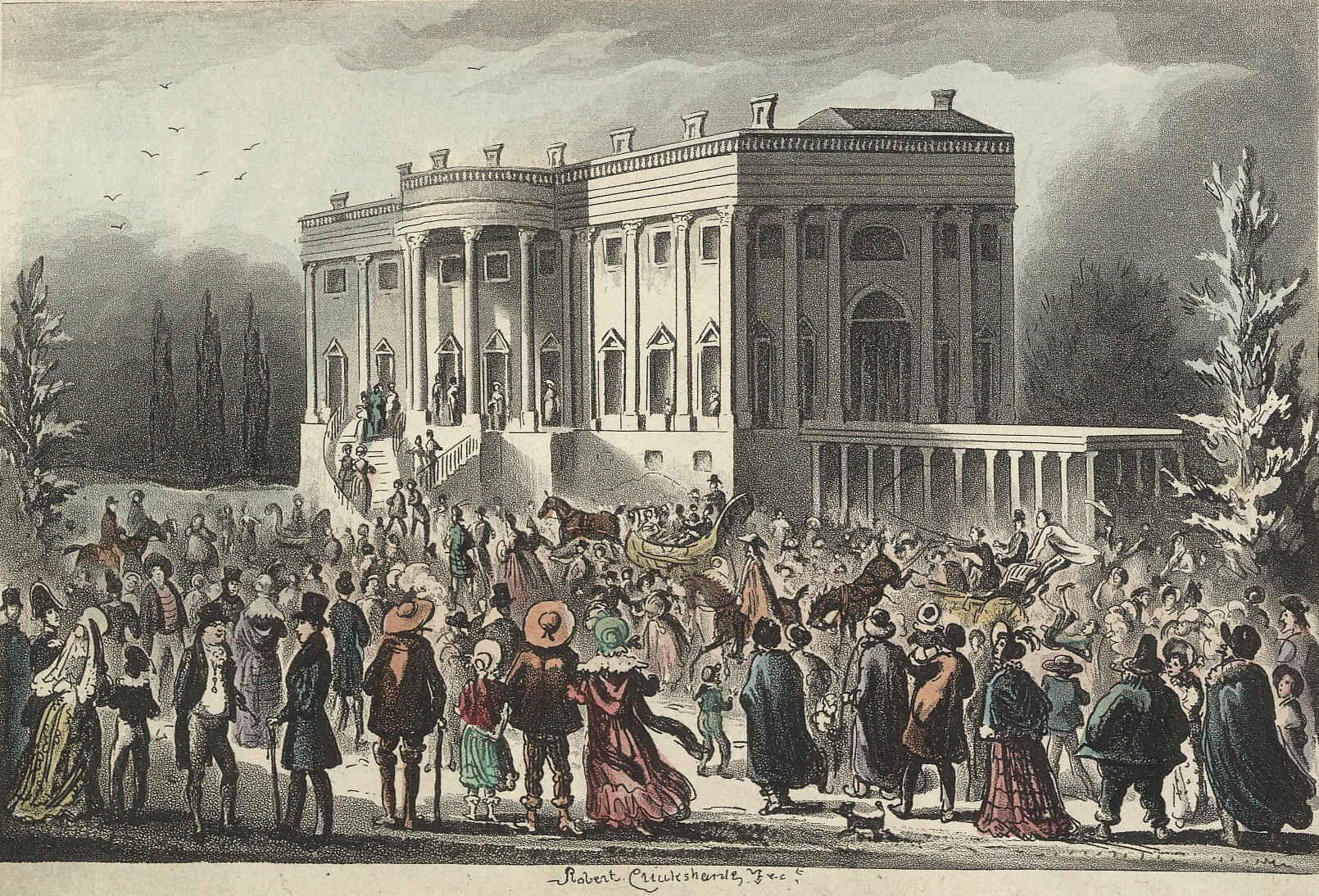
March 4, 1829: Andrew Jackson inaugurated President

- March 4, 1829: Andrew Jackson became 7th President of the United States
- May 10–14, 1830: Senators John McKinley, Powhatan Ellis, and Robert H. Adams, and Representatives Clement Comer Clay, Mark Alexander, William S. Archer, Dixon H. Lewis, and Thomas Hinds met with the French chargé d'affaires. The Americans asserted that France should pay reparations for damages in incurred during the Quasi-War of 1798-1800, and the meeting became very contentious. At one point, Representative Hinds threatened the chargé with a pistol. Eventually, only intervention by Senator John Forsyth prevented a major diplomatic incident.
  Shortly after this, Virginia governor John Floyd formally asked France's economic attaché to leave Virginia. Conflict with France over this issue would dominate American politics in 1835; the main instigator then was President Andrew Jackson.
- May 28 – Passage of the Indian Removal Act.
- September 27 – Treaty of Dancing Rabbit Creek with Choctaw nation. (First removal treaty signed after the Removal Act.)

== Major legislation ==
- May 28, 1830: Indian Removal Act, ch. 148, 4 Stat. 411

=== Not enacted ===
- May 27, 1830: Maysville Road Bill vetoed

== Treaties ==
- September 27, 1830: The Treaty of Dancing Rabbit Creek, the first removal treaty after the passage of the Indian Removal Act, is signed with the Choctaw.
- February 24, 1831: Treaty of Dancing Rabbit Creek proclaimed.

== Party summary ==
The count below identifies party affiliations at the beginning of the first session of this congress. Changes resulting from subsequent replacements are shown below in the "Changes in membership" section.

=== Senate ===
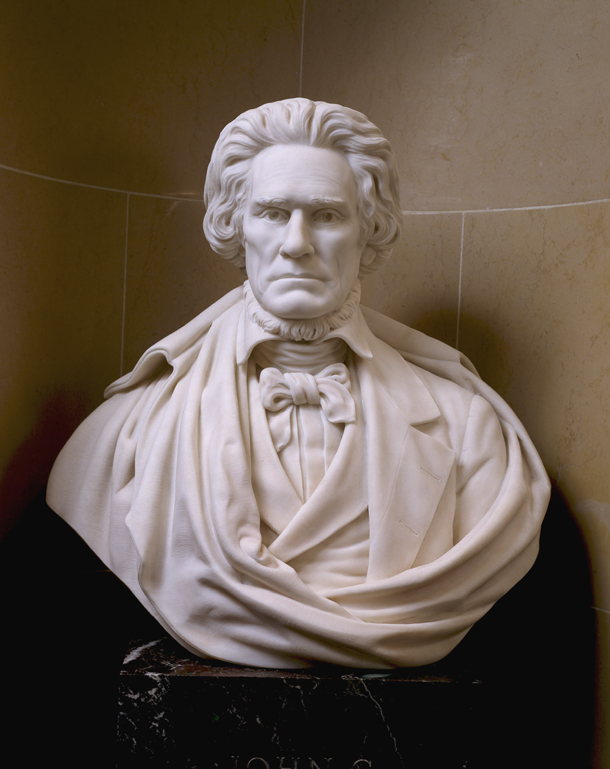
President of the Senate John C. Calhoun.

	Party (shading shows control)			Total	Vacant
	National Republican (NR)	Jacksonian (J)	Other	Total	Vacant
End of previous congress	21	27	0	48	0
Begin	22	26	0	48	0
End	22	25	0	47	1
Final voting share	46.8%	53.2%	0.0%		
Beginning of next congress	21	24	2 (Note: Nullifier)	47	1

=== House of Representatives ===
	Party (shading shows control)				Total	Vacant
	National Republican (NR)	Anti- Masonic (AM)	Jacksonian (J)	Other (0)	Total	Vacant
End of previous congress	101	0	111	0	212	1
Begin	72	4	133	0	209	4
End	72	5	135	0	212	1
Final voting share	34.0%	2.4%	63.7%	0.0%		
Beginning of next congress	64	16	128	4 (Note: Nullifier)	212	1

== Leadership ==
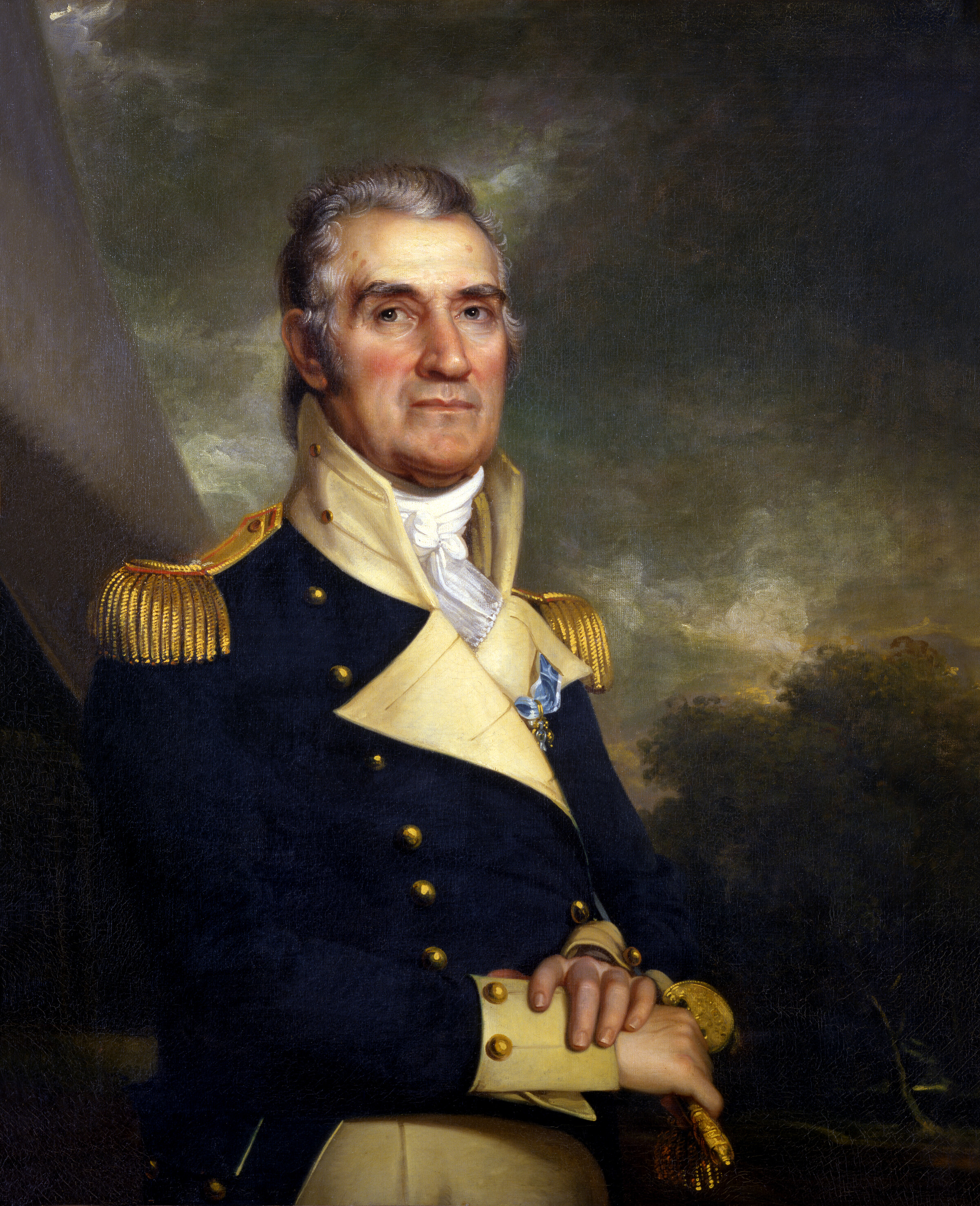
President pro tempore Samuel Smith.

=== Senate ===
- President: John C. Calhoun (J)
- President pro tempore: Samuel Smith (J)

=== House of Representatives ===
- Speaker: Andrew Stevenson (J)

== Members ==
This list is arranged by chamber, then by state. Senators are listed by class, and representatives are listed by district.

Skip to House of Representatives, below

=== Senate ===
Senators were elected by the state legislatures every two years, with one-third beginning new six-year terms with each Congress. Preceding the names in the list below are Senate class numbers, which indicate the cycle of their election. In this Congress, Class 1 meant their term began in the last Congress, facing re-election in 1832; Class 2 meant their term began with this Congress, facing re-election in 1834; and Class 3 meant their term ended with this Congress, facing re-election in 1830.

==== Alabama ====
▌2. William R. King (J)
▌3. John McKinley (J)

==== Connecticut ====
▌1. Samuel A. Foot (NR)
▌3. Calvin Willey (NR)

==== Delaware ====
▌1. Louis McLane (J), until April 16, 1829

▌Arnold Naudain (NR), from January 7, 1830

▌2. John M. Clayton (NR)

==== Georgia ====
▌2. George M. Troup (J)
▌3. John Macpherson Berrien (J), until March 9, 1829

▌John Forsyth (J), from November 9, 1829

==== Illinois ====
▌2. John McLean (J), until October 14, 1830

▌David J. Baker (J), November 12, 1830 – December 11, 1830
▌John M. Robinson (J), from December 11, 1830

▌3. Elias Kane (J)

==== Indiana ====
▌1. James Noble (NR), until February 26, 1831, vacant for remainder of term
▌3. William Hendricks (NR)

==== Kentucky ====
▌2. George M. Bibb (J)
▌3. John Rowan (J)

==== Louisiana ====
▌2. Edward Livingston (J)
▌3. Josiah S. Johnston (NR)

==== Maine ====
▌1. John Holmes (NR)
▌2. Peleg Sprague (NR)

==== Maryland ====
▌1. Samuel Smith (J)
▌3. Ezekiel F. Chambers (NR)

==== Massachusetts ====
▌1. Daniel Webster (NR)
▌2. Nathaniel Silsbee (NR)

==== Mississippi ====
▌1. Powhatan Ellis (J)
▌2. Thomas Buck Reed (J), until November 26, 1829

▌Robert H. Adams (J), January 6, 1830 – July 2, 1830
▌George Poindexter (J), from October 15, 1830

==== Missouri ====
▌1. Thomas H. Benton (J)
▌3. David Barton (NR)

==== New Hampshire ====
▌2. Samuel Bell (NR)
▌3. Levi Woodbury (J)

==== New Jersey ====
▌1. Mahlon Dickerson (J)
▌2. Theodore Frelinghuysen (NR)

==== New York ====
▌1. Charles E. Dudley (J)
▌3. Nathan Sanford (NR)

==== North Carolina ====
▌2. John Branch (J), until March 9, 1829

▌Bedford Brown (J), from December 9, 1829

▌3. James Iredell Jr. (J)

==== Ohio ====
▌1. Benjamin Ruggles (NR)
▌3. Jacob Burnet (NR)

==== Pennsylvania ====
▌1. Isaac D. Barnard (J)
▌3. William Marks (NR)

==== Rhode Island ====
▌1. Asher Robbins (NR)
▌2. Nehemiah R. Knight (NR)

==== South Carolina ====
▌2. Robert Y. Hayne (J)
▌3. William Smith (J)

==== Tennessee ====
▌1. John H. Eaton (J), until March 9, 1829

▌Felix Grundy (J), from October 19, 1829

▌2. Hugh Lawson White (J)

==== Vermont ====
▌1. Horatio Seymour (NR)
▌3. Dudley Chase (NR)

==== Virginia ====
▌1. John Tyler (J)
▌2. Littleton Waller Tazewell (J)

Senators' party membership by state at the opening of the 21st Congress in March 1829. 2 Jacksonians 1 Jacksonian and 1 Anti-Jacksonian 2 Anti-Jacksonians

=== House of Representatives ===
Representatives are listed by their districts.

==== Alabama ====
▌1. Clement Comer Clay (J)
▌2. R. E. B. Baylor (J)
▌3. Dixon H. Lewis (J)

==== Connecticut ====
All representatives were elected statewide on a general ticket.

▌At-large. Noyes Barber (NR)
▌At-large. William W. Ellsworth (NR)
▌At-large. Jabez W. Huntington (NR)
▌At-large. Ralph I. Ingersoll (NR)
▌At-large. William L. Storrs (NR)
▌At-large. Ebenezer Young (NR)

==== Delaware ====
▌At-large. Kensey Johns Jr. (NR)

==== Georgia ====
All representatives were elected statewide on a general ticket.

▌At-large. Thomas F. Foster (J)
▌At-large. Charles E. Haynes (J)
▌At-large. Henry G. Lamar (J), from December 7, 1829
▌At-large. Wilson Lumpkin (J)
▌At-large. Wiley Thompson (J)
▌At-large. James M. Wayne (J)
▌At-large. Richard Henry Wilde (J)

==== Illinois ====
▌At-large. Joseph Duncan (J)

==== Indiana ====
▌1. Ratliff Boon (J)
▌2. Jonathan Jennings (NR)
▌3. John Test (NR)

==== Kentucky ====
▌1. Henry Daniel (J)
▌2. Nicholas D. Coleman (J)
▌3. James Clark (NR)
▌4. Robert P. Letcher (NR)
▌5. Richard Mentor Johnson (J)
▌6. Joseph Lecompte (J)
▌7. John Kincaid (J)
▌8. Nathan Gaither (J)
▌9. Charles A. Wickliffe (J)
▌10. Joel Yancey (J)
▌11. Thomas Chilton (J)
▌12. Chittenden Lyon (J)

==== Louisiana ====
▌1. Edward D. White Sr. (NR)
▌2. Henry H. Gurley (NR)
▌3. Walter Hampden Overton (J)

==== Maine ====
▌1. Rufus McIntire (J)
▌2. John Anderson (J)
▌3. Joseph F. Wingate (NR)
▌4. George Evans (NR), from July 20, 1829
▌5. James W. Ripley (J), until March 12, 1830

▌Cornelius Holland (J), from December 6, 1830

▌6. Leonard Jarvis (J)
▌7. Samuel Butman (NR)

==== Maryland ====
The 5th district was a plural district with two representatives.

▌1. Clement Dorsey (NR)
▌2. Benedict Joseph Semmes (NR)
▌3. George C. Washington (NR)
▌4. Michael C. Sprigg (J)
▌5. Elias Brown (J)
▌5. Benjamin Chew Howard (J)
▌6. George Edward Mitchell (J), from December 7, 1829
▌7. Richard Spencer (J)
▌8. Ephraim King Wilson (J)

==== Massachusetts ====
▌1. Benjamin Gorham (NR)
▌2. Benjamin Williams Crowninshield (NR)
▌3. John Varnum (NR)
▌4. Edward Everett (NR)
▌5. John Davis (NR)
▌6. Joseph G. Kendall (NR)
▌7. George Grennell Jr. (NR)
▌8. Isaac C. Bates (NR)
▌9. Henry W. Dwight (NR)
▌10. John Bailey (NR)
▌11. Joseph Richardson (NR)
▌12. James L. Hodges (NR)
▌13. John Reed Jr. (NR)

==== Mississippi ====
▌At-large. Thomas Hinds (J)

==== Missouri ====
▌At-large. Spencer Pettis (J)

==== New Hampshire ====
All representatives were elected statewide on a general ticket.

▌At-large. John Brodhead (J)
▌At-large. Thomas Chandler (J)
▌At-large. Joseph Hammons (J)
▌At-large. Jonathan Harvey (J)
▌At-large. Henry Hubbard (J)
▌At-large. John W. Weeks (J)

==== New Jersey ====
All representatives were elected statewide on a general ticket.

▌At-large. Lewis Condict (NR)
▌At-large. Richard M. Cooper (NR)
▌At-large. Thomas H. Hughes (NR)
▌At-large. Isaac Pierson (NR)
▌At-large. James F. Randolph (NR)
▌At-large. Samuel Swan (NR)

==== New York ====
There were three plural districts: the 20th and 26th had two representatives each, the 3rd had three representatives.

▌1. James Lent (J)
▌2. Jacob Crocheron (J)
▌3. Churchill C. Cambreleng (J)
▌3. Gulian C. Verplanck (J)
▌3. Campbell P. White (J)
▌4. Henry B. Cowles (NR)
▌5. Abraham Bockee (J)
▌6. Hector Craig (J), until July 12, 1830

▌Samuel W. Eager (NR), from November 2, 1830

▌7. Charles G. DeWitt (J)
▌8. James Strong (NR)
▌9. John D. Dickinson (NR)
▌10. Ambrose Spencer (NR)
▌11. Perkins King (J)
▌12. Peter I. Borst (J)
▌13. William G. Angel (J)
▌14. Henry R. Storrs (NR)
▌15. Michael Hoffman (J)
▌16. Benedict Arnold (NR)
▌17. John W. Taylor (NR)
▌18. Henry C. Martindale (NR)
▌19. Isaac Finch (NR)
▌20. Joseph Hawkins (NR)
▌20. George Fisher (NR), until February 5, 1830

▌Jonah Sanford (J), from November 3, 1830

▌21. Robert Monell (J), until February 21, 1831, vacant thereafter
▌22. Thomas Beekman (NR)
▌23. Jonas Earll Jr. (J)
▌24. Gershom Powers (J)
▌25. Thomas Maxwell (J)
▌26. Jehiel H. Halsey (J)
▌26. Robert S. Rose (Anti-M)
▌27. Timothy Childs (Anti-M)
▌28. John Magee (J)
▌29. Phineas L. Tracy (Anti-M)
▌30. Ebenezer F. Norton (J)

==== North Carolina ====
▌1. William Biddle Shepard (NR)
▌2. Willis Alston (J)
▌3. Thomas H. Hall (J)
▌4. Jesse Speight (J)
▌5. Gabriel Holmes (J), until September 26, 1829

▌Edward B. Dudley (J), from November 10, 1829

▌6. Robert Potter (J)
▌7. Edmund Deberry (NR)
▌8. Daniel Laurens Barringer (J)
▌9. Augustine Henry Shepperd (J)
▌10. Abraham Rencher (J)
▌11. Henry William Connor (J)
▌12. Samuel Price Carson (J)
▌13. Lewis Williams (NR)

==== Ohio ====
▌1. James Findlay (J)
▌2. James Shields (J)
▌3. Joseph H. Crane (NR)
▌4. Joseph Vance (NR)
▌5. William Russell (J)
▌6. William Creighton Jr. (NR)
▌7. Samuel F. Vinton (NR)
▌8. William Stanbery (J)
▌9. William W. Irvin (J)
▌10. William Kennon Sr. (J)
▌11. John M. Goodenow (J), until April 9, 1830

▌Humphrey H. Leavitt (J), from December 6, 1830

▌12. John Thomson (J)
▌13. Elisha Whittlesey (NR)
▌14. Mordecai Bartley (NR)

==== Pennsylvania ====
There were six plural districts, the 7th, 8th, 11th & 16th had two representatives each, the 4th & 9th had three representatives each.

▌1. Joel B. Sutherland (J)
▌2. Joseph Hemphill (J)
▌3. Daniel H. Miller (J)
▌4. James Buchanan (J)
▌4. Joshua Evans Jr. (J)
▌4. George Gray Leiper (J)
▌5. John B. Sterigere (J)
▌6. Innis Green (J)
▌7. Joseph Fry Jr. (J)
▌7. Henry A. P. Muhlenberg (J)
▌8. Samuel D. Ingham (J), until March 1829

▌Peter Ihrie Jr. (J), from October 13, 1829

▌8. George Wolf (J), until March 1829

▌Samuel A. Smith (J), from October 13, 1829

▌9. James Ford (J)
▌9. Alem Marr (J)
▌9. Philander Stephens (J)
▌10. Adam King (J)
▌11. Thomas Hartley Crawford (J)
▌11. William Ramsey (J)
▌12. John Scott (J)
▌13. Chauncey Forward (J)
▌14. Thomas Irwin (J)
▌15. William McCreery (J)
▌16. Harmar Denny (Anti-M), from December 15, 1829, after William Wilkins resigned before qualifying
▌16. John Gilmore (J)
▌17. Richard Coulter (J)
▌18. Thomas H. Sill (NR)

==== Rhode Island ====
Both representatives were elected statewide on a general ticket.

▌At-large. Tristam Burges (NR)
▌At-large. Dutee J. Pearce (NR)

==== South Carolina ====
▌1. William Drayton (J)
▌2. Robert Woodward Barnwell (J)
▌3. John Campbell (J)
▌4. William D. Martin (J)
▌5. George McDuffie (J)
▌6. Warren R. Davis (J)
▌7. William T. Nuckolls (J)
▌8. James Blair (J)
▌9. Starling Tucker (J)

==== Tennessee ====
▌1. John Blair (J)
▌2. Pryor Lea (J)
▌3. James Israel Standifer (J)
▌4. Jacob C. Isacks (J)
▌5. Robert Desha (J)
▌6. James K. Polk (J)
▌7. John Bell (J)
▌8. Cave Johnson (J)
▌9. Davy Crockett (NR)

==== Vermont ====
▌1. Jonathan Hunt (NR)
▌2. Rollin C. Mallary (NR)
▌3. Horace Everett (NR)
▌4. Benjamin Swift (NR)
▌5. William Cahoon (Anti-M)

==== Virginia ====
▌1. Thomas Newton Jr. (NR), until March 9, 1830

▌George Loyall (J), from March 9, 1830

▌2. James Trezvant (J)
▌3. William S. Archer (J)
▌4. Mark Alexander (J)
▌5. Thomas T. Bouldin (J)
▌6. Thomas Davenport (J)
▌7. Nathaniel Claiborne (J)
▌8. Richard Coke Jr. (J)
▌9. Andrew Stevenson (J)
▌10. William Cabell Rives (J), until April 17, 1829

▌William F. Gordon (J), from January 25, 1830

▌11. Philip P. Barbour (J), until October 15, 1830

▌John M. Patton (J), from November 25, 1830

▌12. John Roane (J)
▌13. John Taliaferro (NR)
▌14. Charles F. Mercer (NR)
▌15. John S. Barbour (J)
▌16. William Armstrong (NR)
▌17. Robert Allen (J)
▌18. Philip Doddridge (NR)
▌19. William McCoy (J)
▌20. Robert Craig (J)
▌21. Lewis Maxwell (NR)
▌22. Alexander Smyth (J), until April 17, 1830

▌Joseph Draper (J), from December 6, 1830

==== Non-voting members ====
Arkansas Territory. Ambrose H. Sevier
Florida Territory. Joseph M. White
Michigan Territory. John Biddle, until February 21, 1831, vacant thereafter

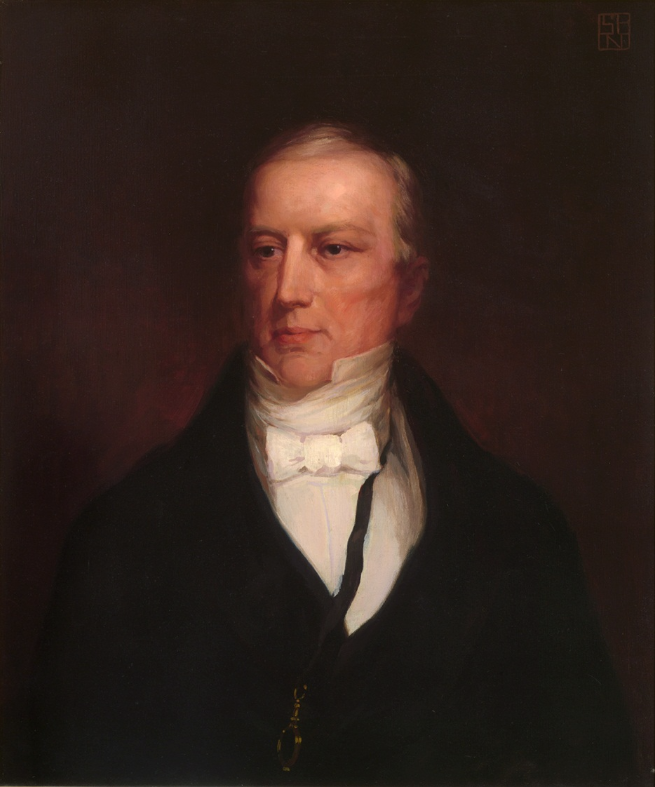
Speaker of the House Andrew Stevenson.

== Changes in membership ==
The count below reflects changes from the beginning of the first session of this Congress.

=== Senate ===
- Replacements: 4
  - Jacksonians (J): no net change
  - National Republicans (NR): no net change
- Deaths: 4
- Resignations: 4
- Interim appointments: 1
- Total seats with changes: 7

Senate changes
State (class)	Vacated by	Reason for change	Successor	Date of successor's formal installation (Note: When seated or oath administered, not necessarily when service began.)
Georgia (3)	John M. Berrien (J)	Resigned March 9, 1829, to become U.S. Attorney General. Successor elected November 9, 1829.	John Forsyth (J)	Installed November 9, 1829
North Carolina (2)	John Branch (J)	Resigned March 9, 1829, after being appointed U.S. Secretary of the Navy. Successor elected December 9, 1829.	Bedford Brown (J)	Installed December 9, 1829
Tennessee (1)	John Eaton (J)	Resigned March 9, 1829, after being appointed U.S. Secretary of War. Successor elected October 19, 1829.	Felix Grundy (J)	Installed October 19, 1829
Delaware (1)	Louis McLane (J)	Resigned April 29, 1829, to become U.S. Envoy Extraordinary and Minister Plenipotentiary to the United Kingdom. Successor elected January 7, 1830.	Arnold Naudain (NR)	Installed January 7, 1830
Mississippi (2)	Thomas B. Reed (J)	Died November 26, 1829. Successor elected January 6, 1830.	Robert H. Adams (J)	Installed January 6, 1830
Mississippi (2)	Robert H. Adams (J)	Died July 2, 1830. Successor appointed October 15, 1830, to continue the term, and subsequently elected.	George Poindexter (J)	Installed October 15, 1830
Illinois (2)	John McLean (J)	Died October 14, 1830. Successor appointed November 12, 1830, to continue the term.	David J. Baker (J)	Installed November 12, 1830
Illinois (2)	David J. Baker (J)	Appointee retired with elected successor qualified. Successor elected December 11, 1830.	John M. Robinson (J)	Installed December 11, 1830
Indiana (1)	James Noble (NR)	Died February 26, 1831. Seat filled next Congress.	Vacant	Not filled this Congress

=== House of Representatives ===
- Replacements: 5
  - Jacksonians (J): 1 seat net loss
  - National Republicans (NR): 1 seat net gain
- Deaths: 2
- Resignations: 10
- Contested election: 2

Total seats with changes: 15

House changes
District	Vacated by	Reason for change	Successor	Date of successor's formal installation
Maryland; 6th	Vacant	Maryland elected its members October 5, 1829, after the term began but before Congress convened. Rep-elect sworn in December after convening.	George Edward Mitchell (J)	Seated December 7, 1829
Georgia at-large	Vacant	George Gilmer (Jacksonian) was redistricted from the 1st district and re-elected but failed to accept the position within the legal time frame. Governor ordered a new election.	Henry G. Lamar (J)	Seated December 7, 1829
Maine; 4th	Vacant	Peleg Sprague resigned in previous Congress	George Evans (NR)	Seated July 20, 1829
Pennsylvania; 16th	Vacant	William Wilkins resigned before qualifying	Harmar Denny (AM)	Seated December 15, 1829
Pennsylvania; 8th	George Wolf (J)	Resigned in 1829 before the convening of Congress	Samuel A. Smith (J)	Seated October 13, 1829
Virginia; 10th	William Cabell Rives (J)	Resigned some time in 1829	William F. Gordon (J)	Seated January 25, 1830
Pennsylvania; 8th	Samuel D. Ingham (J)	Resigned in March 1829 after being appointed Secretary of the Treasury	Peter Ihrie Jr. (J)	Seated October 13, 1829
North Carolina; 5th	Gabriel Holmes (J)	Died September 26, 1829	Edward Bishop Dudley (J)	Seated November 10, 1829
New York; 20th	George Fisher (NR)	Lost contested election February 5, 1830, to Silas Wright who in turn failed to qualify	Jonah Sanford (J)	Seated November 3, 1830
Virginia; 1st	Thomas Newton Jr. (NR)	Lost contested election March 9, 1830	George Loyall (J)	Seated March 9, 1830
Maine; 5th	James W. Ripley (J)	Resigned March 12, 1830	Cornelius Holland (J)	Seated December 6, 1830
Ohio; 11th	John M. Goodenow (J)	Resigned April 9, 1830, after being appointed judge of the Supreme Court of Ohio	Humphrey H. Leavitt (J)	Seated December 6, 1830
Virginia; 22nd	Alexander Smyth (J)	Died April 17, 1830	Joseph Draper (J)	Seated December 6, 1830
New York; 6th	Hector Craig (J)	Resigned July 12, 1830	Samuel W. Eager (NR)	Seated November 2, 1830
Virginia; 11th	Philip P. Barbour (J)	Resigned October 15, 1830, after being appointed judge of U.S. Circuit Court of the Eastern District of Virginia	John M. Patton (J)	Seated November 25, 1830
New York; 21st	Robert Monell (J)	Resigned February 21, 1831	Vacant	Not filled this term
Michigan Territory; At-large	John Biddle	Resigned February 21, 1831	Vacant	Not filled this term

== Committees ==
Lists of committees and their party leaders.

=== Senate ===
- Accounts of James Monroe (Select)
- Agriculture (Chairman: William Marks)
- Amending the Constitution on the Election of the President and Vice President (Select)
- Audit and Control the Contingent Expenses of the Senate (Chairman: Elias Kane then James Iredell Jr.)
- Claims (Chairman: Benjamin Ruggles)
- Commerce (Chairman: Levi Woodbury)
- Distributing Public Revenue Among the States (Select)
- District of Columbia (Chairman: Ezekiel F. Chambers)
- Dueling (Select)
- Engrossed Bills (Chairman: William Marks)
- Finance (Chairman: Samuel Smith)
- Foreign Relations (Chairman: Littleton Tazewell)
- French Spoilations (Select)
- Impeachment of James H. Peck (Select)
- Indian Affairs (Chairman: Hugh Lawson White)
- Judiciary (Chairman: John Rowan)
- Manufactures (Chairman: Mahlon Dickerson)
- Memorial of the Manufacturers Iron (Select)
- Mileage of Members of Congress (Select)
- Military Affairs (Chairman: Thomas Hart Benton)
- Militia (Chairman: Isaac D. Barnard)
- Naval Affairs (Chairman: Robert Y. Hayne)
- Nomination of Amos Kendall (Select)
- Pensions (Chairman: John Holmes)
- Post Office Department (Select)
- Post Office and Post Roads (Chairman: George M. Bibb)
- Private Land Claims (Chairman: Jacob Burnet)
- Public Lands (Chairman: David Barton)
- Roads and Canals (Select) (Chairman: William Hendricks)
- Tariff Regulation (Select)
- Whole

=== House of Representatives ===
- Accounts (Chairman: Jehiel H. Halsey)
- Agriculture (Chairman: Ambrose Spencer)
- American Colonization Society (Select)
- Claims (Chairman: Elisha Whittlesey)
- Commerce (Chairman: Churchill C. Cambreleng)
- District of Columbia (Chairman: Gershom Powers)
- Elections (Chairman: Willis Alston)
- Establishing an Assay Office in the Gold Region (Select)
- Expenditures in the Navy Department (Chairman: Augustine H. Shepperd)
- Expenditures in the Post Office Department (Chairman: Joel Yancey)
- Expenditures in the State Department (Chairman: Jonas Earll)
- Expenditures in the Treasury Department (Chairman: George G. Leiper)
- Expenditures in the War Department (Chairman: Lewis Maxwell)
- Expenditures on Public Buildings (Chairman: Michael C. Sprigg)
- Foreign Affairs (Chairman: William S. Archer)
- Indian Affairs (Chairman: John Bell)
- Judiciary (Chairman: James Buchanan)
- Manufactures (Chairman: Rollin C. Mallary)
- Military Affairs (Chairman: William Drayton)
- Military Pensions (Chairman: Isaac C. Bates)
- Naval Affairs (Chairman: Michael Hoffman)
- Post Office and Post Roads (Chairman: Richard M. Johnson)
- Private Land Claims (Chairman: John B. Sterigere)
- Public Expenditures (Chairman: Thomas H. Hall)
- Public Lands (Chairman: Jacob C. Isacks then Charles A. Wickliffe)
- Revisal and Unfinished Business (Chairman: Dutee J. Pearce)
- Revolutionary Claims (Chairman: Tristam Burges)
- Revolutionary Pensions (Chairman: N/A)
- Rules (Select)
- Standards of Official Conduct
- Territories (Chairman: James Clark)
- Ways and Means (Chairman: George McDuffie)
- Whole

=== Joint committees ===
- Enrolled Bills
- The Library

== Employees ==
=== Legislative branch agency directors ===
- Architect of the Capitol: Charles Bulfinch, until June 25, 1829 (office abolished)
- Librarian of Congress: John Silva Meehan

=== Senate ===
- Chaplain: William Ryland (Methodist), until December 14, 1829
  - Henry V. Johns (Episcopalian), elected December 14, 1829
- Secretary: Walter Lowrie
- Sergeant at Arms: Mountjoy Bayly

=== House of Representatives ===
- Chaplain: Reuben Post (Presbyterian), until December 13, 1830
  - Ralph R. Gurley (Presbyterian), elected December 13, 1830
- Clerk: Matthew St. Clair Clarke
- Doorkeeper: Benjamin Birch
- Sergeant at Arms: John O. Dunn

== See also ==
- 1828 United States elections (elections leading to this Congress)
  - 1828 United States presidential election
  - 1828–29 United States Senate elections
  - 1828–29 United States House of Representatives elections
- 1830 United States elections (elections during this Congress, leading to the next Congress)
  - 1830–31 United States Senate elections
  - 1830–31 United States House of Representatives elections
