= 1822 United States House of Representatives elections in New York =

- November 4–6, 1822

All 34 New York seats to the United States House of Representatives
	Majority party	Minority party
Party	Democratic-Republican	Federalist
Last election	19	8
Seats won	30	4
Seat change	▲11	▼4

The 1822 United States House of Representatives elections in New York were held from November 4 to 6, 1822, to elect 34 U.S. Representatives to represent the State of New York in the United States House of Representatives of the 18th United States Congress.

== Background ==
27 U.S. Representatives had been elected in April 1821 to a term in the 17th United States Congress which had begun on March 4, 1821. Selah Tuthill died on September 7, 1821, before Congress met, and Charles Borland, Jr. had been elected to fill the vacancy. Solomon Van Rensselaer resigned his seat in January 1822, and Stephen Van Rensselaer had been elected to fill the vacancy. The representatives' term would end on March 3, 1823. Most previous congressional elections in New York had been held together with the annual State elections in late April, but under the New York Constitution of 1821, the elections were moved permanently to November: about four months before the congressional term began, and a little more than a year before Congress actually met on December 1, 1823.

At this time the Democratic-Republican Party in New York was split into two opposing factions: on one side, the supporters of DeWitt Clinton and his Erie Canal project; on the other side, the Bucktails (including the Tammany Hall organization in New York City), led by Martin Van Buren. At the same time, the Federalist Party had already disbanded, and most of its former members had joined the Clintonians.

== Congressional districts ==
On April 17, 1822, the New York State Legislature re-apportioned the congressional districts according to the figures of the 1820 United States census. The number of district was increased to 30, creating eight new districts; the number of seats was increased to 34, creating for the first time a triple-seat district, and keeping two double-seat districts.

- The 1st District comprising Queens and Suffolk counties.
- The 2nd District comprising Kings, Richmond and Rockland counties.
- The 3rd District (three seats) comprising New York County.
- The 4th District comprising Westchester and Putnam counties.
- The 5th District comprising Dutchess County.
- The 6th District comprising Orange County.
- The 7th District comprising Ulster and Sullivan counties.
- The 8th District comprising Columbia County.
- The 9th District comprising Rensselaer County.
- The 10th District comprising Albany County.
- The 11th District comprising Delaware and Greene counties.
- The 12th District comprising Schenectady and Schoharie counties.
- The 13th District comprising Otsego County.
- The 14th District comprising Oneida County.
- The 15th District comprising Herkimer County.
- The 16th District comprising Montgomery County.
- The 17th District comprising Saratoga County.
- The 18th District comprising Washington County.
- The 19th District comprising Clinton, Essex, Franklin and Warren counties.
- The 20th District (two seats) comprising St. Lawrence, Jefferson, Lewis and Oswego counties.
- The 21st District comprising Chenango and Broome counties.
- The 22nd District comprising Madison and Cortland counties.
- The 23rd District comprising Onondaga County.
- The 24th District comprising Cayuga County.
- The 25th District comprising Tioga and Tompkins counties.
- The 26th District (two seats) comprising Ontario and Seneca counties.
- The 27th District comprising Monroe and Livingston counties.
- The 28th District comprising Steuben, Allegany and Cattaraugus counties.
- The 29th District comprising Genesee County.
- The 30th District comprising Niagara, Chautauqua and Erie counties.

Note: There are now 62 counties in the State of New York. The counties which are not mentioned in this list had not yet been established, or sufficiently organized, the area being included in one or more of the abovementioned counties.

== Result ==
23 Bucktails and 11 Clintonian/Federalists were declared elected. The incumbents Wood, Morgan, Cambreleng, Van Wyck, Van Rensselaer, Taylor, Litchfield, Rochester and Tracy were re-elected; the incumbents Ruggles, Dickinson, Campbell and Woodcock were defeated.

1822 United States House election result
District	Democratic-Republican/Bucktails		Clintonian/Federalist		also ran	
1st	John P. Osborn	1,353	Silas Wood	1,383		
2nd	Jacob Tyson	1,754			Jacob Patchen	174
3rd	John J. Morgan	4,428				
3rd	Churchill C. Cambreleng	4,389				
3rd	Peter Sharpe	4,199				
4th	Joel Frost	2,214	Abraham Smith	678	Peter A. Jay (Fed.)	333
5th	William W. Van Wyck	3,119	Derick B. Stockholm	1,265		
6th	Charles Ludlow	1,617	Hector Craig	2,191		
7th	Lemuel Jenkins	2,864	Charles H. Ruggles	2,153		
8th	Joseph D. Monell	1,940	James Strong	2,647		
9th	James L. Hogeboom	3,241	John D. Dickinson	2,859		
10th			Stephen Van Rensselaer	2,725		
11th	Charles A. Foote	3,184	John T. More	2,698		
12th	Lewis Eaton	2,800	Nicholas F. Beck	1,549		
13th	Isaac Williams, Jr.	2,343				
14th	Ezekiel Bacon	2,632	Henry R. Storrs	2,687		
15th	John Herkimer	2,050	Simeon Ford	1,390		
16th	Alexander Sheldon	2,148	John W. Cady	2,215		
17th	George Palmer	2,115	John W. Taylor	2,505		
18th	Henry C. Martindale	2,424	David Russell	1,979		
19th	John Richards	2,234	Ezra C. Gross	1,962		
20th	Egbert Ten Eyck	6,455				
20th	Ela Collins	6,407				
21st	Lot Clark	2,265	Samuel Campbell	821		
22nd	Justin Dwinell	2,911				
23rd	Elisha Litchfield	2,042	Asa Wells	1,387		
24th	Rowland Day	2,622	Jonathan Richmond	1,804		
25th	David Woodcock	2,215	Samuel Lawrence	2,449		
26th	Micah Brooks	1,418	Dudley Marvin	4,511	John Price (C/F)	1,866
26th	Robert S. Rose	3,046	William Thompson	2,563		
27th	John H. Jones	2,023	Moses Hayden	3,117		
28th	William B. Rochester	3,426				
29th	Isaac Wilson	2,093	Parmenio Adams	2,077		
30th	Augustus Porter	2,091	Albert H. Tracy	3,516		

Note: In Congress both Bucktails and Clintonians aligned with the Democratic-Republicans from the other States. Of the Anti-Bucktails Wood, Ruggles, Strong, Dickinson, Van Rensselaer, Storrs and Russell were old Federalists; Stockholm, Craig, Beck, Cady, Taylor, Gross, Richmond, Lawrence, Marvin, Thompson, Hayden, Adams and Tracy were Clintonians.

== Aftermath, special election and contested election ==
William B. Rochester, re-elected in the 28th District, was appointed Judge of the Eighth Circuit Court on April 21, 1823, and resigned his seat before Congress met. A special election to fill the vacancy was held, and was won by William Woods, of the same faction.

1823 United States House special election result
District	D-R/Bucktail		D-R/Clintonian	
28th	William Woods	834	Daniel Cruger	789

The House of Representatives of the 18th United States Congress met for the first time at the United States Capitol in Washington, D.C., on December 1, 1823, and 30 of the representatives, among them Isaac Wilson and William Woods, took their seats on this day. Lawrence took his seat on December 5; Herkimer on December 8; Tracy on December 16; and Morgan on December 18.

A petition on behalf of Parmenio Adams was presented to contest the election of Isaac Wilson in the 29th District. On December 30, 1823, the Committee on Elections submitted its report. They found that in the town of China by mistake 67 votes had been returned for Wilson, although he had polled only 45. They also found that in the town of Attica by mistake 98 votes had been returned for Adams, although he had polled only 93. The Secretary of State of New York, receiving the abovementioned result, issued credentials for Wilson who took his seat when Congress met on December 1. Correcting the mistakes in the China and Attica returns, Adams had 2,072 and Wilson 2,071 votes. Wilson also claimed that he had received 1 vote in Middlebury which was counted as a "blank vote" by the election inspectors because the name printed on the ballot was "partially erased with the stroke of a pen," and that he had received 2 votes in the Town of Stafford and 4 votes in the Town of Byron which were not counted by the election inspectors because the ballots were folded together in pairs. The committee upheld the decision of the election inspectors in both cases, and declared Adams entitled to the seat, winning the election by a single vote. On January 7, 1824, after much debate, the House declared Parmenio Adams entitled to the seat instead of Wilson, and Adams took it.

During this congressional term party lines broke down while four candidates lined up to succeed President James Monroe. At the 1824 United States presidential election, John Quincy Adams, Andrew Jackson, Henry Clay and William H. Crawford received electoral votes, but no candidate received a majority. Thus the election was referred to the House of Representatives, to choose among the three most voted candidates: Adams, Jackson and Crawford. Henry Clay supported Adams, so that after the election on February 9, 1825, one month before the end of the term, the members were back-labeled (according to their actual vote) as "Adams-Clay Democratic-Republicans" (Sharpe, Van Wyck, Williams, Herkimer, Cady, Taylor, Martindale, Lawrence, Marvin, Rose, Hayden, Woods, Adams and Tracy), "Jackson Democratic-Republicans" (Morgan and Craig), "Crawford Democratic-Republicans" (Tyson, Cambreleng, Frost, Jenkins, Hoogeboom, Foote, Eaton, Richards, Ten Eyck, Collins, Clark, Dwinell, Litchfield, Day) and "Adams-Clay Federalists" (Wood, Strong, Van Rensselaer, Storrs).

== See also ==
- 1822 and 1823 United States House of Representatives elections

== Sources ==
- The New York Civil List compiled in 1858 (see: pg. 66 for district apportionment; pg. 71 for Congressmen)
- Members of the Eighteenth United States Congress
- Election result 1st D. at project "A New Nation Votes", compiled by Phil Lampi, hosted by Tufts University Digital Library
- Election result 2nd D. at "A New Nation Votes"
- Election result 3rd D. at "A New Nation Votes"
- Election result 4th D. at "A New Nation Votes"
- Election result 5th D. at "A New Nation Votes"
- Election result 6th D. at "A New Nation Votes"
- Election result 7th D. at "A New Nation Votes"
- Election result 8th D. at "A New Nation Votes"
- Election result 9th D. at "A New Nation Votes"
- Election result 10th D. at "A New Nation Votes"
- Election result 11th D. at "A New Nation Votes"
- Election result 12th D. at "A New Nation Votes"
- Election result 13th D. at "A New Nation Votes"
- Election result 14th D. at "A New Nation Votes"
- Election result 15th D. at "A New Nation Votes"
- Election result 16th D. at "A New Nation Votes"
- Election result 17th D. at "A New Nation Votes"
- Election result 18th D. at "A New Nation Votes"
- Election result 19th D. at "A New Nation Votes"
- Election result 20th D. at "A New Nation Votes"
- Election result 21st D. at "A New Nation Votes"
- Election result 22nd D. at "A New Nation Votes"
- Election result 23rd D. at "A New Nation Votes"
- Election result 24th D. at "A New Nation Votes"
- Election result 25th D. at "A New Nation Votes"
- Election result 26th D. at "A New Nation Votes"
- Election result 27th D. at "A New Nation Votes"
- Election result 28th D. at "A New Nation Votes"
- Election result 29th D. at "A New Nation Votes"
- Election result 30th D. at "A New Nation Votes"
- 1823 Special Election result 28th D. at "A New Nation Votes" [gives no returns from Steuben Co.]
