= John Whitehouse =

John Whitehouse may refer to:

- John O. Whitehouse (1817–1881), American congressman
- John Howard Whitehouse (1873–1955), founder of Bembridge School on the Isle of Wight
- John Whitehouse (footballer) (1878–?), English footballer
- Jack Whitehouse (footballer, born 1897) (John Charles Whitehouse 1897-1948), English footballer, see List of AFC Bournemouth players
- John Whitehouse (cricketer) (born 1949), English cricketer
- John Whitehouse (poet), poet from England, author of Ode to War

== See also ==
- Henry John Whitehouse (1803–1874), second Episcopal bishop of Illinois
