= New York's 6th congressional district =

U.S. House district for New York

- Interactive map of district boundaries since January 3, 2025
- Representative: Grace Meng; D–Queens
- Distribution: 100% urban; 0% rural
- Population (2025): 763,499
- Median household income: $82,778
- Ethnicity: 44.7% Asian; 24.8% Hispanic; 23.4% White; 3.8% Black; 2.2% Two or more races; 1.0% other
- Cook PVI: D+6

New York's 6th congressional district is a congressional district for the United States House of Representatives in New York City, located entirely within Queens. It is represented by Democrat Grace Meng. A plurality of the district's population is Asian-American and less than a quarter of the population is white.

The district includes several ethnically diverse Queens neighborhoods, including Auburndale, Bayside, East Elmhurst, Elmhurst, Flushing, Forest Hills, Glendale, Kew Gardens Hills, Maspeth, Middle Village, Murray Hill, Woodside and Rego Park. Prior to the 2022 election, the district was redrawn to include sections of Jackson Heights and Astoria which were previously part of NY-14.

In 2018, Chinese Americans made up 21.9% of the 6th district's population, the highest of any district in New York, and its Asian American population of 39.4% was similarly the highest out of New York's congressional seats.

In the 2024 election, Donald Trump came within 6% of winning this district, a swing of 23 points from the previous cycle.

== Voter registration ==
Voter registration and party enrollment as of February 20, 2025
Party	Active voters	Inactive voters	Total voters	Percentage
Democratic	201,544	13,441	214,985	54.53%
Republican	54,959	2,812	57,771	14.65%
Conservative	1,602	129	1,731	0.44%
Working Families	1,142	53	1,195	0.30%
Other	6,193	435	6,628	1.68%
Unaffiliated	106,384	5,585	111,969	28.40%
Total	371,824	22,455	394,279	100%

== Recent election results from statewide races ==
Year	Office	Results
2008	President	Obama 66% - 33%
2012	President	Obama 72% - 28%
2016	President	Clinton 68% - 28%
2016	Senate	Schumer 78% - 20%
2018	Senate	Gillibrand 75% - 25%
2018	Governor	Cuomo 72% - 25%
2018	Attorney General	James 73% - 25%
2020	President	Biden 64% - 35%
2022	Senate	Schumer 59% - 40%
2022	Governor	Hochul 54% - 46%
2022	Attorney General	James 56% - 44%
2022	Comptroller	DiNapoli 58% - 42%
2024	President	Harris 52% - 46%
2024	Senate	Gillibrand 57% - 42%

== History ==
1789–1913:

Parts of Manhattan

1913–1945:

Parts of Brooklyn

1945–1973:

Parts of Queens

1973–1983:

Parts of Nassau, Queens

1983–present:

Parts of Queens

Various New York districts have been numbered "6" over the years, including areas in New York City and various parts of upstate New York. From 2003–2013, the district included most of Southeastern Queens including the neighborhoods of Cambria Heights, Edgemere, Far Rockaway, Hollis, Jamaica, Laurelton, Queens Village, Rosedale, Saint Albans, Springfield Gardens, and South Ozone Park, as well as John F. Kennedy International Airport. The district comprised mainly middle-class minority communities, but also included a part of Howard Beach known as Old Howard Beach.

== Current composition ==
The 6th district is located entirely in the New York City borough of Queens. Queens neighborhoods in the district include:

- Auburndale
- Bayside
- Briarwood
- East Flushing
- Electchester
- Elmhurst
- Flushing
- Forest Hills
- Fresh Meadows
- Hillcrest
- Hollis Hills
- Jackson Heights
- Jamaica Hills
- Kew Gardens Hills
- Maspeth
- Middle Village
- Oakland Gardens
- Pomonok
- Queensboro Hill
- Rego Park
- Utopia
- Willets Point
- Woodside

== List of members representing the district ==
The 6th District was located in northern Queens and adjacent Nassau county until 1982, covering the same territory now in the 5th District. This part of Queens had been in the 7th District prior to that reapportionment.

=== 1789–1809: one seat ===
Cong ress	Years	Representative	Party	Electoral history
District established March 4, 1789
1st	March 4, 1789 – March 3, 1791	Jeremiah Van Rensselaer (Rensselaerswyck)	Anti- Administration	Elected in 1789. Lost re-election.
2nd	March 4, 1791 – March 3, 1793	James Gordon (Schenectady)	Pro- Administration	Elected in 1790. Redistricted to the 9th district.
3rd	March 4, 1793 – March 3, 1795	Ezekiel Gilbert (Hudson)	Pro- Administration	Elected in 1793. Re-elected in 1794. Retired.
4th	March 4, 1795 – March 3, 1797	Ezekiel Gilbert (Hudson)	Federalist	Elected in 1793. Re-elected in 1794. Retired.
5th	March 4, 1797 – March 3, 1799	Hezekiah L. Hosmer (Hudson)	Federalist	Re-elected in 1796. Retired.
6th 7th	March 4, 1799 – July 25, 1801	John Bird (Troy)	Federalist	Elected in 1798. Re-elected in 1800. Resigned.
7th	July 25, 1801 – October 6, 1801	Vacant		
7th	October 6, 1801 – January 17, 1803	John Peter Van Ness (Ghent)	Democratic- Republican	Elected to finish Bird's term. Seat declared forfeited from appointment as major of militia in the District of Columbia.
7th	January 17, 1803 – March 3, 1803	Vacant		
8th	March 4, 1803 – April 26, 1803	Isaac Bloom (Clinton)	Democratic- Republican	Elected in 1802. Died.
8th	April 26, 1803 – October 17, 1803	Vacant		
8th 9th 10th	October 17, 1803 – March 3, 1809	Daniel C. Verplanck (Fishkill)	Democratic- Republican	Elected to finish Bloom's term. Re-elected in 1804. Re-elected in 1806. Retired.

=== 1809–1813: two seats ===
From 1809 to 1813, two seats were elected at-large on a general ticket.

Cong ress	Years	Seat A			Seat B		
Cong ress	Years	Representative	Party	Electoral history	Representative	Party	Electoral history
11th	March 4, 1809 – March 3, 1811	Herman Knickerbocker (Schaghticoke)	Federalist	Elected in 1808. Retired.	Robert Le Roy Livingston (Hudson)	Federalist	Elected in 1808. Resigned.
12th	March 4, 1811 – May 6, 1812	Asa Fitch (Salem)	Federalist	Elected in 1810. Retired.	Robert Le Roy Livingston (Hudson)	Federalist	Elected in 1808. Resigned.
12th	May 6, 1812 – January 29, 1813	Asa Fitch (Salem)	Federalist	Elected in 1810. Retired.	Vacant		
12th	January 29, 1813 – March 3, 1813	Asa Fitch (Salem)	Federalist	Elected in 1810. Retired.	Thomas P. Grosvenor (Hudson)	Federalist	Elected to finish Livingston's term. Redistricted to the 5th district.

=== 1813–present: one seat ===
Member	Party	Years	Cong ress	Electoral history	Location
Jonathan Fisk (Newburgh)	Democratic- Republican	March 4, 1813 – March 21, 1815	13th 14th	Elected in 1812. Re-elected in 1814. Resigned to become U.S. Attorney for the Southern District of New York.	1813–1823; Orange County
Vacant		March 21, 1815 – December 4, 1815	14th		1813–1823; Orange County
James W. Wilkin (Goshen)	Democratic- Republican	December 4, 1815 – March 3, 1819	14th 15th	Elected April 1815 to finish Fisk's term and seated December 4, 1815. Re-elected in 1816. [data missing]	1813–1823; Orange County
Walter Case (Newbury)	Democratic- Republican	March 4, 1819 – March 3, 1821	16th	Elected in 1818. [data missing]	1813–1823; Orange County
Vacant		March 4, 1821 – December 3, 1821	17th	Selah Tuthill (DR) was elected late in April 1821 and died September 7, 1821. It is unclear if/when he received his credentials.	1813–1823; Orange County
Charles Borland Jr. (Wardsbridge)	Democratic- Republican	December 3, 1821 – March 3, 1823	17th	Elected November 8, 1821 to finish Tuthill's term and seated December 3, 1821. [data missing]	1813–1823; Orange County
Hector Craig (Chester)	Jacksonian; Democratic- Republican	March 4, 1823 – March 3, 1825	18th	Elected in 1822. Lost re-election.	1823–1833; Orange County
John Hallock Jr. (Ridgebury)	Jacksonian	March 4, 1825 – March 3, 1829	19th 20th	Elected in 1824. Re-elected in 1826. Retired.	1823–1833; Orange County
Hector Craig (Craigville)	Jacksonian	March 4, 1829 – July 12, 1830	21st	Elected in 1828. Resigned.	1823–1833; Orange County
Vacant		July 12, 1830 – December 6, 1830	21st		1823–1833; Orange County
Samuel W. Eager (Montgomery)	Anti-Jacksonian	December 6, 1830 – March 3, 1831	21st	Elected to finish Craig's term. Retired.	1823–1833; Orange County
Samuel J. Wilkin (Goshen)	Anti-Jacksonian	March 4, 1831 – March 3, 1833	22nd	Elected in 1830. [data missing]	1823–1833; Orange County
John W. Brown (Newburgh)	Jacksonian	March 4, 1833 – March 3, 1837	23rd 24th	Elected in 1832. Re-elected in 1834. [data missing]	1833–1843 [data missing]
Nathaniel Jones (Warwick)	Democratic	March 4, 1837 – March 3, 1841	25th 26th	Elected in 1836. Re-elected in 1838. [data missing]	1833–1843 [data missing]
James G. Clinton (Newburgh)	Democratic	March 4, 1841 – March 3, 1843	27th	Elected in 1840. Redistricted to the 9th district.	1833–1843 [data missing]
Hamilton Fish (New York)	Whig	March 4, 1843 – March 3, 1845	28th	Elected in 1842. Lost re-election.	1843–1853 [data missing]
William W. Campbell (New York)	Know Nothing	March 4, 1845 – March 3, 1847	29th	Elected in 1844. Retired.	1843–1853 [data missing]
David S. Jackson (New York)	Democratic	March 4, 1847 – April 19, 1848	30th	Elected in 1846. Declared vacant due to contested election.	1843–1853 [data missing]
Vacant		April 19, 1848 – December 4, 1848	30th		1843–1853 [data missing]
Horace Greeley (New York)	Whig	December 4, 1848 – March 3, 1849	30th	Elected to finish Jackson's term. Lost nomination to the full term.	1843–1853 [data missing]
James Brooks (New York)	Whig	March 4, 1849 – March 3, 1853	31st 32nd	Elected in 1848. Re-elected in 1850. Lost re-election.	1843–1853 [data missing]
John Wheeler (New York)	Democratic	March 4, 1853 – March 3, 1857	33rd 34th	Elected in 1852. Re-elected in 1854. Retired.	1853–1863 [data missing]
John Cochrane (New York)	Democratic	March 4, 1857 – March 3, 1861	35th 36th	Elected in 1856. Re-elected in 1858. Lost re-election.	1853–1863 [data missing]
Frederick A. Conkling (New York)	Republican	March 4, 1861 – March 3, 1863	37th	Elected in 1860. Lost re-election.	1853–1863 [data missing]
Elijah Ward (New York)	Democratic	March 4, 1863 – March 3, 1865	38th	Redistricted from the 7th district and re-elected in 1862. Lost re-election.	1863–1873 [data missing]
Henry J. Raymond (New York)	Republican	March 4, 1865 – March 3, 1867	39th	Elected in 1864. Lost renomination.	1863–1873 [data missing]
Thomas E. Stewart (New York)	Conservative; Republican	March 4, 1867 – March 3, 1869	40th	Elected in 1866. Retired.	1863–1873 [data missing]
Samuel S. Cox (New York)	Democratic	March 4, 1869 – March 3, 1873	41st 42nd	Elected in 1868. Re-elected in 1870. Lost re-election.	1863–1873 [data missing]
James Brooks (New York)	Democratic	March 4, 1873 – April 30, 1873	43rd	Redistricted from the 8th district and re-elected in 1872. Died.	1873–1883 [data missing]
Vacant		April 30, 1873 – November 4, 1873	43rd		1873–1883 [data missing]
Samuel S. Cox (New York)	Democratic	November 4, 1873 – March 3, 1885	43rd 44th 45th 46th 47th 48th	Elected to finish Brooks's term. Re-elected in 1874. Re-elected in 1876. Re-elected in 1878. Re-elected in 1880. Re-elected in 1882. Redistricted to the 8th district.	1873–1883 [data missing]
Samuel S. Cox (New York)	Democratic	November 4, 1873 – March 3, 1885	43rd 44th 45th 46th 47th 48th	Elected to finish Brooks's term. Re-elected in 1874. Re-elected in 1876. Re-elected in 1878. Re-elected in 1880. Re-elected in 1882. Redistricted to the 8th district.	1883–1893 [data missing]
Nicholas Muller (New York)	Democratic	March 4, 1885 – March 3, 1887	49th	Redistricted from the 5th district and re-elected in 1884.	1883–1893 [data missing]
Amos J. Cummings (New York)	Democratic	March 4, 1887 – March 3, 1889	50th	Redistricted from the 5th district and re-elected in 1886.	1883–1893 [data missing]
Frank T. Fitzgerald (New York)	Democratic	March 4, 1889 – November 4, 1889	51st	Elected in 1888. Resigned to become register of New York County.	1883–1893 [data missing]
Vacant		November 4, 1889 – December 9, 1889	51st		1883–1893 [data missing]
Charles H. Turner (New York)	Democratic	December 9, 1889 – March 3, 1891	51st	Elected to finish Fitzgerald's term. [data missing]	1883–1893 [data missing]
John R. Fellows (New York)	Democratic	March 4, 1891 – March 3, 1893	52nd	Elected in 1890. Redistricted to the 14th district.	1883–1893 [data missing]
Thomas F. Magner (New York)	Democratic	March 4, 1893 – March 3, 1895	53rd	Redistricted from the 5th district and re-elected in 1892.	1893–1903 [data missing]
James R. Howe (Brooklyn)	Republican	March 4, 1895 – March 3, 1899	54th 55th	Elected in 1894. Re-elected in 1896. [data missing]	1893–1903 [data missing]
Mitchell May (Brooklyn)	Democratic	March 4, 1899 – March 3, 1901	56th	Elected in 1898.	1893–1903 [data missing]
George H. Lindsay (Brooklyn)	Democratic	March 4, 1901 – March 3, 1903	57th	Elected in 1900. Redistricted to the 2nd district.	1893–1903 [data missing]
Robert Baker (Brooklyn)	Democratic	March 4, 1903 – March 3, 1905	58th	Elected in 1902.	1903–1913 [data missing]
William M. Calder (Brooklyn)	Republican	March 4, 1905 – March 3, 1915	59th 60th 61st 62nd 63rd	Elected in 1904. Re-elected in 1906. Re-elected in 1908. Re-elected in 1910. Re-elected in 1912. [data missing]	1903–1913 [data missing]
William M. Calder (Brooklyn)	Republican	March 4, 1905 – March 3, 1915	59th 60th 61st 62nd 63rd	Elected in 1904. Re-elected in 1906. Re-elected in 1908. Re-elected in 1910. Re-elected in 1912. [data missing]	1913–1923 [data missing]
Frederick W. Rowe (Brooklyn)	Republican	March 4, 1915 – March 3, 1921	64th 65th 66th	Elected in 1914. Re-elected in 1916. Re-elected in 1918. [data missing]	1913–1923 [data missing]
Warren I. Lee (Brooklyn)	Republican	March 4, 1921 – March 3, 1923	67th	Elected in 1920. Lost re-election.	1913–1923 [data missing]
Charles I. Stengle (Brooklyn)	Democratic	March 4, 1923 – March 3, 1925	68th	Elected in 1922. Retired.	1923–1933 [data missing]
Andrew L. Somers (Brooklyn)	Democratic	March 4, 1925 – January 3, 1945	69th 70th 71st 72nd 73rd 74th 75th 76th 77th 78th	Elected in 1924. Re-elected in 1926. Re-elected in 1928. Re-elected in 1930. Re-elected in 1932. Re-elected in 1934. Re-elected in 1936. Re-elected in 1938. Re-elected in 1940. Re-elected in 1942. Redistricted to the 10th district.	1923–1933 [data missing]
Andrew L. Somers (Brooklyn)	Democratic	March 4, 1925 – January 3, 1945	69th 70th 71st 72nd 73rd 74th 75th 76th 77th 78th	Elected in 1924. Re-elected in 1926. Re-elected in 1928. Re-elected in 1930. Re-elected in 1932. Re-elected in 1934. Re-elected in 1936. Re-elected in 1938. Re-elected in 1940. Re-elected in 1942. Redistricted to the 10th district.	1933–1943 [data missing]
Andrew L. Somers (Brooklyn)	Democratic	March 4, 1925 – January 3, 1945	69th 70th 71st 72nd 73rd 74th 75th 76th 77th 78th	Elected in 1924. Re-elected in 1926. Re-elected in 1928. Re-elected in 1930. Re-elected in 1932. Re-elected in 1934. Re-elected in 1936. Re-elected in 1938. Re-elected in 1940. Re-elected in 1942. Redistricted to the 10th district.	1943–1945 [data missing]
James J. Delaney (Queens)	Democratic	January 3, 1945 – January 3, 1947	79th	Elected in 1944. Lost re-election.	1945–1973; Parts of Queens
Robert Nodar Jr. (Maspeth)	Republican	January 3, 1947 – January 3, 1949	80th	Elected in 1946. Lost re-election.	1945–1973; Parts of Queens
James J. Delaney (Queens)	Democratic	January 3, 1949 – January 3, 1953	81st 82nd	Elected in 1948. Re-elected in 1950. Redistricted to the 7th district.	1945–1973; Parts of Queens
Lester Holtzman (Queens)	Democratic	January 3, 1953 – December 31, 1961	83rd 84th 85th 86th 87th	Elected in 1952. Re-elected in 1954. Re-elected in 1956. Re-elected in 1958. Re-elected in 1960. Resigned.	1945–1973; Parts of Queens
Vacant		January 1, 1962 – February 19, 1962	87th		1945–1973; Parts of Queens
Benjamin S. Rosenthal (Queens)	Democratic	February 20, 1962 – January 3, 1963	87th	Elected to finish Holtzman's term. Redistricted to the 8th district.	1945–1973; Parts of Queens
Seymour Halpern (Queens)	Republican	January 3, 1963 – January 3, 1973	88th 89th 90th 91st 92nd	Redistricted from the 4th district and re-elected in 1962. Re-elected in 1964. Re-elected in 1966. Re-elected in 1968. Re-elected in 1970.	1945–1973; Parts of Queens
Lester L. Wolff (Great Neck)	Democratic	January 3, 1973 – January 3, 1981	93rd 94th 95th 96th	Redistricted from the 3rd district and re-elected in 1972. Re-elected in 1974. Re-elected in 1976. Re-elected in 1978. Lost re-election.	1973–1983; Parts of Nassau County and Queens
John LeBoutillier (Westbury)	Republican	January 3, 1981 – January 3, 1983	97th	Elected in 1980. Redistricted to the 3rd district and lost re-election.	1973–1983; Parts of Nassau County and Queens
Joseph P. Addabbo (Queens)	Democratic	January 3, 1983 – April 10, 1986	98th 99th	Redistricted from the 7th district and re-elected in 1982. Re-elected in 1984. Died.	1983–1993; Parts of Queens
Vacant		April 11, 1986 – June 9, 1986	99th		1983–1993; Parts of Queens
Alton Waldon (Queens)	Democratic	June 10, 1986 – January 3, 1987	99th	Elected to finish Addabbo's term. Lost re-nomination.	1983–1993; Parts of Queens
Floyd Flake (Queens)	Democratic	January 3, 1987 – November 17, 1997	100th 101st 102nd 103rd 104th 105th	Elected in 1986. Re-elected in 1988. Re-elected in 1990. Re-elected in 1992. Re-elected in 1994. Re-elected in 1996. Resigned to return to work at his church.	1983–1993; Parts of Queens
Floyd Flake (Queens)	Democratic	January 3, 1987 – November 17, 1997	100th 101st 102nd 103rd 104th 105th	Elected in 1986. Re-elected in 1988. Re-elected in 1990. Re-elected in 1992. Re-elected in 1994. Re-elected in 1996. Resigned to return to work at his church.	1993–2003 [data missing]
Vacant		November 17, 1997 – February 6, 1998	105th		1993–2003 [data missing]
Gregory Meeks (Queens)	Democratic	February 6, 1998 – January 3, 2013	105th 106th 107th 108th 109th 110th 111th 112th	Elected to finish Flake's term. Re-elected in 1998. Re-elected in 2000. Re-elected in 2002. Re-elected in 2004. Re-elected in 2006. Re-elected in 2008. Re-elected in 2010. Redistricted to the 5th district.	1993–2003 [data missing]
Gregory Meeks (Queens)	Democratic	February 6, 1998 – January 3, 2013	105th 106th 107th 108th 109th 110th 111th 112th	Elected to finish Flake's term. Re-elected in 1998. Re-elected in 2000. Re-elected in 2002. Re-elected in 2004. Re-elected in 2006. Re-elected in 2008. Re-elected in 2010. Redistricted to the 5th district.	2003–2013; Parts of Queens
Grace Meng (Queens)	Democratic	January 3, 2013 – present	113th 114th 115th 116th 117th 118th 119th	Elected in 2012. Re-elected in 2014. Re-elected in 2016. Re-elected in 2018. Re-elected in 2020. Re-elected in 2022. Re-elected in 2024. Re-elected in 2026.	2013–2023; Parts of Queens
Grace Meng (Queens)	Democratic	January 3, 2013 – present	113th 114th 115th 116th 117th 118th 119th	Elected in 2012. Re-elected in 2014. Re-elected in 2016. Re-elected in 2018. Re-elected in 2020. Re-elected in 2022. Re-elected in 2024. Re-elected in 2026.	2023–2025; Parts of Queens
Grace Meng (Queens)	Democratic	January 3, 2013 – present	113th 114th 115th 116th 117th 118th 119th	Elected in 2012. Re-elected in 2014. Re-elected in 2016. Re-elected in 2018. Re-elected in 2020. Re-elected in 2022. Re-elected in 2024. Re-elected in 2026.	2025–present Parts of Queens

== Election results ==
Note that in New York State electoral politics there are numerous minor parties at various points on the political spectrum. Certain parties will invariably endorse either the Republican or Democratic candidate for every office, hence the state electoral results contain both the party votes, and the final candidate votes (Listed as "Recap").

US House election, 1996: New York District 6
Party	Candidate	Votes	%	±%
Democratic	Floyd Flake (incumbent)	102,799	84.9	
Republican	Jorawar Misir	18,348	15.1	
Majority		84,451	69.7	
Turnout		121,147	100	

Special Election 1998: New York District 6
Party	Candidate	Votes	%	±%
Democratic	Gregory Meeks	14,224	56.5	−28.4
Conservative	Alton Waldon	5,229	20.8	+20.8
21st Century	Barbara M. Clark	3,305	13.1	+13.1
Republican	Celestine Miller	2,209	8.8	−6.3
Right to Life	Mary Cronin	206	0.8	+0.8
Majority		8,995	35.7	−34.0
Turnout		25,173	100	−79.2

US House election, 1998: New York District 6
Party	Candidate	Votes	%	±%
Democratic	Gregory Meeks (incumbent)	76,122	100	+43.5
Majority		76,122	100	+64.3
Turnout		76,122	100	+202.4

US House election, 2000: New York District 6
Party	Candidate	Votes	%	±%
Democratic	Gregory Meeks (incumbent)	120,818	100	0.0
Majority		120,818	100	0.0
Turnout		120,818	100	+58.7

US House election, 2002: New York District 6
Party	Candidate	Votes	%	±%
Democratic	Gregory Meeks (incumbent)	72,799	96.5	−3.5
Independence	Ray Clarke	2,632	3.5	+3.5
Majority		70,167	93.0	−7.0
Turnout		75,431	100	−37.6

US House election, 2004: New York District 6
Party	Candidate	Votes	%	±%
Democratic	Gregory Meeks (incumbent)	129,688	100	+3.5
Majority		129,688	100	+7.0
Turnout		129,688	100	+71.9

US House election, 2006: New York District 6
Party	Candidate	Votes	%	±%
Democratic	Gregory Meeks (incumbent)	69,405	100	0.0
Majority		69,405	100	0.0
Turnout		69,405	100	−46.5

US House election, 2008: New York District 6
Party	Candidate	Votes	%	±%
Democratic	Gregory Meeks (incumbent)	141,180	100	0.0
Majority		141,180	100	0.0
Turnout		141,180	100	+103.4

US House election, 2010: New York District 6
Party	Candidate	Votes	%	±%
Democratic	Gregory Meeks (incumbent)	85,096	87.8	−12.2
Republican	Asher E. Taub	11,826	12.2	+12.2
Majority		73,270	75.6	−24.4
Turnout		96,922	100	−31.3

US House election, 2012: New York District 6
Party	Candidate	Votes	%	±%
Democratic	Grace Meng	111,499	59.6	−28.2
Republican	Daniel Halloran	50,845	27.2	+15
Green	Evergreen Chou	1,913	1	+1
N/A	Blank/Void/Scattering	22,675	12.1	+12.1
Majority		60,654	32.4	−43.2
Turnout		186,932	100	

US House election, 2014: New York District 6
Party	Candidate	Votes	%	±%
Democratic	Grace Meng (incumbent)	55,368	71.6	+12
N/A	Blank/Void/Scattering	21,938	28.4	+16.3
Majority		60,654	43.2	+10.8
Turnout		77,306	100	

US House election, 2016: New York District 6
Party	Candidate	Votes	%	±%
Democratic	Grace Meng (incumbent)	136,506	72.1	+0.5
Republican	Danniel Maio	50,617	26.7	+26.7
Haris Bhatti Party	Haris Bhatti	2,123	1.1	1.1
Majority		85,889	45.4	+2.2
Turnout		189,246	100	

US House election, 2018: New York District 6
Party	Candidate	Votes	%	±%
Democratic	Grace Meng (incumbent)	111,646	90.9	+18.8
Green	Tom Hillgardner	11,209	9.1	+9.1
Majority		100,437	81.8	+36.4
Turnout		122,855	100	

US House election, 2020: New York District 6
Party	Candidate	Votes	%
Democratic	Grace Meng	144,149	61.7
Working Families	Grace Meng	14,713	6.3
Total	Grace Meng (incumbent)	158,862	68.0
Republican	Tom Zmich	67,735	29.0
Conservative	Tom Zmich	5,231	2.2
Save Our City	Tom Zmich	1,109	0.5
Libertarian	Tom Zmich	754	0.3
Total	Tom Zmich	74,829	32.0
Majority		51,033	36.0
Total votes		233,691	100.0

US House election, 2022: New York District 6
Party	Candidate	Votes	%
Democratic	Grace Meng (incumbent)	85,049	63.89
Republican	Tom Zmich	44,264	33.25
Conservative	Tom Zmich	3,240	2.43
Medical Freedom Party	Tom Zmich	431	0.32
Total	Tom Zmich	47,935	36.01
Write-in		130	0.10
Majority		37,114	27.88
Total votes		133,114	100.0

US House election, 2024: New York District 6
Party	Candidate	Votes	%
Democratic	Grace Meng (incumbent)	120,205	60.7
Republican	Thomas Zmich	69,654	35.2
Conservative	Thomas Zmich	4,905	2.5
Total	Thomas Zmich	74,559	37.6
Truth	Joseph Chou	3,272	1.7
Total votes		198,036	100.0

== See also ==
- List of United States congressional districts
- New York's congressional delegations
- New York's congressional districts
