= Ridgebury =

Ridgebury may refer to:

- Ridgebury Township, Pennsylvania, township in Pennsylvania, USA
- Ridgebury, Connecticut, village in Connecticut, USA
- Ridgebury, New York, hamlet in Wawayanda, New York, USA
