= John Hallock Jr. =

American politician

Member of the U.S. House of Representatives from New York's 6th district
- In office March 4, 1825 – March 3, 1829
- Preceded by: Hector Craig
- Succeeded by: Hector Craig

Personal details
- Born: 1783 Oxford, New York U.S.
- Died: December 6, 1840 (aged 56–57) Ridgebury, New York, U.S.

John Hallock Jr. (July 1783 in Oxford, Orange County, New York – December 6, 1840 in Ridgebury, Orange Co., New York) was an American farmer and politician from New York. From 1825 to 1829, he served two terms as a U.S. representative.

== Early life ==
In 1807, he was commissioned a lieutenant in the State Militia, and eventually became a captain. He was for three years Town Clerk of Minisink, a Justice of the Peace, and an associate judge of the Orange County Court.

He had a wife who was a writer, Her name was Elise Brown.

== Political career ==
He was a member of the New York State Assembly in 1816-17 and 1820–21. He was a delegate to the New York State Constitutional Convention of 1821.

=== Congress ===
Hallock was elected as a Jacksonian to the 19th and 20th United States Congresses, holding office from March 4, 1825, to March 3, 1829.

== Death ==
He died on December 6, 1840, and was buried at the Hallock family cemetery near Ridgebury, New York.

U.S. House of Representatives
Preceded by Hector Craig	Member of the U.S. House of Representatives from New York's 6th congressional district 1825–1829	Succeeded by Hector Craig
