= Charles I. Stengle =

American politician

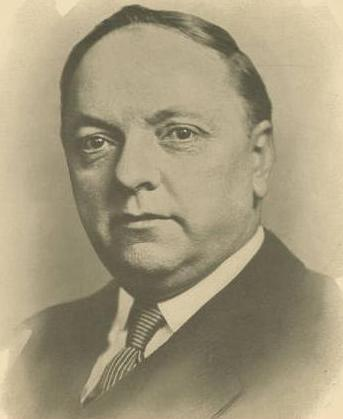

Member of the U.S. House of Representatives from New York's 6th district
- In office March 4, 1923 – March 3, 1925
- Preceded by: Warren I. Lee
- Succeeded by: Andrew Lawrence Somers

Personal details
- Born: Charles Irwin Stengel; December 5, 1869 Savageville, Virginia, U.S.
- Died: November 23, 1953 (aged 83) New Shrewsbury, New Jersey, U.S.
- Resting place: Monmouth Memorial Park in Tinton Falls, New Jersey
- Party: Democratic

Charles Irwin Stengle (December 5, 1869 – November 23, 1953) was an American newspaperman and politician who served one term as a U.S. representative from New York, serving one term from 1923 to 1925.

== Biography ==
Born in Savageville, Virginia, Stengle attended the public schools. In 1890, he graduated from Goldey College (now Goldey–Beacom College) in Wilmington, Delaware.

=== Early career ===
Stengle served as the chaplain of the Delaware House of Representatives in 1898. He then moved to Virginia, working in the newspaper business in Norfolk and Fredericksburgh. He moved to New York City in 1910 where he continued his career in journalism until 1917. Secretary of the municipal civil service commission of New York City from January 1, 1918, to January 1, 1923, when he resigned.

=== Congress ===
Stengle was elected as a Democrat to the Sixty-eighth Congress (March 4, 1923 – March 3, 1925). He was not a candidate for renomination in 1924 to the Sixty-ninth Congress.

=== Later career ===
He was appointed by President Coolidge in 1925 as a lieutenant colonel, Specialist Reserves, attached to The Adjutant General's Office.

He was editor of the National Farm News. Legislative representative of the American Federation of Government Employees from 1934 until his retirement in August 1953.

== Death and burial ==
He died in Shaftos Corner, New Shrewsbury, New Jersey, on November 23, 1953. He was interred at Monmouth Memorial Park in Tinton Falls, New Jersey.

== Sources ==
- United States Congress. "Charles I. Stengle (id: S000850)". Biographical Directory of the United States Congress.

U.S. House of Representatives
Preceded by Warren I. Lee	Member of the U.S. House of Representatives from New York's 6th congressional district 1923–1925	Succeeded by Andrew Lawrence Somers
