= Walter Case =

American lawyer and politician

Member of the U.S. House of Representatives from New York's 6th district
- In office March 4, 1819 – March 3, 1821
- Preceded by: James W. Wilkin
- Succeeded by: Charles Borland Jr.

Personal details
- Born: 1776 Pleasant Valley, New York
- Died: October 7, 1859 (aged 82–83) Fishkill, New York
- Party: Democratic-Republican
- Education: Union College
- Occupation: Lawyer

Walter Case (1776 – October 7, 1859) was an American lawyer and politician from New York.

== Life ==
Case was educated by private tutors, and then attended Newburgh Academy. He graduated from Union College in 1799. Then he studied law, was admitted to the bar in 1802, and commenced practice in Newburgh.

Case was elected as a Democratic-Republican to the 16th United States Congress, holding office from March 4, 1819, to March 3, 1821. Afterwards he resumed the practice of law. He was affiliated with the Whig Party after its formation.

He moved to New York City in 1844 and continued the practice of law until 1848, when he retired.

He was buried at the Fishkill Rural Cemetery.

U.S. House of Representatives
Preceded by James W. Wilkin	Member of the U.S. House of Representatives from New York's 6th congressional district 1819–1821	Succeeded by Charles Borland, Jr.
