= Andrew Lawrence Somers =

American politician

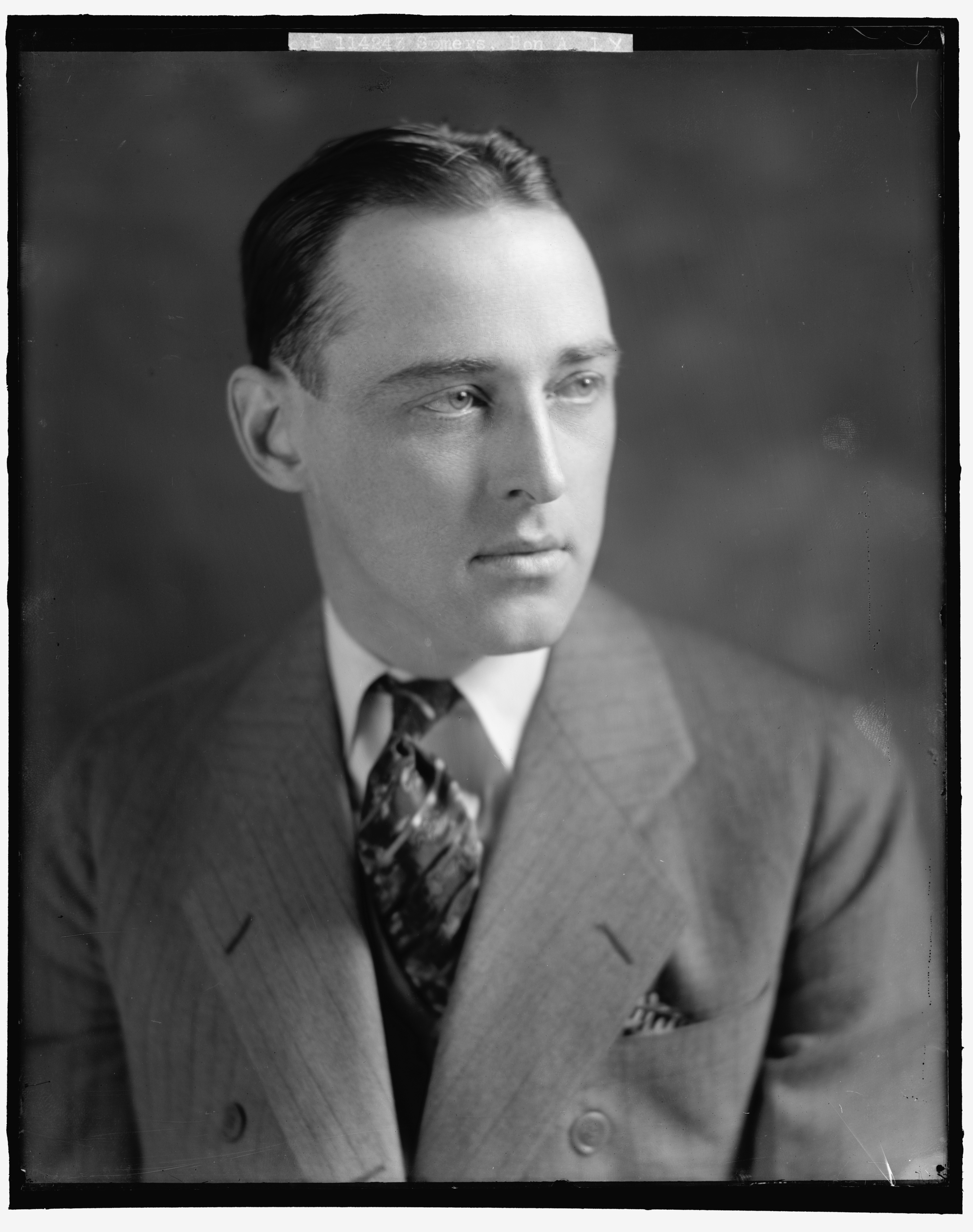

Member of the U.S. House of Representatives from New York
- In office March 4, 1925 – April 6, 1949
- Preceded by: Charles I. Stengle
- Succeeded by: Edna F. Kelly
- Constituency: 6th district (1925–1945); 10th district (1945–1949)

Personal details
- Born: March 21, 1895 Brooklyn, New York, U.S.
- Died: April 6, 1949 (aged 54) Queens, New York, U.S.
- Party: Democratic
- Education: Manhattan College; New York University

Andrew Lawrence Somers (March 21, 1895 – April 6, 1949) was an American politician who was a Democratic member of the U.S. House of Representatives from New York, serving from 1925 until his death in 1949. Representing a Brooklyn district (an area with a substantial immigrant and Jewish population), Somers' long tenure spanned the economic upheavals of the interwar period, the transformative New Deal era, World War II, and the early stages of the Cold War. He was known for his expertise in monetary legislation, his efforts to aid European Jews fleeing persecution during World War II and his later advocacy related to the founding of the State of Israel.

== Biography ==
He attended St. Teresa's Academy in Brooklyn, Brooklyn College Preparatory School, Manhattan College, and the Pratt Institute. Subsequently, he was an entrepreneur in the dry color and chemical fields.

=== Military service ===
Somers enlisted in the United States military on July 18, 1917, and served in World War I. Initially, he was a naval aviator in the United States Naval Flying Corps, but was later transferred to the Marine Corps and was a captain in the Marine Corps Reserve. He was honorably discharged on March 4, 1919.

=== Congressional career ===
Somers became active in Democratic Party politics under the tutelage of the Brooklyn Democrat leader John H. McCooey. Somers defeated his Republican challenger, Warren I. Lee. He was just 29 at the time he took office, earning him the nickname "the boy Congressman."

During his years in Congress, Somers chaired the Committee on Coinage, Weights, and Measures. A strong supporter of President Franklin D. Roosevelt's New Deal policies, Somers successfully guided FDR's gold devaluation bills through the House of Representatives.

Somers also chaired the Committee on Mines and Mining (Seventy-ninth Congress), and the Committee on Public Lands (Eighty-first Congress). He also was a delegate to the Democratic National Convention in 1928.

Somers was actively involved in efforts to rescue Jews during the Holocaust, advocated for a Jewish national homeland in Palestine, and helped lead the campaign to create a Jewish army to fight alongside the Allies in World War II.

=== Committee leadership and policy focus ===
Somers chaired the House Committee on Coinage, Weights, and Measures from the Seventy-second through the Seventy-fifth Congresses (1931-1939). Under his leadership, the committee oversaw legislation regulating U.S. currency and coinage as well as standardization of weights and measures to ensurer fair trade and consumer protection.

=== Coinage and currency reform ===
During the New Deal period, Congress enacted measures to stabilize the economy and reform the nation's financial system. Somers presided over hearings and considered bills addressing silver purchases, gold revaluation, and modifications to the U.S. coinage standards. His committee work intersected with the Roosevelt Administration's initiatives, such as the Gold Reserve Act of 1934 which aimed to restore confidence in the banking system and recalibrate the dollar's value.

=== Standardization of weights and measures ===
Somers' committee work included ensuring standardized measurements for interstate commerce, a critical aspect of maintaining fair and competitive markets.

After the Legislative Reorganization Act of 1946 merged the Coinage Committee into the House Committee on Banking Reforms to shape broader financial and banking measures, including measures relevant to the United States' emerging role in the postwar global economy.

=== Social Security Act (1935) ===
Somers joined the majority of the House Democrats in voting for the Social Security Act establishing a safety net of old-age pensions, unemployment insurance, and aid for the disabled.

=== Financial reforms ===
Somers supported key banking legislation such as the Glass-Steagall Act (1933), which established the Federal Deposit Insurance Corporation (FDIC) and separated commercial from investment banking.

=== Support for Jewish refugee rescue efforts ===
Somers backed congressional resolutions and signed on to appeals urging the Roosevelt Administration and Allied governments to facilitate the rescue and admission of Jewish refugees. He supported proposals related to the Wagner-Rogers Bill (1939), which sought to admit refugee children to the United States and later measures that called for the establishment of government agencies to assist victims of Nazi oppression. Although the Wagner-Roger Bill failed, the pressure from Somers and aligned legislators contributed to the eventual creation of the War Refugee Board in 1944. The Congressional Record includes multiple entries from 1943-1944 where Somers' colleagues publicity acknowledge widespread support in Congress, including Somers, for more robust U.S. action to save Jews trapped under Nazi rule.

=== Advocacy and public appeals ===
Somers's name was associated with House caucuses sympathetic to Jewish rescue. He also joined appeals to the State Department and President Roosevelt, urging more proactive steps to mitigate the ongoing humanitarian crisis.

Support for the formation of Israel as the war ended and attention turned toward the fate of Holocaust survivors and the status of Palestine, Somers became involved in congressional dialogues supporting Jewish aspirations in the British Mandate of Palestine.

=== Legislative and public stance on Israel ===
Following President Harry S. Truman's recognition of the State of Israel on May 14, 1948, Somers publicly welcomed the decision. In House proceedings as well as in correspondence preserved in archival holdings, Somers praised the new nation's creation as a vital step toward providing a secure refuge for survivors of the Holocaust and cementing democratic values in the Middle East.

=== The Jewish Army Campaign ===
Somers was one of the earliest supporters of the Jewish political action committees collectively known as the Bergson Group. The congressman was approached in 1941 by the Bergson Group's new Washington lobbyist, Rabbi Baruch Rabinowitz. In his unpublished autobiography, Rabinowitz wrote that Somers's sympathy for the plight of the Jews in Nazi-dominated Europe was rooted in family lore. According to Rabinowitz, Somers's grandmother and her infant son (his father), found themselves in dire straits upon arriving in the United States from Ireland and were befriended by a Jewish family.

During the Bergson Group's first months lobbying in Washington, when it did not yet have its own office, Congressman Somers permitted Rabinowitz to work out of his Capitol Hill office.

Initially known as the Committee for a Jewish Army of Stateless and Palestinian Jews, the Bergson Group in 1941–1942 focused on seeking U.S. support for the creation of an armed Jewish force that would fight alongside the Allies against the Nazis. Somers introduced a "sense of Congress" resolution to that effect in February 1942, sparking the first serious public discussions concerning the Jewish army proposal.

The Roosevelt and Churchill administrations opposed the proposal, on the grounds that it might provoke a backlash in the Arab world, where the idea of a Jewish army was seen as a precursor to the creation of a Jewish state in British Mandatory Palestine. Rattled by Somers's outspoken support for the Jewish army idea, one British Embassy official in Washington privately described the congressman as "the less happy type of Irish American Catholic demagogue." The British government rejected a request by Rep. Somers and three other Jewish army advocates to visit London in 1942 to promote the proposal.

In late 1944, the British government decided that establishing a Jewish fighting force, which it called the Jewish Brigade, was necessary to impress American public opinion and avoid strains in the U.S.-British relationship. Prime Minister Winston Churchill explained the establishment of the Jewish Brigade in these terms: "I like the idea of the Jews trying to get at the murderers of their fellow-countrymen in Europe, and I think it would give a great deal of satisfaction in the United States." The Bergson Group celebrated the creation of the Jewish Brigade by holding a dinner in Washington to honor Rep. Somers as the leader of the congressional effort.

=== Rescue from the Holocaust ===
In December 1942, the Allies publicly confirmed that the Germans were carrying out the systematic slaughter of millions of Jews. The Bergson Group responded by launching a campaign for U.S. action to rescue Jews from the Nazis. Somers played a leading role in that effort.

Somers's name appeared on dozens of full-page advertisements advocating rescue, which the Bergson Group placed in newspapers around the country. The public endorsement by a prominent member of Congress added luster to the Bergson efforts. Somers gave numerous speeches in Congress supporting Bergson's rescue demands and addressed the group's conferences.

It was politically risky for Somers to play such a high-profile role in the Bergson Group. He was a loyal Democrat and Roosevelt supporter. He also needed the backing of the party and the White House in his re-election bids. Nonetheless, Somers opted to publicly identify with a campaign that directly challenged FDR on the Jewish refugee crisis.

Former New York City Mayor Edward I. Koch referred to Somers's political circumstances in a 2007 address to the national conference of the David S. Wyman Institute for Holocaust Studies: "Somers was a Democrat. A liberal Democrat from New York, who was openly challenging the policies of a liberal and very popular Democratic president, in the middle of a world war. It is not a simple thing to oppose a president from your own party. I remember that more than a few of my fellow Democrats were angry at me for challenging President Jimmy Carter's policies toward Israel in 1980. I am not comparing myself to Andy Somers, and I am certainly not comparing Carter to Roosevelt. I am merely pointing out that Somers was risking his political life by going out on a limb with the Bergson Group against the Roosevelt administration."

In August 1943, Somers headed a delegation of rescue advocates that left for Canada, intending to confront President Roosevelt and Prime Minister Churchill, who were meeting in Quebec. En route, the congressman received a telegram from the White House offering a meeting with the president in Washington after the summit. Based on that offer, the delegation canceled its trip to Canada. But the promise of a meeting with the president was never fulfilled.

Somers sparked significant controversy in the autumn of 1943 over the Roosevelt administration's abandonment of the Jews. This episode began when Bergson Group representatives met with Secretary of State Cordell Hull on August 12, 1943, and asked for permission to send delegations to Palestine, Spain, and Turkey, to press local government officials to remove hindrances to the arrival of refugees. Congressman Somers would head the group going to Turkey. Secretary Hull told the Bergson officials he was "sympathetic" to their request. But two months later, famed investigative journalist I.F. Stone, writing in the New York City daily newspaper PM, revealed that the State Department was still stalling on Bergson's requests.

Stone quoted Somers extensively. "I think the run-around being given us by the State Department contrasts shamefully with the courage shown recently by the governments of Denmark and Sweden in facilitating the escape of 90 percent of the Danish Jews from Nazi round-up, " the congressman said. "If small countries, one of them under Nazi occupation, the other under the show of Nazi power, can do this much, surely we can do more than make sympathetic speeches about the problem. The frontiers of Europe today are as full of holes as a sieve, as shown by the Danish experience and as shown by the ease with which thousands have fled across the Swiss and Spanish borders. If we establish rescue camps in Turkey and other neutral countries, the Jews of Nazi-occupied Europe will find a way to get to them." Somers vowed, "I'm going to force this to a showdown with the State Department. Who knows how many people we could have reduced by now if our delegation had been permitted to proceed as soon as Secretary Hull gave his approval."

The State Department never did grant permission to Somers to travel to Turkey, but the publicity about the controversy helped increase pressure on the Roosevelt administration over the refugee issue. It erupted just as members of Congress, including Somers, were introducing a resolution urging the president to create a new government agency for the sole purpose of rescuing Jewish refugees. The hearings about the resolution played a major role in bringing about the creation of the U.S. government's War Refugee Board. The board helped rescue more than 200,000 Jews from the Nazis during the final months of the war.

According to the historian Dr. Rafael Medoff, author of numerous books and articles about America's response to the Holocaust and the Bergson group, "Cynical British officials believed Congressman Somers found common cause with the Jewish people because, as an Irish-American, he sympathized with the Jewish fight to oust the British from Palestine. While Somers's concern about the British-Irish situation no doubt sensitized him to what the Jews faced in Palestine, his support for the rescue of European Jewry sprang from nothing more complicated than human decency and the natural desire for justice."

=== Advocacy for Israeli Statehood ===
During the post World War II years, Somers actively supported the Bergson Group's efforts to mobilize American support for the creation of a Jewish state. Once again, he added his name to Bergson newspaper ads and spoke in Congress and in public addresses about the news for a Jewish homeland. He also served as co-chair of the Bergson Group's American League for a Free Palestine. Somers visited the new State of Israel for two weeks in the summer of 1948. He repeatedly pressed the Truman administration to loan the Jewish state funds to address urgent humanitarian needs, such as the absorption of hundreds of thousands of Holocaust survivors and Jews who were expelled en masse from Arab countries in the wake of the war. In February 1949, a $100-million loan was approved.

=== Death ===
Somers was admitted to the U.S. Naval Hospital, in Queens, NY, on March 1, 1949, for an unspecified stomach ailment. He died there on April 6, 1949, and was buried in Holy Cross Cemetery, Brooklyn. Nearly 1,000 family members, friends, and political associates attended the funeral.

== See also ==
- List of members of the United States Congress who died in office (1900–1949)

== General references ==
- United States Congress. "Andrew Lawrence Somers (id: S000676)". Biographical Directory of the United States Congress.

U.S. House of Representatives
Preceded by Charles I. Stengle	Member of the U.S. House of Representatives from New York's 6th congressional district 1925–1945	Succeeded by James J. Delaney
Preceded by Emanuel Celler	Member of the U.S. House of Representatives from New York's 10th congressional district 1945–1949	Succeeded by Edna F. Kelly
