= Samuel W. Eager =

American politician

Member of the U.S. House of Representatives from New York's 6th district
- In office November 2, 1830 – March 3, 1831
- Preceded by: Hector Craig
- Succeeded by: Samuel J. Wilkin

Personal details
- Born: March 8, 1789 Neelytown, New York, U.S.
- Died: December 23, 1860 (aged 71) Newburgh, New York, U.S.
- Resting place: St. George Cemetery

Samuel Watkins Eager (April 8, 1789 – December 23, 1860) was an American lawyer and politician who briefly served as a U.S. representative from New York from 1830 to 1831.

== Biography ==
Born in Neelytown, New York, Eager attended Montgomery Academy in Montgomery, New York, and graduated from Princeton College in 1809. He studied law. He was admitted to the bar in 1811 and commenced practice in Newburgh, New York. He moved to Montgomery, New York, in 1826, and continued the practice of his profession.

=== Congress ===
Eager was elected as an Anti-Jacksonian candidate to the Twenty-first Congress to fill the vacancy caused by the resignation of Hector Craig and served from November 2, 1830, to March 3, 1831. He was not a candidate at the election held the same day for the Twenty-second Congress.

=== Later career and death ===
He returned to Newburgh in 1836 and engaged in literary pursuits.

He died in Newburgh, New York, December 23, 1860. He was interred in St. George Cemetery.

U.S. House of Representatives
Preceded by Hector Craig	Member of the U.S. House of Representatives from New York's 6th congressional district 1830–1831	Succeeded by Samuel J. Wilkin
