= Parmenio Adams =

American politician (1776–1832)

Member of the U.S. House of Representatives from New York's 29th district
- In office January 7, 1824 – March 3, 1827
- Preceded by: Isaac Wilson
- Succeeded by: David Ellicott Evans

Personal details
- Born: September 9, 1776 Simsbury, Connecticut, United States (declared)
- Died: February 19, 1832 (aged 55) Alexander, New York
- Party: Democratic-Republican
- Spouse: Eleanor Wells Adams
- Children: 4
- Profession: Businessman, Politician, Miller, Construction Contractor

Military service
- Allegiance: United States
- Branch/service: New York State Militia
- Rank: Major
- Commands: Commandant of the New York Volunteers
- Battles/wars: War of 1812

Parmenio Adams (September 9, 1776 – February 19, 1832) was a businessman and politician from New York. He was a member of the United States House of Representatives.

== Biography ==
Adams was born in Simsbury, Connecticut, to Parmenio Adams and Chloe Nearing. He married Eleanor Wells on October 23, 1795, and they had four children.

In 1806, Adams moved his family to Phelps Corners, which is now located in part of the Village of Attica, which lies in the Town of Alexander. Adams served as lieutenant of light Infantry, captain of Grenadiers, second and first major, and division inspector of Infantry in the New York State Militia from 1806 until 1816. During the War of 1812, he was active on the Niagara frontier as Major, division inspector of Infantry, and commandant of the New York Volunteers.

Adams was Sheriff of Genesee County from 1815 to 1816 and again from 1818 to 1821. He had agricultural interests, ran a gristmill, and was a construction contractor on the Erie Canal.

At the United States House of Representatives elections in New York, 1822, Isaac Wilson was declared elected in the 29th District by a small margin. Adams contested Wilson's election, showing that the returns had been certified mistakenly, and Adams was seated in the 18th United States Congress as an Adams-Clay Democratic-Republican on January 7, 1824. Adams was re-elected as an Adams man to the 19th United States Congress, holding office until March 3, 1827.

== Death ==
Adams died in Alexander, Genesee County, New York, on February 19, 1832. He is interred at Forest Hill Cemetery, in the Town of Attica, now in Wyoming County.

U.S. House of Representatives
Preceded by Isaac Wilson	Member of the U.S. House of Representatives from New York's 29th congressional district 1824–1827	Succeeded by David Ellicott Evans
