= Frederick W. Rowe =

American politician

Member of the U.S. House of Representatives from New York's 6th district
- In office March 4, 1915 – March 3, 1921
- Preceded by: William M. Calder
- Succeeded by: Warren I. Lee

Personal details
- Born: March 19, 1863 Wappingers Falls, New York, U.S.
- Died: June 20, 1946 (aged 83) Rockville Centre, New York, U.S.
- Party: Republican

Frederick William Rowe (March 19, 1863 – June 20, 1946) was a U.S. representative from New York.

== Biography ==
Born in Wappingers Falls, New York, Rowe attended the common schools. He was graduated from De Garmo Institute in 1882 and from Colgate University, Hamilton, New York, in 1887. He studied law. He was admitted to the bar in New York City in 1889 and practiced in Brooklyn and New York City until 1904. In 1896 he helped create a combination with several landowners which would develop what became Crown Heights South. This company was named the Eastern Parkway Company and had a hand in shaping the character of the neighborhood. He served as president of several companies, including a street railway company. He served as director of the Dime Savings Bank of Brooklyn.

Rowe was elected as a Republican to the Sixty-fourth, Sixty-fifth, and Sixty-sixth Congresses (March 4, 1915 – March 3, 1921). He was not a candidate for renomination in 1920. He resumed his former business activities in New York City. He died in Rockville Centre, New York on June 20, 1946. He was interred in Green-Wood Cemetery, Brooklyn.

U.S. House of Representatives
Preceded by William M. Calder	Member of the U.S. House of Representatives from New York's 6th congressional district 1915–1921	Succeeded by Warren I. Lee
