= John Ashley Griswold =

American politician

John A. Griswold
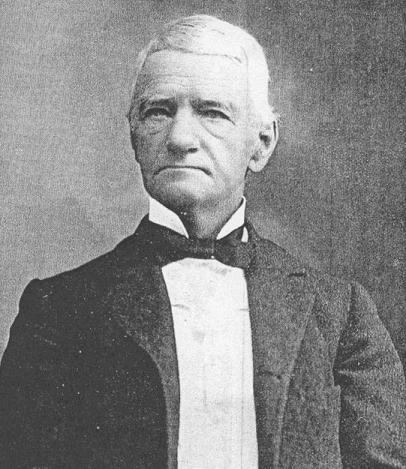

Member of the U.S. House of Representatives from New York's 13th district
- In office 1869–1871
- Preceded by: Thomas Cornell
- Succeeded by: Joseph H. Tuthill

Personal details
- Born: John Ashley Griswold; November 18, 1822 Cairo, New York, U.S.
- Died: February 22, 1902 (aged 79) Catskill, New York, U.S.
- Resting place: Catskill Village Cemetery
- Spouse: Elizabeth M. Roberts (after 1857)
- Parent(s): Stephen H. Griswold; Phoebe Ashley Griswold

John Ashley Griswold (November 18, 1822 – February 22, 1902) was an attorney, judge and politician from Catskill, New York. He was most notable for his service as a U.S. representative from 1869 to 1871.

== Early life ==
Griswold was born in Cairo, New York on November 18, 1822, the son of Stephen H. and Phoebe (née Ashley) Griswold. Griswold attended the common schools, and the academies in Prattsville and Catskill, New York.

== Career ==
He taught school and then studied law with his uncle, Addison C. Griswold, and Richard Corning, a brother of Erastus Corning. Griswold was admitted to the bar in 1848, after which he commenced practice in Greene County.

A Democrat in politics, Griswold served as district attorney of Greene County from 1856 to 1859, and as county judge from 1863 to 1867.

=== Congress and later career ===
Griswold was elected as to the Forty-first Congress (March 4, 1869 – March 3, 1871). He declined to be a candidate for renomination in 1870 and resumed the practice of law. Griswold was elected Town Supervisor of Catskill in 1871, and served one term. He served as member of the State constitutional convention in 1894.

== Personal life ==
In 1857, Griswold married Elizabeth M. Roberts of Clintondale, New York. She died in 1896.

He died of "old age" in Catskill on February 22, 1902. He was interred in Catskill Village Cemetery.

== Sources ==
=== Books ===
- B. R. Pub. Co. (1899). Biographical Review: Containing Life Sketches of Leading Citizens of Schoharie, Schenectady, and Greene Counties, New York. Vol. XXXIII. Boston, MA: Biographical Review Publishing Company.
- Spencer, Thomas E. (1998). Where They're Buried. Baltimore, MD: Clearfield Company. p. 240. ISBN 978-0-8063-4823-0.

=== Newspapers ===
- "Death Notice, John A. Griswold". Buffalo Express. Buffalo, NY. February 24, 1902 – via Newspapers.com.

U.S. House of Representatives
Preceded by Thomas Cornell	Member of the U.S. House of Representatives from New York's 13th congressional district 1869–1871	Succeeded by Joseph H. Tuthill
