= Isaac Wilson (American politician) =

American politician (1780–1848)

Member of the U.S. House of Representatives from New York's 29th district
- In office March 4, 1823 – January 7, 1824
- Preceded by: district created
- Succeeded by: Parmenio Adams

Personal details
- Born: June 25, 1780 Middlebury, Vermont, U.S.
- Died: October 25, 1848 (aged 68) Batavia, Illinois, U.S.

Isaac Wilson (June 25, 1780 Middlebury, then Vermont Republic, now Addison County, Vermont – October 25, 1848 Batavia, Kane County, Illinois) was an American politician from New York and Illinois.

== Life ==
Wilson served in the War of 1812 as a captain of Cavalry. He moved to Batavia, New York. He was a member from Genesee County of the New York State Assembly in 1816–1817. He was a member of the New York State Senate (Western D.) from 1818 to 1821. He was First Judge of the Genesee County Court from 1821 to 1823.

Wilson was declared elected as a Democratic-Republican to the 18th United States Congress, holding office from March 4, 1823, to January 7, 1824, when he was succeeded by Parmenio Adams. Wilson took his seat when Congress met on December 1, 1823, but Adams contested Wilson's election, because the election inspectors had made mistakes when certifying the returns and Adams was declared entitle to the seat.

Wilson was again First Judge of the Genesee County Court from 1830 to 1836. Afterwards he moved to Head of the Big Woods in Illinois. At Wilson's suggestion, the place was renamed Batavia, Illinois, after his former home. He was appointed Postmaster of Batavia on February 6, 1841, and served until July 21, 1846, when his successor was appointed.

He was buried at the East Batavia Cemetery in Batavia, Illinois.

== See also ==
- 1822 United States House of Representatives elections in New York

U.S. House of Representatives
New district	Member of the U.S. House of Representatives from New York's 29th congressional district 1823–1824	Succeeded by Parmenio Adams

== Sources ==
- United States Congress. "Isaac Wilson (id: W000586)". Biographical Directory of the United States Congress.
- The New York Civil List compiled by Franklin Benjamin Hough (pages 71, 123f, 147, 192, 317, 360 and 448; Weed, Parsons and Co., 1858)
- The New York Civil List compiled by Franklin Benjamin Hough, Stephen C. Hutchins and Edgar Albert Werner (1867; page 269)
- Cases of Contested Elections in Congress 1789 to 1834 compiled by Matthew St. Clair Clarke and David A. Hall (Washington, D.C., 1834; Case XLIX, pages 369ff)
- Place Names of Illinois by Edward Callary (page 25)
