= Joseph H. Tuthill =

American politician

Joseph Hasbrouck Tuthill
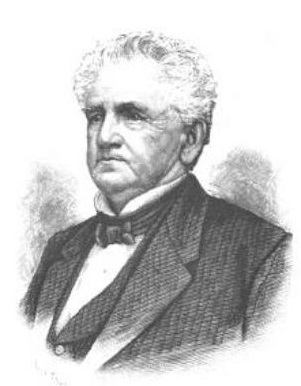

Member of the U.S. House of Representatives from New York's 13th district
- In office March 4, 1871 – March 3, 1873
- Preceded by: John A. Griswold
- Succeeded by: John O. Whitehouse

Personal details
- Born: February 25, 1811 Blooming Grove, New York, United States
- Died: July 27, 1877 (aged 66) Ellenville, New York, United States
- Resting place: Fantinekill Cemetery, Ellenville, New York, United States
- Party: Democratic
- Relatives: Selah Tuthill (uncle)

Joseph Hasbrouck Tuthill (February 25, 1811 – July 27, 1877) was a U.S. representative from New York, nephew of Selah Tuthill.

== Biography ==
Joseph. H. Tuthill was born in Blooming Grove, New York on February 25, 1811. He was educated in Blooming Grove and Shawangunk, where he moved with his parents in 1824.

He moved to New York City in 1828, Ulsterville (now a hamlet of Wawarsing) in 1832, and Ellenville (also part of Wawarsing) in 1834. Tuthill was a merchant and farmer, including serving as President of the Ellenville Glass Works and President of the Ellenville Savings Bank. In addition, he served as Ellenville's Postmaster.

A Democrat, he served as Wawarsing Town Supervisor and a member of the Ulster County Board of Supervisors from 1842 to 1843, 1862 to 1863 and 1866 to 1869. From 1843 to 1847 he was County Clerk.

During the Civil War Tuthill served as Excise Commissioner for Ulster County, responsible for collecting taxes on goods and services levied to support the war effort and assessing fines on individuals who attempted to evade paying the taxes.

Tuthill was an unsuccessful candidate for Congress in 1866. In 1870 he ran successfully for a seat in the Forty-second Congress and served one term, March 4, 1871, to March 3, 1873.

== Death and burial ==
He died in Ellenville on July 27, 1877. He was interred in Fantinekill Cemetery, near Ellenville.

== Family ==
Joseph H. Tuthill was the nephew of Selah Tuthill, who was also elected to Congress, but died before taking his seat.

U.S. House of Representatives
| Preceded by John A. Griswold | Member of the U.S. House of Representatives from New York's 13th congressional district 1871–1873 | Succeeded by John O. Whitehouse |
