= Jesse B. Thomas =

American politician (1777–1853)

Jesse Burgess Thomas
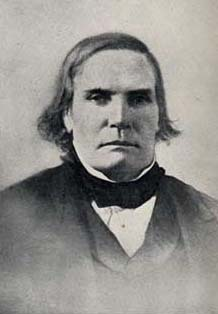

United States Senator from Illinois
- In office December 3, 1818 – March 3, 1829
- Preceded by: Seat established
- Succeeded by: John McLean

Delegate to the U.S. House of Representatives from the Indiana Territory's at-large district
- In office October 22, 1808 – March 3, 1809
- Preceded by: Benjamin Parke
- Succeeded by: Jonathan Jennings

Personal details
- Born: Jesse Burgess Thomas; 1777 Shepherdstown, Virginia, British America (later West Virginia)
- Died: May 2, 1853 (aged 75–76) Mount Vernon, Ohio, U.S.
- Party: Democratic-Republican (Before 1824); National Republican (1824–1834)

Jesse Burgess Thomas (1777 – May 2, 1853) was an American lawyer, judge and politician who served as a delegate from the Indiana Territory to the 10th Congress and later served as president of the Constitutional Convention which led to Illinois being admitted to the Union. He became one of Illinois' first two senators, and the author of the 1820 Missouri Compromise. After his retirement from the U.S. Senate in 1829 he lived the rest of his life in Ohio.

== Early and family life ==
Thomas was probably born in Shepherdstown, Virginia (which later became part of West Virginia), in part according to his 1850 census entry, although Appleton's Cyclopedia stated he was born somewhat east on what became the National Road in Hagerstown, Maryland (as was his slightly elder brother) and that he was descended from Lord Baltimore. His family moved to Kentucky when Jesse was an infant. He married Rebecca McKenzie (1776–1851) of New York, but they had no children who survived. Rebecca was the widow of Jean Francois Hamtramck and mother of John F. Hamtramck. He was of Welsh descent.

== Career ==
Thomas studied law with his elder brother Richard Symmes Thomas (1772–1828) in Bracken County, Kentucky, along the Ohio River, then moved to nearby Mason County, Kentucky, where he served as the county clerk until 1803. He then moved north of the Ohio River to Lawrenceburg in Indiana Territory, where he continued to practice law and became the territorial deputy attorney general in 1805. In the same year, he began serving as a delegate to the Territorial House of Representatives, and fellow delegates chose him as their speaker from 1805 to 1808.

When Benjamin Parke resigned as the territorial delegate to Congress, Thomas was appointed to fill the vacancy from October 22, 1808, until March 3, 1809, when Thomas moved westward to the new Illinois Territory as discussed below. Jonathan Jennings succeeded him as Indiana's territorial delegate and would later become the new state of Indiana's first U.S. representative and later Indiana's Governor.

Thomas moved westward to Kaskaskia, Illinois, on the Mississippi River (which made it flood-prone and ultimately transformed it into an island), then Cahokia and later Edwardsville in Madison County, Illinois, where Thomas would later train his nephew, confusingly known as Jesse B. Thomas, Jr., who would have a distinguished career as an Illinois lawyer and judge.

When Illinois became a territory in 1809, President James Madison (with the consent of the U.S. Senate) appointed Thomas judge of the United States court for the northwestern judicial district. Thomas exercised those duties from 1809 until 1818. Voters from St. Clair County (the oldest county in Illinois and with Cahokia as its major town) elected Thomas as Democratic-Republican to the Illinois State Constitutional Convention in 1818. Fellow delegates elected him to preside over the convention, which chose not to accept slavery in the new state. Upon the new state's admittance to the Union, fellow legislators elected Thomas to the U.S. Senate, in which he would serve for two terms (from 1818 until his retirement in 1829). In 1820, Thomas proposed the Missouri Compromise to permit slavery in Missouri while limiting slavery in the remainder of the Louisiana Purchase. In 1823 he switched parties and became a Crawford Republican. He served as chairman on the Committee on Public Lands in the 16th and 18th Congresses. He refused the nomination for a third term and moved to Mount Vernon, Ohio, in 1829, where he lived the rest of his life.

== Death and legacy ==
About two years after the death of his wife, Thomas killed himself on May 2, 1853, having lived more than seven decades. He is buried in Mound View Cemetery. Thomas's nephew, Jesse B. Thomas, Jr. (1806–1850), son of his brother Richard Symmes Thomas, served as Illinois Attorney General and on the Illinois Supreme Court.

U.S. House of Representatives
| Preceded by Benjamin Parke | Delegate to the U.S. House of Representatives from the Indiana Territory's at-large congressional district 1808–1809 | Succeeded by Jonathan Jennings |
U.S. Senate
| New seat | U.S. Senator (Class 3) from Illinois; 1818–1829; Served alongside: Ninian Edwards, John McLean, Elias Kane | Succeeded by John McLean |
| Preceded by Thomas Hill Williams | Chair of the Senate Public Lands Committee; 1820–1823 | Succeeded by David Barton |
