= John M. Robinson (Illinois politician) =

American judge

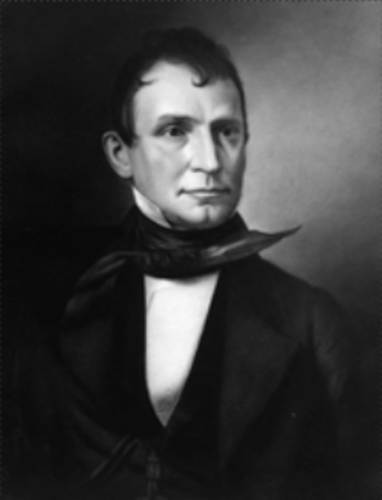
- Robinson's portrait at the Illinois Supreme Court.

United States Senator from Illinois
- In office December 11, 1830 – March 3, 1841
- Preceded by: David J. Baker
- Succeeded by: Samuel McRoberts

Personal details
- Born: April 10, 1794 Georgetown, Kentucky, U.S.
- Died: April 25, 1843 (aged 49) Ottawa, Illinois, U.S.
- Party: Democratic

John McCracken Robinson (April 10, 1794 – April 25, 1843) was a United States senator from Illinois.

Born near Georgetown, Kentucky, he attended the common schools and graduated from Transylvania University at Lexington. He studied law, and was admitted to the bar and began practice in Carmi, Illinois in 1818. He was a judge of the Illinois Supreme Court, and served as a general in the State militia. He was elected in 1830 as a Jacksonian (later a Democrat) to the U.S. Senate to fill the vacancy caused by the death of John McLean. He was reelected in 1835 and served from December 11, 1830, until his retirement on March 3, 1841, and was not a candidate for reelection. While in the Senate, he was chairman of the Committee on Engrossed Bills (Twenty-second Congress) and a member of the Committees on Militia (Twenty-second through Twenty-fourth Congresses) and Post Office and Post Roads (Twenty-fourth through Twenty-sixth Congresses).

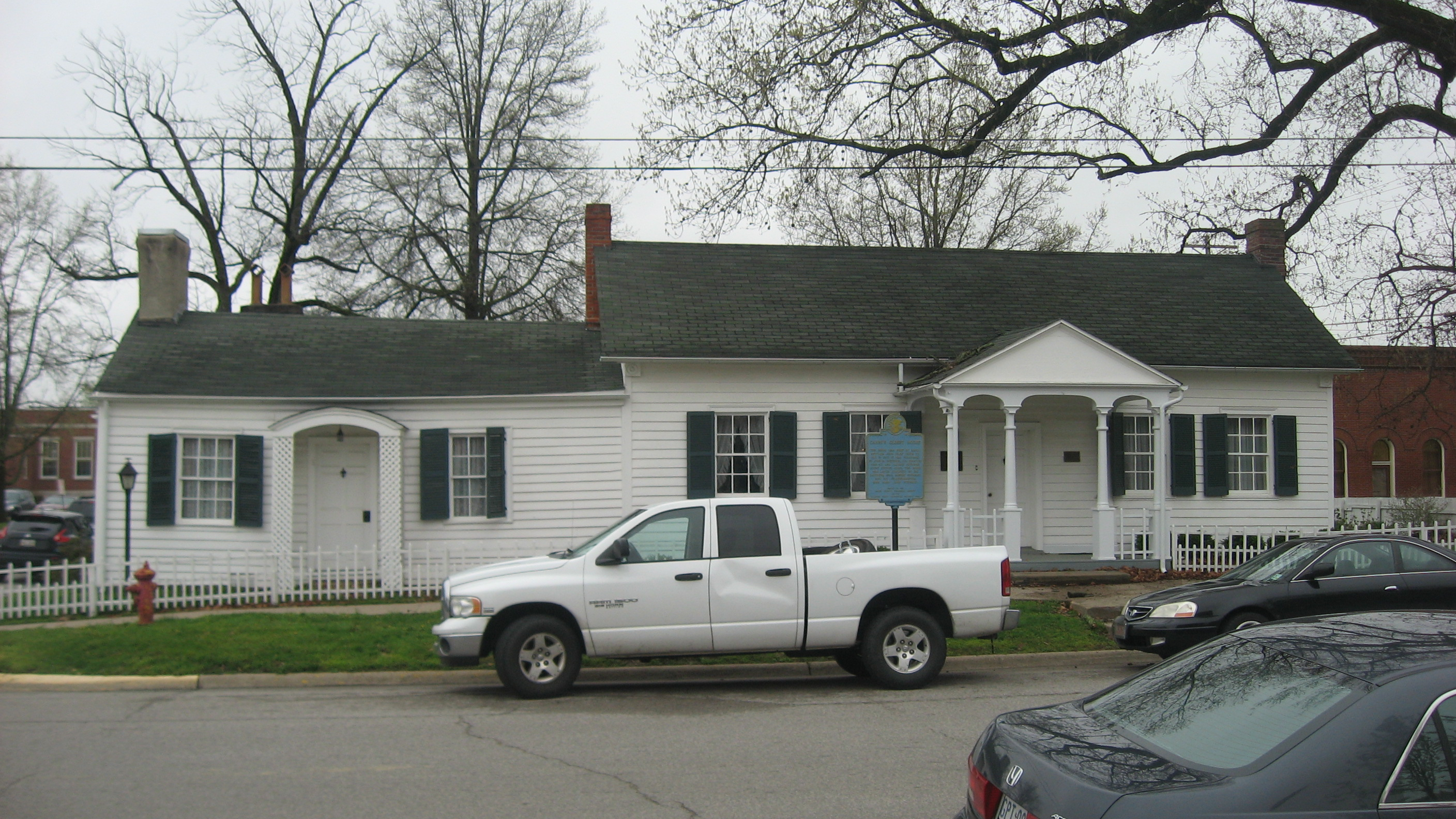
Robinson's house in Carmi

Robinson was elected an associate justice of the Illinois Supreme Court in 1843 and served until his death two months later in Ottawa, Illinois. His interment was in the Old Graveyard, Carmi, Illinois.

U.S. Senate
Preceded by David J. Baker	U.S. senator (Class 2) from Illinois; 1830–1841; Served alongside: Elias Kane, William L.D. Ewing, Richard M. Young	Succeeded by Samuel McRoberts
