= Savageville, Virginia =

- Census-designated place
- Location in Accomack County and the state of Virginia.
- Coordinates: 37°40′57″N 75°45′33″W
- Country: United States
- State: Virginia
- County: Accomack
- Elevation: 16 ft (4.9 m)

Population (2020)
  - Total: 175
- Time zone: UTC−5 (Eastern (EST))
  - Summer (DST): UTC−4 (EDT)
- FIPS code: 51-48776
- GNIS feature ID: 2584915

Savageville is a census-designated place (CDP) in Accomack County, Virginia, United States. It was first listed as a CDP in 2010. Per the 2020 census, the population was 175.

== Geography ==
The CDP lies at an elevation of 16 feet.

== Demographics ==
Historical population
Census	Pop.	Note	%±
2010	175		—
2020	175		0.0%
U.S. Decennial Census; 2010 2020

Savageville was first listed as a census designated place in the 2010 U.S. census.

=== 2020 census ===
Savageville CDP, Virginia – Racial and ethnic composition Note: the US Census treats Hispanic/Latino as an ethnic category. This table excludes Latinos from the racial categories and assigns them to a separate category. Hispanics/Latinos may be of any race.
Race / Ethnicity (NH = Non-Hispanic)	Pop 2010	Pop 2020	% 2010	% 2020
White alone (NH)	37	36	21.14%	20.57%
Black or African American alone (NH)	136	130	77.71%	74.29%
Native American or Alaska Native alone (NH)	0	0	0.00%	0.00%
Asian alone (NH)	1	1	0.57%	0.57%
Pacific Islander alone (NH)	0	0	0.00%	0.00%
Other race alone (NH)	0	2	0.00%	1.14%
Mixed race or Multiracial (NH)	1	2	0.57%	1.14%
Hispanic or Latino (any race)	0	4	0.00%	2.29%
Total	175	175	100.00%	100.00%
