= Hector Craig =

American politician (1775–1842)

Member of the U.S. House of Representatives from New York's 6th district
- In office March 4, 1829 – July 12, 1830
- Preceded by: John Hallock Jr.
- Succeeded by: Samuel W. Eager
- In office March 4, 1823 – March 3, 1825
- Preceded by: Charles Borland Jr.
- Succeeded by: John Hallock Jr.

Personal details
- Born: 1775 Paisley, Scotland, Kingdom of Great Britain
- Died: January 31, 1842 (aged 66–67) Craigsville, New York, U.S.
- Resting place: Caldwell estate in Blooming Grove
- Party: Jacksonian Democratic Party; Jacksonian

Hector Craig (1775 – January 31, 1842) was an American manufacturer and politician from New York. He served two non-consecutive terms in the U.S. House of Representatives from 1823 to 1825, and from 1829 to 1830.

== Life ==
Born in Paisley, Scotland in the Kingdom of Great Britain, he was the son of James Craig. Craig came to the United States in 1790 and settled with his family in Orange County, New York. James Craig founded the hamlet of Craigville in the Town of Blooming Grove, and built a paper mill. Hector Craig later built a grist mill and a saw mill.

In 1797, he married Sarah Chandler, and their daughter was Sarah Agnes Craig who married in 1828 William F. Havemeyer, later three times Mayor of New York City.

=== Congress ===
Hector Craig was elected as a Jacksonian Democratic-Republican to the 18th United States Congress, holding office from March 4, 1823, to March 3, 1825.

He was elected again as a Jacksonian to the 21st United States Congress, holding office from March 4, 1829, to July 12, 1830, when he resigned.

=== Later career and death ===
On March 22, 1831, he was appointed by Secretary of the Treasury Samuel D. Ingham as one of three Commissioners of Insolvency for the Southern District of New York He was Surveyor of the Port of New York from 1833 to 1839, appointed by President Andrew Jackson.

He was buried at a private cemetery on the Caldwell estate in Blooming Grove.

== Notes ==
U.S. House of Representatives
Preceded by Charles Borland Jr.	Member of the U.S. House of Representatives from New York's 6th congressional district 1823–1825	Succeeded by John Hallock Jr.
Preceded by John Hallock Jr.	Member of the U.S. House of Representatives from New York's 6th congressional district 1829–1830	Succeeded by Samuel W. Eager
