= Elias Kane =

American politician (1794–1835)

Elias Kent Kane
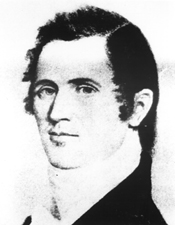

United States Senator from Illinois
- In office March 4, 1825 – December 12, 1835
- Preceded by: John McLean
- Succeeded by: William Ewing

1st Secretary of State of Illinois
- In office 1818–1822
- Governor: Shadrach Bond
- Preceded by: Office established
- Succeeded by: Samuel D. Lockwood

Member of the Illinois House of Representatives

Personal details
- Born: June 7, 1794 New York City, New York, U.S.
- Died: December 12, 1835 (aged 41) Washington, D.C., U.S.
- Party: Jacksonian

Elias Kent Kane (June 7, 1794 – December 12, 1835) was the first Illinois secretary of state and a U.S. senator from Illinois.

== Early life ==
He was born in New York City, to merchant Capt. Elias Kent Kane and Deborah VanSchelluyne of Dutchess County, New York. Young Kane attended public schools, then Yale College, from which he has graduated in the year 1813.

== Career ==
After he studied law and was admitted to the bar, Kane commenced practice in Nashville, Tennessee, and then moved to Kaskaskia, Illinois in 1814.

He became allied with Jesse B. Thomas, a slaveholder who had secured the job of judge of the Territory of Illinois. Like Judge Thomas and his rival Ninian Edwards, Kane was a delegate to the first state constitutional convention in 1818. At the convention, the Thomas/Kane faction unsuccessfully tried to add language permitting slavery in the new state (where it had been forbidden by the Northwest Ordinance of 1787). However, that proposal was defeated by a faction whose leaders included Baptist John Mason Peck, Methodist Peter Cartwright, Quaker James Lemen, publisher Hooper Warren and future governor Edward Coles. Kane claimed ownership of five people as slaves in 1820,

After an unsuccessful 1820 campaign for election to the 17th Congress which featured numerous letters in the Edwardsville Spectator concerning slavery, and which anti-slavery candidate Daniel Pope Cook won, Kane became Illinois' first Secretary of State, and served from 1820 to 1824. In that year, Kane led proslavery forces in the Illinois House of Representatives which attempted to call another constitutional convention, but was again defeated by a coalition led by Governor Coles, U.S. Representative Cook and religious leaders of many denominations. However, fellow legislators twice appointed Kane to the United States Senate. He served from March 4, 1825, until his death in Washington, D.C., in 1835.

== Legacy ==
His body was returned to the family farm in Randolph County, Illinois, but due to continued desecration of the family gravesite, he was reinterred in 1984 (a campaign led by local funeral director, Michael McClure) in Evergreen Cemetery in nearby Chester, in a grave adjacent with that of his sometime political opponent and Illinois' first governor, Shadrach Bond. The Kane family gravesite includes that of his wife, the former Frances Pelletier (1799-1851), two children who died young, and four sons. One son, Elias Kent Kane, Jr. (1822-1853), served in the United States Army. One of Kane's daughters married Illinois governor William H. Bissell, a vocal opponent of slavery. Kane's father (of the same name) is buried in Congressional Cemetery in Washington, D.C., having survived this son by five years and secured his namesake grandson's admission to West Point.

On January 16, 1836, the Illinois legislature formed a new county, Kane, and named it to honor the recently deceased Senator, Elias Kent Kane.

== See also ==
- List of members of the United States Congress who died in office (1790–1899)

Political offices
Preceded by Office created	Illinois Secretary of State; 1818-1822	Succeeded by Samuel D. Lockwood
U.S. Senate
Preceded by John McLean	U.S. senator (Class 3) from Illinois; 1825–1835; Served alongside: Jesse B. Thomas, John McLean, David J. Baker, John M. Robinson	Succeeded by William L.D. Ewing
