= John O. Whitehouse =

American politician

John Osborne Whitehouse
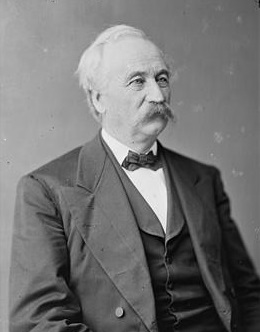

Member of the U.S. House of Representatives from New York's 13th district
- In office March 4, 1873 – March 3, 1877
- Preceded by: Joseph H. Tuthill
- Succeeded by: John H. Ketcham

Personal details
- Born: July 19, 1817 Rochester, New Hampshire, United States
- Died: August 24, 1881 (aged 64) Poughkeepsie, New York, United States
- Resting place: Green-Wood Cemetery, Brooklyn, New York, United States
- Party: Democratic

John Osborne Whitehouse (July 19, 1817 – August 24, 1881) was a U.S. representative from New York.

== Biography ==
John O. Whitehouse was born in Rochester, New Hampshire on July 19, 1817. He received a common-school education and moved to New York City in 1835, where he worked as a clerk. In 1839, he moved to Brooklyn, New York, where he was engaged as a merchant and manufacturer of shoes. He moved to Poughkeepsie, New York, in 1860 and continued the shoe manufacturing business.

Whitehouse was elected as a Democrat to the Forty-third and Forty-fourth Congresses (March 4, 1873 – March 3, 1877). He served as chairman of the Committee on Reform in the Civil Service (Forty-fourth Congress). He was not a candidate for reelection in 1876 to the Forty-fifth Congress. He resumed the shoe manufacturing business. He was also interested in banking and railroading. He was owner of the Daily News 1872–1880.

== Death and burial ==
He died in Poughkeepsie, New York, August 24, 1881. He was interred in Green-Wood Cemetery, Brooklyn, New York.

== Sources ==
- United States Congress. "John O. Whitehouse (id: W000405)". Biographical Directory of the United States Congress.

U.S. House of Representatives
Preceded by Joseph H. Tuthill	Member of the U.S. House of Representatives from New York's 13th congressional district 1873-1877	Succeeded by John H. Ketcham
