= Ode to War =

- by John Whitehouse
- First published in: 1794
- Country: United Kingdom
- Language: English
- Series: Odes Moral and Descriptive
- Subject(s): War

"Ode to War" is a satirical poem on war written in 1794 by Reverend John Whitehouse of St. John's College, Cambridge. It is part of the work Odes Moral and Descriptive.

== Poem ==
Dread Offspring of Tartarian birth,
Whose nodding crest is stain'd with gore,
Whom to some giant-son of Earth,
Strife in strong pangs of childbed bore;
0 War! fierce monster, homicide,
Who marchest on with hideous stride,
Shaking thy spear distilling blood;
Bellona thee, in angry mood,
Taught proud Ambition's spoils to win,
Amidst the loud, conflicting din
Of arms, where Discord's gorgon-featured form
High shakes her flaming torch amidst the martial storm.

Stern God! wolf-hearted, and accursed,
Foster'd by Power, by Rapine nursed,
Oppression ever in thy train,
For hapless man prepares her chain:
A thousand vulture-forms beside
Stalk on before thee; bloated Pride,
Thick-eyed Revenge, his soul on fire,
And Slaughter breathing threatenings dire,
Tumult, and Rage, and Fury fell,
And Cruelty, the imp of hell,
Her heart of adamant! and arm'd her hand
With iron hooks, and cords, and Desolation's brand.

There, where the Battle loudest roars,
Where wide the impurpled deluge pours,
And ghastly Death, his thousands slain,
Whirls his swift chariot o'er the plain,
Rapt in wild Horror's frantic fit,
'Midst the dire scene thou lov'st to sit,
To catch some wretch's parting sigh,
To mark the dimly-glazing eye,
The face into contortions thrown,
Convuls'd: the deep, deep-lengthening groan,
The frequent sob, the agonizing smart,
And nature's dread release, the pang that rends the heart.

Avaunt, from Albion's isle! not there
Thy arms, and maddening car prepare,
Nor bid thy crimson banners fly
Terrific, through the troubled sky;
But stay thee in thy wild career;
Lay by thy glittering shield and spear,
Thy polished casque, and nodding crest,
And let thy sable steeds have rest:
At length, the work of slaughter close,
And give to Europe's sons repose,
Bid the hoarse clangors of the trumpet cease,
And smooth thy wrinkled front to meet the smiles of Peace.

== Other Ode to War's ==
Mark R Slaughter wrote another poem entitled Ode to War in 1957. Brenda Munday Gifford also wrote a poem in reference to the Vietnam War.
