= David J. Baker =

American politician (1792–1869)

David Jewett Baker
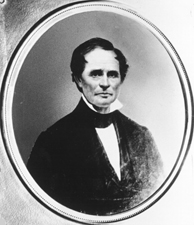

United States Senator from Illinois
- In office November 12, 1830 – December 11, 1830
- Appointed by: Ninian Edwards
- Preceded by: John McLean
- Succeeded by: John M. Robinson

Personal details
- Born: September 7, 1792 East Haddam, Connecticut, U.S.
- Died: August 6, 1869 (aged 76) Alton, Illinois, U.S.
- Resting place: City Cemetery; Alton, Illinois
- Party: Democratic
- Education: Hamilton College

David Jewett Baker (September 7, 1792 – August 6, 1869) was an American politician in the U.S. state of Illinois. He briefly served as a U.S. Senator in 1830.

== Early life ==
Baker was born in East Haddam, Connecticut, the son of Joanna (Minor) and Bayze Baker, and moved with his parents to Ontario County, New York as a child. He attended the common schools and in 1816 he graduated from Hamilton College in Clinton, New York. He studied law and was admitted to the Illinois bar in 1819. The first place he practiced law was Kaskaskia, Illinois.

== Political career ==
He served in various political positions in Illinois, and was probate judge of Randolph County from August 1827 to December 6, 1830, when he resigned to become a Senator. Baker was appointed as a Democrat to the U.S. Senate to fill the vacancy caused by the death of John McLean and served from November 12, 1830, to December 11, 1830, when a successor was elected and qualified. He thus is one of only a few people who have served in Congress for less than a month.

Baker was not a candidate for election in 1830 to fill the vacancy, and was appointed United States Attorney for the district of Illinois in 1833 and served until 1841. He resumed the practice of law, and died in Alton, and was interred in City Cemetery.

U.S. Senate
Preceded by John McLean	U.S. senator (Class 2) from Illinois; 1830; Served alongside: Elias Kane	Succeeded by John McCracken Robinson
