= Warren I. Lee =

American politician

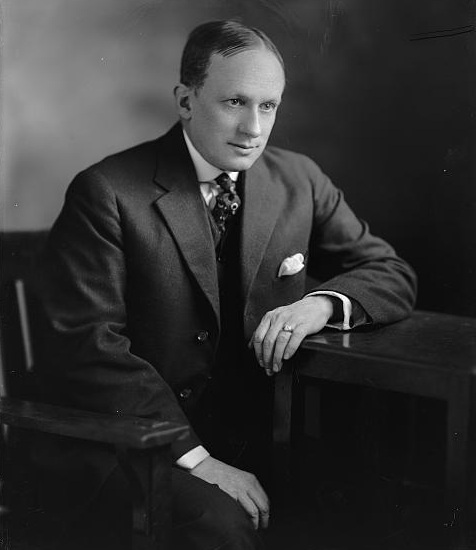

Member of the U.S. House of Representatives from New York's 6th district
- In office March 4, 1921 – March 3, 1923
- Preceded by: Frederick W. Rowe
- Succeeded by: Charles I. Stengle

Personal details
- Born: February 5, 1876 Bartlett, New York, U.S.
- Died: December 5, 1955 (aged 79) Brooklyn, New York City, New York, U.S.
- Party: Republican

Warren Isbell Lee (February 5, 1876 – December 25, 1955) was a U.S. representative from New York.

== Life ==
He was born in Bartlett, Oneida County, New York. In 1894 he graduated from Colgate Academy in Hamilton, New York. He graduated from Hamilton College in 1899, and from New York Law School in 1901. He was admitted to the bar in 1901, and practiced in New York City.

He was a member of the New York State Assembly (Kings Co., 18th D.) in 1906, 1907, 1908, 1909, 1910. He was an assistant district attorney of Kings County from 1912 to 1914, First Deputy New York State Comptroller from 1914 to 1917, one of the counsel to the state Public Service Commission from 1917 to 1919, and a Trustee of Hamilton College from 1917 to 1921.

He was again a member of the State Assembly (Kings Co., 21st D.) in 1920 and a delegate to the Republican state conventions in 1920, 1922, 1924 and 1926.

Lee was elected as a Republican to the 67th United States Congress, holding office from March 4, 1921, to March 3, 1923. Afterwards he resumed the practice of law, and was a director of Flatbush National Bank.

He died on December 25, 1955, in Brooklyn and was buried at the Green-Wood Cemetery there.

New York State Assembly
Preceded by Charles H. Fuller	New York State Assembly; Kings County, 18th District; 1906–1910	Succeeded by Almeth W. Hoff
Preceded by Wilfred E. Youker	New York State Assembly; Kings County, 21st District; 1920	Succeeded by Walter F. Clayton
U.S. House of Representatives
Preceded by Frederick W. Rowe	Member of the U.S. House of Representatives from New York's 6th congressional district 1921–1923	Succeeded by Charles I. Stengle
