= John McLean (Illinois politician) =

Illinois politician (1791–1830)

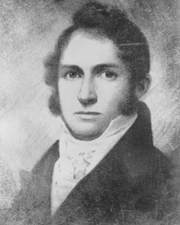

United States Senator from Illinois
- In office November 23, 1824 – March 3, 1825
- Preceded by: Ninian Edwards
- Succeeded by: Elias Kane
- In office March 4, 1829 – October 14, 1830
- Preceded by: Jesse B. Thomas
- Succeeded by: David J. Baker

Member of the U.S. House of Representatives from Illinois's at-large congressional district
- In office December 3, 1818 – March 3, 1819
- Preceded by: Inaugural Holder
- Succeeded by: Daniel P. Cook

2nd and 6th Speaker of the Illinois House of Representatives
- In office December 4, 1820 – December 2, 1822
- Preceded by: John Messinger
- Succeeded by: William Alexander
- In office December 4, 1826 – March 4, 1829
- Preceded by: David Blackwell
- Succeeded by: William Lee D. Ewing

Personal details
- Born: February 4, 1791 Greensboro, North Carolina, U.S.
- Died: October 14, 1830 (aged 39) Shawneetown, Illinois, U.S.
- Party: Democratic-Republican; Democratic
- Profession: Lawyer

John McLean (February 4, 1791 – October 14, 1830) was a United States representative and a Senator from Illinois. He was the brother of Finis McLean and uncle of James David Walker.

== Biography ==
Born near Guilford Court House (now Greensboro), Guilford County, North Carolina, February 4, 1791, McLean moved with his parents to Logan County, Kentucky in 1795. He moved to Illinois Territory in 1815. After studying law, he was admitted to the bar and commenced practice in Shawneetown, Gallatin County, Illinois.

== Political career ==
When Illinois was admitted as a State into the Union, McLean was elected to the Fifteenth Congress and served from December 3, 1818, to March 3, 1819. He failed to be re-elected in 1818 to the Sixteenth Congress. He was also an unsuccessful candidate for congress in the 1820 and 1822 elections. He was elected to the Illinois State House of Representatives in 1820, 1826, and 1828, and served as speaker. In 1824, McLean was elected to the United States Senate to fill the vacancy created by the resignation of Ninian Edwards and served from November 23, 1824 to March 3, 1825. He was unsuccessful in a bid for re-election, not managing to get more than 12 votes of the 27 needed in the legislature through 10 ballots, but resumed the practice of law. He was again elected to the United States Senate and served from March 4, 1829, until his death, aged 39, in Shawneetown, Illinois in 1830. He was interred in Westwood Cemetery, near Shawneetown.

== Legacy ==
McLean County, Illinois is named after him.

== See also ==
- List of members of the United States Congress who died in office (1790–1899)

U.S. House of Representatives
Preceded by State entered union	Member of the U.S. House of Representatives from Illinois's at-large congressional district December 3, 1818 – March 3, 1819	Succeeded by Daniel P. Cook
U.S. Senate
Preceded by Ninian Edwards	U.S. senator (Class 3) from Illinois; 1824–1825; Served alongside: Jesse B. Thomas	Succeeded by Elias K. Kane
Preceded by Jesse B. Thomas	U.S. senator (Class 2) from Illinois; 1829–1830; Served alongside: Elias K. Kane	Succeeded by David J. Baker
