= Selah Tuthill =

American politician

Personal details
- Born: October 26, 1771 Blooming Grove, Province of New York, British America
- Died: September 7, 1821 (aged 49) Goshen, New York, U.S.
- Resting place: Marlboro, New York
- Party: Democratic-Republican
- Relatives: Joseph H. Tuthill (nephew)

Selah Tuthill (October 26, 1771 – September 7, 1821) was an American politician from New York.

== Life ==
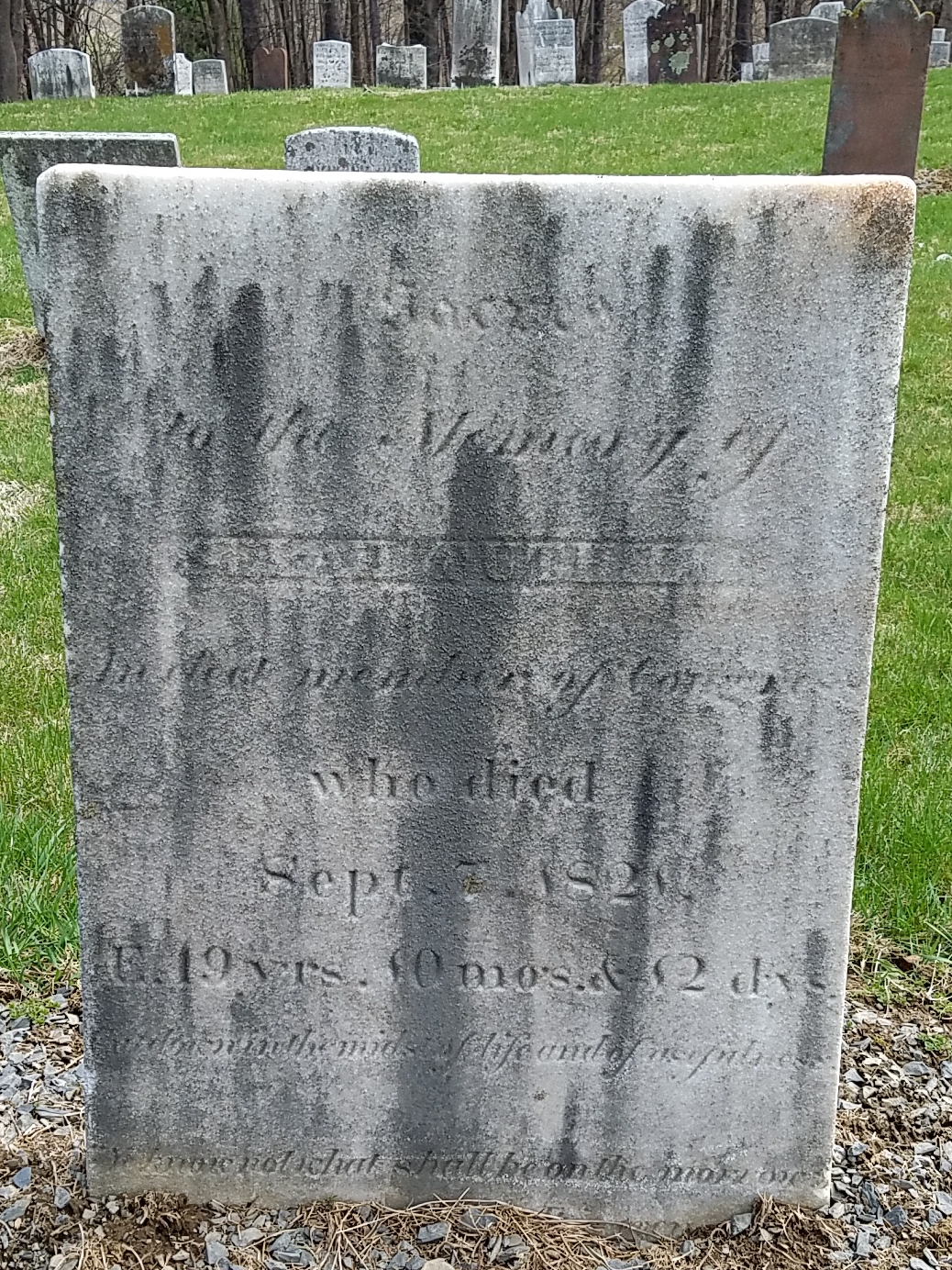
Tuthill's grave in Marlboro

Tuthill attended public and private schools.

He was a member of the New York State Assembly from Ulster County in 1804–05, and from Orange County in 1820.

In April 1821, Tuthill was elected to the 17th United States Congress Congress but died before he could take his seat. The congressional elections were held this time after the congressional term had already begun on March 4, and it is uncertain if Tuthill ever received his credentials. Congress met on December 3, 1821, and Charles Borland, Jr., who had been elected in the meanwhile in a special election, took this seat.

He was a Freemason. He was a founding member of Columbia Lodge No 207 in New Paltz, New York

Tuthill was interred in Riverside Cemetery in Marlboro, New York.

Congressman Joseph H. Tuthill was his nephew.

=== Electoral history ===
New York's 6th congressional district election, 1821
Party	Candidate	Votes	%
Democratic-Republican	Selah Tuthill	2,156	61.67
Democratic-Republican	James W. Wilkin	1,340	38.33
Total votes		3,496	100.00
Democratic-Republican hold			
