= Charles Borland Jr. =

American politician

Member of the U.S. House of Representatives from New York's 6th district
- In office November 8, 1821 – March 3, 1823
- Preceded by: Selah Tuthill
- Succeeded by: Hector Craig

Member of the New York State Assembly
- In office 1820–1821

Personal details
- Born: June 29, 1786 Minisink, New York, US
- Died: February 23, 1852 (aged 65) Ward's Bridge, New York, US
- Party: Democratic Party
- Spouse: Isabella Hill Borland
- Children: 5
- Education: Union College
- Profession: Attorney; Politician; District attorney

Charles Borland Jr. (June 29, 1786 – February 23, 1852) was an American politician and a United States representative from New York.

== Biography ==
Born in Minisink, New York, Borland graduated from Union College in 1811 after studying law and was admitted the bar and practice law in Montgomery, New York. He was president of the board of trustees of Montgomery for ten years and a member of the New York State Assembly from 1820 to 1821. In 1821, he was elected from the sixth district as a Republican to the Seventeenth Congress to fill the vacancy caused by the death of Selah Tuthill, serving until 1823. After his term, he returned as a member of the New York State Assembly in 1836 and Orange County District Attorney from 1835 to 1852. In the 21st century, his beautiful home, The Borland House, operates as a bed and breakfast, maintaining the historic features of the building and to be enjoyed by visitors.

== Career ==
Borland was a member of the New York State Assembly in 1820–21.

He was elected as a Democratic-Republican to the 17th United States Congress, to fill the vacancy caused by the death of Selah Tuthill, holding office from December 3, 1821, to March 3, 1823.

He was district attorney of Orange County from 1835 to 1841; and again a member of the State Assembly in 1836. He was President of the Board of Trustees of the village of Montgomery for ten years.

Charles was a man of many talents and moods. He practiced and taught law, oversaw the construction of the Erie Canal beginning in 1817 at the behest of his friend Governor George Clinton, presided over the Village of Montgomery Trustees for 10 years, represented the area in the State Assembly (1820-21, 1836) and US Congress (1821-23) and served as District Attorney of Orange County (1835-41). He displayed his combative side as one of the election inspectors for the Town of Montgomery. During the election of 1819 he was at odds with other inspectors, asserting that some voters were not eligible to vote because they were not owners of sufficient property. This led to a “personal altercation” with local lawyer Charles Ruggles. Ultimately the other inspectors prevailed and the votes allowed.

== Death ==
Borland died in Ward's Bridge, New York, on February 23, 1852. He is interred at Riverside Cemetery, Montgomery.

U.S. House of Representatives
| Preceded by Selah Tuthill | Member of the U.S. House of Representatives from New York's 6th congressional district December 3, 1821 – March 3, 1823 | Succeeded by Hector Craig |
