= Ridgebury, New York =

- Hamlet
- Location within New York
- Coordinates: 41°23′11″N 74°27′13″W
- Country: United States
- State: New York
- County: Orange
- Time zone: UTC−5 (EST)
  - Summer (DST): UTC−4 (EDT)

Ridgebury is one of the eight hamlets in the town of Wawayanda, New York, United States. The hamlet and its township are located in Orange County, approximately 65 miles north of New York City.

The community's name originally was spelled "Ridgeberry", so named for the berries which grew on the ridge upon which the town site is located.

In the spring of 2008, the area's natural bodies of water, including Catlin Creek and Ridgebury Lake, were infested with groups of northern snakehead, a highly predatory fish that has recently been found unintentionally spreading around the United States. In Ridgebury, the snakeheads have been removed with poisoning by the DEC, and all water has been restocked with native species.
