= List of counties in Illinois =

Counties of Illinois
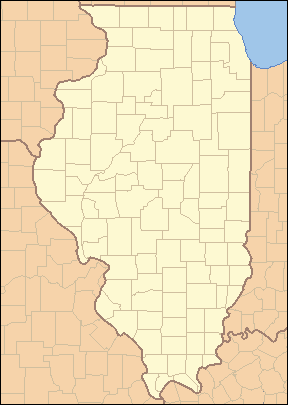
- Location: State of Illinois
- Number: 102
- Populations: 3,588 (Hardin) – 5,194,625 (Cook)
- Areas: 172 square miles (450 km^{2}) (Putnam) – 1,186 square miles (3,070 km^{2}) (McLean)
- Government: County government
- Subdivisions: 255 Precincts 1,426 Townships

There are 102 counties in Illinois. The most populous of these is Cook County, the second-most populous county in the United States and the home of Chicago, while the least populous is Hardin County. The largest by land area is McLean County, while the smallest is Putnam County. Illinois's FIPS state code is 17 and its postal abbreviation is IL.

What is now Illinois was claimed as part of Illinois County, Virginia, between 1778 and 1782. Modern-day county formation dates to 1790 when the area was part of the Northwest Territory; two counties — St. Clair and Knox — were created at that time. Knox would later become a county in Indiana and is unrelated to the current Knox County in Illinois, while St. Clair would become the oldest county in Illinois. Successive territorial governments created 15 counties by the time Illinois achieved statehood in 1818. The last county created in the state, Ford County, was created by the Illinois government in 1859.

Most counties in Illinois were named after early American leaders, especially of the American Revolutionary War, as well as soldiers from the Battle of Tippecanoe and the War of 1812. Some are named after natural features or counties in other states. Some are named for early Illinois leaders. Two counties are named for Native American tribes, and one bears the name of a plant used as a food source by Native Americans.

While it does have a Lincoln city, Illinois does not have a county named after Abraham Lincoln; it does, however, have a Douglas County (founded 1859) named after his political rival Stephen A. Douglas. It also has Calhoun County (founded 1825), named after John C. Calhoun, outspoken for his pro-slavery and pro-southern views in the years preceding the American Civil War. Several of the counties are named after Southerners, reflecting the fact that Illinois was for a short time part of Virginia, and settled in its early years by many Southerners. No counties are named after heroes of the Civil War, mainly because the counties were all named before that war. The state does have a Lee County (founded 1839) named after the American Revolution's Henry Lee III, the father of Robert E. Lee from the Civil War, who at one time served in Illinois. Illinois also has two counties named after the same person, the prominent early 19th century New York governor and presidential candidate DeWitt Clinton (DeWitt County, and Clinton County).

Information on the FIPS county code, county seat, year of establishment, origin, etymology, population, area and map of each county is included in the table below.

== Counties ==
Note: the links in the FIPS County Code column are to the United States Census Bureau page for that county.

County	FIPS code	County seat	Est.	Origin	Etymology	Population	Area	Map
Adams County	001	Quincy	January 13, 1825	Pike County	John Quincy Adams (1767–1848), sixth President of the United States	64,267	855 sq mi (2,214 km^{2})	State map highlighting Adams County
Alexander County	003	Cairo	March 4, 1819	Union County	William M. Alexander, settler and state representative in the Illinois General Assembly	4,570	236 sq mi (611 km^{2})	State map highlighting Alexander County
Bond County	005	Greenville	January 4, 1817	Crawford County, Edwards County, and Madison County	Shadrach Bond (1773–1832), first Governor of Illinois	16,959	380 sq mi (984 km^{2})	State map highlighting Bond County
Boone County	007	Belvidere	March 4, 1837	Winnebago County	Daniel Boone (1734–1820), trailblazer of the Wilderness Road in Kentucky	53,568	280 sq mi (725 km^{2})	State map highlighting Boone County
Brown County	009	Mount Sterling	February 1, 1839	Schuyler County	Jacob Brown (1775–1828), successful War of 1812 army officer responsible for Great Lakes defenses	6,401	305 sq mi (790 km^{2})	State map highlighting Brown County
Bureau County	011	Princeton	April 3, 1837	Putnam County	Pierre de Bureo, Frenchman, North American fur trader	32,510	869 sq mi (2,251 km^{2})	State map highlighting Bureau County
Calhoun County	013	Hardin	January 10, 1825	Pike County	John C. Calhoun (1782–1850), South Carolina senator and seventh Vice President of the United States	4,300	253 sq mi (655 km^{2})	State map highlighting Calhoun County
Carroll County	015	Mount Carroll	February 22, 1839	Jo Daviess	Charles Carroll of Carrollton (1737–1832), signed the Declaration of Independence on behalf of Maryland	15,419	445 sq mi (1,153 km^{2})	State map highlighting Carroll County
Cass County	017	Virginia	April 17, 1837	Morgan County	Lewis Cass (1782–1866), second governor of Michigan Territory, fourteenth United States Secretary of War	12,463	375 sq mi (971 km^{2})	State map highlighting Cass County
Champaign County	019	Urbana	February 20, 1833	Vermilion County	Champaign County, Ohio, which took its name from the French for "open level country"	209,972	996 sq mi (2,580 km^{2})	State map highlighting Champaign County
Christian County	021	Taylorville	February 15, 1839	Sangamon County	Christian County, Kentucky, which was named after William Christian	33,443	709 sq mi (1,836 km^{2})	State map highlighting Christian County
Clark County	023	Marshall	March 22, 1819	Crawford County	George Rogers Clark (1752–1818), highest-ranking officer in the Northwest Territory during the American Revolution	15,114	501 sq mi (1,298 km^{2})	State map highlighting Clark County
Clay County	025	Louisville	December 23, 1824	Wayne, Lawrence, Fayette, and Crawford County	Henry Clay (1777–1852), Kentucky legislator who negotiated the Missouri Compromise	12,793	468 sq mi (1,212 km^{2})	State map highlighting Clay County
Clinton County	027	Carlyle	December 27, 1824	Washington, Bond, and Fayette County	DeWitt Clinton (1769–1828), Governor of New York, responsible for the construction of the Erie Canal	37,128	474 sq mi (1,228 km^{2})	State map highlighting Clinton County
Coles County	029	Charleston	December 25, 1830	Clark and Edgar County	Edward Coles (1786–1868), second Governor of Illinois, responsible for the abolition of slavery in Illinois	46,607	508 sq mi (1,316 km^{2})	State map highlighting Coles County
Cook County	031	Chicago	January 15, 1831	Putnam County	Daniel Pope Cook (1794–1827), politician and first Attorney General of Illinois	5,194,625	944 sq mi (2,445 km^{2})	State map highlighting Cook County
Crawford County	033	Robinson	December 31, 1816	Edwards County	William H. Crawford (1772–1834), ninth United States Secretary of War, seventh Secretary of the Treasury	18,648	443 sq mi (1,147 km^{2})	State map highlighting Crawford County
Cumberland County	035	Toledo	May 1, 1843	Coles County	Disputed: Cumberland Road, which entered the county; Cumberland, Maryland; or Cumberland River in Kentucky	10,208	345 sq mi (894 km^{2})	State map highlighting Cumberland County
DeKalb County	037	Sycamore	May 1, 1837	Kane County	Johann de Kalb (1721–1780), German officer in the Continental Army who fought alongside Gilbert du Motier, marquis de Lafayette	101,835	631 sq mi (1,634 km^{2})	State map highlighting DeKalb County
DeWitt County	039	Clinton	March 1, 1839	Macon and McLean County	DeWitt Clinton (1769–1828), Governor of New York, responsible for the construction of the Erie Canal	15,118	397 sq mi (1,028 km^{2})	State map highlighting DeWitt County
Douglas County	041	Tuscola	March 21, 1859	Coles County	Stephen A. Douglas (1813–1861), prominent Illinois Democrat who engaged in debates with Abraham Lincoln	19,880	416 sq mi (1,077 km^{2})	State map highlighting Douglas County
DuPage County	043	Wheaton	February 29, 1839	Cook County	DuPage River	934,298	327 sq mi (847 km^{2})	State map highlighting DuPage County
Edgar County	045	Paris	January 3, 1823	Clark County	John Edgar (c. 1750–1832), Illinois delegate to the Northwest Territory legislature; at the time, wealthiest man in Illinois	16,323	623 sq mi (1,614 km^{2})	State map highlighting Edgar County
Edwards County	047	Albion	November 28, 1814	Gallatin County and Madison County	Ninian Edwards (1775–1833), third Governor of the State of Illinois and only governor of the Illinois Territory	5,898	222 sq mi (575 km^{2})	State map highlighting Edwards County
Effingham County	049	Effingham	February 15, 1831	Fayette and Crawford County	Thomas Howard, 3rd Earl of Effingham, military officer who resigned from the British Army to avoid fighting the American colonies	34,519	478 sq mi (1,238 km^{2})	State map highlighting Effingham County
Fayette County	051	Vandalia	February 14, 1821	Bond, Wayne, Clark, Jefferson, and Crawford County	Gilbert du Motier, marquis de Lafayette (1757–1834), French military officer who was a key factor in the American and French Revolutions.	20,790	716 sq mi (1,854 km^{2})	State map highlighting Fayette County
Ford County	053	Paxton	April 5, 1859	Vermilion County	Thomas Ford (1800–1850), eighth Governor of Illinois; served during the Illinois Mormon War	13,216	485 sq mi (1,256 km^{2})	State map highlighting Ford County
Franklin County	055	Benton	January 2, 1818	White County and Gallatin County	Benjamin Franklin (1706–1790), prolific writer, inventor, and politician; key factor in the American Revolution	36,916	408 sq mi (1,057 km^{2})	State map highlighting Franklin County
Fulton County	057	Lewistown	January 28, 1823	Pike County	Robert Fulton (1765–1815), inventor of the steamboat	32,901	865 sq mi (2,240 km^{2})	State map highlighting Fulton County
Gallatin County	059	Shawneetown	September 14, 1812	Randolph County	Albert Gallatin (1761–1849), fourth and longest-serving United States Secretary of the Treasury	4,616	322 sq mi (834 km^{2})	State map highlighting Gallatin County
Greene County	061	Carrollton	January 20, 1821	Madison County	Nathanael Greene (1742–1786), major general in the Continental Army	11,313	543 sq mi (1,406 km^{2})	State map highlighting Greene County
Grundy County	063	Morris	February 17, 1841	LaSalle County	Felix Grundy (1777–1840), Tennessean senator who served as the thirteenth United States Attorney General	54,052	418 sq mi (1,083 km^{2})	State map highlighting Grundy County
Hamilton County	065	McLeansboro	February 8, 1821	White County	Alexander Hamilton (1755–1804), first United States Secretary of the Treasury	7,859	434 sq mi (1,124 km^{2})	State map highlighting Hamilton County
Hancock County	067	Carthage	January 13, 1825	Adams County	John Hancock (1737–1793), first governor of the Massachusetts colony and president of the Second Continental Congress	16,803	793 sq mi (2,054 km^{2})	State map highlighting Hancock County
Hardin County	069	Elizabethtown	August 5, 1839	Pope County	Hardin County, Kentucky, which was named after John Hardin	3,588	177 sq mi (458 km^{2})	State map highlighting Hardin County
Henderson County	071	Oquawka	January 20, 1841	Warren County	Henderson County, Kentucky, which was named after Richard Henderson	5,984	378 sq mi (979 km^{2})	State map highlighting Henderson County
Henry County	073	Cambridge	January 13, 1825	Fulton County	Patrick Henry (1736–1799), American Revolutionary War figure; first and sixth Governor of Virginia	48,095	822 sq mi (2,129 km^{2})	State map highlighting Henry County
Iroquois County	075	Watseka	February 26, 1833	Vermilion County	Iroquois Native Americans	26,150	1,117 sq mi (2,893 km^{2})	State map highlighting Iroquois County
Jackson County	077	Murphysboro	April 1, 1816	Randolph County and Johnson County	Andrew Jackson (1767–1845), seventh President of the United States, United States Senator from Tennessee, and general in the War of 1812	52,501	584 sq mi (1,513 km^{2})	State map highlighting Jackson County
Jasper County	079	Newton	February 15, 1831	Clay and Crawford County	Sgt. William Jasper (c. 1750–1779), American Revolutionary War soldier popularized by Parson Weems	9,032	494 sq mi (1,279 km^{2})	State map highlighting Jasper County
Jefferson County	081	Mount Vernon	March 26, 1819	Edwards and White County	Thomas Jefferson (1743–1826), third President of the United States, second Vice President of the United States, Governor of Virginia, and one of the foremost Founding Fathers of the United States	36,147	571 sq mi (1,479 km^{2})	State map highlighting Jefferson County
Jersey County	083	Jerseyville	August 5, 1839	Greene County	State of New Jersey, from which many early settlers hailed	21,160	369 sq mi (956 km^{2})	State map highlighting Jersey County
Jo Daviess County	085	Galena	February 17, 1827	Henry, Mercer, and Putnam County	Joseph Hamilton Daveiss (1774–1811), commander of the Indiana Dragoons at the Battle of Tippecanoe	21,594	600 sq mi (1,554 km^{2})	State map highlighting Jo Daviess County
Johnson County	087	Vienna	September 14, 1812	Randolph County	Richard Mentor Johnson (c. 1780–1850), ninth Vice President of the United States and United States Senator from Kentucky	13,363	343 sq mi (888 km^{2})	State map highlighting Johnson County
Kane County	089	Geneva	January 16, 1836	LaSalle County	Elias Kane (1794–1835), United States Senator from Illinois	525,757	519 sq mi (1,344 km^{2})	State map highlighting Kane County
Kankakee County	091	Kankakee	April 5, 1853	Iroquois and Will County	Kankakee River	105,525	676 sq mi (1,751 km^{2})	State map highlighting Kankakee County
Kendall County	093	Yorkville	February 19, 1841	LaSalle and Kane County	Amos Kendall (1789–1869), United States Postmaster General under Presidents Andrew Jackson and Martin Van Buren	145,470	320 sq mi (829 km^{2})	State map highlighting Kendall County
Knox County	095	Galesburg	January 13, 1825	Fulton County	Gen. Henry Knox (1750–1806), American Revolutionary War general and first United States Secretary of War	47,767	716 sq mi (1,854 km^{2})	State map highlighting Knox County
Lake County	097	Waukegan	March 1, 1839	McHenry County	Lake Michigan	719,339	443 sq mi (1,147 km^{2})	State map highlighting Lake County
LaSalle County	099	Ottawa	January 15, 1831	Putnam and Tazewell County	Sieur de la Salle (1643–1687), French explorer of the Great Lakes	107,773	1,135 sq mi (2,940 km^{2})	State map highlighting LaSalle County
Lawrence County	101	Lawrenceville	January 16, 1821	Crawford and Edwards County	Capt. James Lawrence (1781–1813), commander of the USS Chesapeake in the War of 1812. Famous for his command "Don't give up the ship!"	13,790	372 sq mi (963 km^{2})	State map highlighting Lawrence County
Lee County	103	Dixon	February 27, 1839	Ogle County	"Light Horse" Henry Lee III (1756–1818), American Revolutionary War officer and ninth Governor of Virginia	32,914	724 sq mi (1,875 km^{2})	State map highlighting Lee County
Livingston County	105	Pontiac	February 27, 1837	LaSalle and McLean County	Edward Livingston (1764–1836), prominent jurist, Congressman from New York and Louisiana, and U.S. Secretary of State from 1831-33	35,057	1,043 sq mi (2,701 km^{2})	State map highlighting Livingston County
Logan County	107	Lincoln	February 15, 1839	Sangamon County	John Logan, country doctor and early settler, and the father of John A. Logan	27,182	618 sq mi (1,601 km^{2})	State map highlighting Logan County
Macon County	115	Decatur	January 19, 1829	Shelby County	Nathaniel Macon (1758–1837), sixth Speaker of the United States House of Representatives and United States Senator from North Carolina	99,300	580 sq mi (1,502 km^{2})	State map highlighting Macon County
Macoupin County	117	Carlinville	January 17, 1829	Greene County	Native American word macoupin, meaning "American lotus"	43,748	862 sq mi (2,233 km^{2})	State map highlighting Macoupin County
Madison County	119	Edwardsville	September 14, 1812	St. Clair County and Randolph County	James Madison (1751–1836), fourth President of the United States and principal author of the Constitution of the United States	263,110	716 sq mi (1,854 km^{2})	State map highlighting Madison County
Marion County	121	Salem	January 24, 1823	Fayette and Jefferson County	Francis Marion (c. 1732–1795), general in the American Revolutionary War known as "The Swamp Fox"	36,382	572 sq mi (1,481 km^{2})	State map highlighting Marion County
Marshall County	123	Lacon	January 19, 1839	Putnam County	John Marshall (1755–1835), fourth and longest-serving Chief Justice of the United States, wrote opinion in Marbury v. Madison establishing the principle of judicial review	11,473	386 sq mi (1,000 km^{2})	State map highlighting Marshall County
Mason County	125	Havana	January 20, 1841	Tazewell and Menard County	Named after Mason County, Kentucky, itself named after George Mason	12,411	539 sq mi (1,396 km^{2})	State map highlighting Mason County
Massac County	127	Metropolis	February 8, 1843	Pope and Johnson County	Fort Massac, a colonial-era fort on the Ohio River	13,502	237 sq mi (614 km^{2})	State map highlighting Massac County
McDonough County	109	Macomb	January 25, 1826	Schuyler County	Commodore Thomas Macdonough (1783–1825), commander of American naval forces at the Battle of Plattsburgh	25,916	589 sq mi (1,526 km^{2})	State map highlighting McDonough County
McHenry County	111	Woodstock	January 16, 1836	Cook and LaSalle County	Major William McHenry (c. 1771–1835), officer during several campaigns against Native Americans and was a member of the Illinois legislature	317,751	603 sq mi (1,562 km^{2})	State map highlighting McHenry County
McLean County	113	Bloomington	December 25, 1830	Tazewell County	John McLean (1791–1830), United States Representative and United States Senator from Illinois (the latter from 1824–25 and 1829–30)	171,419	1,183 sq mi (3,064 km^{2})	State map highlighting McLean County
Menard County	129	Petersburg	February 15, 1839	Sangamon County	Pierre Menard (1766–1844), prominent early settler and first Lieutenant Governor of Illinois	11,863	314 sq mi (813 km^{2})	State map highlighting Menard County
Mercer County	131	Aledo	January 13, 1825	Schuyler County	Hugh Mercer (1726–1777), British officer in the Seven Years' War and general in the Continental Army during the American Revolutionary War	15,229	561 sq mi (1,453 km^{2})	State map highlighting Mercer County
Monroe County	133	Waterloo	June 1, 1816	Randolph County and St. Clair County	James Monroe (1758–1831), seventh United States Secretary of State, eighth United States Secretary of War, Governor of Virginia, and fifth President of the United States	34,840	385 sq mi (997 km^{2})	State map highlighting Monroe County
Montgomery County	135	Hillsboro	February 12, 1821	Bond and Madison County	Gen. Richard Montgomery (1738–1775), brigadier-general in the Continental Army who led the unsuccessful invasion of Canada	28,076	703 sq mi (1,821 km^{2})	State map highlighting Montgomery County
Morgan County	137	Jacksonville	January 31, 1823	Sangamon County	Gen. Daniel Morgan (1736–1802), successful tactician in the American Revolutionary War and later United States Representative from Virginia	32,515	568 sq mi (1,471 km^{2})	State map highlighting Morgan County
Moultrie County	139	Sullivan	February 16, 1843	Shelby and Macon County	Gen. William Moultrie (1730–1805), American Revolutionary War general and Governor of South Carolina	14,371	335 sq mi (868 km^{2})	State map highlighting Moultrie County
Ogle County	141	Oregon	January 16, 1836	Jo Daviess	Joseph Ogle (1737–1821), early settler in southwest Illinois, who helped found the first Methodist church in Illinois	51,399	758 sq mi (1,963 km^{2})	State map highlighting Ogle County
Peoria County	143	Peoria	January 13, 1825	Fulton County	The Peoria Native American tribe	178,553	618 sq mi (1,601 km^{2})	State map highlighting Peoria County
Perry County	145	Pinckneyville	January 29, 1827	Randolph and Jackson County	Cmdre. Oliver Hazard Perry (1785–1819), American naval officer who led the victorious American forces at the Battle of Lake Erie	20,160	441 sq mi (1,142 km^{2})	State map highlighting Perry County
Piatt County	147	Monticello	January 27, 1841	DeWitt and Macon County	James A. Piatt, the patriarch of a prominent settler family in the early history of the county	16,791	439 sq mi (1,137 km^{2})	State map highlighting Piatt County
Pike County	149	Pittsfield	January 31, 1821	Madison, Bond, and Clark County	Zebulon Pike (1779–1813), early explorer of the American Southwest, namesake of Pikes Peak	14,231	831 sq mi (2,152 km^{2})	State map highlighting Pike County
Pope County	151	Golconda	April 1, 1816	Gallatin and Johnson County	Nathaniel Pope (1784–1850), early Delegate from Illinois Territory to Congress and judge on the United States District Court for the District of Illinois	3,672	368 sq mi (953 km^{2})	State map highlighting Pope County
Pulaski County	153	Mound City	June 5, 1843	Alexander and Johnson County	Gen. Casimir Pulaski (1745–1779), Polish American general of cavalry in the American Revolutionary War	4,820	199 sq mi (515 km^{2})	State map highlighting Pulaski County
Putnam County	155	Hennepin	January 13, 1825	Fulton County	Gen. Israel Putnam (1718–1790), commander of American forces at the Battle of Bunker Hill	5,619	160 sq mi (414 km^{2})	State map highlighting Putnam County
Randolph County	157	Chester	October 5, 1795	St. Clair County	Edmund Randolph (1753–1813), first Attorney General of the United States, and briefly United States Secretary of State	29,921	575 sq mi (1,489 km^{2})	State map highlighting Randolph County
Richland County	159	Olney	June 7, 1841	Clay and Lawrence County	Richland County, Ohio, itself named for its rich soil	15,219	360 sq mi (932 km^{2})	State map highlighting Richland County
Rock Island County	161	Rock Island	February 9, 1831	Jo Daviess County	Rock Island	141,869	427 sq mi (1,106 km^{2})	State map highlighting Rock Island County
Saline County	165	Harrisburg	August 2, 1847	Gallatin County	The Saline River and salt springs in the county	22,772	379 sq mi (982 km^{2})	State map highlighting Saline County
Sangamon County	167	Springfield	January 30, 1821	Madison and Bond County	Sangamon River	194,170	868 sq mi (2,248 km^{2})	State map highlighting Sangamon County
Schuyler County	169	Rushville	January 13, 1825	Pike and Fulton County	Gen. Philip Schuyler (1733–1804), American Revolutionary War general and United States Senator from New York	6,657	437 sq mi (1,132 km^{2})	State map highlighting Schuyler County
Scott County	171	Winchester	February 16, 1839	Morgan County	Scott County, Kentucky, itself named after Charles Scott	4,866	250 sq mi (647 km^{2})	State map highlighting Scott County
Shelby County	173	Shelbyville	January 23, 1827	Fayette County	Isaac Shelby (1750–1826), soldier in the American Revolutionary War and War of 1812; first and fifth Governor of Kentucky	20,576	758 sq mi (1,963 km^{2})	State map highlighting Shelby County
St. Clair County	163	Belleville	April 27, 1790	original two counties	Arthur St. Clair (1737–1818), major general in the American Revolutionary War and first Governor of the Northwest Territory	250,708	657 sq mi (1,702 km^{2})	State map highlighting St. Clair County
Stark County	175	Toulon	March 2, 1839	Knox and Putnam County	Gen. John Stark (1728–1822), general in the American Revolutionary War, called the "Hero of Bennington"	5,319	288 sq mi (746 km^{2})	State map highlighting Stark County
Stephenson County	177	Freeport	March 4, 1837	Jo Daviess and Winnebago County	Benjamin Stephenson (1769–1822), representative of Illinois Territory in the United States Congress from 1814 to 1816	43,220	564 sq mi (1,461 km^{2})	State map highlighting Stephenson County
Tazewell County	179	Pekin	January 31, 1827	Sangamon County	Littleton Waller Tazewell (1774–1860), United States Senator from (and later governor of) Virginia	130,049	646 sq mi (1,673 km^{2})	State map highlighting Tazewell County
Union County	181	Jonesboro	January 2, 1818	Johnson County	The union of the United States	16,656	413 sq mi (1,070 km^{2})	State map highlighting Union County
Vermilion County	183	Danville	January 18, 1826	Edgar County	The Vermilion River	71,259	898 sq mi (2,326 km^{2})	State map highlighting Vermilion County
Wabash County	185	Mount Carmel	December 27, 1824	Edwards County	The Wabash River	10,907	223 sq mi (578 km^{2})	State map highlighting Wabash County
Warren County	187	Monmouth	January 13, 1825	Schuyler County	Joseph Warren (1741–1775), played a role in American Patriot movements, a prominent early fatality in the American Revolutionary War	16,222	542 sq mi (1,404 km^{2})	State map highlighting Warren County
Washington County	189	Nashville	January 2, 1818	St. Clair County	George Washington (1732–1799), commander-in-chief of American forces in the American Revolutionary War and first President of the United States	13,564	562 sq mi (1,456 km^{2})	State map highlighting Washington County
Wayne County	191	Fairfield	March 26, 1819	Edwards County	Gen. "Mad" Anthony Wayne (1745–1796), major general in the United States Army in the American Revolutionary War and the Northwest Indian War	15,882	713 sq mi (1,847 km^{2})	State map highlighting Wayne County
White County	193	Carmi	February 1, 1816	Gallatin County	Isaac White (1776–1811), resident of Illinois who enlisted in the Indiana militia and was killed at the Battle of Tippecanoe	13,250	494 sq mi (1,279 km^{2})	State map highlighting White County
Whiteside County	195	Morrison	January 16, 1836	Jo Daviess and Henry County	Samuel Whiteside (1783–1868), state legislator and militia leader	54,121	684 sq mi (1,772 km^{2})	State map highlighting Whiteside County
Will County	197	Joliet	January 12, 1836	Cook and Iroquois County	Conrad Will (1779–1835), physician, local businessman and longtime member of the state legislature	712,253	835 sq mi (2,163 km^{2})	State map highlighting Will County
Williamson County	199	Marion	August 5, 1839	Franklin County	Williamson County, Tennessee, which was named for Hugh Williamson	67,225	420 sq mi (1,088 km^{2})	State map highlighting Williamson County
Winnebago County	201	Rockford	January 16, 1836	Jo Daviess County	Winnebago Native Americans	283,674	513 sq mi (1,329 km^{2})	State map highlighting Winnebago County
Woodford County	203	Eureka	February 27, 1841	Tazewell and McLean County	Woodford County, Kentucky, which was named for William Woodford	38,111	527 sq mi (1,365 km^{2})	State map highlighting Woodford County

== Racial / Ethnic Profile of counties in Illinois (2020 Census) ==
Racial / Ethnic Profile of counties in Illinois (2020 Census)
Following is a table of counties in Illinois by race/ethnicity. The majority racial/ethnic group is coded per the key below.

Majority minority with no dominant group
Majority White
Majority Black
Majority Hispanic
Majority Asian

Racial and ethnic composition of counties in Illinois (2020 Census) (NH = Non-Hispanic) Note: the US Census treats Hispanic/Latino as an ethnic category. This table excludes Latinos from the racial categories and assigns them to a separate category. Hispanics/Latinos may be of any race.
County	Location of County	Total Population	White alone (NH)	%	Black or African American alone (NH)	%	Native American or Alaska Native alone (NH)	%	Asian alone (NH)	%	Pacific Islander alone (NH)	%	Other race alone (NH)	%	Mixed race or Multiracial (NH)	%	Hispanic or Latino (any race)	%
Adams		65,737	58,389	88.82%	2,464	3.75%	92	0.14%	500	0.76%	33	0.05%	223	0.34%	2,749	4.18%	1,287	1.96%
Alexander		5,240	3,274	62.48%	1,612	30.76%	22	0.42%	6	0.11%	0	0.00%	8	0.15%	236	4.50%	82	1.56%
Bond		16,725	14,264	85.29%	1,073	6.42%	52	0.31%	94	0.56%	11	0.07%	93	0.56%	534	3.19%	604	3.61%
Boone		53,448	36,689	68.64%	1,171	2.19%	72	0.13%	637	1.19%	9	0.02%	181	0.34%	1,809	3.38%	12,880	24.10%
Brown		6,244	4,764	76.30%	1,035	16.58%	7	0.11%	11	0.18%	0	0.00%	2	0.03%	143	2.29%	282	4.52%
Bureau		33,244	28,511	85.76%	259	0.78%	49	0.15%	298	0.90%	21	0.06%	51	0.15%	960	2.89%	3,095	9.31%
Calhoun		4,437	4,217	95.04%	7	0.16%	4	0.09%	7	0.16%	0	0.00%	6	0.14%	132	2.97%	64	1.44%
Carroll		15,702	13,743	87.52%	676	4.31%	49	0.31%	40	0.25%	5	0.03%	32	0.20%	400	2.55%	757	4.82%
Cass		13,042	9,061	69.48%	706	5.41%	36	0.28%	117	0.90%	33	0.25%	10	0.08%	290	2.22%	2,789	21.38%
Champaign		205,865	125,280	60.86%	28,215	13.71%	279	0.14%	24,420	11.86%	60	0.03%	897	0.44%	10,048	4.88%	16,666	8.10%
Christian		34,032	31,226	91.75%	380	1.12%	59	0.17%	179	0.53%	1	0.00%	60	0.18%	1,033	3.04%	1,094	3.21%
Clark		15,455	14,680	94.99%	54	0.35%	28	0.18%	52	0.34%	0	0.00%	30	0.19%	365	2.36%	246	1.59%
Clay		13,288	12,481	93.93%	30	0.23%	33	0.25%	77	0.58%	0	0.00%	18	0.14%	426	3.21%	223	1.68%
Clinton		36,899	32,845	89.01%	1,140	3.09%	80	0.22%	175	0.47%	5	0.01%	93	0.25%	1,174	3.18%	1,387	3.76%
Coles		46,863	40,352	86.11%	2,043	4.36%	82	0.17%	617	1.32%	24	0.05%	211	0.45%	1,766	3.77%	1,768	3.77%
Cook		5,275,541	2,135,243	40.47%	1,185,601	22.47%	5,655	0.11%	408,691	7.75%	961	0.02%	20,538	0.39%	136,074	2.58%	1,382,778	26.21%
Crawford		18,679	16,941	90.70%	608	3.25%	36	0.19%	76	0.41%	2	0.01%	29	0.16%	540	2.89%	447	2.39%
Cumberland		10,450	9,947	95.19%	28	0.27%	13	0.12%	21	0.20%	0	0.00%	17	0.16%	312	2.99%	112	1.07%
DeKalb		100,420	71,249	70.95%	8,730	8.69%	119	0.12%	2,280	2.27%	29	0.03%	298	0.30%	4,118	4.10%	13,597	13.54%
DeWitt		15,516	14,370	92.61%	108	0.70%	19	0.12%	40	0.26%	16	0.10%	16	0.10%	437	2.82%	510	3.29%
Douglas		19,740	17,420	88.25%	67	0.34%	28	0.14%	103	0.52%	6	0.03%	34	0.17%	517	2.62%	1,565	7.93%
DuPage		932,877	591,441	63.40%	44,201	4.74%	873	0.09%	118,982	12.75%	219	0.02%	3,299	0.35%	29,571	3.17%	144,291	15.47%
Edgar		16,866	16,005	94.90%	82	0.49%	17	0.10%	51	0.30%	0	0.00%	33	0.20%	453	2.69%	225	1.33%
Edwards		6,245	5,994	95.98%	16	0.26%	8	0.13%	21	0.34%	4	0.06%	11	0.18%	128	2.05%	63	1.01%
Effingham		34,668	32,361	93.35%	151	0.44%	36	0.10%	246	0.71%	6	0.02%	45	0.13%	951	2.74%	872	2.52%
Fayette		21,488	19,425	90.40%	780	3.63%	80	0.37%	67	0.31%	1	0.00%	31	0.14%	447	2.08%	657	3.06%
Ford		13,534	12,265	90.62%	75	0.55%	24	0.18%	57	0.42%	0	0.00%	42	0.31%	517	3.82%	554	4.09%
Franklin		37,804	35,210	93.14%	162	0.43%	92	0.24%	119	0.31%	4	0.01%	63	0.17%	1,512	4.00%	642	1.70%
Fulton		33,609	30,616	91.09%	1,102	3.28%	59	0.18%	69	0.21%	6	0.02%	77	0.23%	942	2.80%	738	2.20%
Gallatin		4,946	4,683	94.68%	25	0.51%	5	0.10%	23	0.47%	0	0.00%	3	0.06%	154	3.11%	53	1.07%
Greene		11,985	11,451	95.54%	18	0.15%	13	0.11%	21	0.18%	3	0.03%	23	0.19%	350	2.92%	106	0.88%
Grundy		52,533	43,472	82.75%	833	1.59%	48	0.09%	466	0.89%	16	0.03%	122	0.23%	1,864	3.55%	5,712	10.87%
Hamilton		7,993	7,574	94.76%	36	0.45%	16	0.20%	12	0.15%	0	0.00%	1	0.01%	258	3.23%	96	1.20%
Hancock		17,620	16,599	94.21%	73	0.41%	38	0.22%	57	0.32%	4	0.02%	29	0.16%	502	2.85%	318	1.80%
Hardin		3,649	3,374	92.46%	11	0.30%	0	0.00%	17	0.47%	2	0.05%	4	0.11%	176	4.82%	65	1.78%
Henderson		6,387	6,060	94.88%	29	0.45%	5	0.08%	14	0.22%	5	0.08%	0	0.00%	162	2.54%	112	1.75%
Henry		49,284	43,094	87.44%	1,029	2.09%	63	0.13%	192	0.39%	12	0.02%	94	0.19%	1,630	3.31%	3,170	6.43%
Iroquois		27,077	23,602	87.17%	212	0.78%	38	0.14%	99	0.37%	0	0.00%	48	0.18%	993	3.67%	2,085	7.70%
Jackson		52,974	37,513	70.81%	7,503	14.16%	114	0.22%	2,048	3.87%	24	0.05%	239	0.45%	2,696	5.09%	2,837	5.36%
Jasper		9,287	8,934	96.20%	22	0.24%	19	0.20%	15	0.16%	4	0.04%	19	0.20%	190	2.05%	84	0.90%
Jefferson		37,113	31,182	84.02%	2,783	7.50%	77	0.21%	352	0.95%	7	0.02%	68	0.18%	1,745	4.70%	899	2.42%
Jersey		21,512	20,105	93.46%	156	0.73%	21	0.10%	74	0.34%	3	0.01%	32	0.15%	794	3.69%	327	1.52%
Jo Daviess		22,035	20,354	92.37%	114	0.52%	31	0.14%	96	0.44%	6	0.03%	52	0.24%	526	2.39%	856	3.88%
Johnson		13,308	10,895	81.87%	1,419	10.66%	20	0.15%	18	0.14%	4	0.03%	12	0.09%	388	2.92%	552	4.15%
Kane		516,522	282,307	54.66%	26,239	5.08%	514	0.10%	21,191	4.10%	115	0.02%	1,521	0.29%	15,040	2.91%	169,595	32.83%
Kankakee		107,502	73,591	68.46%	15,417	14.34%	173	0.16%	1,069	0.99%	13	0.01%	372	0.35%	4,347	4.04%	12,520	11.65%
Kendall		131,869	84,690	64.22%	9,693	7.35%	117	0.09%	4,625	3.51%	10	0.01%	487	0.37%	5,120	3.88%	27,127	20.57%
Knox		49,967	39,615	79.28%	4,354	8.71%	73	0.15%	361	0.72%	12	0.02%	207	0.41%	2,294	4.59%	3,051	6.11%
Lake		714,342	408,349	57.16%	47,240	6.61%	909	0.13%	58,901	8.25%	312	0.04%	3,264	0.46%	23,405	3.28%	171,962	24.07%
LaSalle		109,658	90,445	82.48%	2,514	2.29%	153	0.14%	855	0.78%	8	0.01%	297	0.27%	3,930	3.58%	11,456	10.45%
Lawrence		15,280	12,777	83.62%	1,393	9.12%	12	0.08%	58	0.38%	7	0.05%	29	0.19%	490	3.21%	514	3.36%
Lee		34,145	28,435	83.28%	1,831	5.36%	30	0.09%	248	0.73%	10	0.03%	95	0.28%	1,172	3.43%	2,324	6.81%
Livingston		35,815	31,518	88.00%	1,081	3.02%	38	0.11%	171	0.48%	1	0.00%	89	0.25%	1,058	2.95%	1,859	5.19%
Logan		27,987	24,452	87.37%	1,494	5.34%	48	0.17%	178	0.64%	1	0.00%	76	0.27%	920	3.29%	818	2.92%
McDonough		27,238	23,062	84.67%	1,498	5.50%	47	0.17%	560	2.06%	6	0.02%	73	0.27%	1,030	3.78%	962	3.53%
McHenry		310,229	238,659	76.93%	4,073	1.31%	325	0.10%	8,669	2.79%	45	0.01%	872	0.28%	10,881	3.51%	46,705	15.06%
McLean		170,954	129,440	75.72%	14,699	8.60%	258	0.15%	8,108	4.74%	38	0.02%	618	0.36%	7,269	4.25%	10,524	6.16%
Macon		103,998	75,117	72.23%	18,886	18.16%	178	0.17%	1,512	1.45%	31	0.03%	415	0.40%	5,126	4.93%	2,733	2.63%
Macoupin		44,967	41,850	93.07%	368	0.82%	109	0.24%	179	0.40%	0	0.00%	54	0.12%	1,837	4.09%	570	1.27%
Madison		265,859	213,793	80.42%	24,671	9.28%	559	0.21%	2,718	1.02%	92	0.03%	825	0.31%	12,404	4.67%	10,797	4.06%
Marion		37,729	33,150	87.86%	1,509	4.00%	94	0.25%	349	0.93%	1	0.00%	97	0.26%	1,817	4.82%	712	1.89%
Marshall		11,742	10,858	92.47%	86	0.73%	18	0.15%	43	0.37%	0	0.00%	25	0.21%	389	3.31%	323	2.75%
Mason		13,086	12,339	94.29%	49	0.37%	24	0.18%	26	0.20%	1	0.01%	11	0.08%	452	3.45%	184	1.41%
Massac		14,169	12,077	85.24%	875	6.18%	35	0.25%	43	0.30%	6	0.04%	61	0.43%	739	5.22%	333	2.35%
Menard		12,297	11,502	93.54%	80	0.65%	18	0.15%	49	0.40%	2	0.02%	25	0.20%	461	3.75%	160	1.30%
Mercer		15,699	14,578	92.86%	68	0.43%	26	0.17%	37	0.24%	2	0.01%	17	0.11%	503	3.20%	468	2.98%
Monroe		34,962	32,680	93.47%	118	0.34%	53	0.15%	186	0.53%	2	0.01%	66	0.19%	1,211	3.46%	646	1.85%
Montgomery		28,288	25,709	90.88%	916	3.24%	49	0.17%	131	0.46%	7	0.02%	26	0.09%	863	3.05%	587	2.08%
Morgan		32,915	28,489	86.55%	1,961	5.96%	54	0.16%	266	0.81%	16	0.05%	84	0.26%	1,207	3.67%	838	2.55%
Moultrie		14,526	13,747	94.64%	84	0.58%	26	0.18%	49	0.34%	0	0.00%	25	0.17%	401	2.76%	194	1.34%
Ogle		51,788	43,120	83.26%	543	1.05%	72	0.14%	259	0.50%	0	0.00%	104	0.20%	1,893	3.66%	5,797	11.19%
Peoria		181,830	120,629	66.34%	33,635	18.50%	342	0.19%	7,730	4.25%	61	0.03%	783	0.43%	8,559	4.71%	10,091	5.55%
Perry		20,945	17,779	84.88%	1,653	7.89%	34	0.16%	125	0.60%	1	0.00%	34	0.16%	605	2.89%	714	3.41%
Piatt		16,673	15,600	93.56%	83	0.50%	23	0.14%	80	0.48%	1	0.01%	51	0.31%	588	3.53%	247	1.48%
Pike		14,739	13,874	94.13%	63	0.43%	33	0.22%	43	0.29%	6	0.04%	20	0.14%	438	2.97%	262	1.78%
Pope		3,763	3,491	92.77%	38	1.01%	1	0.03%	16	0.43%	0	0.00%	0	0.00%	146	3.88%	71	1.89%
Pulaski		5,193	3,245	62.49%	1,462	28.15%	36	0.69%	13	0.25%	0	0.00%	14	0.27%	219	4.22%	204	3.93%
Putnam		5,637	5,073	89.99%	26	0.46%	7	0.12%	18	0.32%	4	0.07%	8	0.14%	153	2.71%	348	6.17%
Randolph		30,163	25,460	84.41%	2,381	7.89%	48	0.16%	86	0.29%	7	0.02%	72	0.24%	1,078	3.57%	1,031	3.42%
Richland		15,813	14,813	93.68%	75	0.47%	28	0.18%	123	0.78%	7	0.04%	22	0.14%	472	2.98%	273	1.73%
Rock Island		144,672	97,689	67.52%	16,169	11.18%	240	0.17%	4,033	2.79%	35	0.02%	482	0.33%	6,182	4.27%	19,842	13.72%
St. Clair		257,400	150,496	58.47%	76,013	29.53%	490	0.19%	3,623	1.41%	181	0.07%	1,152	0.45%	12,863	5.00%	12,582	4.89%
Saline		23,768	21,309	89.65%	692	2.91%	69	0.29%	122	0.51%	0	0.00%	94	0.40%	1,009	4.25%	473	1.99%
Sangamon		196,343	150,467	76.63%	25,686	13.08%	349	0.18%	4,300	2.19%	55	0.03%	727	0.37%	9,450	4.81%	5,309	2.70%
Schuyler		6,902	6,157	89.21%	283	4.10%	28	0.41%	25	0.36%	2	0.03%	17	0.25%	238	3.45%	152	2.20%
Scott		4,949	4,747	95.92%	5	0.10%	1	0.02%	11	0.22%	1	0.02%	5	0.10%	131	2.65%	48	0.97%
Shelby		20,990	20,116	95.84%	65	0.31%	35	0.17%	83	0.40%	1	0.00%	40	0.19%	437	2.08%	213	1.01%
Stark		5,400	5,070	93.89%	17	0.31%	8	0.15%	23	0.43%	0	0.00%	5	0.09%	145	2.69%	132	2.44%
Stephenson		44,630	35,405	79.33%	4,374	9.80%	80	0.18%	306	0.69%	11	0.02%	155	0.35%	2,045	4.58%	2,254	5.05%
Tazewell		131,343	119,882	91.27%	1,629	1.24%	279	0.21%	1,080	0.82%	41	0.03%	324	0.25%	4,947	3.77%	3,161	2.41%
Union		17,244	15,331	88.91%	226	1.31%	46	0.27%	67	0.39%	11	0.06%	28	0.16%	668	3.87%	867	5.03%
Vermilion		74,188	56,186	75.73%	10,247	13.81%	140	0.19%	568	0.77%	10	0.01%	249	0.34%	2,972	4.01%	3,816	5.14%
Wabash		11,361	10,520	92.60%	53	0.47%	15	0.13%	251	2.21%	6	0.05%	15	0.13%	323	2.84%	178	1.57%
Warren		16,835	13,494	80.15%	577	3.43%	31	0.18%	329	1.95%	15	0.09%	46	0.27%	554	3.29%	1,789	10.63%
Washington		13,761	12,976	94.30%	85	0.62%	25	0.18%	65	0.47%	20	0.15%	15	0.11%	351	2.55%	224	1.63%
Wayne		16,179	15,400	95.19%	90	0.56%	26	0.16%	49	0.30%	5	0.03%	29	0.18%	398	2.46%	182	1.12%
White		13,877	13,007	93.73%	91	0.66%	22	0.16%	65	0.47%	18	0.13%	15	0.11%	471	3.39%	188	1.35%
Whiteside		55,691	45,341	81.42%	741	1.33%	60	0.11%	306	0.55%	9	0.02%	149	0.27%	1,954	3.51%	7,131	12.80%
Will		696,355	418,418	60.09%	79,256	11.38%	711	0.10%	42,416	6.09%	82	0.01%	2,105	0.30%	22,516	3.23%	130,851	18.79%
Williamson		67,153	58,193	86.66%	2,809	4.18%	230	0.34%	771	1.15%	9	0.01%	207	0.31%	3,155	4.70%	1,779	2.65%
Winnebago		285,350	183,235	64.21%	38,240	13.40%	559	0.20%	7,938	2.78%	66	0.02%	1,099	0.39%	13,261	4.65%	40,952	14.35%
Woodford		38,467	35,844	93.18%	269	0.70%	42	0.11%	217	0.56%	10	0.03%	89	0.23%	1,256	3.27%	740	1.92%

== Defunct counties ==
- Dane County was renamed in 1840 to the current Christian County.
- The original Knox County, Illinois, became extinct with the formation of the Illinois Territory in 1809 - or, more precisely, it became Knox County, Indiana. The modern Knox County, Illinois was formed much later and was not a part of the original Knox County.

== See also ==
- List of census-designated places in Illinois
- List of cities in Illinois
- List of Illinois townships
- List of precincts in Illinois
- List of towns and villages in Illinois
- List of unincorporated communities in Illinois
- National Association of Counties
- National Register of Historic Places listings in Illinois
