= House at 1177 Main Street =

Historic house in Massachusetts, United States

- U.S. National Register of Historic Places
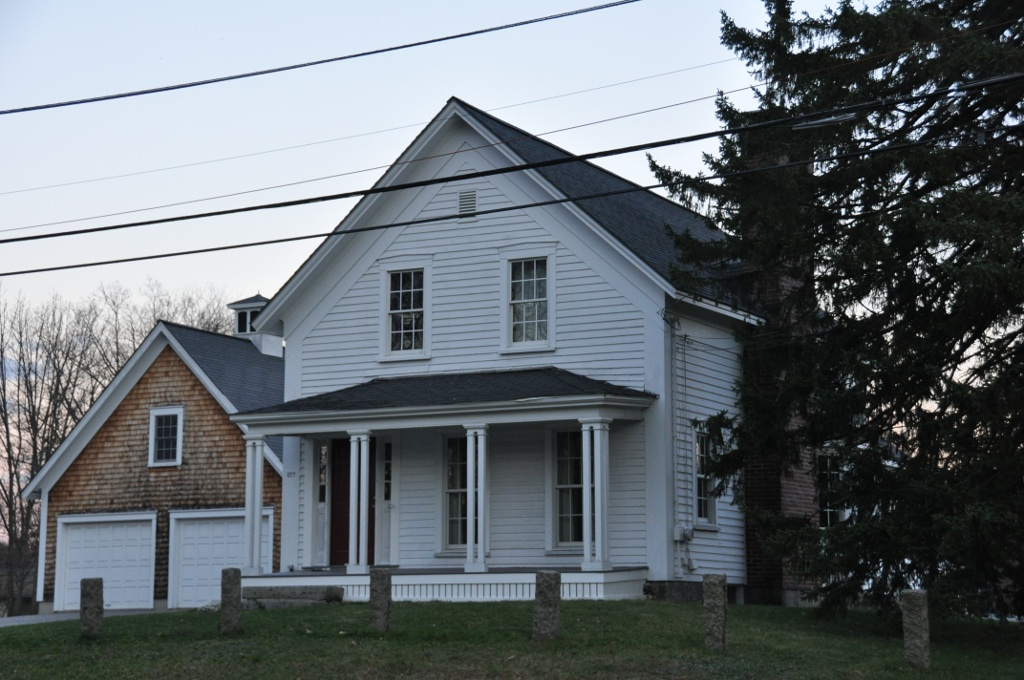

- Location within Massachusetts Location within the United States
- Location: 1177 Main St., Reading, Massachusetts
- Coordinates: 42°32′47″N 71°6′16″W
- Built: 1853
- Architectural style: Greek Revival, Italianate
- MPS: Reading MRA
- NRHP reference No.: 84002668
- Added to NRHP: July 19, 1984

1177 Main Street in Reading, Massachusetts, is a well-preserved and prominent local example of transitional Greek Revival-Italianate house. It was built sometime before 1854 by John Nichols, and probably served as a farmhouse. It was listed on the National Register of Historic Places in 1984.

== Description and history ==
It is located in northern Reading, on the east side of Main Street (Massachusetts Route 28, a major artery), between its junctions with Brentwood and Fairchild Drives. The lot on which it is set backs onto Pearl Street, which follows a more undulating north–south route than Main Street. In front of the house are a series of granite posts, which originally supported a rail fence. The house is 2 1/2 stories in height, of wood-frame construction, and has a gabled roof and clapboarded exterior. The gable ends of the roof have no returns, and it has a broad cornice. The first-floor front windows are full-length, and are topped by shallow pediments. The full-width front porch is supported by paired columns. An ell extends to the left, joining the house to a garage.

The house was built by John Nichols, a member of the locally prominent Nichols family, whose ancestral homestead originally stood nearby. It was built sometime before 1854, the year it first appears on local maps. Given the rural character of the area at the time of its construction, Nichols was probably a farmer.

== See also ==
- National Register of Historic Places listings in Reading, Massachusetts
- National Register of Historic Places listings in Middlesex County, Massachusetts
