= Benjamin Stephenson House =

Historic house in Illinois, United States

- U.S. National Register of Historic Places
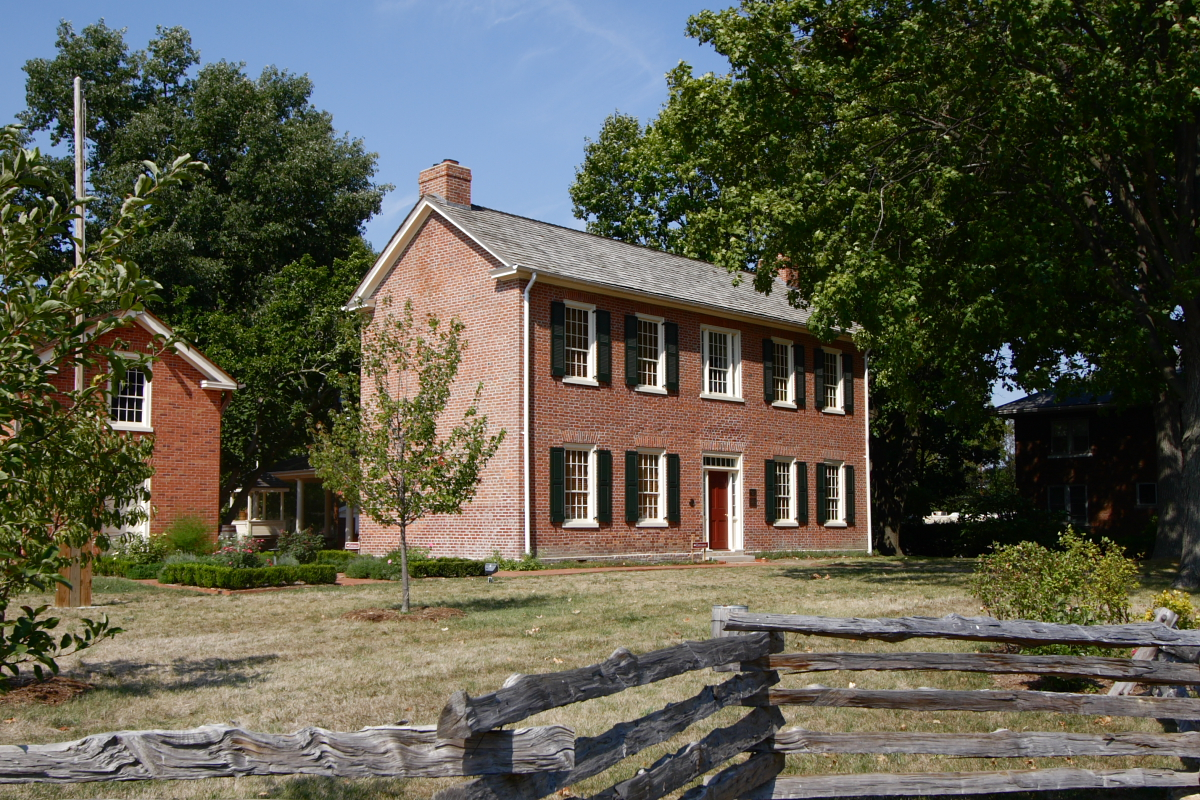
- The fully restored Benjamin Stephenson House in 2007.

- Location within Illinois Location within the United States
- Location: 409 S. Buchanan St., Edwardsville, Illinois
- Coordinates: 38°48′26″N 89°57′8″W
- Area: less than one acre
- Built: 1820; 1845
- Architect: Benjamin Stephenson (builder)
- Architectural style: Federal
- NRHP reference No.: 80001395
- Added to NRHP: May 31, 1980

The Benjamin Stephenson House is a Federal style home built in 1820 in the city of Edwardsville, Illinois, United States. The house was constructed for prominent Edwardsville citizen and Illinois politician Benjamin Stephenson. He died shortly after the home's completion and the home had 15 subsequent owners, some of whom made major alterations to the original structure. In 1845 the addition of an ell altered the appearance of the house. The last two owners were the Sigma Phi Epsilon fraternity and the current owner, the city of Edwardsville.

In 1999 the city of Edwardsville purchased the home from the Sigma Phi Epsilon fraternity and in 2001 a restoration project began. The project aimed to restore the house to its authentic 1820s appearance and open the house as a public museum. The house has been the subject of tales of ghostly activity since at least the 1970s, though no recent reports exist. The Stephenson House has prominence for its architecture and for its affiliation with Illinois politics. The building was added to the U.S. National Register of Historic Places in 1980.

== Location ==
The Benjamin Stephenson House was originally located on a 182-acre (0.7 km^{2}) tract of land purchased by John Robinson about two miles (3 km) from the center of Edwardsville, Illinois; at the time along the bluffs above Cahokia Creek. The house, today, is located along South Buchanan Street in Edwardsville, along one of the busiest stretches of Illinois Route 159. The house is still on its original site, though the property is only one acre.

== History ==
Colonel Benjamin Stephenson purchased the 182-acre (0.7 km^{2}) tract of land that would become the site of the Stephenson House in 1819 from John Robinson. In 1820, construction began on the house, which, when complete, served as his home, office, and political headquarters for the remainder of his life. At that time, Stephenson enslaved eleven people with an additional two free Black people living on site. Benjamin Stephenson died in the home on October 10, 1822.

On January 29, 1825, while at the Stephenson House for a party, Daniel D. Smith was stabbed to death. Apparently an argument occurred, and Smith was later found in the dining room with a stab wound; as the group was picking him up, he uttered "Winchester" and died. News reports in The Spectator (Edwardsville) indicated that Smith was "killed in an affray" at the Stephenson House. Benjamin's son, James W. Stephenson, James D. Henry and Palemon Winchester were indicted for the murder. Palemon was Benjamin Stephenson's son-in-law, having married his daughter Julia in 1820. Though all three men were charged with the crime, Stephenson and Henry were released on bond.

Winchester was the only defendant who faced trial in the murder. Winchester's lawyer argued that Smith was guilty of verbal assault against the defendant, and Winchester was found not guilty. The verdict was reported in The Spectator on March 22, 1825. In 1828 Stephenson left Edwardsville, moving to Galena in Jo Daviess County where he made his home most of the rest of his life. He was buried at Lusk Memorial Cemetery in Edwardsville. Winchester later went to Carlinville, Illinois.

In the years following Benjamin Stephenson's death, the house changed owners 15 times. In 1833, Benjamin's son, James Stephenson owned the title to the Stephenson House, but by the next year it was owned by the wife of Stephenson family friend Ninian Edwards, Elvira, who held the deed until 1837. The house was sold to Thomas and Elizabeth Birks in 1837, then to Philip Fix in 1839. In 1845, Philip Fix deeded the house to his daughter Caroline, who immediately deeded it to her husband, Frederick Wolf. Wolf made significant alterations to the house around 1845, tearing down and completely rebuilding the kitchen wing. That family occupied the home until at least 1894. Others who owned the house also made alterations including J. Frank Dickman in 1902; other changes were made during the 1940s. Rev. Stephen Weissman, who successfully nominated the house for the U.S. National Register of Historic Places, purchased the home in 1975. After the nomination's acceptance the house was designated an Edwardsville Landmark.

In 1982 the Sigma Phi Epsilon fraternity at Southern Illinois University, Edwardsville (SIUE) bought the house and occupied it until the late 1990s. In 1998 the Edwardsville Historic Preservation Committee received US$800,000 from the state of Illinois, $500,000 of which they used to buy the Stephenson House from the fraternity. The city purchased the home in 1999 and the fraternity ended its tenure in what was the first fraternity house at SIUE.

== Restoration ==
On May 14, 2001, the city of Edwardsville held a ground breaking ceremony to officially commence a restoration project aimed at returning the house to the most original condition possible. The eventual goal of the project was to furnish the home circa 1820s and open it as a house museum to the public. The restoration project, overseen by the firm St. Louis Tuckpointing and Painting, carried a price tag of more than $1 million; $150,000 to purchase the house, $725,000 in restoration costs and $215,000 to purchase a nearby gas station. Initially the project was to be completed by December 2003, but by April 2004 most of the exterior work had been finished with interior plastering and wood floor installation remaining. The restoration was nearly totally completed by the time the official dedication ceremony occurred on July 1–2, 2006, more than six years after the purchase of the house by the city.

== Architecture ==
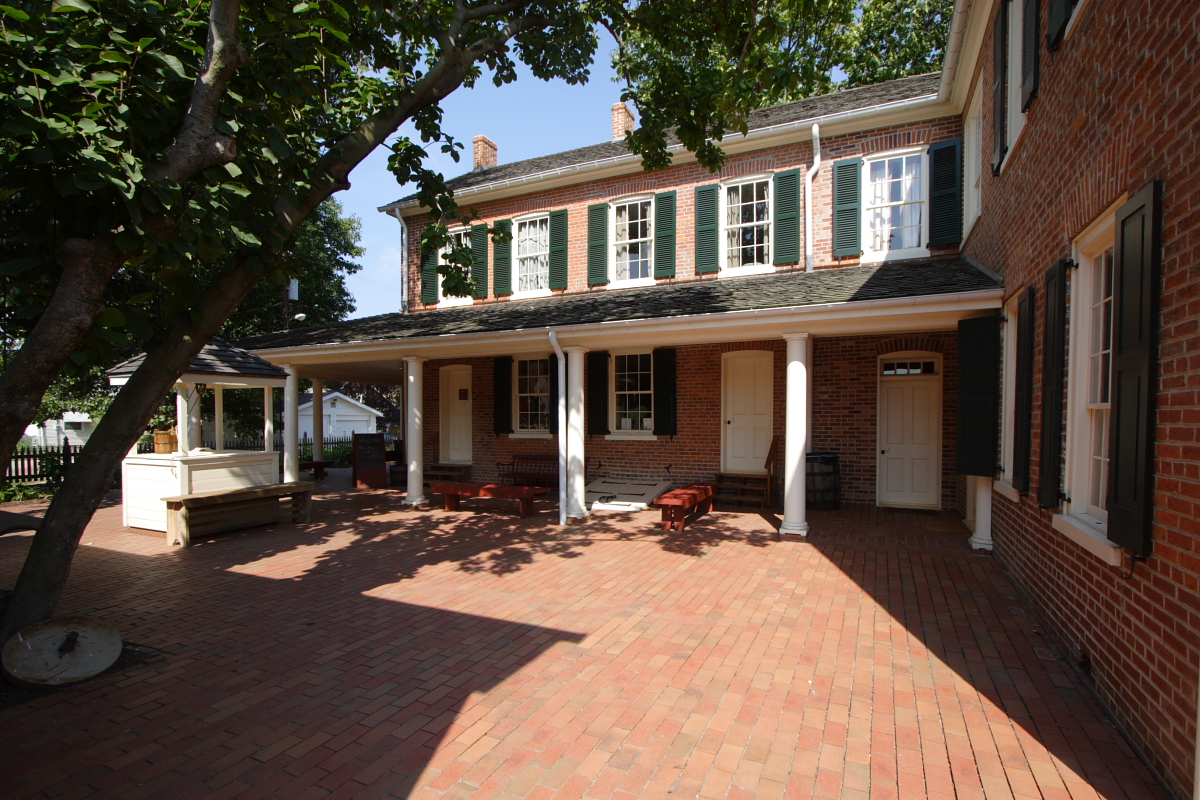
The upper part of this wing was added to the original house in 1845.

The house was built in the early Federal style and was originally designed as a two-story rectangular building with four square rooms and a kitchen. The interior and exterior walls are of three course thick brick; the bricks were manufactured on site by Benjamin Stephenson's enslaved persons. Although legally referred to as indentured servants, their enslaver could choose the length of servitude, in many cases listing the period of indenture as high as 99 years. This ensured that "indentured servants" could never be freed from legal bondage. The exterior is composed of at least 400,000 bricks, all of which were made on the Stephenson House property. Each of the four front rooms, two on the first floor and two on the second floor are 18 foot (5.5 m) by 18 foot (5.5 m) square and contain fireplaces. Five windows grace the second floor, while on the first floor there are four windows and an inset door which opens into the central hallway.

On its interior, the Stephenson House, again, has brick walls. The central hallway is 7 feet (2.1 m) wide and stretches in a "Southern manner," from the front to the back of the house. The central hallway contains the home's staircase. The four rooms' fireplaces are vented through two chimneys, constructed flush with the north and south end walls. The interior floor were originally of four inch (102 mm) wide pine board and covered with oak during the 1940s. The staircase is made of red cypress and features relatively ornately carved woodwork, all of which is original and cast in Adam style.

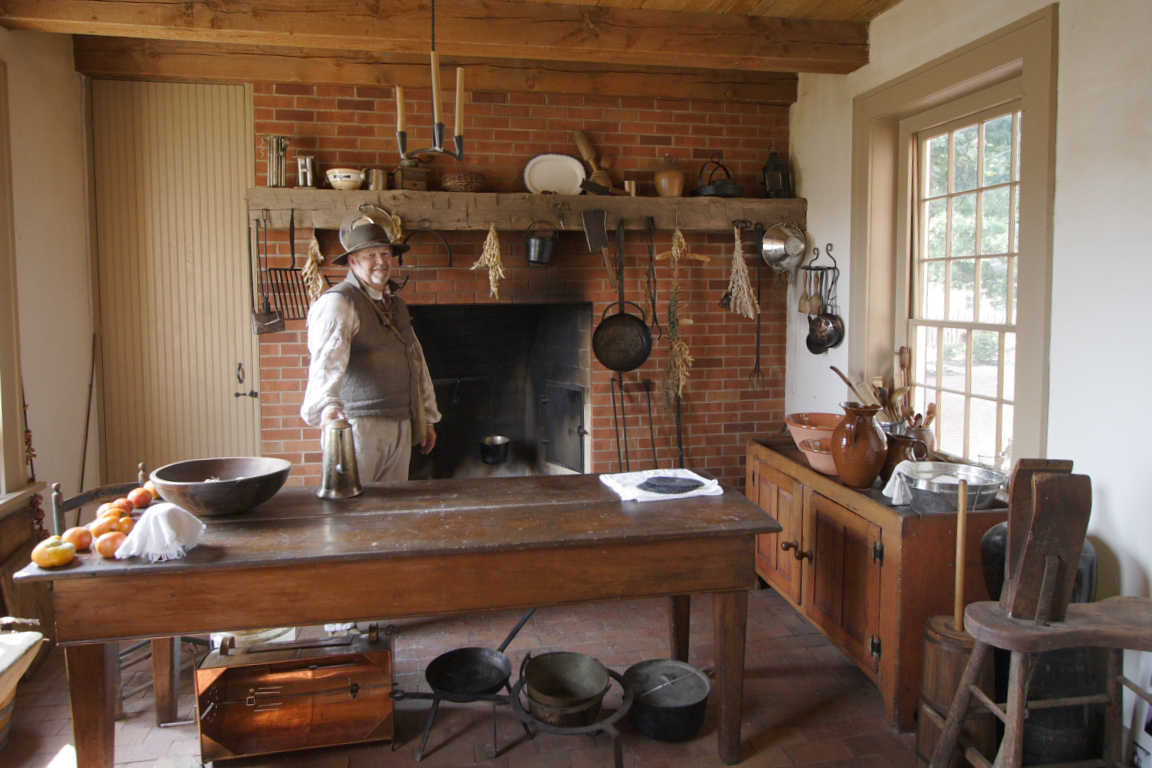
The restored kitchen at the Stephenson House. Unlike the original kitchen, this one is detached from the main building.

Behind (west of) the house's dining room was a 20 foot (6.1 m) by 20 foot (6.1 m) kitchen constructed over a fruit cellar, with a half-story on top of it. This wing was torn down when the home underwent extensive remodeling in 1845. A new kitchen was built with full story added on top. A 13-foot (4.0 m) wide veranda was attached to the wing's south side.

The subsequent owner made further alterations to the house in 1902. The owner added a 20-foot (6.1 m) by 12 foot (3.7 m) Victorian front porch, complete with a gable roof and Victorian style wood tracery. He also reversed the home's staircase and filled in all four original fireplaces. During the 1940s the home underwent further remodeling, in part, to modernize the building. Inside, modern plumbing was added and outside a frame one car garage was attached to the west end of the house. The 1902 porch was torn off the east facade, thus restoring it to its original appearance. In addition, the pillars on the south side of the house were replaced with square designs and a French door was cut into the north facade to open onto a brick terrace.

== Purported hauntings ==
Stories of alleged ghostly phenomena at the Stephenson House date back to at least the 1970s. Speculation about the identity of the purported spirit has centered around Benjamin Stephenson, who died in the house. One former resident, who lived in the house during the 1970s told a local newspaper about phantom footsteps, odd noises, and the appearance of someone on the terrace when no one was there. Members of the Sigma Phi Epsilon fraternity recalled similar and different incidents. Former fraternity members reported, not only the phantom footsteps, but servants peering out from behind mirrors and "people" in military uniforms. A Stephenson House volunteer and Edwardsville historian reported that in her years of work at the house she has yet to experience any ghostly phenomena.

== Significance ==
The Benjamin Stephenson House is the oldest brick house in Edwardsville and considered significant for its architectural beauty, and association with important historic Illinois figures. Architecturally, the house is representative of an era. Most of the house's importance comes from its association with the family of Benjamin Stephenson. The Stephenson family played a prominent role in Illinois politics. Benjamin Stephenson served as a colonel during the War of 1812 and later held several political offices including U.S. representative from the Illinois Territory and delegate to the first Illinois constitutional convention. In 1836 the Illinois legislature named Stephenson County, in northern Illinois, after him. One of his sons, James W. Stephenson, also played a prominent role in Illinois politics as the Democratic gubernatorial candidate in 1838.

Commonly, and mistakenly, the house is often referred to as the "Edwards House". This is due to the close association of the Stephenson family with that of the first Illinois territorial Governor Ninian Edwards. The historical record shows that Benjamin Stephenson and Edwards were close personal friends and political allies. The pair led the Edwardsville Jacksonian Democratic Party and when Edwards' house burned he and his family took up residence in the Stephenson House for a time. The Benjamin Stephenson House is the remaining piece of architecture which intertwines the two men's personal stories.

For its architectural style and political affiliations the Benjamin Stephenson House was listed on the U.S. National Register of Historic Places on May 31, 1980. As early as 1972 Illinois State Senator Sam Vadalabene sponsored a bill meant to authorize the state to purchase the Stephenson House and open it to the public as an Illinois State Historic Site. Though the bill passed the Illinois House of Representatives, then-governor Richard Buell Ogilvie vetoed the legislation. The Illinois Historic Sites Inventory was ongoing during this period, 1971–1975, and it also noted the Stephenson House for its architectural and political significance.
