= Ralph Maxwell =

Ralph Maxwell may refer to:

- Ralph L. Maxwell (1905–1956), Illinois Supreme Court justice
- Ralph Maxwell (politician) (1934–2012), New Zealand politician
- Ralph Maxwell (athlete) (1919–2014), North Dakota state district court judge and masters athlete
