= Captain Goodwin–James Eustis House =

Historic house in Massachusetts, United States

- U.S. National Register of Historic Places
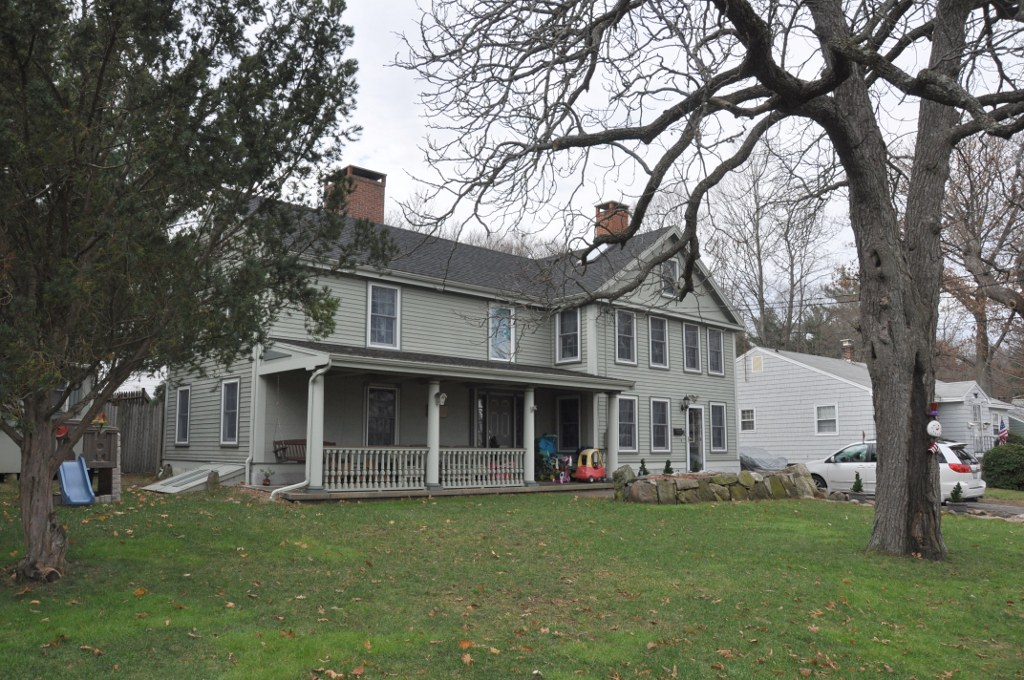

- Location within Massachusetts Location within the United States
- Location: 1 Elm St., Wakefield, Massachusetts
- Coordinates: 42°30′21″N 71°4′52″W
- Area: less than one acre
- Built: c. 1760, 1830
- Architectural style: Greek Revival
- MPS: Wakefield MRA
- NRHP reference No.: 89000744
- Added to NRHP: March 2, 1990

The Captain Goodwin–James Eustis House is a historic house in Wakefield, Massachusetts. Built about 1760 and enlarged around 1830, it is a good local example of Greek Revival architecture, which was owned by a prominent local businessman and civic leader. The house was listed on the National Register of Historic Places on March 2, 1990, where it is listed as the "Captain Goodwin–James Custis House".

== Description and history ==
The Captain Goodwin–James Eustis House is located west of downtown Wakefield, at the junction of Elm and Prospect Streets. It is a 2 1/2-story wood-frame structure, with a cross-gable roof, and mostly clapboarded exterior. It has a main block with a four-bay gabled facade, and a two-story section on the left side that is suspected to be of older construction. The main block's entrance is in the center-right bay, and its gable is fully pedimented with a flushboarded central tympanum. The side ell is fronted by a single-story shed roof porch, with round columns and a spindled balustrade.

The ell of the house was probably built c. 1760 by Captain James Goodwin, and was subsequently added onto by James Eustis and other families who have subsequently lived there. The town records were destroyed in the late eighteenth century and thus the oldest map to show the house is 1830. The present main block was likely the work of Eustis, who moved to the area in 1827, and operated a shop out of the left-side ell. Eustis was active in civic affairs, serving as a town selectman, insurance agent, and auctioneer. His descendants subdivided the farmland associated with the house for development.

== See also ==
- National Register of Historic Places listings in Wakefield, Massachusetts
- National Register of Historic Places listings in Middlesex County, Massachusetts
