= Washington County Courthouse (Illinois) =

Local government building in the United States

Coordinates: 38°20′39″N 89°22′59″W

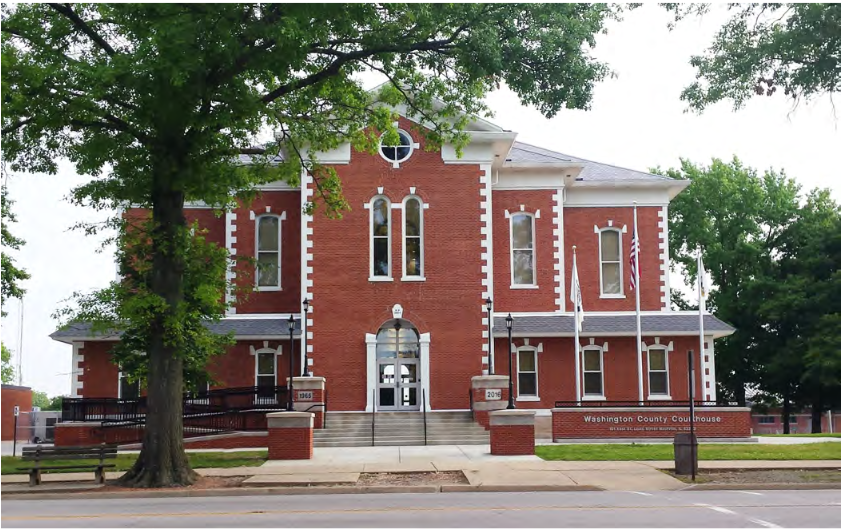
Southern front

The Washington County Courthouse is a government building in central Nashville, the county seat of Washington County, Illinois, United States. It is the fourth building to serve as the courthouse for Washington County, having been built in 1884 after the previous courthouse was destroyed by fire.

== History ==
Two men, John Lively and David Huggins, and their families were the first settlers in the parts of Randolph County just northeast of that county's current boundaries. They moved to this location circa 1811, but the depredations of the Indians in 1813 forced one family to leave, the other family was murdered, and the next permanent settlers did not arrive until 1815. The population increased rapidly beginning in 1817, prompting the territorial legislature to form Washington County in 1818. Its first county seat was Covington, in the center of the county, but the creation of Clinton County in 1824 left Covington on the county's northern fringe. As a result, a new town, Georgetown, was formed in 1827 to replace it, but no public buildings were built here, and a newly arrived judge found only deserted fields at the site in 1829. Farther south, two men began planning the town of Nashville in 1830, near the center of the county's new boundaries; it was formally platted in 1831, and the title of county seat moved from Covington in the same year.

== Architecture ==
Covington's courthouse was a primitive building of which no details have survived, and no courthouse was ever built at Georgetown. Therefore, when Nashville became the county seat, the county commissioners immediately contracted for the building of a courthouse on the public square, a frame building that was used until 1840. Its replacement, a square two-story structure with adjacent jail, allocated the first floor to the courts and the second to county offices, although this arrangement was reversed in 1855. However, fire destroyed this building in 1883; county officials immediately began laying plans for its replacement, and the fourth and current courthouse was erected in the following year, costing $24,000. It is an Italianate building, two stories tall, with an oculus and broken pediment above the arched main entrance, while stone quoins are set in the corners of the brick walls. Space concerns prompted the addition of one-story sections to each side of the facade in 1965; the county was careful to maintain the style of the original building.
