= Byron O. House =

American judge

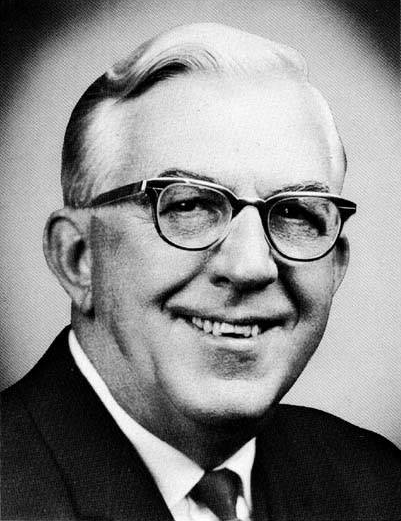

Chief Justice of the Illinois Supreme Court
- In office 1959–1960

Justice of the Illinois Supreme Court
- In office 1957–1969
- Preceded by: Ralph L. Maxwell

Personal details
- Born: September 27, 1902 St. Louis, Missouri, U.S.
- Died: September 27, 1969 (aged 67) Belleville, Illinois, U.S.
- Spouse: Mildred Irene Holston
- Children: James Byron; Marilyn Irene; Dorothy Holston
- Parents: Harold H. House; Olive Edwards
- Relatives: Florence May House Reuss (sister); Beulah Madaline House Maxwell (sister); Lawrence Emmerson House (brother); Ralph L. Maxwell (brother-in-law)

Byron Orvil House (September 27, 1902 – September 27, 1969) was an American jurist who served as Chief Justice of the Illinois Supreme Court.

== Early life and education ==
Byron Orvil House, oldest child of Harold Henry and Olive (Edwards) House, was born in St. Louis, Missouri on September 27, 1902. In 1903, his family moved to Washington County, Illinois, where his father taught school at Oakdale, Illinois and Ashley, Illinois before moving to Nashville, Illinois and establishing a law practice in 1908.

Byron attended the public schools in Nashville and, in 1921, entered pre-law at the University of Illinois. He married Mildred Irene Holston, daughter of Benjamin B. and Irene (Watts) Holston, on June 9, 1925. In 1926, Byron graduated from the University of Illinois College of Law, was admitted to the Illinois Bar, and began practicing law in Nashville with his father, establishing the firm of House & House.

== Career ==
Early in Byron's career, he worked on cases delegated to him by his father and also did some abstract work. In the 1930s, during the time of the bank moratorium, Byron found his services in demand and his successful handling of the problems of many banks in the area established his reputation as an able lawyer. Those were the days of public works projects and, as cities became interested in water and sewer projects, Byron's legal services were sought by surrounding towns. When the local oil boom began in the late 1930s and early 1940s, Byron did legal work for many major oil companies and independent operators. Still later, he worked to establish consolidated school districts, including the sale of unused rural schools and the construction of new schools. He became a recognized authority on school law.

In 1945, following the death of Byron's father, Wilbert Hohlt joined Byron in the law firm and the firm's name was changed to Hohlt & House. That same year, Byron's brother-in-law Ralph L. Maxwell, then State's Attorney and also a member of the family law firm, was elected circuit judge. Byron was approached to fill the State's Attorney vacancy, a position that he held until 1947. In 1955, Byron's son James became an associate of the firm. The following year, Byron was appointed circuit judge for the Third Judicial Circuit for Washington County, Illinois and he withdrew from the family law firm.

In 1957, Byron was elected to the State Supreme Court to succeed his late brother-in-law, Ralph L. Maxwell, who had been elected to the Court in 1951 but had died on August 29, 1956. Byron was re-elected in June, 1960, served as chief justice during the 1959–1960 term, and remained on the Court until his death. He also served as a member of the President's National Commission on Reform of Federal Criminal Laws.

== Personal life ==
Byron was a member of the First Presbyterian Church of Nashville, the Elks, and the I.O.O.F. He served on numerous local boards including the First National Bank of Nashville, Oakdale State Bank, Clarkson Manufacturing, Huegely Elevator and Nashville Gas Company.

Byron and Mildred had three children, James Byron (1927–2002), Marilyn Irene (1928–) and Dorothy Holston (1933–2000).

== Death ==
He died in a hospital in Belleville, Illinois on his 67th birthday, September 27, 1969, after undergoing emergency abdominal surgery. He is buried in the House family plot in Greenwood Cemetery.
