= Governor Bond =

Governor Bond may refer to:

- Kit Bond (born 1939), 47th and 49th Governor of Missouri
- Shadrach Bond (1773–1832), 1st Governor of Illinois
