= Posey, Illinois =

- Unincorporated community
- Location within Illinois Location within the United States
- Coordinates: 38°32′13″N 89°21′09″W
- Country: United States
- State: Illinois
- County: Clinton
- Elevation: 456 ft (139 m)

Population
  - Total: 65
- Time zone: UTC-6 (Central (CST))
  - Summer (DST): UTC-5 (CDT)
- Area code: 618
- GNIS feature ID: 416055

Posey is an unincorporated community in Clinton County, Illinois, United States. Posey is near the intersection of Illinois Route 127 and Illinois Route 161 6 miles (9.7 km) east of Bartelso.

G. R. Beckmeyer (1920–1977), Illinois businessman and politician, was born in Posey.
