= Beckmeyer =

Beckmeyer is a surname. Notable people with the surname include:

- G. R. Beckmeyer (1920–1977), American politician and businessman
- Uwe Beckmeyer (born 1949), German politician
