= James W. Stephenson =

American politician and militia officer

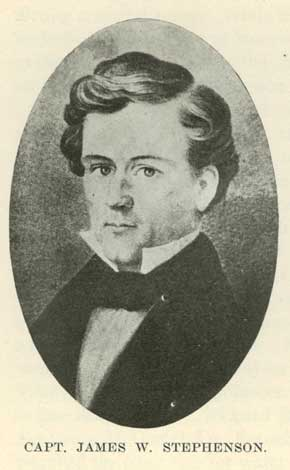
- Born: 1806; Virginia
- Died: 12 August 1838 (Aged 31-32); Galena, Illinois
- Military career
- Allegiance: United States
- Branch: Illinois militia
- Service years: 1832
- Rank: Major
- Conflicts: Battle of Waddams Grove, Sinsinawa Mound raid (Black Hawk War)
- Other work: Illinois State Senator (1834); Democratic nominee for Governor of Illinois (1838)

James W. Stephenson (1806–August 1838) was an American militia officer and politician from the state of Illinois. He was born in Virginia but spent most of his youth in Edwardsville, Illinois. In 1825 he was indicted for the murder of a family acquaintance, but never went to trial. Upon the outbreak of the Black Hawk War in 1832, Stephenson raised a company and saw combat, suffering severe wounds at the Battle of Waddams Grove. After the war ended Stephenson entered public life, and served as a member of the Illinois State Senate in 1834. In December 1837 Stephenson was nominated as the Democratic candidate for Governor of Illinois. Within six months of his nomination, accusations of embezzlement were leveled against him, and he was forced to withdraw from the election. In August 1838, Stephenson died at home of tuberculosis.

== Early life ==
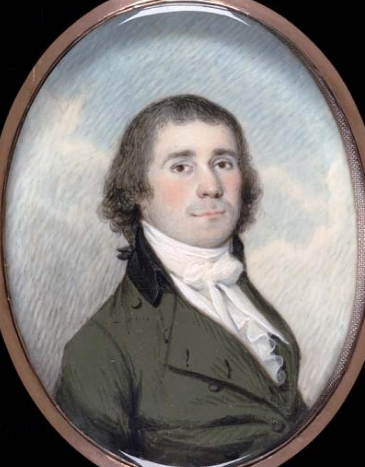
His father, Benjamin Stephenson

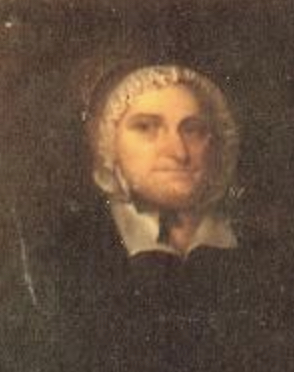
His mother, Lucy Swearingen

James W. Stephenson was born in Virginia in 1806, the oldest son of Benjamin Stephenson and his wife, Lucy Swearingen, and was named in honor of his grandfather and uncle. The Stephenson family came to Edwardsville from Kaskaskia in 1816, and in 1820 the family moved into the Benjamin Stephenson House in Edwardsville.

On January 29, 1825, while at the Wiggins Hotel in lower town, area resident Daniel D. Smith was stabbed to death following an argument with James Stephenson, James Henry and Palemon Winchester. Smith was stabbed in the neck; as those present attended to him, he uttered "Winchester" and died. Reports in Edwardsville's The Spectator indicated that Smith was "killed in an affray" at the Stephenson House. James W. Stephenson, James D. Henry and Palemon Winchester were indicted for Smith's murder. All three men were charged with the crime, though only Stephenson and Henry were released on bond.

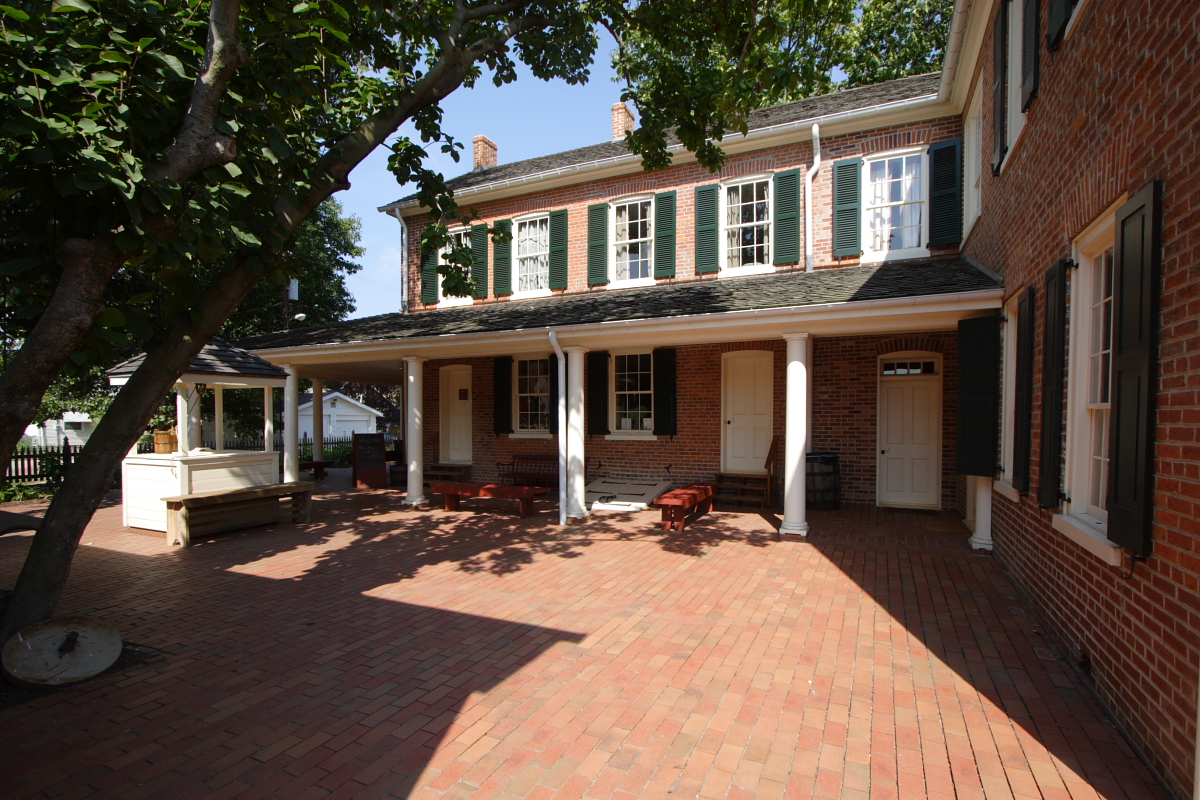
The Benjamin Stephenson House in Edwardsville, Illinois.

Winchester was the only defendant to face trial on the charges. Winchester's lawyer argued that Smith was guilty of verbal assault against the defendant, and Winchester was found not guilty. The verdict was reported in The Spectator on March 22, 1825. In 1828 Stephenson left Edwardsville, and moved to Galena in Jo Daviess County where he made his home for much of the rest of his life.

== Military service ==
=== Background ===
As a consequence of an 1804 treaty between the Governor of Indiana Territory and a group of Sauk and Meskwaki leaders regarding land settlement, the tribes vacated their lands in Illinois and moved west of the Mississippi in 1828. However, Sauk leader Black Hawk and others disputed the treaty, claiming that the full tribal councils had not been consulted, nor did those representing the tribes have authorization to cede lands. Angered by the loss of his birthplace, between 1830–31 Black Hawk led a number of incursions across the Mississippi River into Illinois, but was persuaded to return west each time without bloodshed. In April 1832, encouraged by promises of alliance with other tribes and the British, he again moved his so-called "British Band" of around 1,000 warriors and non-combatants into Illinois. Finding no allies, he attempted to return to Iowa, but the undisciplined Illinois militia's actions led to the Battle of Stillman's Run. A number of other engagements followed, and the militias of Michigan Territory and Illinois were mobilized to hunt down Black Hawk's Band. The conflict became known as the Black Hawk War.

=== Black Hawk War ===
As an officer in the Illinois militia James W. Stephenson served in a combat command capacity during the war. He first raised a company of 134 men in the early stages of the war as a captain, later, he was elected major and his company was taken over by Captain Enoch Duncan. Stephenson's company was mustered into service in May and was released on September 14, 1832.

Stephenson fought in battles during the war as well as playing a role in the prelude and aftermath of some of the fighting. At the June 18, 1832 Battle of Waddams Grove Stephenson led a dozen men against an unknown number of hostile Sauk. The battle, which descended into a hand-to-hand fight, resulted in three of Stephenson's men being killed. Stephenson was shot and severely wounded in the encounter. Though Waddams Grove did little to put an end to Sauk raids in the region, it did help bolster public confidence in the militia. Less than two weeks later, Stephenson was involved in the aftermath of the raid at Sinsinawa Mound, in present-day Grant County, Wisconsin. When news of the attack at Sinsinawa Mound reached Galena, Captain Stephenson set out with 30 soldiers to pursue the raiders. Once at Sinsinawa, they buried the "most shockingly mutilated" dead at the mound; both of the men killed, John Thompson and John Boxley, had been scalped, and Thompson's heart was missing. Stephenson followed the Sauk trail to the Mississippi River and stopped, the raiders having apparently crossed the river. Stephenson's party returned to Galena without finding the group responsible for the attack.

In the week preceding another of the war's major turning points, the June 16 Battle of Horseshoe Bend, Stephenson helped Colonel Henry Dodge and his men bury the victims of the St. Vrain massacre. Stephenson continued on to Galena after assisting in this task and did not accompany Dodge to Horseshoe Bend.

== Political career ==
Stephenson was well-connected, and received letters from prominent people, including Jefferson Davis in 1834. That same year, Stephenson was elected to his first public office, the Illinois State Senate, after which he sought an appointment to the United States General Land Office in Galena. From December 1834 until April 1835 Stephenson was absent from Galena. He spent time in St. Louis, where he married Ellen Kyle in December, then traveled on to Edwardsville and Vandalia, Illinois; the couple eventually had two children. In April 1835 the couple returned to Galena where James took office as Register of Lands at Galena and Chicago, and they lived an elegant lifestyle.

In December 1837, at the first "regularly constituted" Illinois state Democratic convention in Vandalia, James W. Stephenson was nominated as the party's candidate for governor of Illinois. Within six months of his nomination, Stephenson was caught in a funds embezzling scandal, surrounding his time as Register of Lands, and forced to withdraw from the election. The Democrats reconvened their convention on June 6, 1838 and nominated Thomas Carlin, a "most unexceptionable man" who had a reputation for being honest.

Older accounts of Stephenson's withdrawal from the race give differing reasons for his departure. Former Democratic Illinois Governor Thomas Ford's 1854 A History of Illinois stated that Stephenson's reason for withdrawing from the election was "on account of sickness." James Washington Sheahan wrote in his 1860 biography of Stephen A. Douglas that Stephenson's early exit from the election was due to being "charged with being a defaulter." John Moses' 1,316-page work, Illinois, Historical and Statistical (1889), characterized the accusations against Stephenson as "serious charges."

== Death ==
Less than a week after Carlin was elected governor of Illinois, Stephenson died of tuberculosis in August 1838. He died at his home in Galena, at the age of 32. He was buried the day of his death with military honors and left behind his wife, Ellen, and two children Lucy and Kyle.
