= Illinois Territory's at-large congressional district =

Former congressional district

Coordinates: 41.80°N 89.36°W

- Obsolete district
- Created: 1812, as a non-voting delegate was granted by Congress
- Eliminated: 1818, as a result of statehood
- Years active: 1812–1818

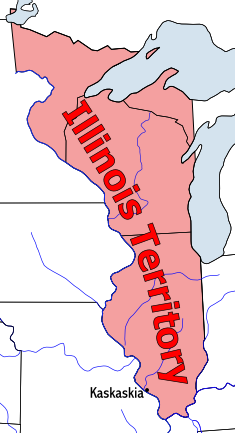
Map of Illinois Territory 1809-1818

Illinois Territory's at-large congressional district was a congressional district that encompassed the entire Illinois Territory. The territory was established on March 1, 1809 from portions of Indiana Territory. The district elected a non-voting delegate to the United States House of Representatives.

== List of delegates representing the district ==
Delegate (Residence)	Party	Years	Cong ress	Electoral history
Shadrach Bond (Kaskaskia)	Democratic-Republican	December 3, 1812 – August 2, 1813	12th 13th	Elected in 1812. [data missing]
Vacant		August 2, 1813 – November 14, 1814	13th	
Benjamin Stephenson (Edwardsville)	Democratic-Republican	November 14, 1814 – November 1816	13th 14th	Elected to two-year term. Retired.
Nathaniel Pope (Kaskaskia)	Democratic-Republican	December 2, 1816 – November 30, 1818	14th 15th	Elected in 1816. Statehood achieved.

== Statehood ==
On April 18, 1818, Congress passed an act that enabled the people of Illinois Territory to begin the process of forming a state. As part of that act, Illinois Territory was reduced in size to the boundaries of the present state. The remainder of what had been Illinois Territory was attached to Michigan Territory. The state of Illinois was accepted into the Union on December 3, 1818.

== See also ==
- Northwest Territory's at-large congressional district
- Wisconsin Territory's at-large congressional district
- Michigan Territory's at-large congressional district
- Minnesota Territory's at-large congressional district
