= WNSV =

Coordinates: 38°26′02″N 89°18′55″W

- Nashville, Illinois; United States
- Broadcast area: Nashville, Illinois; Centralia, Illinois; Breese, Illinois
- Frequency: 104.7 MHz
- Branding: V104.7

Programming
- Format: Adult contemporary

Ownership
- Owner: Withers Broadcasting; (Dana Communications, Inc.)

History
- First air date: July 10, 1994
- Former call signs: WQHC (1990–1992, CP); WNSR (1992–1997); WDRW (1997)
- Call sign meaning: Nashville

Technical information
- Licensing authority: FCC
- Facility ID: 15380
- Class: A
- ERP: 3,400 watts
- HAAT: 134 meters (440 ft)

Links
- Public license information: Public file; LMS
- Webcast: Listen live
- Website: v1047.com

WNSV (104.7 FM, "V104.7") is a radio station broadcasting an adult contemporary format. Licensed to Nashville, Illinois, the station serves the areas around Centralia, Illinois, Breese, Illinois and Nashville, Illinois.
