= Benjamin Stephenson (politician) =

American politician and soldier

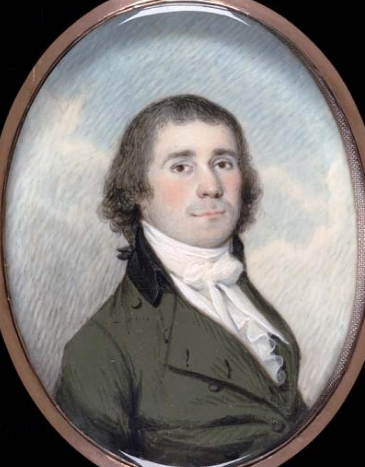

Delegate to the U.S. House of Representatives from the Illinois Territory's At-large district
- In office November 14, 1814 – March 4, 1817
- Preceded by: Shadrach Bond
- Succeeded by: Nathaniel Pope

Personal details
- Born: July 8, 1769 Gettysburg, Pennsylvania, British America
- Died: October 10, 1822 (aged 53) Edwardsville, Illinois, U.S.
- Party: Democratic-Republican
- Spouse: Lucy Swearingen (m. 1805)
- Children: 4, including James W. Stephenson

Military service
- Allegiance: United States
- Branch/service: Illinois Militia
- Rank: Colonel
- Battles/wars: War of 1812

Benjamin Stephenson (July 8, 1769 – October 10, 1822) was the congressional delegate for the Illinois Territory from 1814 until 1816, and a delegate to the Constitutional Convention that made it possible for Illinois to become a state.

== Career ==
Stephenson was born on July 8, 1769 in Gettysburg, Pennsylvania, British America. He moved to Kentucky before his father's death in 1804, and then further westward to the Illinois Territory around 1809, becoming sheriff of Randolph County that same year.

A colonel in the Illinois militia, Stephenson commanded a regiment during the War of 1812. In 1813 he was appointed adjutant general of Illinois. A Democratic-Republican and ally of Governor Ninian Edwards, Stephenson was elected for a two-year term as delegate of the Illinois Territory in the United States Congress from 1814 to 1816, after which he became receiver of Public Monies, appointed by Edwards. Stephenson was a representative to the convention that wrote the first constitution for the State of Illinois in 1818. In 1820, Stephenson owned seven slaves in Madison County.

== Death and legacy ==
Stephenson died on October 10, 1822, and is buried in Edwardsville, Madison County, Illinois. Stephenson County, Illinois was named for him. The Benjamin Stephenson House in Edwardsville, which he finished shortly before his death, remains and was placed on the National Register of Historic Places in 1980. Now owned by the City of Edwardsville, it is one of the oldest houses still standing in the state. His son, James W. Stephenson, went on to become a member of the Illinois Senate.

U.S. House of Representatives
| Preceded by Shadrach Bond | Delegate to the U.S. House of Representatives from the Illinois Territory's at-large congressional district 1814–1816 | Succeeded by Nathaniel Pope |
