= Nathaniel Pope =

American judge and statesman (1784–1850)

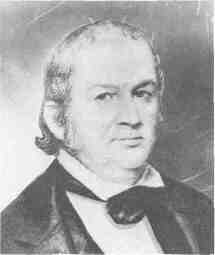

Judge of the United States District Court for the District of Illinois
- In office March 3, 1819 – January 23, 1850
- Appointed by: James Monroe
- Preceded by: Seat established
- Succeeded by: Thomas Drummond

Delegate to the U.S. House of Representatives from the Illinois Territory's at-large district
- In office December 2, 1816 – November 30, 1818
- Preceded by: Benjamin Stephenson
- Succeeded by: John McLean (Representative)

Secretary of the Illinois Territory
- In office April 24, 1809 – December 16, 1816
- Governor: Ninian Edwards
- Preceded by: Seat established
- Succeeded by: Joseph Phillips

Governor of Illinois Territory
- Acting
- In office April 24, 1809 – June 11, 1809*
- Preceded by: Position established
- Succeeded by: Ninian Edwards

Personal details
- Born: January 5, 1784 Louisville, Virginia, U.S. (now Kentucky)
- Died: January 23, 1850 (aged 66) St. Louis, Missouri, U.S.
- Resting place: Bellefontaine Cemetery
- Party: Democratic-Republican
- Education: Transylvania University
- *Pending Edwards' arrival.

Nathaniel Pope (January 5, 1784 – January 23, 1850) was an American government leader in the early history of the State of Illinois. He served as the Secretary of the Illinois Territory, then as a Delegate to the United States House of Representatives from the Illinois Territory, and for over thirty years as the United States district judge for the United States District Court for the District of Illinois.

== Early life and education ==
Born on January 5, 1784, in Louisville in what was then District of Kentucky, Virginia (but became Kentucky in his lifetime), to the former Penelope Sanford Edwards (1757-) and her husband Col. William H. Pope (1740–1825). After a private education appropriate to his class, Nathaniel Pope attended Transylvania University, then read law in 1804.

== Early career ==
Admitted to the bar, Nathaniel Pope entered private practice in Ste. Genevieve, Louisiana Territory (now part of Missouri) in 1804. He later moved across the Mississippi River to practice in Kaskaskia, Indiana Territory, which became part of Illinois Territory on March 1, 1809. When the Illinois Territory was created, President James Madison appointed Kentucky politician John Boyle as the Territorial Governor and Pope as the Territorial Secretary.

Boyle resigned after three weeks to become Kentucky's Chief Justice and was succeeded by Ninian Edwards. Edwards, a lawyer and Maryland politician who had moved to Kentucky and then the Illinois Territory, was related to Pope's mother. Pope served as territorial secretary from 1809 to 1816. He was acting Governor of the Illinois Territory in 1809. He was an Illinois Territorial Militia officer in 1812. Pope was a member of the Democratic-Republican party.

== Congressional service ==
Pope was elected on September 5, 1816, as a Delegate to the United States House of Representatives for a term of two years, serving in the 14th and 15th United States Congresses from December 2, 1816, to November 30, 1818. He was a register for the United States General Land Office in Edwardsville, Illinois Territory (State of Illinois from December 3, 1818) from November 30, 1818, to March 3, 1819.

=== Notable legislation ===
Pope was instrumental both in securing the new territory's admission as the 21st State on December 3, 1818 (the statehood resolution passed regardless of the creative counting to achieve the former minimum of 60,000 persons) as well as in adjusting the new state's northern boundary from the southern extremity of Lake Michigan extending it north to the 42° 30' parallel. Adding the land now included in the thirteen northern counties became very important for Illinois' development, because it included what was to become its largest city (Chicago), although it also slowed Wisconsin's qualification for admission to the Union. Furthermore, Pope drafted the statehood resolution to ensure that 2% of land sales would be used to fund roads and 3% to fund schools, unlike the previous statehood resolutions which required 5% to be used to fund roads.

== Federal judicial service ==
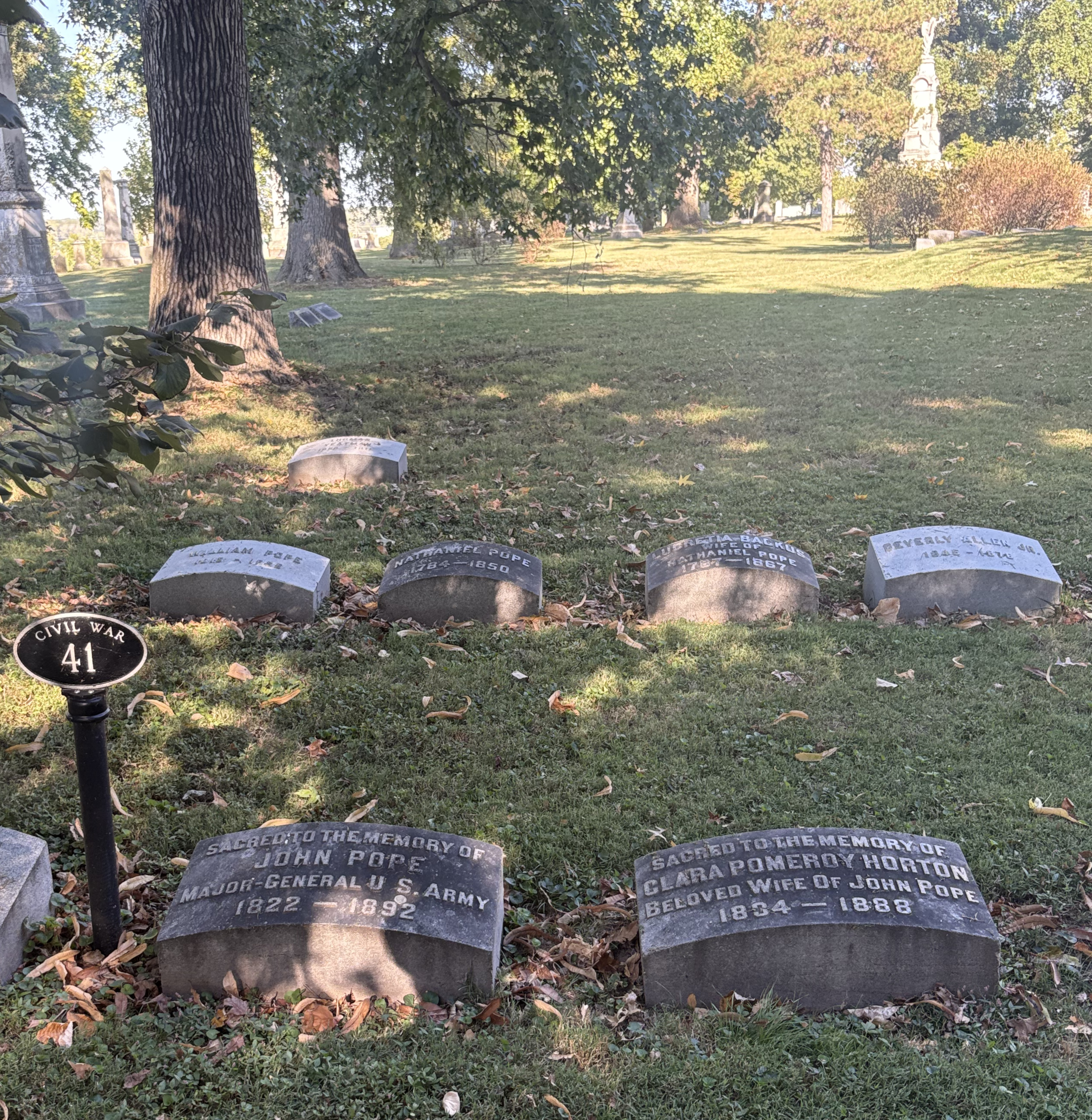
Pope's grave (2nd row, 2nd from left) at Bellefontaine Cemetery

Pope was nominated by President James Monroe on March 3, 1819, to the United States District Court for the District of Illinois, to a new seat authorized by 3 Stat. 502. He was confirmed by the United States Senate on March 3, 1819, and received his commission the same day. His service terminated on January 23, 1850, due to his death in St. Louis, Missouri. He was interred in the Colonel O'Fallon Burying Ground and later reinterred at the Bellefontaine Cemetery in St. Louis.

As a federal judge, Pope notably granted habeas corpus to Mormon leader Joseph Smith to avoid extradition to Missouri over the attempted assassination of Lilburn Boggs, a former governor of Missouri.

=== Unsuccessful campaign ===
Pope was an unsuccessful candidate for election to the United States Senate in 1824.

== Honor ==
Pope County, Illinois, was named for Pope, as was the recently closed Nathaniel Pope Elementary School in North Lawndale, Chicago, Illinois.

== See also ==
- List of United States federal judges by longevity of service

== Sources ==
- "Nathaniel Pope:From Connections and Factional Politics to Champion of Statehood" from Illinois History, December 1993
- United States Congress. "Nathaniel Pope (id: P000432)". Biographical Directory of the United States Congress.

Political offices
New office	Governor of Illinois Territory; Acting; 1809	Succeeded by Ninian Edwards
New office	Secretary of the Illinois Territory; 1809–1816	Succeeded by Joseph Phillips
U.S. House of Representatives
Preceded by Benjamin Stephenson	Delegate to the U.S. House of Representatives from the Illinois Territory's at-large congressional district 1816–1818	Succeeded by John McLean as U.S. Representative
Legal offices
New seat	Judge of the United States District Court for the District of Illinois; 1819–1850	Succeeded by Thomas Drummond
