= G. R. Beckmeyer =

American politician and businessman

Mayor of Nashville, Illinois
- In office 1970–1974

Member of the Illinois House of Representatives
- In office 1955–1956

Personal details
- Born: George Robert Beckmeyer; May 7, 1920 Posey, Illinois, U.S.
- Died: June 7, 1977 (aged 57) St. Louis, Missouri, U.S.
- Party: Republican
- Education: Culver Military Academy; University of Illinois; Wabash College
- Occupation: Politician, businessman

Military service
- Allegiance: United States
- Branch/service: United States Army (United States Army Air Forces)
- Battles/wars: World War II

George Robert Beckmeyer (May 7, 1920 – June 7, 1977) was an American politician and businessman.

Beckmeyer was born in Posey, Illinois. He went to the Nashville, Illinois public schools and Culver Military Academy. Beckmeyer served in the United States Army Air Forces during World War II. Beckmeyer went to University of Illinois and Wabash College. He was involved with the retail department store and real estate businesses in Nashville, Illinois. Beckmeyer served in the Illinois House of Representatives in 1955 and 1956 and was a Republican. In 1966, Beckmeyer ran for the United States House of Representatives and lost the election. He also served as mayor of Nashville, Illinois from 1970 to 1974. Beckmeyer died at the veterans hospital at the Jefferson Barracks Military Post in St. Louis, Missouri. He had been ill for one month.
