= Nashville, Illinois =

- City
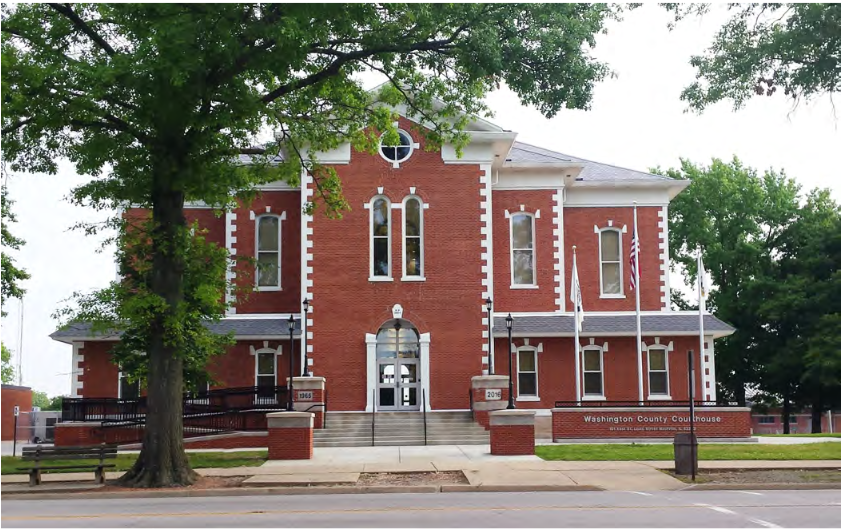
- Washington County Courthouse
- Interactive map of Nashville, Illinois
- Location within Illinois Location within the United States
- Coordinates: 38°21′45″N 89°22′27″W
- Country: United States
- State: Illinois
- County: Washington
- Founded: June 8, 1830
- Named for: Nashville, Tennessee

Government
  - Mayor: Raymond Kolweier

Area
  - Total: 3.17 sq mi (8.20 km^{2})
  - Land: 3.08 sq mi (7.98 km^{2})
  - Water: 0.089 sq mi (0.23 km^{2})
- Elevation: 472 ft (144 m)

Population (2020)
  - Total: 3,105
  - Density: 1,008.3/sq mi (389.32/km^{2})
- Time zone: UTC-6 (CST)
  - Summer (DST): UTC-5 (CDT)
- ZIP code: 62263
- Area code: 618
- FIPS code: 17-51700
- GNIS ID: 2395154

Nashville is a city in Washington County, Illinois, United States. As of the 2020 census, the city population was 3,105. It is the county seat of Washington County.

== History ==
Nashville was originally called New Nashville; under the latter name, it was laid out in 1830. The local post office was established as Nashville in 1831.

On July 16, 2024, approximately 200 residents were evacuated because the failure of the Nashville Dam was considered imminent after the region received 5 inches of rain in 6 hours.

== Geography ==
According to the 2010 census, Nashville has a total area of 2.809 square miles (7.28 km^{2}), of which 2.72 square miles (7.04 km^{2}) (or 96.83%) is land and 0.089 square miles (0.23 km^{2}) (or 3.17%) is water.

Nashville is located on Nashville Creek, at the headwaters of Little Crooked Creek, which flows northwest into the Kaskaskia River. Just to the southeast of Nashville is the headwaters of Beaucoup Creek, which flows south into the Big Muddy River. Nashville is thus situated next to the Kaskaskia/Big Muddy divide.

== Demographics ==
Historical population
Census	Pop.	Note	%±
1860	872		—
1870	1,640		88.1%
1880	2,222		35.5%
1890	2,084		−6.2%
1900	2,184		4.8%
1910	2,135		−2.2%
1920	2,209		3.5%
1930	2,243		1.5%
1940	2,418		7.8%
1950	2,432		0.6%
1960	2,606		7.2%
1970	3,027		16.2%
1980	3,186		5.3%
1990	3,202		0.5%
2000	3,147		−1.7%
2010	3,258		3.5%
2020	3,105		−4.7%
U.S. Decennial Census

=== 2020 census ===
As of the 2020 census, Nashville had a population of 3,105. The median age was 42.4 years. 21.5% of residents were under the age of 18 and 22.2% of residents were 65 years of age or older. For every 100 females there were 91.9 males, and for every 100 females age 18 and over there were 89.1 males age 18 and over.

0.0% of residents lived in urban areas, while 100.0% lived in rural areas.

There were 1,301 households in Nashville, of which 28.1% had children under the age of 18 living in them. Of all households, 44.0% were married-couple households, 18.5% were households with a male householder and no spouse or partner present, and 30.4% were households with a female householder and no spouse or partner present. About 36.0% of all households were made up of individuals and 17.4% had someone living alone who was 65 years of age or older.

There were 1,423 housing units, of which 8.6% were vacant. The homeowner vacancy rate was 1.7% and the rental vacancy rate was 5.1%.

Racial composition as of the 2020 census
Race	Number	Percent
White	2,900	93.4%
Black or African American	42	1.4%
American Indian and Alaska Native	9	0.3%
Asian	30	1.0%
Native Hawaiian and Other Pacific Islander	6	0.2%
Some other race	10	0.3%
Two or more races	108	3.5%
Hispanic or Latino (of any race)	60	1.9%

=== 2000 census ===
As of the 2000 census, there were 3,147 people, 1,324 households, and 884 families residing in the city. The population density was 1,173.9 inhabitants per square mile (453.2/km^{2}). There were 1,421 housing units at an average density of 530.1 per square mile (204.7/km^{2}). The racial total of the city was 98.73% White, 0.16% African American, 0.13% Native American, 0.38% Asian, 0.10% Pacific Islander, 0.19% from other races, and 0.32% from two or more races. Hispanic or Latino people of any race were 0.79% of the population.

There were 1,324 households, out of which 31.6% had children under the age of 18 living with them, 54.3% were married couples living together, 10.3% had a female householder with no husband present, and 33.2% were non-families. 30.4% of all households were made up of individuals, and 17.4% had someone living alone who was 65 years of age or older. The average household size was 2.36 and the average family size was 2.92.

In the city, the population was spread out, with 24.6% under the age of 18, 7.4% from 18 to 24, 27.5% from 25 to 44, 22.3% from 45 to 64, and 18.3% who were 65 years of age or older. The median age was 39 years. For every 100 females, there were 87.1 males. For every 100 females age 18 and over, there were 85.2 males.

The median income for a household in the city was $42,097, and the median income for a family was $51,875. Males had a median income of $34,020 versus $24,010 for females. The per capita income for the city was $21,935. About 1.9% of families and 4.4% of the population were below the poverty line, including 2.8% of those under age 18 and 9.6% of those age 65 or over.

== Education ==
Primary schools

- One public school - Nashville Grade School
- One parochial school - Trinity-St. John Lutheran School

Secondary school

- One public high school - Nashville Community High School District 99

== Economy ==
A few manufacturing businesses have sites in Nashville. Nascote Industries is an automobile parts manufacturer that is part of Magna International; its Nashville plant was established in 1985 and employs over 1,000 people. Grupo Antolin owns the other auto parts manufacturing plant in Nashville, employing 522 people as of 2018. The second plant was originally established in 1987 as Ligma Corporation, a joint venture between Magna International and Lignotock G.m.b.H. of Germany. Norrenberns Truck Service, a trucking and warehouse outfit that was founded in 1925, was acquired in 1981 as a one-truck operation, moved to Nashville a few years later, where it has since expanded to 130 trucks and a staff of 275 people in 2004. Prior to Ligma and Nascote Industries, the town's biggest employer was National Mine Service Company (now part of the Marmon Group), which shut down operations in Nashville in 1983 and put 240 people out of work.

== Media ==
Nashville is served by both WNSV, the only FM station in the county, and The Washington County News, a weekly newspaper.

== Notable people ==
- G. R. Beckmeyer, Illinois state representative, businessman, and former mayor of Nashville
- Harry Blackmun, U.S. Supreme Court Justice, born in Nashville in 1908
- William St. John Forman, former U.S. Representative and former mayor of Nashville
- Hugh Green, Illinois politician, born near Nashville
- Byron O. House, Chief Justice of the Illinois Supreme Court, lived in Nashville
- Lloyd A. Karmeier, Illinois Supreme Court Justice, lives in Nashville and was a Circuit Court judge for the area
- Ralph L. Maxwell, Illinois Supreme Court Justice, born in Nashville
- Thomas B. Needles, Illinois politician
- Royce Newman, offensive lineman for the Los Angeles Rams
- Kirk Rueter, former pitcher for the San Francisco Giants
