= Shadrach Bond =

Governor of Illinois from 1818 to 1822

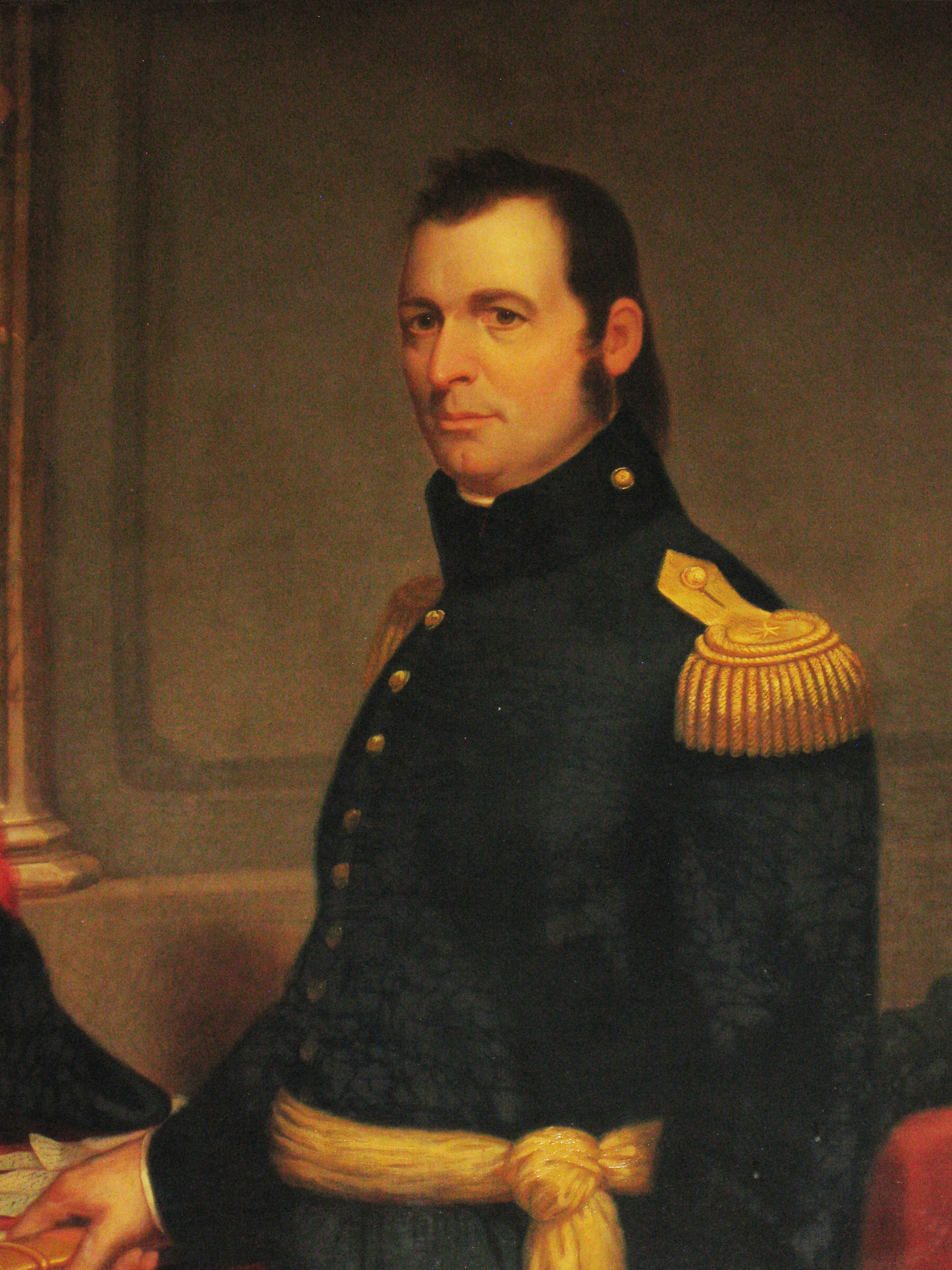
- Bond's Portrait in the Illinois State Capitol's Hall of Governors

1st Governor of Illinois
- In office October 6, 1818 – December 5, 1822
- Lieutenant: Pierre Menard
- Preceded by: Ninian Edwards (Illinois Territory)
- Succeeded by: Edward Coles

Delegate to the U.S. House of Representatives from the Illinois Territory's at-large district
- In office December 3, 1812 – August 2, 1813
- Preceded by: Constituency established
- Succeeded by: Benjamin Stephenson

Personal details
- Born: November 24, 1773 Frederick, Maryland, British America
- Died: April 12, 1832 (aged 58) Kaskaskia, Illinois, U.S.
- Party: Democratic-Republican
- Spouse: Achsah Bond
- Children: 3

Shadrach Bond (November 24, 1773 – April 12, 1832) was a representative from the Illinois Territory to the United States Congress. In 1818, he was elected governor of Illinois, becoming the new state's first chief executive. In an example of American politics during the Era of Good Feelings, Bond was elected to both positions without opposition.

== Early life and career ==
Bond was born in 1773 in Frederick, Maryland the son of Nicodemus, a landowner, and Rachel (Stevenson) Bond. He had nine siblings like Benjamin, though most of the siblings' identities are unknown. He had twelve Illinois Country connections through his uncle, also named Shadrach Bond, a scout with George Rogers Clark's Illinois Regiment in the American Revolutionary War. Because they held some of the same offices in Illinois, the two Bonds are sometimes confused; the uncle is usually known as Shadrach Bond Sr. The young Bond learned from his uncle of the rich farmland of the Illinois Territory and emigrated to the American Bottom, an especially fertile section of the Mississippi River basin. In 1794, Bond's family would move to what is now Monroe County where he would be an Illinois farmer for the remainder of his life, his labor was overshadowing his rather plain education. Shadrach Bond was made a Freemason in Temple Lodge No. 26, Reisters Town, Baltimore County, Maryland. When he moved to Illinois, he became a member of lodge The Western Star Lodge No. 107, Kaskaskia, Territory of Indiana on December 27, 1806. On November 27, 1810, Bond married his distant cousin Achsah Bond, and they had two sons, Thomas Shadrach and Benjamin Nicodemus, as well as five daughters, Julia Rachel, Mary Achsah, Isabella Fell and two unnamed. Bond was elected Illinois' first Grand Master when the first Illinois Grand Lodge was constituted on December 11, 1822.

== Political career ==
A Democratic-Republican, Bond was elected to the Indiana Territorial Council. After Illinois Territory was organized, he was elected to the United States House of Representatives. When Illinois was admitted to the Union, Bond was elected the first governor. His inauguration took place on October 6, 1818, at the initial state capital of Kaskaskia.

As Illinois's first governor, Bond led a new state that had sterling prospects but almost no transportation infrastructure or cash in hand. Bond made transportation his top priority as governor, along with education. Because the state had almost no money, the General Assembly passed and Bond signed bills to build privately operated toll roads and bridges, headed by a road connecting the state's then capital, Kaskaskia on the Mississippi River, with what was then the state's largest city, Shawneetown, on the Ohio River. The road was built and eventually taken over by the state of Illinois as a state highway. After almost two centuries of improvements, much of it is now part of Illinois Route 13. Legislature also passed a bill that put taxes on the land non-residents owned to improve the newly formed state's lack of money. Bond had a method to lease salt springs.

Bond was less successful in his advocacy for a canal that would connect Lake Michigan and the Illinois River (the Illinois and Michigan Canal). The canal was eventually built in the 1840s, long after Bond had left office.

Governor Bond was deeply concerned about arson. The Illinois criminal law made arsonists eligible for the death penalty, along with persons guilty of rape and murder. The governor was by no means exclusively concerned with appearing to be tough on crime, however. He took steps to abolish the whipping post and pillory for misdemeanor offenses.

Bond's most controversial act was his attempt to veto an act passed by the General Assembly to create a non-capitalized State Bank of Illinois. The bank was ready to issue banknotes based on the prospect of future economic growth within Illinois. Bond considered this dishonorable and felt that there should be no banks chartered by the state government of Illinois until the State had enough specie (gold and silver coin) to support the value of its banknotes. The undercapitalized bank was chartered anyway, and promptly went bankrupt, justifying Bond's concerns.

== Retirement ==
After Bond's single term as governor, he returned to his Kaskaskia farm. He was no longer in the center of Illinois politics, as the General Assembly had moved the state capital from Kaskaskia to Vandalia. President James Monroe appointed Bond chief record keeper of the Kaskaskia land office, an important job in a land-hungry frontier state. As a respected local leader, Bond also helped to raise the local share of funding to secure the construction of the state's first penitentiary in Alton. In the early 1830s Bond was elected Master of his Masonic Lodge.

== Personal life ==
Bond was a Methodist-Episcopalian. Bond married his distant cousin, Achsah, on November 27, 1810, at Nashville, Tennessee. They had seven children; Rachel, Mary Achsah, Isabella Fell, Thomas Shadrach, Benjamin Nicodemus, and two unnamed daughters. Bond was also popular with females. He was also noted for being six feet long and weighed an estimate of 200 pounds.

== Death ==
Shadrach Bond died of pneumonia on his farm at Kaskaskia in 1832. He is interred in Evergreen Cemetery in Chester, and his grave is marked by the Governor Bond State Memorial. In September 2008, his obelisk – the tallest and most prominent monument in the cemetery – was toppled by the effects of Hurricane Ike.

== Honors ==
In 1817, Illinois Territory named the newly created Bond County for Shadrach Bond. The honor was bestowed for Bond's service as a congressional delegate; he had not yet become governor. Governor Bond Lake in Greenville, Illinois is also named in honor of Bond.

U.S. House of Representatives
New constituency	Delegate to the U.S. House of Representatives from the Illinois Territory's at-large congressional district 1812–1813	Succeeded by Benjamin Stephenson
Political offices
Preceded by Ninian Edwards as Governor of the Illinois Territory	Governor of Illinois; 1818–1822	Succeeded by Edward Coles
