= Ralph L. Maxwell =

American judge

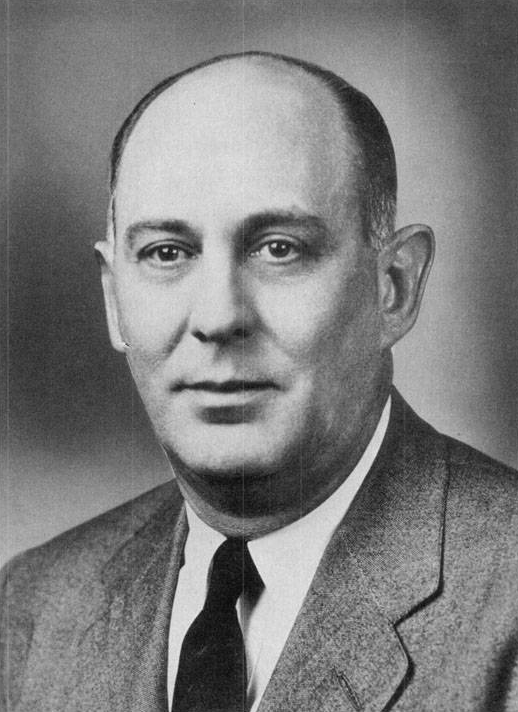
Maxwell's official photograph, c. 1953.

Ralph L. Maxwell (April 9, 1905 – August 29, 1956) was an American jurist.

Born in Nashville, Illinois, Maxwell received his bachelor's degree from University of Illinois Urbana-Champaign in 1931 and his law degree in 1932 from the University of Illinois College of Law. He practiced law in Nashville, Illinois. He served as state's attorney and as circuit court judge for Washington County, Illinois. From 1951 until his death in 1956, Maxwell served on the Illinois Supreme Court.
