= Ell (architecture) =

Wing of a building

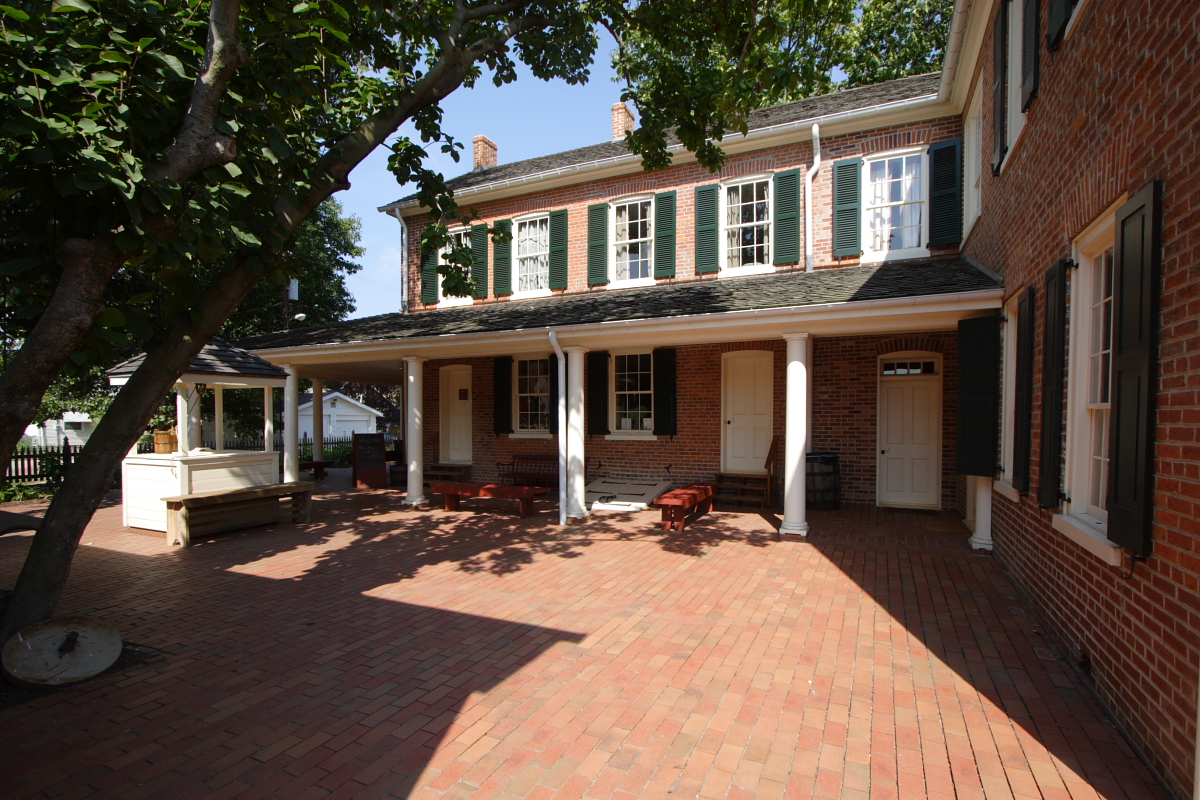
Benjamin Stephenson House's courtyard formed by an ell

In architecture, an ell is a wing of a building perpendicular (at a right angle) to the length of the main portion (main range).

It takes its name from the shape of the letter L. Ells are often additions to a building. Unless sub-wings or a non-rectangular outline floor plan exists such a wing makes the building L-shaped or T-shaped "in plan" (shape from above/below), though if not central nor at one end of the building the T-shape will be an offset T. Where a building is aligned closely to cardinal compass points, such a wing may be more informatively described by its related side of the building (such as "south wing of the building").

== Connected farms and large rural homes ==
In connected farm architecture and homes that were the economic hubs of large grounds including in Mediterranean and northern European traditions, one or more ells (wings) will usually be extended to attach the main house or range to another building, such as a barn or stables, or a tower or chapel or defensive range in the case of a castle or palace. In formal and early modern settings it may take the form of a well-sunlit long gallery; or it may be a plant-growing section or open-sided walkway, if outdoors, a colonnade, plant-covered walkway (pergola) or the indoor analog, a gallery conservatory.

== See also ==
- Hyphen (architecture)
