= Illinois Territory =

Territory of the U.S. between 1809–1818

Coordinates: 41.80°N 89.36°W

Territory of Illinois
- Organized incorporated territory of the United States
- 1809–1818
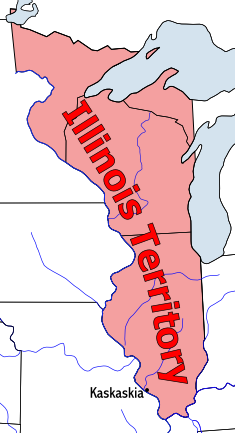
- Capital: Kaskaskia
- Population
  - 1810: 12,282
- Government
  - Type: Organized incorporated territory
- Governor
  - 1809–1818: Ninian Edwards
- Secretary
  - 1809–1816: Nathaniel Pope
  - 1816–1818: Joseph Phillips
- History
  - Established by Congress: March 1, 1809
  - Military Tract of 1812 created in western Illinois: May 6, 1812
  - Granted statehood: December 3, 1818
  - Added to the Flag of the United States: July 4, 1819
Preceded by	Succeeded by
Indiana Territory	Illinois; Michigan Territory

The Territory of Illinois was an organized incorporated territory of the United States that existed from March 1, 1809, until December 3, 1818, when the southern portion of the territory was admitted to the Union as the State of Illinois. Its capital was the former French village of Kaskaskia on the Mississippi River (which is still a part of the State of Illinois). The northern half of the territory, modern Wisconsin and parts of modern Minnesota and Michigan became part of the Territory of Michigan in 1818.

== History of the area ==
The area was earlier known as "Illinois Country" (Pays des Illinois) while under French control, first as part of French Canada and then in its southern region as part of French Louisiana. The British gained authority over the region east of the Mississippi River from the French, with the 1763 Treaty of Paris marking the end of the French and Indian War and of the French North American colony of New France.

During the American Revolutionary War, Colonel George Rogers Clark took possession of the region for Virginia, which established the "County of Illinois" to exercise nominal governance over the area. Virginia later (1784) ceded nearly all of its land claims north of the Ohio River to the Federal government of the United States.

The area became part of the United States' Northwest Territory (from July 13, 1787, until July 4, 1800), and then part of the Indiana Territory. On February 3, 1809, the 10th United States Congress passed legislation establishing the Illinois Territory, after Congress received petitions from residents in the Mississippi River areas complaining of the difficulties of participating in territorial affairs in Indiana Territory. The portions of the Illinois Territory north of what became the State of Illinois were in 1818 annexed to Michigan Territory, and after several administrative arrangements became a part of the Upper Peninsula of Michigan (1837), the State of Wisconsin (1848), and a northern section of the State of Minnesota (1858).

== Boundaries ==
The Illinois Territory originally included lands that became the states of Illinois, Wisconsin, the eastern portion of Minnesota, and the western portion of the upper peninsula of Michigan. As part of Illinois Territory’s statehood process, the Territory retroceded its Wisconsin lands. Congress reassigned the ceded lands to Michigan Territory.

The original boundaries of the Territory were defined as follows: "...all that part of the Indiana Territory which lies west of the Wabash river, and a direct line drawn from the said Wabash river and Post Vincennes, due north to the territorial line between the United States and Canada..."

Kaskaskia was the territorial capital. The 1810 census showed a population of 12,282.

In the 1810 United States census, 2 counties in the Illinois Territory reported the following population counts:

Rank	County	Population
1	Randolph	7,275
2	St. Clair	5,007
	Illinois Territory	12,282

== Officials ==
Ninian Edwards served as governor of the territory during its entire existence. Its secretaries were:

- Nathaniel Pope (1809–1816)
- Joseph Phillips (1816–1818)

== End of the Territory ==
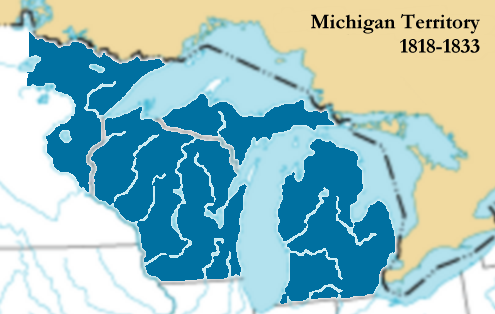
Between 1818 and 1833, after Illinois became a state, the unincorporated land from the territory, plus a handful of other townships, was made part of the Michigan Territory.

In 1818, the southern half of the territory was admitted to the United States as the State of Illinois. The northern half, modern Wisconsin and parts of modern Minnesota and Michigan became part of the Territory of Michigan.

== See also ==
- Frontier Illinois
- Historic regions of the United States
- History of Illinois
- Illinois Country
- Illinois Territory's At-large congressional district
- Illinois-Wabash Company
- List of governors of dependent territories in the 19th century
- List of governors of Illinois
- Military Tract of 1812
- Territorial evolution of the United States
