= Confiscation Acts =

1861–63 anti-slavery laws

The Confiscation Acts were laws passed by the United States Congress during the Civil War with the intention of freeing the slaves still held by the Confederate forces in the South.

The Confiscation Act of 1861 authorized the confiscation of any Confederate property by Union forces ("property" included slaves). This meant that all slaves that fought or worked for the Confederate military were confiscated whenever court proceedings "condemned" them as property used to support the rebellion. The bill passed in the United States House of Representatives 60–48 and in the Senate 24–11. The act was signed into law by President Lincoln on August 6, 1861.

The Confiscation Act of 1862 was enacted on July 17, 1862. It stated that any Confederate official, military or civilian, who did not surrender within 60 days of the act's enactment would have their slaves freed in criminal proceedings. However, this act was only applicable to Confederate areas that had already been occupied by the Union Army.

Although President Lincoln was concerned about the practical legality of these acts and believed that they might push the border states towards siding with the Confederacy, he nonetheless signed them into law. The growing movement towards emancipation was aided by these acts, which were followed by the Preliminary and Final Emancipation Proclamations of September 1862 and January 1863.

== Background ==
"The Union defeat at the First Battle of Bull Run on July 21, 1861, jolted Congress into a realization that the Civil War might not be the swift, neat confrontation they hoped for – and that disunionists might need to be held legally liable for their actions. Lincoln biographer John Torrey Morse, Jr. wrote, "The Northern armies ran against slavery immediately.... [T]housands of slaves at Manassas were doing the work of laborers and servants, and rendering all the whites of the Southern army available for fighting. The handicap was so severe and obvious, that it immediately provoked the introduction of a bill freeing slaves belonging to rebels and used for carrying on the war."

"In the first summer of the Civil War, President Abraham Lincoln called the Thirty-seventh United States Congress into special session on July 4, 1861. On August 6, the last day of this short first session, Congress passed and Lincoln signed the First Confiscation Act. This law authorized the federal government to seize the property of all those participating directly in rebellion. Enacted in the wake of the first battle of Bull Run, this hurriedly passed law did not break much new ground. It was essentially a restatement of internationally recognized laws of war and authorized the seizure of any property, including slave property, used by the Confederacy to directly aid the war effort."

When the second session of the Thirty-seventh Congress convened in December 1861, public pressure was mounting in the North for another, more vigorous confiscation bill. Senator Lyman Trumbull, a Republican from Illinois and the chairman of the Judiciary Committee, quickly emerged as the most important figure on confiscation. On December 2, 1861, Trumbull took the floor to introduce a new confiscation bill. This bill envisioned the seizure of all rebel property, whether used directly to support the war, or owned by a rebel a thousand miles away from any battlefield.

After several months of debate, Congress came to a stalemate over the confiscation of rebel property. This paralysis was not the result of incompetence, or because confiscation was considered relatively unimportant; it was instead an issue of ideological differences debated by a country in the midst of war. The debate, to the surprise and ultimate frustration of the legislators themselves, reflected deep-seated, nearly intractable divisions over the social role of property and the extent of sovereign power over property in American law and the Constitution.

Within a few weeks of the introduction of Trumbull's bill, different ideological coalitions emerged. Trumbull took the lead of a group of radicals sponsoring a vigorous confiscation bill, joined by Charles Sumner of Massachusetts and Benjamin Wade of Ohio in the Senate and George Julian of Indiana in the House. To their amazement these confiscation radicals soon faced bitter opposition both from outside and from within their own Republican Party. A group of conservatives soon began to condemn the radical bill as a violation of the Fifth Amendment and the Constitution's prohibition of bills of attainder. Republican senator Orville Browning of Illinois, a powerful friend of President Lincoln, led these conservatives in condemning the radical confiscation plan. As winter turned to spring and spring to summer, Congress argued endlessly over confiscation. Was property confiscation a legitimate power of the national legislature? Was confiscation in violation of the Constitution? Were slaves a type of property subject to confiscation? These basic questions drew intense scrutiny and the congressional debates were remarkable for their sustained consideration, in the midst of war, of the power of government and the rights of property.

Between these two warring camps, a group of confiscation moderates brokered a compromise bill that, unfortunately, proved mostly unworkable. These moderates were led by John Sherman of Ohio, Daniel Clark of New Hampshire, and Henry Wilson of Massachusetts in the Senate, and Republican Thomas D. Eliot of Massachusetts in the House. The moderates sent Trumbull's bill to a select committee, where they reworked it into a much less radical bill providing a much greater role for the judiciary than the radicals wanted. On July 17, President Lincoln signed the Second Confiscation Act into law, after first insisting that Congress pass an "explanatory resolution" to the act. This resolution reflected President Lincoln's concern that permanent property confiscation was a "corruption of blood" prohibited by the Constitution and provided that property seized from individual offenders under the act could not be seized beyond the lifetime of the offender. President Lincoln had fully intended to veto the bill if Congress did not pass his resolution, and in an effort to ensure his objections were an official part of the congressional record, after signing the bill he also sent the veto message he had prepared to Congress."

== Provisions ==
The First Confiscation Act, signed into law on August 6, 1861 stated that:

- Weapons must be seized from all citizens with intent to rebel.
- Weapons are to be retrieved from the field of battle so as not to be returned to rebellious persons.

The Second Confiscation Act was signed into law on July 17, 1862 and contained provisions such as:

- A final ruling on the permanent status of escaped slaves. While the first act did not make any determination on the final outcome of escaped slaves after the war was over, the second act stated the all slaves owned by people who supported or participated in the rebellion, and all slaves in rebel territory captured by the Union, "shall be forever free of their servitude, and not again held as slaves."
- The Union Army has the right to take any and all personal property from rebellious persons.
- Captured fugitive slaves are not to be returned to their owners, but are to be forfeit to the Union Army. The act banned all members of the military from ever returning escaped slaves, including escaped slaves from Union states.

== Implementation ==
The Union Army was given primary control over implementation of the acts. However, Congress reached a stalemate that impeded the implementation of these Acts.

== Consequences ==
"Essentially, the Confiscation Act of 1862 prepared the way for the Emancipation Proclamation and solved the immediate dilemma facing the army concerning the status of slave," even though the act was not heavily enforced.

== See also ==
- Emancipation Proclamation
