= War Governors' Conference =

Political event, American Civil War

Coordinates: 40.5149°N 78.4021°W

The Logan House Train Platform. (From "History of the Pennsylvania Railroad," 1875.)

The Loyal War Governors' Conference was an important political event of the American Civil War. It was held at the Logan House Hotel in Altoona, Pennsylvania, on September 24 and 25, 1862. Thirteen governors of Union states came together to discuss the war effort, state troop quotas, and the ultimate support of President Abraham Lincoln and his Emancipation Proclamation. The leaders also suggested the removal of General George B. McClellan as commander of the Army of the Potomac. The meeting was established and hosted by Pennsylvania Governor Andrew Gregg Curtin, who was a staunch defender of the war effort and Lincoln Administration policies. Ultimately, the event provided Lincoln much-needed support from the Northern states.

== History of the meeting ==
In the late summer of 1862, the war effort was going poorly for the United States and President Abraham Lincoln. The commander-in-chief wished to release a proclamation that would free the slaves in the southern states, but he was afraid to do so for fear that the Union's border states still practicing slavery would secede. If he issued the proclamation prematurely, it would appear as a last cry for help to both the country and the world. Lincoln needed a military victory so that he could announce the Preliminary Emancipation Proclamation.

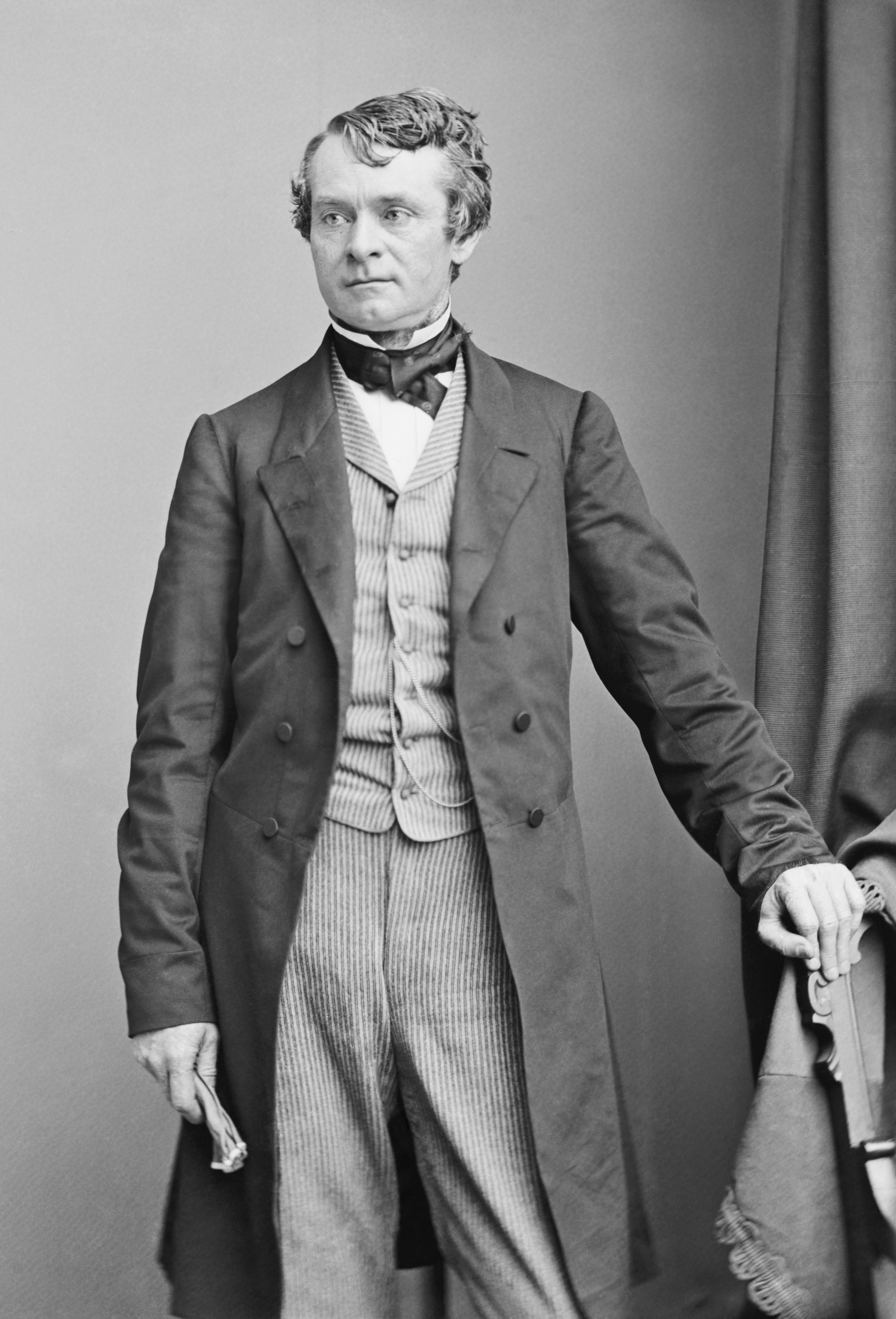
Curtin of Pennsylvania formed the conference.

Governor Andrew Gregg Curtin of Pennsylvania sent out a telegram invitation on September 6 to all Union governors to "meet at a point in the border states" to discuss the states' involvement in the war effort. Governor Andrew of Massachusetts, another radical and sometime opponent of Lincoln, supported the meeting in order to promote more radical measures such as emancipation that he thought were the only path to victory, writing that he hoped "to save the Prest. from the infamy of ruining his country" (Neely, ed., Lincoln Encyclopedia, p. 5). Altoona, Pennsylvania would be that "point" of location for the meeting.

The Battle of Antietam on September 17, 1862, allowed Lincoln to claim the victory he so desperately needed, and he issued the Preliminary Emancipation Proclamation on September 22. This key event would be a main topic among the governors. The state executives began to arrive at the Logan House Hotel in Altoona on September 23. The city was the ideal location for the meeting: it was near both the Midwest states as well as New England, and it also provided excellent transportation and luxury due to the massive Pennsylvania Railroad center that was based in Altoona. In fact, during the Gettysburg campaign, the city was strongly considered by Confederate General Robert E. Lee as a potential target should his forces have gotten that far.

As more governors and delegates arrived, crowds of local onlookers and politicians began to gather on the train platform beside the hotel to get a better look at the dignified guests. Even General John Alexander McClernand and staff, who were passing through Altoona, decided to observe the spectacle. Also in attendance was a reporter from the New York Herald. (The article about the conference appeared on the front page of this periodical on September 29, 1862.) The day before the meeting was to begin, the governors who had arrived so far took a sight-seeing trip to the famous Horseshoe Curve, compliments of John Edgar Thomson and the Pennsylvania Railroad.

The meeting began the next morning. At that point, eleven governors, one representative, and a number of aides were in attendance. After an initial welcome by Governor Curtin, the group went right to business, debating a number of topics. These included ways they could support the Preliminary Emancipation Proclamation and how their individual states could aid the war effort.

One of the main topics of discussion concerned General George B. McClellan, commander of the Army of the Potomac. Governor John Andrew of Massachusetts took to the floor and openly began to criticize General McClellan's ability as a leader. Governor William Sprague of Rhode Island agreed, claiming that the Battle of Antietam fought less than a week earlier had been "a rebel victory," and that the Confederates had not withdrawn "because they were defeated, but exhibited great military strategy in doing so." Governor David Tod of Ohio stated that he could not understand why some would want to remove McClellan and that he would block any attempt to do so. The debate continued until 12:30 a.m. until the topic was exhausted.

Despite the many heated debates that took place during the meeting, all governors except Augustus Bradford of Maryland consented to the final address. Bradford's disapproval is most likely a result of Maryland still being a slave state. In the morning, Governor Austin Blair of Michigan arrived late but joined the fellow delegates in going to Washington, D.C. the same day. With Blair's name, a total of twelve signatures were included on the address to be presented to the president. No official minutes of the meeting were kept for security reasons. Perhaps because of this, the event is often overlooked by historians.

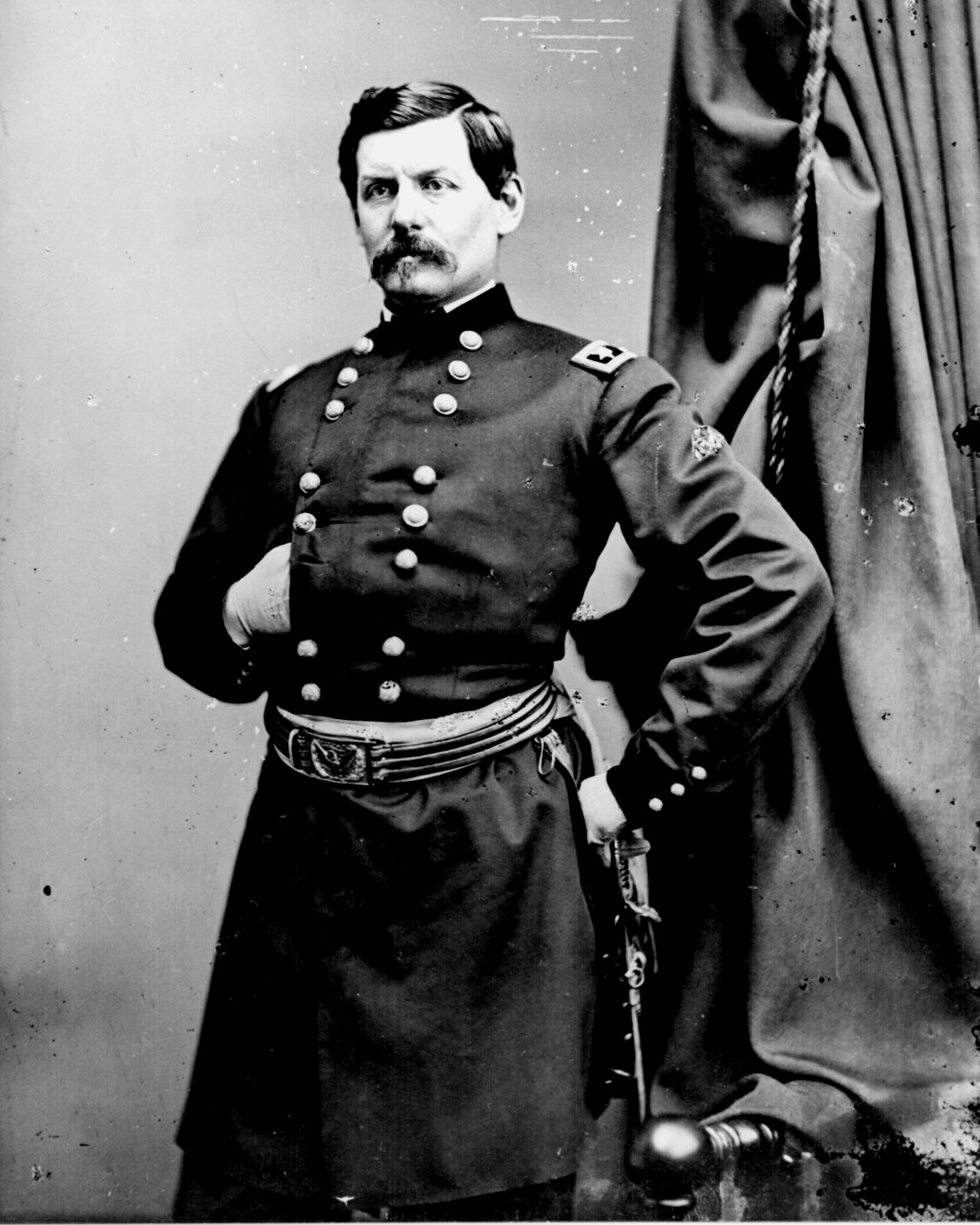
Many of the governors were displeased with Gen. George McClellan (above).

Once the delegation reached the White House on September 26, they read the document proclaiming the "rightful authority" of the president and "the constitutional powers of Congress" depend on "the rights and liberties of the people." The governors agreed "to continue in the most vigorous exercise of all our lawful powers, contending against treason, rebellion, and the public enemies until final victory and unconditional submission." The address went on to promote "the military education of the people." Lincoln took their welcomed suggestions on internal management of the war effort, including recruiting, transport of troops, etc. However, the meeting became contentious when Governor Kirkwood of Iowa suggested that General McClellan was unfit for command. Lincoln refused to argue either way on the issue, and promptly concluded the meeting. Nevertheless, McClellan was relieved of command less than two months later and the Emancipation Proclamation came into effect on January 1, 1863.

The address was sent to other Union governors that were unable to attend the meeting. Of them, the executives of Vermont, Connecticut, Kansas, Minnesota, and Oregon all gave their approval of the document. It was declined by those of New York, New Jersey, Delaware, Kentucky, and Missouri, the latter three of which were still slave states.

== Results of the meeting ==
The Loyal War Governors' Conference is often overlooked in the history of the American Civil War. However, it can be argued that it played an important role in the policies of Abraham Lincoln. The President now had the re-affirmed support of the northern states to finish the war. In observance of the 50th anniversary of the event, the Altoona Mirror stated, "It was this conference...which more than any other thing strengthened Lincoln's hands in the darkest hour of the war period."

The Emancipation Proclamation legally freed slaves in the seceded states and parts of states that were not under Union control. It did not affect slavery in the border states, or in those areas of Virginia, Tennessee, and Louisiana that were already occupied by Union forces. The proclamation influenced countries such as Britain and France against recognizing the Confederacy. Public sentiment in those countries was largely opposed to supporting states that maintained the institution of slavery. Coincidentally, Lincoln suspended the Writ of Habeas Corpus in the United States the very same day that the governors met in Altoona. It is not known whether these two events are connected in any way. However, because of the meeting in Altoona, Lincoln was able to issue such a document with a new sense of authority and commitment that was delivered by the northern governors and the victory at Antietam.

Governors in Attendance

Governor	State	Approval of Declaration
John A. Andrew	Massachusetts	Yes
Nathaniel S. Berry	New Hampshire	Yes
Austin Blair	Michigan	Yes
Augustus Bradford	Maryland	No
Andrew G. Curtin	Pennsylvania	Yes
Samuel Kirkwood	Iowa	Yes
Oliver P. Morton (rep. by D.G. Rose)	Indiana	Yes
Francis H. Pierpont	Virginia (Loyal)	Yes
Edward Salomon	Wisconsin	Yes
William Sprague	Rhode Island	Yes
David Tod	Ohio	Yes
Israel Washburn	Maine	Yes
Richard Yates	Illinois	Yes

== The Logan House and anniversary ceremonies ==
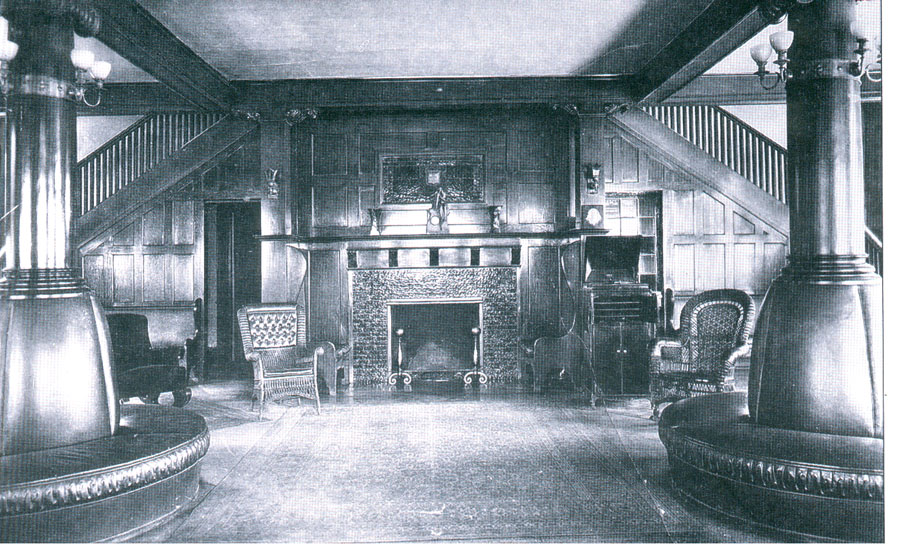
Logan House lobby in its later years

The Logan House Hotel, where the conference was held, was built in 1854 by the Pennsylvania Railroad. Dubbed "Mansion in the Wilderness," it was considered one of the grandest hotels in the country at the time. With 106 rooms, gas lighting, and hot running water, it was believed to be one of the most modern hotels of its age. One visitor stated that the hotel was "about the size of Rhode Island." Famous visitors to the hotel included presidents Ulysses S. Grant, Rutherford B. Hayes, and William Howard Taft. Mary Todd Lincoln and her children spent a few summer days at the Hotel to escape the heat and congestion of Washington, D.C. Just a year after the Governors' Conference, David Wills of Gettysburg held a meeting there to begin plans for the establishment of the Gettysburg National Cemetery where Lincoln would deliver his immortal Gettysburg Address. The hotel was closed in 1927 and the building was demolished in 1931. It is now the site of the Altoona Post Office.

In 1912, a massive ceremony was held in Altoona to celebrate the 50th anniversary of the conference. All the northern governors of the respective states at that time attended. Even President Taft came to Altoona to take part in the festivities and give an address to the large crowds.

According to personal accounts and old photographs, bunting, decorations, and special events were everywhere. A massive parade was held on 11th Avenue downtown. This parade included old veterans of the Civil War and a massive float with a model of the USS Monitor including a revolving turret. Dozens of other large floats were entered as well by local groups. At the Cricket Field sports arena (now the site of a commercial retail plaza in front of the Altoona Hospital), a large festival with vendors, food, and souvenirs helped in commemorating the event.

== See also ==
- List of United States governors
- Act Prohibiting the Return of Slaves
