= Logan House Hotel =

Hotel in Altoona, Pennsylvania

Coordinates: 40.514°N 78.402°W

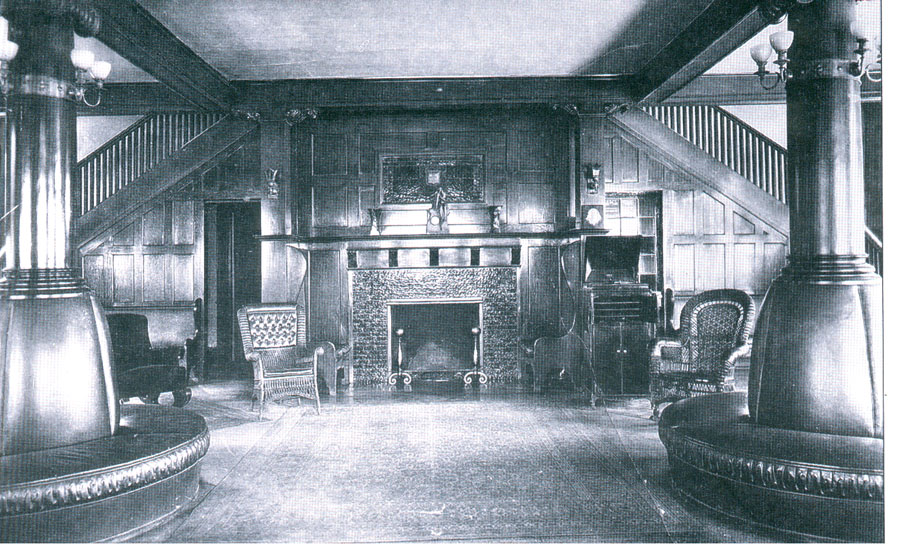
Lobby of the Logan House Hotel

The Logan House Hotel was a historic hotel that was located in Altoona, Pennsylvania. The hotel was in operation from the 1850s to the 1920s, when it was demolished.

== History ==
The Logan House Hotel was built between 1852 and 1853 by Thomas Burchinell, a carpenter who worked for the Pennsylvania Railroad. The three-story, 106-room hotel was located close to Altoona's train station, which sat on an important rail line between Harrisburg and Pittsburgh.

The hotel was documented as having heated water and gas lighting, and was reportedly named after Chief Logan, a local Native American chief who had lived in the area in the eighteenth century.

In 1862, the hotel was the site of the War Governors' Conference, a meeting in which several high-profile governors of United States states affirmed their support for the Union during the-then ongoing American Civil War.

The Logan House Hotel was closed in 1927. The property was then sold, in 1931, to the United States government, which built a post office on the site.
