= Confiscation Act of 1861 =

Act of US Congress to seize property used in support of Confederate efforts

- Long title: An Act to confiscate Property used for Insurrectionary Purposes.
- Announced in: the 37th United States Congress

Citations
- Public law: Pub. L. 37–60
- Statutes at Large: 12 Stat. 319

Legislative history
- Introduced in the Senate as S. 25 by Lyman Trumbull (R–IL) on July 15, 1861; Passed the Senate on July 22, 1861 (33-6); Passed the House on August 3, 1861 (60-48) with amendment; Senate agreed to House amendment on August 5, 1861 (24-11); Signed into law by President Abraham Lincoln on August 6, 1861

The Confiscation Act of 1861 was an act of Congress during the early months of the American Civil War permitting military confiscation and subsequent court proceedings for any property being used to support the Confederate independence effort, including slaves.

The bill passed the House of Representatives 60–48 and in the Senate 24–11. Abraham Lincoln was reluctant to sign the act; he felt that, in light of the Confederacy's recent battlefield victories, the bill would have no practical effect and might be seen as a desperate move. He was also worried that it could be struck down as unconstitutional, which would set a precedent that might derail future attempts at emancipation. Only personal lobbying by several powerful senators persuaded Lincoln to sign the legislation, which he did on August 6, 1861. As the bill was based on military emancipation, no preceding judicial proceedings were required to seize the property and therefore Lincoln gave Attorney General Edward Bates no instructions on enforcing the bill. Within a year of its passage, tens of thousands of slaves had been freed by the First Confiscation Act.

With respect to slaves, the act authorized court proceedings to strip their owners of any claim to them but did not clarify whether the slaves were free. As a result of this ambiguity, these slaves came under Union lines as property in the care of the U.S. government. In response to this situation, General David Hunter, the Union Army military commander of Georgia, South Carolina, and Florida, issued General Order No. 11 on May 9, 1862, freeing all slaves in areas under his command. Upon hearing of Hunter's action one week later, Lincoln immediately countermanded the order, thus returning the slaves to their former status as property in the care of the federal government.

Before the act was passed, Benjamin F. Butler had been the first Union general to declare slaves as contraband. Some other Northern commanders followed this precedent, while officers from the border states were more likely to return escaped slaves to their masters. The Confiscation Act was an attempt to set a consistent policy throughout the army.

== Text of the act ==
An Act to confiscate Property used for Insurrectionary Purposes.

It has been enacted by the Senate and House of Representatives of the United States of America in Congress assembled, That if, during the present or any future insurrection against the Government of the United States, after the President of the United States shall have declared, by proclamation, that the laws of the United States are opposed, and the execution thereof obstructed, by combinations too powerful to be suppressed by the ordinary course of judicial proceedings, or by the power vested in the marshals by law, any person or persons, his, her, or their agent, attorney, or employée, shall purchase or acquire, sell or give, any property of whatsoever kind or description, with intent to use or employ the same, or suffer the same to be used or employed, in aiding, abetting, or promoting such insurrection or resistance to the laws, or any person or persons engaged therein; or if any person or persons, being the owner or owners of any such property, shall knowingly use or employ, or consent to the use or employment of the same as aforesaid, all such property is hereby declared to be lawful subject of prize and capture wherever found; and it shall be the duty of the President of the United States to cause the same to be seized, confiscated, and condemned.

SEC. 2. And be it further enacted, That such prizes and capture shall be condemned in the district or circuit court of the United States having jurisdiction of the amount, or in admiralty in any district in which the same may be seized, or into which they may be taken and proceedings first instituted.

SEC. 3. And be it further enacted, That the Attorney-General, or any district attorney of the United States in which said property may at the time be, may institute the proceedings of condemnation, and in such case they shall be wholly for the benefit of the United States; or any person may file an information with such attorney, in which case the proceedings shall be for the use of such informer and the United States in equal parts.

SEC. 4. And be it further enacted, That whenever hereafter, during the present insurrection against the Government of the United States, any person claimed to be held to labor or service under the law of any State, shall be required or permitted by the person to whom such labor or service is claimed to be due, or by the lawful agent of such person, to take up arms against the United States, or shall be required or permitted by the person to whom such labor or service is claimed to be due, or his lawful agent, to work or to be employed in or upon any fort, navy yard, dock, armory, ship, entrenchment, or in any military or naval service whatsoever, against the Government and lawful authority of the United States, then, and in every such case, the person to whom such labor or service is claimed to be due shall forfeit his claim to such labor, any law of the State or of the United States to the contrary notwithstanding. And whenever thereafter the person claiming such labor or service shall seek to enforce his claim, it shall be a full and sufficient answer to such claim that the person whose service or labor is claimed had been employed in hostile service against the Government of the United States, contrary to the provisions of this act.

APPROVED, August 6, 1861

== See also ==
- 1862 Act Prohibiting the Return of Slaves
- Emancipation Proclamation
- Slave Trade Acts
- Confiscation Acts
- Forty acres and a mule
- Special Field Orders No. 15
