= Abraham Lincoln (Morse books) =

Book by John Torrey Morse

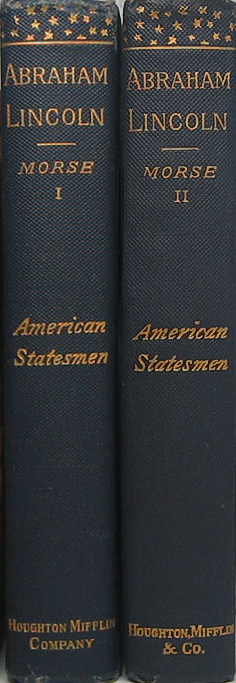
- Author: John T. Morse
- Genre: Biography
- Publication date: 1899
- Publication place: United States

Abraham Lincoln is a 2-volume biography of Abraham Lincoln written by John Torrey Morse, and published in 1893 and 1899, respectively.

The New York Times found the first volume to be "for its scope, admirable. It will even stand up and appear respectable in the most distinguished company of Lincoln biographies that might be assembled." The author is "a sane biographer, who brings to the task of writing about Lincoln a mind that aspires to see clear and think straight, instead of one held slavishly subject to a heart's desire to make Lincoln out a hero without fault or blemish." The Atlantic Monthly noted that Morse had "attempted a bit of scientific painting and not a portraiture to the life. The book is a criticism, consequently, rather than an appreciation." They also noted that Morse concentrates mostly on the five years that Lincoln was in office.

At least one reviewer for The New York Times mentioned several errors that were found in the 1899 publication.

In 1987, Gabor Boritt noted that Morse was the first biographer to have "fully exemplified as well as diagnosed the above ailment [the schism between the self-serving, not very admirable politician that Lincoln was up until 1860 versus the later "unparalleled greatness"]." Quoting Morse, Boritt added that Morse wrote of "the insoluble problem of two men — two lives — one following the other with no visible link.... we have physically one creature, morally and mentally two beings."
