= John Torrey Morse =

American historian and biographer (1840–1937)

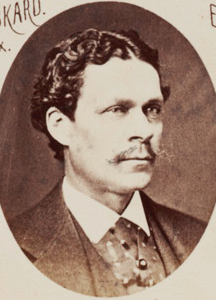
- Morse c. 1875

Member of the Massachusetts House of Representatives from the 6th Suffolk district
- In office January 6, 1875 – January 5, 1876 Serving with Charles R. Codman and William E. Perkins
- Preceded by: Frederic W. Lincoln Jr.
- Succeeded by: Henry Lee; David L. Webster; Robert D. Smith

Personal details
- Born: January 9, 1840 Boston, Massachusetts
- Died: March 28, 1937 (aged 97) Needham, Massachusetts
- Education: Harvard College (A.B.)

John Torrey Morse Jr. (January 9, 1840 – March 28, 1937) was an American historian, attorney, and politician.

== Biography ==
John Torrey Morse was born in Boston, Massachusetts, on January 9, 1840, to John Torrey Morse Sr. and Lucy Cabot Jackson.

He graduated from Harvard College in 1860 after three years of study and read law in the office of John Lowell. He was admitted to the bar in 1862.

In 1874, he was elected to the Massachusetts House of Representatives from the 6th Suffolk district in Boston's Back Bay. He served a one-year term.

From 1879 to 1891, Morse was an elected member of the Harvard Board of Overseers. In 1911, Harvard awarded him an honorary degree as Doctor of Literature.

=== Literary work ===
Morse began his career writing several legal treatises on banking, arbitration, and award, considered authoritative in their day, and contributing to periodicals. His legal writing gained him recognition as a leading expert on the subjects.

In 1876, Morse published a biography of Alexander Hamilton in two volumes, considered his most significant work. Soon after, in 1880, he abandoned his legal career for literary pursuits.

From 1879 to 1881, Morse was a co-editor of the International Review with future United States Senator Henry Cabot Lodge. Morse was later the editor of the American Statesmen Series (Houghton Mifflin Company) to which Lodge contributed biographies of Hamilton, Daniel Webster, and George Washington.

He also wrote biographies of John Adams, John Quincy Adams, Thomas Jefferson, Abraham Lincoln, Benjamin Franklin, Thomas Sergeant Perry, Henry Lee, and Dr. Oliver Wendell Holmes. Morse also authored A Treatise on the Law of Banks and Banking, The Law of Arbitration and Award, and Famous Trials.

=== Personal life ===
Morse married Fanny P. Hovey of Boston in 1865. They had a daughter, Charlotte, and two sons, Cabot Jackson Morse and John Torrey Morse III. They lived on Fairfield Street in Boston.

For the final thirty years of his life, Morse lived in Needham, Massachusetts. In October 1934, Morse and his daughter Charlotte were subject to a series of threatening notes demanding $175,000 or, in the alternative, threatening to kidnap Charlotte. After a heavy police presence at his Needham estate and federal and state investigation, the incident subsided.

Morse was a member of the National Institute of Arts and Letters, the Massachusetts Historical Society, and the American Historical Association. He was a member of the private Somerset Club, Algonquin Club, and The Country Club.

=== Death ===
Morse died on March 27, 1937, at his home in Needham. At the time of his death, he was the earliest living graduate of Harvard College and second-oldest living (after fellow Boston attorney Henry Munroe Rogers, widower of Clara Kathleen Rogers).

== Works ==
- The Law of Arbitration and Award (1872)
- Famous Trials: The Tichborne Claimant, Troppmann, Prince Pierre Bonaparte, Mrs. Wharton, The meteor, Mrs. Fair (1874)
- The Life of Alexander Hamilton (1876)
- Benjamin Franklin (1889)
- Thomas Jefferson (1890)
- Abraham Lincoln (1893)
- John Adams (1894)
- Life and Letters of Oliver Wendell Holmes (1896)
- John Quincy Adams (1899)
- A Treatise on the Law of Banks and Banking (1928)

== See also ==
- 1875 Massachusetts legislature
