= Act Prohibiting the Return of Slaves =

1862 U.S. congressional law

- Long title: An Act to Make an Additional Article of War
- Nicknames: Act Prohibiting the Return of Slaves
- Announced in: the 37th United States Congress

Citations
- Statutes at Large: 12 Stat. 354

Legislative history
- Signed into law by President Abraham Lincoln on March 13, 1862

The Act Prohibiting the Return of Slaves is a law passed by the United States Congress during the American Civil War forbidding all officers or persons in the Union military or naval service to return escaped enslaved people to their enslavers with the aid or use of the forces under their respective commands.

As Union armies entered Confederate-occupied territory during the early years of the war, encouraged enslaved people began fleeing behind Union lines to secure their freedom. Some commanders put the escapees to work digging entrenchments, building fortifications, and performing other camp work. Such people escaping slavery came to be called "contraband", a term emphasizing their status as captured enemy property. Other Army commanders returned the escapees to their owners. Congress approved this act, requiring that any officer who violates the same be dismissed from the service upon conviction by a court-martial.

== Text of the act ==
"An act to make an additional article of war" was approved March 13, 1862, with the following wording:

Be it enacted by the Senate and House of Representatives of the United States of America in Congress assembled, That hereafter the following shall be promulgated as an additional article of war for the government of the army of the United States, and shall be obeyed and observed as such:

Article ––. All officers or persons in the military or naval service of the United States are prohibited from employing any of the forces under their respective commands for the purpose of returning fugitives from service or labor, who may have escaped from any persons to whom such service or labor is claimed to be due, and any officer who shall be found guilty by a court-martial of violating this article shall be dismissed from the service.

Sec. 2. And be it further enacted, That this act shall take effect from and after its passage.

== See also ==
- Emancipation Proclamation
- Confiscation Act of 1861
- Slave Trade Act
