= Abraham Lincoln and slavery =

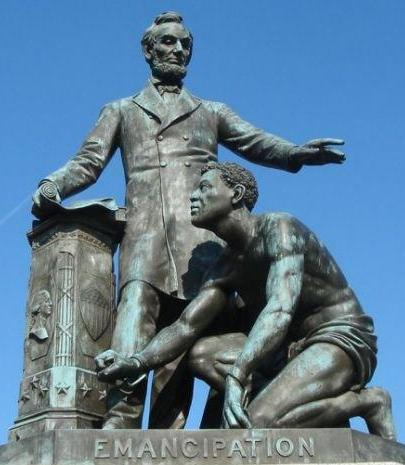
Emancipation Memorial statue placed in Washington, D.C. in 1876

Abraham Lincoln's position on slavery in the United States is one of the most discussed aspects of his life. Lincoln frequently expressed his moral opposition to slavery. In 1858, he said, "I have always hated slavery, I think as much as any Abolitionist". Yet, though Lincoln believed that slavery was a moral, social, and political wrong, he was not an abolitionist until well into the Civil War. He stated in 1837, "The Congress of the United States has no power, under the constitution, to interfere with the institution of slavery in the different states," and, though "the institution of slavery is founded on both injustice and bad policy; ... the promulgation of abolition doctrines tends rather to increase than abate its evils [by driving political support toward slavery]."

Yet, Lincoln often expressed his desire for slavery's end. The question of what to do about slavery and how to end it in a divided nation, given that it was so firmly embedded in the nation's constitutional framework and in the economy of much of the country, even though concentrated in only the Southern United States, was complex and politically challenging. In 1860, Lincoln ran for and won the presidency on a platform to prevent the spread into and abolish slavery in the federal territories, which he believed that Congress could do, even though it could not limit slavery in those states where it existed. The Civil War began early in Lincoln's presidency, after Southern states seceded in order to preserve slavery. Lincoln's position on slavery evolved. He issued the Emancipation Proclamation and promoted abolition by the states. In 1864, he ran and won on a platform to completely abolish slavery everywhere in the country by constitutional amendment.

There was also the question, which Lincoln had to deal with, of what would become of the four million slaves if liberated: how they would earn a living in a society that had almost always rejected them or looked down on their very presence. One solution that Lincoln contemplated until late in the Civil War was the voluntary colonization of former slaves in Africa or Latin America. He also became the first president to support voting rights for some former slaves.

== Evolution of Lincoln's policies ==
In the 1850s, Lincoln was accused of being an abolitionist. But in 1860, he was attacked as not abolitionist enough: Wendell Phillips charged that, if elected, Lincoln would waste four years trying to decide whether to end slavery in the District of Columbia. Many abolitionists emphasized the sinfulness of slave owners, but Lincoln did not. Lincoln tended not to be judgmental. In his 1854 Peoria, Illinois, speech, he said, "I have no prejudice against the Southern people. They are just what we would be in their situation. If slavery did not now exist amongst them, they would not introduce it. If it did now exist amongst us, we should not instantly give it up." In 1865, in his second inaugural address, he said, "It may seem strange that any men should dare to ask a just God's assistance in wringing their bread from the sweat of other men's faces; but let us judge not that we be not judged," and he urged "malice toward none" and "charity for all." Nonetheless, Lincoln suggested, God had judged the nation — "both North and South" — for the "offence" of slavery.

Lincoln focused on what he saw as a more politically practical goal: preventing the expansion of slavery into the new Western territories, which, if it occurred, could lead to new slave states, and if it were prevented would eventually lead to slavery's demise. In addition, the Constitution (Art. IV, sec. 3) gave Congress the power to regulate the territories, whereas the consensus, expressed by Lincoln in his first inaugural address, was that the federal government could not interfere with slavery in the states where it existed.

Lincoln supported excluding slavery from territories with the failed Wilmot Proviso in the 1840s. His 1850s activism was in reaction to the 1854 Kansas–Nebraska Act, designed by his great rival, Illinois Senator Stephen A. Douglas. The Act was a radical departure from the previous law of the Missouri Compromise of 1820, which had banned slavery from all new states north of the 36°30′ parallel (except for Missouri). Lincoln suggested that if slavery were allowed to spread it would block free labor from settling in the new states and, as a result, the entire nation would soon become ever more dominated by slave owners.

After Lincoln was elected, the departure of the Southern members of Congress made it finally possible to abolish slavery in the District of Columbia. The District of Columbia Compensated Emancipation Act of 1862 provided partial compensation to slave owners, paid out of federal funds. Lincoln hoped to persuade the border states of Maryland, Delaware, Kentucky, and Missouri to do likewise, because that would eliminate their incentive to secede from the Union to join the Confederacy. Their secession might result both in the North losing the Civil War and in the continued existence of slavery.

On September 22, 1862, having waited until the North won a significant victory in the battle at Antietam, Lincoln used the power granted to the president under Article II, section 2, of the U.S. Constitution as "Commander in Chief of the Army and Navy" to issue the preliminary Emancipation Proclamation. It provided that, on January 1, 1863, in the states still in rebellion, the enslaved people would be freed. On January 1, 1863, as promised, he issued the final Emancipation Proclamation, which declared "that all persons held as slaves" in "States and parts of States ... in rebellion against the United States" on that day "are, and henceforward shall be free." The proclamation immediately freed on paper millions of the enslaved, but its practical effect was limited until the Union Army was present. Week by week, as the army advanced, more slaves were liberated. The last were freed in Texas on "Juneteenth" (June 19, 1865), which became a federal holiday on June 17, 2021.

Although Lincoln stated in the Emancipation Proclamation that he "sincerely believed [it] to be an act of justice," he issued it as a "military necessity," because he believed that the U.S. Constitution would not permit it on any other basis. The Emancipation Proclamation was a war tactic, because by freeing enslaved people it deprived the South of their labor, and it allowed them to "be received into the armed service of the United States." Lincoln worried about the consequences of his action, fearing a racial divide in the nation. Nonetheless, during his second presidential campaign, he ran on a platform to forever abolish slavery by constitutional amendment.

Until late in his life, Lincoln wanted human rights — the rights listed in the Declaration of Independence (life, liberty, and the pursuit of happiness) and the natural right to eat the bread one earns with one's own hands — for black people, but civil rights, such as the vote, "only on their own soil", that is in their own lands abroad, to which they would move pursuant to voluntary colonization. In the last years of his life, however, after he learned of the bravery and the sacrifices of the United States Colored Troops, Lincoln's views changed. In December 1863 or early 1864, he wrote a private letter to Union General James S. Wadsworth advocating that Black men be granted "universal suffrage, or, at least, suffrage on the basis of intelligence and military service". Then, in March 1864, writing privately to Louisiana governor Michael Hahn, and in April 1865, in his last public speech, which led directly to his assassination, Lincoln again expressed support for voting rights for Black men who were "very intelligent" and those who had served in the Union military. He was the first U.S. President to do so.

== Early years ==
Lincoln was born in a slave state on February 12, 1809, in Hardin County, Kentucky (present-day LaRue County). His family attended a Separate Baptists church, which had strict moral standards and opposed alcohol, dancing, and slavery. The family moved north across the Ohio River to Indiana, where slavery was not allowed, and made a new start in then Perry, now Spencer County, Indiana. Lincoln later noted that this move was "partly on account of slavery" but mainly due to his father's problems with the unclear land title system in Kentucky.

As a young man, he moved west to the free state of Illinois. On January 27, 1838, he delivered his Lyceum address to the Young Men's Lyceum of Springfield, Illinois, and in the address he spoke about slavery. Seven weeks earlier, a mob in Alton, Illinois, across the river from St. Louis, Missouri, had killed Elijah Lovejoy, a Presbyterian minister who had fled St. Louis and was the editor of a newspaper with strong anti-slavery views. "The mood of Illinois when an angry mob killed Lovejoy was pro-slavery, but not only in Illinois. The state legislatures of Connecticut and New York in the mid-1830s passed resolutions stating that slavery was accepted in the U.S. Constitution and that no state had a right to interfere". Lincoln himself had been one of only six in the Illinois House of Representatives to vote against a resolution saying "That we highly disapprove of the formation of abolition societies ... That the right of property in slaves, is sacred ... That the General Government cannot abolish slavery in the District of Columbia, against the consent of the citizens of said District...." "Six weeks later, he and Representative Dan Stone filed a protest to the passage of the resolution—a rarely used device to register strong disagreement".

In 1842, Lincoln married Mary Todd in Springfield, Illinois. She was the daughter of a slaveholder in Kentucky, but she never owned slaves herself and came to oppose slavery as an adult.

== 1840s–1850s ==
=== Legal and political ===
Lincoln, the leader most associated with the end of slavery in the United States, came to national prominence in the 1850s, following the advent of the Republican Party, whose official position was that freedom was "national," the natural condition of all areas under the direct sovereignty of the Constitution, whereas slavery was "exceptional" and local. Earlier, as a member of the Whig Party in the Illinois General Assembly, Lincoln issued a written protest of the Assembly's passage of a resolution stating that slavery should not be abolished in the District of Columbia. In 1841, he won a court case (Bailey v. Cromwell), representing a Black woman, Nance Legins-Costley, and her children who claimed she had already been freed and could not be sold as a slave.

One of Lincoln's earliest expressions of his views on slavery comes from an 1845 letter Lincoln wrote to his friend Williamson Durley, concerning the annexation of Texas. In it, Lincoln said he took no position on annexation, but he added, "It is possibly true, to some extent, that with annexation, some slaves may be sent to Texas and continued in slavery, that otherwise might have been liberated. To whatever extent this may be true, I think annexation an evil." He then explained, "I hold it to be a paramount duty of us in the free states, due to the Union of the states, and perhaps to liberty itself (paradox though it may seem) to let the slavery of the other states alone; while, on the other hand, I hold it to be equally clear, that we should never knowingly lend ourselves directly or indirectly, to prevent that slavery from dying a natural death—to find new places for it to live in, when it can no longer exist in the old."

In 1845, he successfully defended Marvin Pond (People v. Pond) for harboring the fugitive slave John Hauley. In 1847, he lost a case (Matson v. Ashmore et al. for the use of Bryant) representing a slave owner (Robert Matson) seeking to recover fugitive slaves. Michael Burlingame writes, "Lincoln's agreement to represent Matson has been called ... the 'most profound mystery ever to confound Lincoln specialists'...." Burlingame speculates that, "despite his antislavery convictions, Lincoln accepted the Matson case in keeping with what became known in England as the 'cab-rank' rule—stipulating that lawyers must accept the first client who hails them—and with the prevailing Whig view that lawyers should try to settle disputes in an orderly fashion through the courts, trusting in the law and the judges to assure that justice was done."

While a congressman from Illinois in 1846 to 1848, Lincoln supported the Wilmot Proviso, which, if it had been adopted, would have banned slavery in any U.S. territory won from Mexico. Lincoln, in collaboration with abolitionist Congressman Joshua R. Giddings, drafted a bill to abolish slavery in the District of Columbia with compensation for the owners, enforcement to capture fugitive slaves, and a popular vote on the matter. (Slavery in the District of Columbia was not ended until 1862, during Lincoln's presidency, when there were no Southern senators.)

After leaving Congress in 1849 Lincoln largely ignored politics to concentrate on his law practice. He was drawn back by the firestorm over the Kansas–Nebraska Act of 1854, which reversed the longstanding Missouri Compromise and allowed territories to decide for themselves whether they would allow slavery. Lincoln was morally opposed to slavery and politically opposed to any expansion of it. At issue was its extension into the western territories. On October 16, 1854, in his Peoria speech, Lincoln declared his opposition to slavery, which he repeated as he sought the presidency. Speaking in his Kentucky accent, with a very powerful voice, he said that the Kansas-Nebraska Act's "declared indifference, but as I must think, covert real zeal for the spread of slavery, I can not but hate. I hate it because of the monstrous injustice of slavery itself. I hate it because it deprives our republican example of its just influence in the world."

The United States Supreme Court's 1857 decision in Dred Scott v. Sandford appalled Lincoln. In the decision, Chief Justice Roger B. Taney held that Black people were not citizens and "had no rights which the white man was bound to respect". In addition, Taney struck down the Missouri Compromise, which prohibited slavery in territories north of the 36°30′ parallel, as a limitation on slave owners' property rights that exceeded the U.S. Congress's powers under the Constitution. Although Taney hoped that Dred Scott would end all disputes over slavery in the favor of Southern slaveholders, the decision sparked further outrage in the North. Lincoln denounced it as the product of a conspiracy to support the Slave Power and believed that Dred Scott, together with the Kansas–Nebraska Act, could enable slavery to spread into the free states. He argued the decision was at variance with the Declaration of Independence; he said that while the founding fathers did not believe all men equal in every respect, they believed all men were equal "in certain inalienable rights, among which are life, liberty, and the pursuit of happiness." Lincoln first responded to Taney in a speech soon after the decision was handed down, arguing that Taney's decision falsified history and corrupted the nation's founding documents, particularly given Taney's unsupportable effort to read Black people entirely out of the founding of the nation.

Impressed by the strength of racism, especially in his home states of Indiana, Illinois, and Kentucky, Lincoln concluded that, because whites would never allow Blacks to live in America as equals, they would be better off migrating voluntarily to a country outside the United States, ideally in Central America or the Caribbean. He had little faith in the program of the American Colonization Society, whose goal was to colonize American Blacks in Liberia, on the West African coast. In a speech at Peoria, Illinois (transcribed after the fact by Lincoln himself), Lincoln pointed out the immense difficulties of such a task as an obstacle to finding an easy way to quickly end slavery. In a debate in August 1858, he said:

If all earthly power were given to me, ... [m]y first impulse would be to free all the slaves, and send them to Liberia, — to their own native land. But a moment's reflection would convince me that whatever of high hope (as I think there is) there may be in this, in the long run, its sudden execution is impossible.

According to historian Paul Escott, Lincoln favored a system of gradual emancipation that would allow for controlled management of free Negroes. Nonetheless, Lincoln was instrumental in forging antislavery voters into a potent political movement.

=== Letter to Joshua Fry Speed ===
In 1854, Lincoln wrote to Joshua Fry Speed, a personal friend and slave owner in Kentucky:

You know I dislike slavery, and you fully admit the abstract wrong of it.... I also acknowledge your rights and my obligations under the Constitution in regard to your slaves. I confess I hate to see the poor creatures hunted down and caught and carried back to their stripes and unrequited toil; but I bite my lip and keep quiet. In 1841 you and I had together a tedious low-water trip, on a steamboat from Louisville to St. Louis. You may remember, as I well do, that from Louisville to the mouth of the Ohio, there were, on board ten or a dozen slaves shackled together with irons. That sight was a continued torment to me, and I see something like it every time I touch the Ohio [River] or any other slave border. It is not fair for you to assume that I have no interest in a thing which has, and continually exercises, the power of making me miserable. You ought rather to appreciate how much the great body of the Northern people do crucify their feelings, in order to maintain their loyalty to the Constitution and the Union.... How can any one who abhors the oppression of negroes be in favor of degrading classes of white people? Our progress in degeneracy appears to me to be pretty rapid. As a nation we began by declaring that "all men are created equal." We now practically read it "all men are created equal, except negroes." When the Know-nothings get control, it will read "all men are created equal, except negroes and foreigners and Catholics." When it comes to this, I should prefer emigrating to some country where they make no pretence of loving liberty,—to Russia, for instance, where despotism can be taken pure, and without the base alloy of hypocrisy.

=== Lincoln–Douglas debates ===
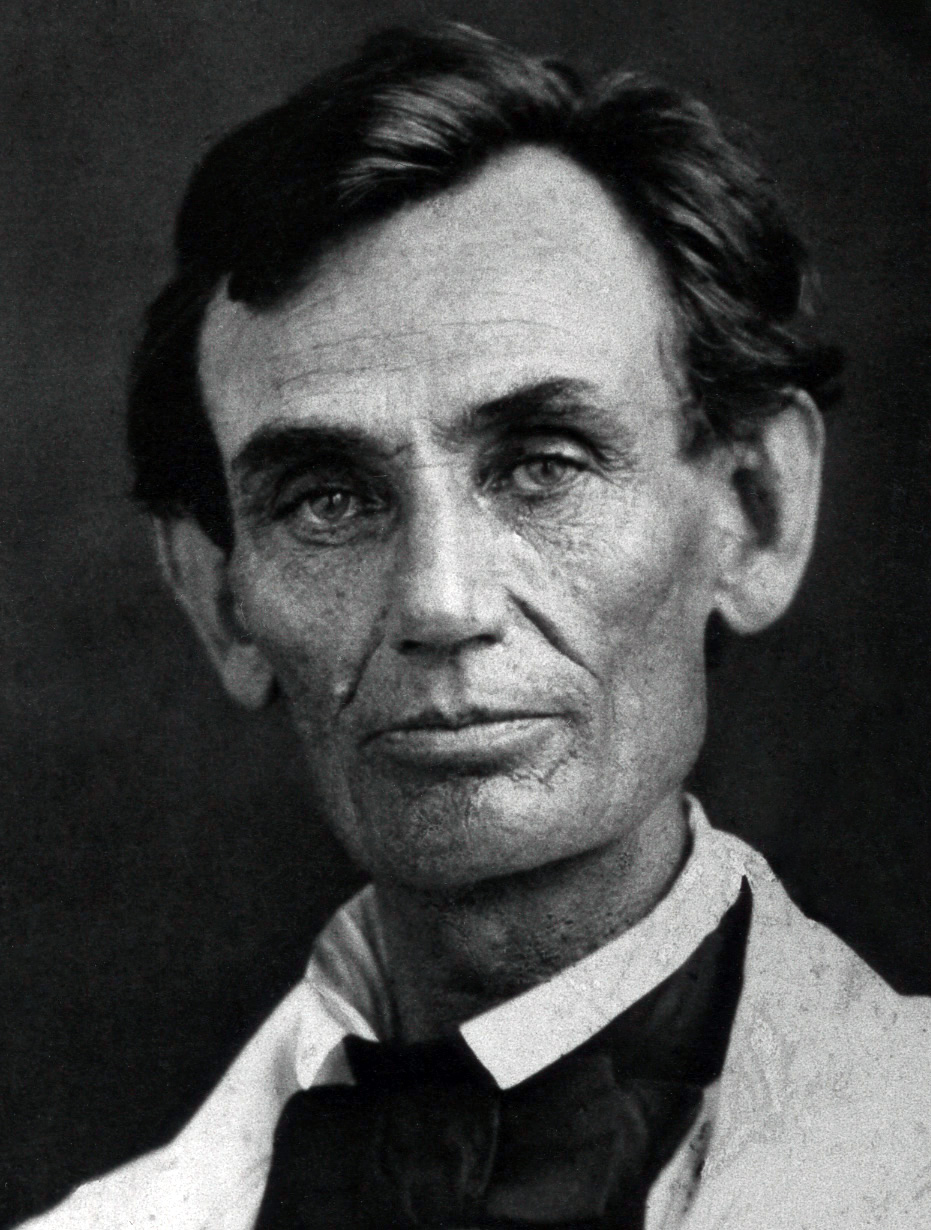
Abraham Lincoln

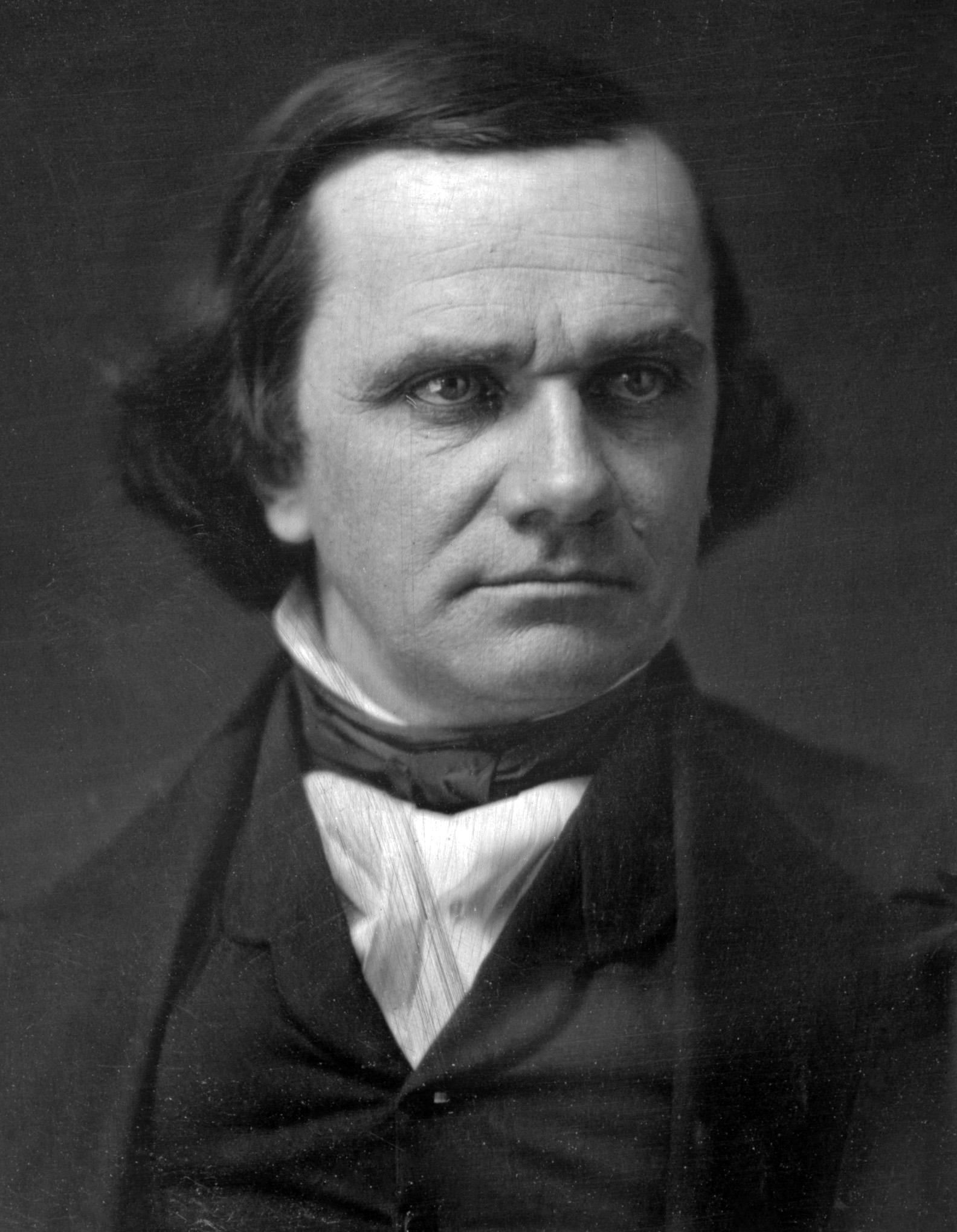
Stephen A. Douglas

Many of Lincoln's public anti-slavery sentiments were presented in the seven Lincoln–Douglas debates against his opponent, Stephen Douglas, during Lincoln's unsuccessful campaign for a seat in the U.S. Senate (which was decided by the Illinois legislature). Douglas advocated "popular sovereignty" and self-government, which would give the citizens of a territory the right to decide if slavery would be legal there. Douglas criticized Lincoln as being inconsistent, saying he altered his message and position on slavery and on the political rights of freed black people in order to appeal to the audience before him, as northern Illinois was more hostile to slavery than southern Illinois.

Lincoln stated that Negroes had the rights to "life, liberty, and the pursuit of happiness" in the first of the Lincoln–Douglas debates, saying:

there is no reason in the world why the negro is not entitled to all the natural rights enumerated in the Declaration of Independence, the right to life, liberty, and the pursuit of happiness. I hold that he is as much entitled to these as the white man. I agree with Judge Douglas he is not my equal in many respects-certainly not in color, perhaps not in moral or intellectual endowment. But in the right to eat the bread, without the leave of anybody else, which his own hand earns, he is my equal and the equal of Judge Douglas, and the equal of every living man."

Lincoln said he was not advocating Negro suffrage in speeches both in Columbus, Ohio, on September 16, 1859, and in Charleston, Illinois, on September 18, 1858, stating on the latter date:

I will say then that I am not, nor ever have been in favor of bringing about in any way the social and political equality of the white and black races, [applause]—that I am not nor ever have been in favor of making voters or jurors of negroes, nor of qualifying them to hold office, nor to intermarry with white people; and I will say in addition to this that there is a physical difference between the white and black races which I believe will forever forbid the two races living together on terms of social and political equality. And inasmuch as they cannot so live, while they do remain together there must be the position of superior and inferior, and I as much as any other man am in favor of having the superior position assigned to the white race. I say upon this occasion I do not perceive that because the white man is to have the superior position the negro should be denied everything. I do not understand that because I do not want a negro woman for a slave I must necessarily want her for a wife. [Cheers and laughter.] My understanding is that I can just let her alone. I am now in my fiftieth year, and I certainly never have had a black woman for either a slave or a wife.

This might have been a strategy speech used to gain voters, as Douglas had accused Lincoln of favoring negroes too much as well.

A fragment from Lincoln dated October 1, 1858, refuting theological arguments by Frederick Augustus Ross in favor of slavery, reads in part, "As a good thing, slavery is strikingly perculiar [sic], in this, that it is the only good thing which no man ever seeks the good of, for himself. Nonsense! Wolves devouring lambs, not because it is good for their own greedy maws, but because it is good for the lambs!!!"

== Constitutional arguments ==
Two diametrically opposed anti-slavery positions emerged regarding the United States Constitution. The Garrisonians emphasized that the document permitted and protected slavery and was therefore "an agreement with hell" that should be rejected in favor of immediate emancipation. Lincoln deeply supported the Constitution and rejected this position. Instead, he adopted and promoted the mainstream anti-slavery position of the new Republican Party. It argued that the Constitution could and should be used to eventually end slavery, but that the Constitution gave the national government no authority to abolish slavery in the states directly. However, multiple tactics were available to support the long-term strategy of using the Constitution as a battering ram against the peculiar institution. First, Congress could abolish slavery in the District of Columbia and the territories. Then, when the territories applied to become states, Congress would admit only free states to the union. That would steadily move the balance of power in Congress and the Electoral College in favor of freedom. Congress could use the Commerce Clause to end the interstate slave trade, thereby crippling the steady movement of slavery from the economically stagnant southeast to the growing southwest. Congress could recognize free blacks as full citizens and insist on due process rights to protect fugitive slaves who were captured from being returned to bondage. Finally, the government could use patronage powers to promote the anti-slavery cause across the country, especially in the border states. Pro-slavery elements considered the Republican strategy to be much more dangerous to their cause than was radical abolitionism, and Lincoln's election was met by secession. Indeed, the Republican strategy mapped the "crooked path to abolition" that prevailed during the Civil War.

== 1860 Republican presidential nomination ==
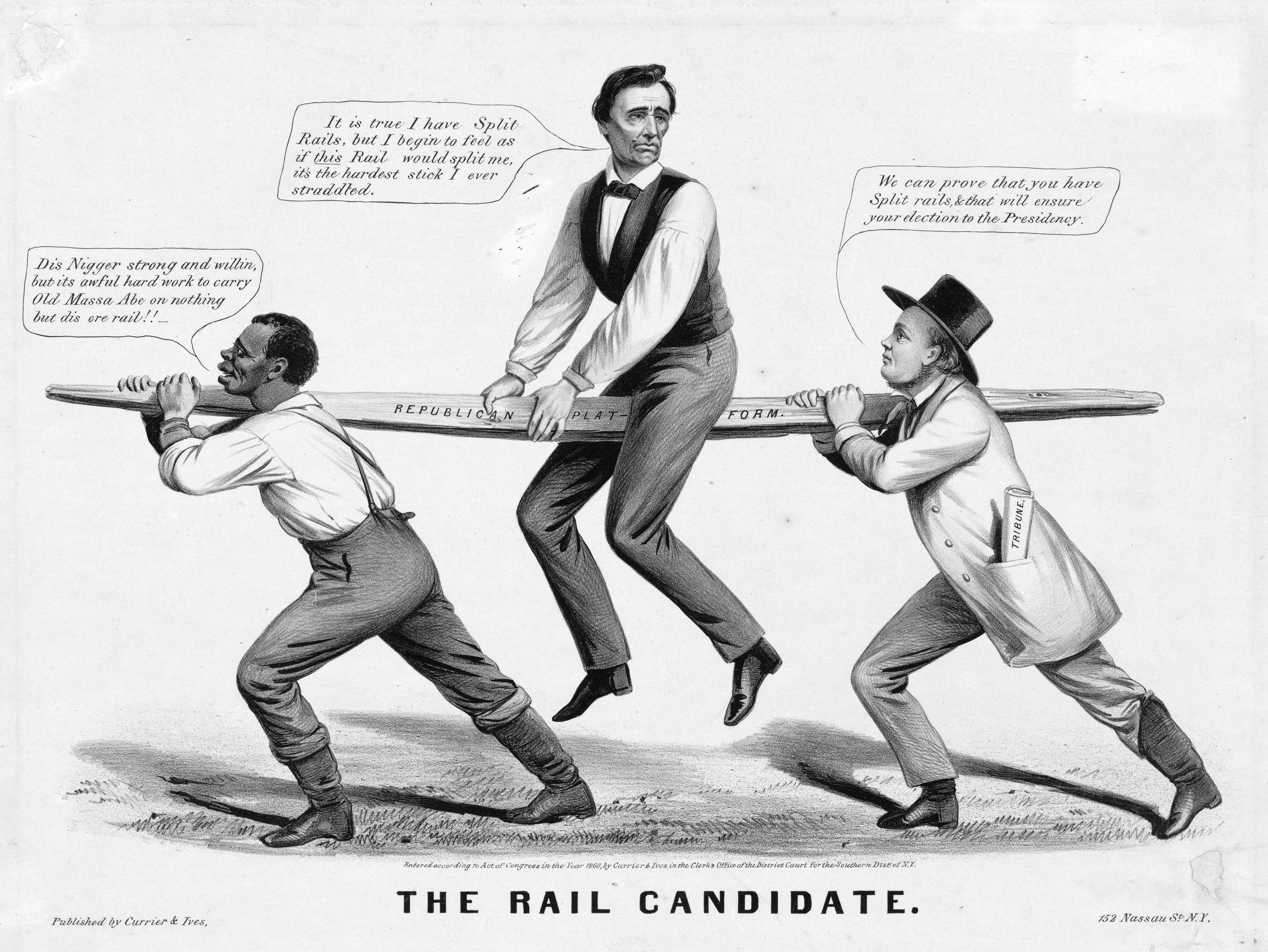
"The Rail Candidate": Lincoln's 1860 candidacy is depicted as held up by the slavery issue—a slave on the left and party organization on the right.

The Republican Party was committed to restricting the growth of slavery, and its victory in the election of 1860 was the trigger for secession by Southern states. The debate before 1860 was mainly focused on the Western territories, especially Kansas and the popular sovereignty controversy.

Lincoln was nominated as the Republican candidate for president in 1860. Lincoln was opposed to the expansion of slavery into the territories, but agreed with nearly all Americans, including most radical abolitionists, that the federal government was prevented by the Constitution from abolishing slavery in states where it already existed. His plan was to halt the spread of slavery and to offer monetary compensation to slave owners in states that agreed to gradually end slavery (see Compensated emancipation). He was considered a moderate within the Republican party in taking the position that slavery should be put on a course of "ultimate extinction" with the help of the federal government.

== As President-elect in 1860 and 1861 ==
Two days after the 1860 United States presidential election, The New York Times summarized Lincoln's views on slavery as opposing its expansion in new territories, accepting its continuance in the South with support from the Fugitive Slave Act of 1850, and leaving the legality of slavery in Washington, D.C. to its voters. The newspaper summarized that "he declares his opposition to negro suffrage, and to everything looking toward placing negroes upon a footing of social and political equity with the whites; but he asserts for them a perfect equality of civil and personal rights under the Constitution."

In a letter to Senator Lyman Trumbull on December 10, 1860, Lincoln wrote, "Let there be no compromise on the question of extending slavery." In a letter to John A. Gilmer of North Carolina of December 15, 1860, which was soon published in newspapers, Lincoln wrote that the "only substantial difference" between North and South was that "You think slavery is right and ought to be extended; we think it is wrong and ought to be restricted." Lincoln repeated this statement in a letter to Alexander H. Stephens of Georgia on December 22, 1860.

On December 15, 1860, Kentucky Senator John J. Crittenden proposed the Crittenden Compromise, a series of constitutional amendments intended to coax the Confederate states into returning to the Union. President-elect Lincoln rejected the Crittenden Compromise out of hand because it would have permitted the expansion of slavery, stating "I will suffer death before I will consent or will advise my friends to consent to any concession or compromise which looks like buying the privilege of taking possession of this government to which we have a constitutional right."

On February 22, 1861, at a speech in Independence Hall, in Philadelphia, Pennsylvania, Lincoln reconfirmed that his convictions sprang from the sentiment expressed in the Declaration of Independence.

== Presidency (1861–1865) ==
=== First inaugural address ===
Lincoln's first inaugural address in March 1861, sympathized with the South and their positions on slavery:

"I have no purpose, directly or indirectly, to interfere with the institution of slavery in the States where it exists. I believe I have no lawful right to do so, and I have no inclination to do so."

=== Corwin amendment ===
The proposed Corwin amendment was passed by Congress before Lincoln became President and was ratified by three states, but was abandoned once the Civil War began. It would have reaffirmed what historians call the Federal Consensus—the nearly universal belief that under the Constitution, the federal government had no power to abolish slavery in a state where it already existed. In his First Inaugural Address, March 4, 1861, Lincoln explained that while he had not seen the amendment and took no position on amendments in general, "holding such a provision to now be implied constitutional law, I have no objection to its being made express and irrevocable." The Corwin amendment was a late attempt at reconciliation but it was doomed to fail because southerners knew that it would not stop the federal government from adopting a host of antislavery policies that did not violate the Federal Consensus. Most significantly, the Corwin amendment would not have interfered with Lincoln's plan to ban the expansion of slavery into the federal territories, which was one of the main points of contention between pro- and anti-slavery factions.

=== Building a demand for emancipation ===
The American Civil War began in April 1861, and by the end of May the Lincoln administration approved a policy of not returning fugitive slaves who came within Union lines from disloyal states. Such slaves were deemed "contraband of war," or "contrabands." On August 6, 1861, Congress declared the forfeiture of contrabands to be permanent by passing the first of the Confiscation Acts, and two days later Lincoln's War Department issued instructions emancipating all the slaves who came within Union lines from disloyal states or owners. By the end of the year thousands of slaves were being emancipated.

So as not to alienate the border states, Lincoln was careful to ensure that his generals followed the letter of the law. He encouraged General James K. Lane in western Missouri to emancipate thousands of slaves of disloyal masters who came voluntarily within his lines. But in eastern Missouri, when General John C. Frémont issued a decree emancipating the slaves of disloyal owners in areas the Union did not control, Lincoln ordered the general to revise his decree to conform with the law. Lincoln promoted Lane to brigadier general but would later fire Frémont for corruption and military incompetence. In western Missouri, Lincoln replaced Frémont with an abolitionist general, David Hunter. The care Lincoln took to distinguish legal from extralegal emancipation was reaffirmed in May 1862, after Hunter issued two emancipation proclamations covering the areas his troops recently occupied "along the Carolina, Georgia, and Florida coast." The first proclamation, which was legal, freed "all persons of color lately held to involuntary servitude by enemies of the United States." The second proclamation declared all the slaves in Georgia, Florida, and South Carolina "to be 'forever free,' not just those belonging to disloyal masters." That second proclamation, like Frémont's, went beyond the law, and Lincoln reversed it, as he had Frémont's.

After revoking Hunter's attempt at emancipation, Lincoln issued a statement explaining that Hunter had issued his proclamation without Lincoln's knowledge or approval, and the authority to free slaves in the rebel states was held only by the President, not his generals. He concluded by referring to a congressional resolution passed in March that stated the federal government's intent to provide compensation to assist states that were willing to voluntarily abolish slavery and encouraged all slave states to come up with a plan to carry it out.

By the end of 1861 tens of thousands of slaves were emancipated as they crossed into Union lines at Fort Monroe, Virginia, the Sea Islands off South Carolina, and in western Missouri. In December the Lincoln administration announced its emancipation policy in a series of annual reports by the president and by several of his cabinet secretaries. By January Lincoln himself declared that no federal authority, civil or military, could legally return fugitive slaves to their owners. By then the sentiment for a more radical approach to emancipation had been building, and in July Congress authorized the president to issue a more general emancipation proclamation, freeing all the slaves in all areas in rebellion. A few days after Lincoln signed the law—known as the Second Confiscation Act—he drafted the first version of what would become his Emancipation Proclamation.

Because the Constitution could sanction emancipation only under the president's war powers, freeing slaves could be justified only as a means of suppressing the Southern rebellion and winning the war. As a result, until the very end of the war, Lincoln claimed that the purpose of the war was the restoration of the Union. Southern leaders denounced Lincoln as a bloodthirsty revolutionary whose emancipation policies proved that the secessionists were right all along about those they labeled "Black Republicans." Northern Democrats, meanwhile, denied that emancipation was a "military necessity," as Lincoln and the Republicans claimed it was. But Lincoln never deviated from his official position, that because the Constitution recognized slavery in the states, the only constitutional justification for freeing slaves was military necessity.

All throughout 1862, the Lincoln administration took several direct actions against slavery. On April 16, Lincoln signed the District of Columbia Compensated Emancipation Act, which abolished slavery in Washington, D.C. Two months later, on June 19, Congress banned slavery in all federal territories, fulfilling Lincoln's 1860 campaign promise to ban the expansion of slavery. On July 17, Congress passed the second of the Confiscation Acts. While the initial act did not make any determination on the final status of escaped slaves who fled to Union lines, the Second Confiscation act did, stating that escaped or liberated slaves belonging to anyone who participated in or supported the rebellion "shall be deemed captives of war, and shall be forever free of their servitude, and not again held as slaves." The act also prohibited anyone in the military from returning escaped slaves to their masters, even if the slaves had escaped from a Union slave state.

=== Meeting with African Americans ===
On August 14, 1862, Lincoln became the first U.S. president to invite a group of African Americans to the White House. He lectured his guests—five men who "were all well-educated members of Washington's black elite" —telling them, "But for your race among us there could not be war". In Douglass' Monthly, Frederick Douglass responded, "No, Mr. President, it is not the innocent horse that makes the horse thief".

Lincoln also told his guests, I think your race suffer very greatly, many of them by living among us, while ours suffer from your presence.... It is better for both of us, therefore, to be separated." Lincoln suggested colonization in Liberia or Central America. Jonathan W. White writes, "Few moments in Lincoln's presidency appear as regrettable as this one.... Lincoln's words were terribly condescending". Yet, White adds, "This meeting was unlike any other. Never again did he lecture a black guest". Why was this meeting so different? Because, writes Michael Burlingame, Lincoln wanted "to silence the legions of 'weak-nerved' voters who might object to the Emancipation Proclamation", which Lincoln would announce the following month. Yet Burlingame sees Lincoln's conduct in a more favorable light than does White: "Lincoln was stating an obvious truth: the Civil War was caused by the South's desire to maintain slavery and White supremacy at all costs. If no African Americans had been in the country, no fierce devotion to White supremacy would exist and hence no war would have occurred."

=== Letter to Greeley ===
On August 22, 1862, Lincoln published a letter in response to an editorial titled "The Prayer of Twenty Millions" by Horace Greeley of the New-York Tribune, in which the editor asked why Lincoln had not yet issued an emancipation proclamation, as he was authorized to do by the Second Confiscation Act. In his reply Lincoln differentiated between "my view of official duty"—that is, what he could do in his official capacity as President—and his personal views. Officially he must save the Union above all else; personally he wanted to free all the slaves:

I would save the Union. I would save it the shortest way under the Constitution. The sooner the national authority can be restored; the nearer the Union will be "the Union as it was." If there be those who would not save the Union, unless they could at the same time save slavery, I do not agree with them. If there be those who would not save the Union unless they could at the same time destroy slavery, I do not agree with them. My paramount object in this struggle is to save the Union, and is not either to save or to destroy slavery. If I could save the Union without freeing any slave I would do it, and if I could save it by freeing all the slaves I would do it; and if I could save it by freeing some and leaving others alone I would also do that. What I do about slavery, and the colored race, I do because I believe it helps to save the Union; and what I forbear, I forbear because I do not believe it would help to save the Union. I shall do less whenever I shall believe what I am doing hurts the cause, and I shall do more whenever I shall believe doing more will help the cause. I shall try to correct errors when shown to be errors; and I shall adopt new views so fast as they shall appear to be true views. I have here stated my purpose according to my view of official duty; and I intend no modification of my oft-expressed personal wish that all men everywhere could be free.

At the time that Lincoln published this letter, he seemingly had already chosen the third of the three options he named: He was waiting for a Union victory to issue the preliminary Emancipation Proclamation, which would announce that he would free some but not all the slaves on January 1, 1863. Nevertheless, "From mid-October to mid-November 1862, he sent personal envoys to Louisiana, Tennessee, and Arkansas. His envoys bore tidings" that "[i]f citizens desired 'to avoid the unsatisfactory' terms of the Final Emancipation Proclamation 'and to have peace again on the old terms' (i.e., with slavery intact), they should rally ... to vote in an 'election of members of the members of the Congress of the United States'...."

=== Emancipation Proclamation ===
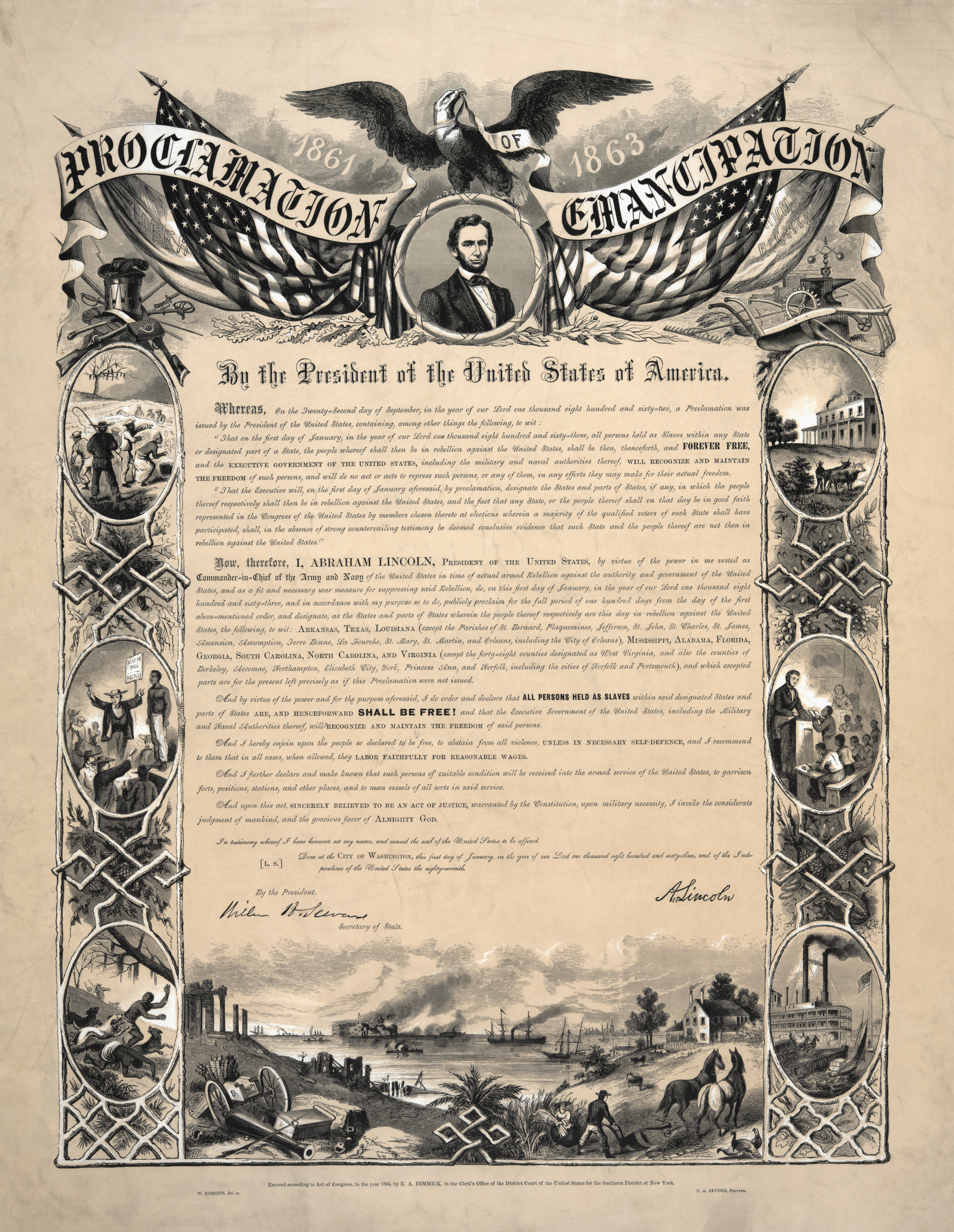
1864 Reproduction of Emancipation Proclamation

On September 22, 1862, exactly one month after writing the letter to Greeley, Lincoln issued his preliminary Emancipation Proclamation, which announced that, on January 1, 1863, he would, under his war powers, free all slaves in states still in rebellion. Lincoln scholar Harold Holzer wrote: "Unknown to Greeley, Lincoln composed this [the letter to Greeley] after he had already drafted a preliminary Emancipation Proclamation, which he had determined to issue after the next Union military victory. Therefore, this letter was, in truth, an attempt to position the impending announcement in terms of saving the Union, not freeing slaves as a humanitarian gesture. It was one of Lincoln's most skillful public relations efforts, even if it has cast longstanding doubt on his sincerity as a liberator." Historian Richard Striner argues that "for years" Lincoln's letter has been misread as "Lincoln only wanted to save the Union." However, within the context of Lincoln's entire career and pronouncements on slavery, this interpretation is wrong, according to Striner. Rather, Lincoln was softening the strong Northern white-supremacist opposition to his imminent emancipation order by tying it to the cause of the Union. This opposition would fight for the Union but not to end slavery, so Lincoln gave them the means and motivation to do both at the same time.

In his 2014 book, Lincoln's Gamble, journalist and historian Todd Brewster asserted that Lincoln's desire to reassert the saving of the Union as his sole war goal was in fact crucial to his claim of legal authority for emancipation. Since slavery was protected by the Constitution, the only way that he could free the slaves was as a tactic of war—not for its own sake. But that carried the risk that when the war ended, so would the justification for freeing the slaves. Late in 1862, Lincoln asked his Attorney General, Edward Bates, for an opinion as to whether slaves freed through a war-related proclamation of emancipation could be re-enslaved once the war was over. Bates had to work through the language of the Dred Scott decision to arrive at an answer, but he finally concluded that they could indeed remain free. Still, a complete end to slavery would require a constitutional amendment.

But a constitutional amendment has to be ratified by three-fourths of the states. There were too many slave states and not enough free states for a constitutional amendment to be ratified, so even as he was preparing to issue his Emancipation Proclamation he proposed a series of constitutional amendments that would make it easier for the federal government to pressure states to abolish slavery on their own, including compensation, a gradual timetable for abolition, and subsidies for blacks willing to colonize themselves outside the United States. None of those constitutional amendments came close to passage. But by 1863 Lincoln had other ways of pressuring the state to abolish slavery: By refusing to return slaves who escaped from loyal masters in loyal states, and by enlisting slaves from loyal states into the Union Army with the promise of emancipation, the Lincoln administration systematically undermined slavery in many of the Southern states.

Lincoln had begun pressuring the border states to abolish slavery in November 1861, with no success. In 1862 he began to warn the states that if they did not abolish slavery on their own, the institution would succumb to the "incidents of war" and would be undermined by "mere friction and abrasion". But the abrasion was no mere incident; it was the policy of emancipation. Beginning in mid-1863 Lincoln intensified the pressure on all the slave states, and in early 1864 the policy began to pay off. Between January 1864 and January 1865, three slave states abolished slavery, all under intense pressure from the federal government. By the time the House of Representatives sent the Thirteenth Amendment to the states for ratification, the ratio of free to slave states was 27:9, or the needed three-quarters.

=== West Virginia ===
Early in the war, several counties of Virginia that were loyal to the Union formed the Restored Government of Virginia and applied for statehood for part of western Virginia into the Union as a new state. Lincoln required West Virginia to have a constitutional plan for gradual emancipation as a condition of statehood. In response, West Virginia passed the Willey Amendment, which declared "The children of slaves born within the limits of this State after the fourth day of July, eighteen hundred and sixty-three, shall be free; and all slaves within this state who shall, at the time aforesaid, be under the age of ten years, shall be free when they arrive at the age of twenty-one years; and all slaves over ten and under twenty-one years shall be free when they arrive at the age of twenty-five years; and no slave shall be permitted to come into the State for permanent residence therein." Lincoln considered this satisfactory, writing, "the admission of the new state, turns that much slave soil to free; and thus, is a certain, and irrevocable encroachment upon the cause of the rebellion." West Virginia was granted statehood on June 20, 1863, and went on to fully abolish slavery on February 3, 1865, roughly three months before the end of the war.

=== Conkling letter ===
Lincoln came to appreciate the role that black troops played in this process. In the end some 180,000 blacks served in the Union Army, a disproportionate number of them from the states that ended up abolishing slavery. He made his feeling clear in an eloquent letter a year later to James C. Conkling on August 26, 1863.

The war has certainly progressed as favorably for us, since the issue of proclamation as before. I know as fully as one can know the opinions of others, that some of the commanders of our armies in the field who have given us our most important successes, believe the emancipation policy, and the use of the colored troops, constitute the heaviest blow yet dealt to the rebellion; and that, at least one of those important successes, could not have been achieved when it was, but for the aid of black soldiers. Among the commanders holding these views are some who have never had any affinity with what is called abolitionism, or with republican party politics; but who hold them purely as military opinions. I submit these opinions as being entitled to some weight against the objections, often urged, that emancipation, and arming the blacks, are unwise as military measures, and were not adopted, as such, in good faith.

You say you will not fight to free negroes. Some of them seem willing to fight for you; but, no matter. Fight you, then, exclusively to save the Union. I issued the proclamation on purpose to aid you in saving the Union. Whenever you shall have conquered all resistance to the Union, if I shall urge you to continue fighting, it will be an apt time, then, for you to declare you will not fight to free negroes.

I thought that in your struggle for the Union, to whatever extent the negroes should cease helping the enemy, to that extent it weakened the enemy in his resistance to you. Do you think differently? I thought that whatever negroes can be got to do as soldiers, leaves just so much less for white soldiers to do, in saving the Union. Does it appear otherwise to you? But negroes, like other people, act upon motives. Why should they do any thing for us, if we will do nothing for them? If they stake their lives for us, they must be prompted by the strongest motive—even the promise of freedom. And the promise being made, must be kept.... [When peace comes], there will be some black men who can remember that, with silent tongue, and clenched teeth, and steady eye, and well-poised bayonet, they have helped mankind on to this great consummation; while, I fear, there will be some white ones, unable to forget that, with malignant heart, and deceitful speech, they strove to hinder it.

The Conkling letter was dated August 26, 1863, the month after two great Union victories at Gettysburg and Vicksburg, but also at a time when Americans were reading the first reports of black troops fighting courageously in battles at Milliken's Bend and Battery Wagner. It was also in the summer of 1863 that Lincoln initiated his intensified effort to get various slave states to abolish slavery on their own.

Lincoln addresses the changes to his positions and actions regarding emancipation in an 1864 letter to Albert G. Hodges. In that letter, Lincoln states his moral opposition to slavery, writing, "I am naturally anti-slavery. If slavery is not wrong, nothing is wrong. I can not remember when I did not so think, and feel. And yet I have never understood that the Presidency conferred upon me an unrestricted right to act officially upon this judgment and feeling." Lincoln further explained that he had eventually determined that military emancipation and the enlistment of black soldiers were necessary for the preservation of the Union, which was his responsibility as president.

Having won re-election to the presidency in November 1864 on a platform of abolishing slavery, Lincoln and several members of his cabinet embarked on a sustained lobbying effort to get the abolition amendment through the House of Representatives. The amendment abolishing slavery everywhere in the United States was ratified by every state that had abolished slavery during the war, and it became part of the Constitution on December 6, 1865.

=== Reconstruction ===
On December 8, 1863, Lincoln used his war powers to issue a "Proclamation for Amnesty and Reconstruction", which offered Southern states a chance to peacefully rejoin the Union if they abolished slavery and collected loyalty oaths from 10 percent of their voting population. Before the end of the war, Louisiana. Arkansas, Maryland, Missouri, Tennessee, and West Virginia, abolished slavery. In addition, the Union loyalist, Restored government of Virginia, abolished slavery before the end of the war.

On June 28, 1864, President Lincoln signed into law Congress's repeal of the Fugitive Slave Act of 1850.

As Lincoln began to be concerned about the 1864 presidential election and the potential for a new administration that would end the war without emancipation, he turned to Frederick Douglass. He said, according to Douglass, "I want you to set about devising some means of making them [slaves] acquainted with it [the Emancipation Proclamation], and for bringing them into our lines," thereby making emancipation an accomplished fact before a potential next administration could take office.

=== Thirteenth Amendment ===
When Lincoln accepted the nomination for the Union party for president in June 1864, he called for the first time for the passage of the Thirteenth Amendment to the United States Constitution, to immediately abolish slavery and involuntary servitude, except as punishment for a crime. He wrote in his letter of acceptance that "it would make a fitting and necessary conclusion" to the war and would permanently join the causes of "Liberty and Union." He won re-election on this platform in November, and in December, 1864, Lincoln worked to have the House approve the amendment.

When the House passed the 13th Amendment on January 31, 1865, Lincoln signed it, even though this was not required, because the president plays no role in amending the Constitution. He said in a speech the next day, "He thought all would bear him witness that he had never shrunk from doing all that he could to eradicate Slavery by issuing an emancipation proclamation." He pointed out that the Emancipation Proclamation did not complete the task of eradicating slavery, "But this amendment is a King's cure for all the evils [of slavery]."

=== Second inaugural address ===
Lincoln, having gotten the constitutional amendment to abolish slavery through Congress, began his second term. He discussed slavery throughout his second inaugural address, describing it as not only the cause of the Civil War, but claiming that, as an offense to God, it drew God's righteous judgment against the entire nation.

One eighth of the whole population were colored slaves, not distributed generally over the Union, but localized in the Southern part of it. These slaves constituted a peculiar and powerful interest. All knew that this interest was, somehow, the cause of the war.... It may seem strange that any men should dare to ask a just God's assistance in wringing their bread from the sweat of other men's faces; but let us judge not that we be not judged.... The Almighty has His own purposes. "Woe unto the world because of offences! for it must needs be that offences come; but woe to that man by whom the offence cometh!" [ Matthew 18:7 ] If we shall suppose that American Slavery is one of those offences which, in the providence of God, must needs come, but which, having continued through His appointed time, He now wills to remove, and that He gives to both North and South, this terrible war, as the woe due to those by whom the offence came.... Fondly do we hope — fervently do we pray — that this mighty scourge of war may speedily pass away. Yet, if God wills that it continue, until all the wealth piled by the bond-man's two hundred and fifty years of unrequited toil shall be sunk, and until every drop of blood drawn with the lash, shall be paid by another drawn with the sword, as was said three thousand years ago, so still it must be said "the judgments of the Lord, are true and righteous altogether." [ Psalms 19:9 ]

=== Compensated emancipation: Buy out the slave owners ===
The Thirteenth Amendment, which abolished slavery, provided no compensation to slave owners, but previously, President Lincoln had made numerous proposals to the loyal border states to agree to "compensated emancipation." None did. The only area of the country that would ever receive compensated emancipation would be Washington, D.C. Because Washington, D.C., was under federal jurisdiction, Congress was able pass the District of Columbia Compensated Emancipation Act.

President Lincoln advocated that slave owners be compensated for emancipated slaves. On March 6, 1862, President Lincoln, in a message to the U.S. Congress, proposed that Congress adopt a Joint Resolution stating that "any state which may adopt gradual abolishment of slavery" should be given "pecuniary aid ... to compensate for the inconveniences public and private, produced by such a change of system". Congress adopted the resolution. On July 12, 1862, President Lincoln, in a conference with congressmen from the four border states of Kentucky, Maryland, Delaware, and Missouri, urged that their respective states adopt emancipation legislation that compensated slave owners. On July 14, 1862, President Lincoln sent a bill to Congress that would have allowed the Treasury to issue bonds at 6% interest to states for slave emancipation compensation to slave owners. The bill never came to a vote.

In the Preliminary Emancipation Proclamation, issued on September 22, 1862, Lincoln stated, "That it is my purpose, upon the next meeting of Congress to again recommend ... tendering pecuniary aid to the free acceptance of all slave-states, so called, the people whereof may not then be in rebellion against the United States, and which states, may then have voluntarily adopted, or thereafter may voluntarily adopt, immediate, or gradual abolishment of slavery...."

In his December 1, 1862, Annual Message to Congress, Lincoln proposed a constitutional amendment that would provide federal compensation, in the form of interest-bearing U.S. bonds, to any state that voluntarily abolished slavery before the year 1900. It also provided, "Any State having received bonds ... and afterwards reintroducing or tolerating slavery therein, shall refund to the United States the bonds so received, or the value thereof, and all interest paid thereon." Giving the states the option to reintroduce slavery meant that Lincoln was offering to end the war without slavery ever permanently ending.

As late as the Hampton Roads Conference in 1865, Lincoln met with Confederate leaders and proposed a "fair indemnity," possibly $500,000,000, in compensation for emancipated slaves.

=== Colonization ===
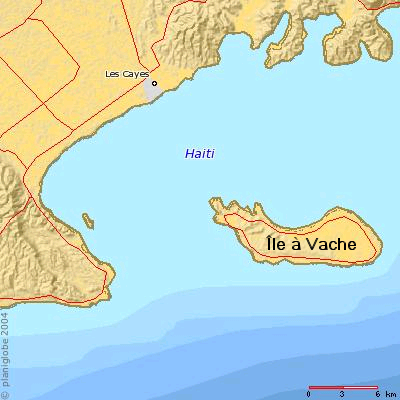
One of several failed colonization attempts during Lincoln's presidency was on the Île à Vache, off the coast of Haiti.

According to Michael Lind, Lincoln was for most of his life a moderate Northern mainstream white supremacist and proponent of black colonization abroad in Panama, Haiti, and Liberia. An ardent follower of Henry Clay, he envisioned an all-white United States without slavery. Leading Lincoln scholars, however, do not see Lincoln as a white supremacist and view his support for voluntary colonization as intended in part to make emancipation more palatable to racist white people. Eric Foner, however, writes, "One problem with this explanation is that Lincoln's advocacy of colonization predated not only his presidency but his emergence as an antislavery politician". Foner also writes, "For many white Americans, including Lincoln, colonization represented a middle ground between the radicalism of the abolitionists and the prospect of the United States existing permanently half-slave and half-free".

Other historians have also disagreed about Lincoln's motivation for supporting colonization, with scholars such as James McPherson, David Reynolds, and Allen Guelzo arguing that Lincoln advocated colonization of the freedpeople in order to assuage racist concerns about the Emancipation Proclamation, while historians such as Phillip W. Magness, Richard Blackett, Phillip Paludan, and Mark E. Neely, Jr., have challenged that contention by highlighting the quiet, even secretive basis of most of Lincoln's colonization activity; the lack of falsifiability to any unsubstantiated claim that historical actors did not mean what they said; and the inadequacy, for a deportationist target audience, of Lincoln's adherence to African American consent. The author of the one book-length study of black colonization during the Civil War era, Sebastian N. Page, argues that Lincoln believed in colonization to his death, but that the policy failed due to the corruption, controversy, and the inadequate African American interest that it generated.

==== Antebellum activity (to 1861) ====
Probably present at the 1845 founding of a short-lived Illinois auxiliary to the American Colonization Society (ACS), Lincoln had helped transfer a donation to the latter during his residency in Washington, D.C., as a member of the Thirtieth Congress. In 1852, he made his first recorded remarks on African American resettlement in a eulogy for the president of the ACS, Henry Clay. The next year, he helped an Indiana colonizationist, James Mitchell, who had come to Springfield, Illinois, to rekindle that state's colonization movement. In 1854, in his Peoria speech, Lincoln articulated two motifs of his support for colonization: first, the unwillingness of "the great mass of white people" to accept black equality, and second, on a note of qualification, Liberia's liability to be overwhelmed by any sizable influx of immigrants. Accordingly, he supported the colonization program of Francis Preston Blair and his sons Frank and Montgomery (until 1860, better-known Republicans than Lincoln), who rejected Liberia in favor of closer destinations in the American tropics.

==== Wartime provisions (1861–1862) ====
In his first annual message to Congress (now known as the State of the Union Address), of December 3, 1861, Lincoln advised Congress to provide for the colonization of free African American people, even if it required the United States to acquire further territory. He encouraged the Thirty-Seventh Congress's insertion of voluntary colonization clauses into its District Emancipation and Second Confiscation Acts, intimating that he would not sign those bills unless they contained such a provision. Once Congress had passed this legislation, which it reinforced with a $600,000 fund for colonization, Lincoln appointed his old collaborator, James Mitchell, as his colonization agent within the Department of the Interior. Together, they arranged his famous meeting of August 14, 1862, with a deputation of black Washingtonians on whom he urged colonization.

During a series of three cabinet meetings of late September 1862, Lincoln rebuffed Attorney General Edward Bates's suggestion of compulsory colonization, but decided to ask Congress, in his second annual message of December 1, 1862, to pass an amendment to the U.S. Constitution to promote black resettlement by treaty with putative host states. Legislators' lack of response drove Lincoln thereafter to his own public silence on colonization, though he quietly continued to pursue colonization schemes, and in two waves.

==== First-wave schemes: "Contract colonies" in Latin America (1861–1864) ====
The president's two best-known colonization projects, Linconia (in Chiriquí Province, today in Panama) and the Île-à-Vache (Haiti), would both fail, albeit at different stages of their development, because of Lincoln's initial proclivity for pursuing colonization through U.S.-based concessionaires rather than the sovereign states that had granted them their leases.

For over a year from October 1861, Lincoln hoped to found a black colony in the Chiriquí district of what is now Panama, then an outlying part of Colombia. The settlers would mine coal to supply the U.S. Navy, and might even secure isthmian transit from the Atlantic to the Pacific. The president appointed the U.S. senator for Kansas, Samuel Pomeroy, to lead the expedition and choose pioneers from the 13,700 African Americans who applied to join him. Lincoln also signed a contract with Ambrose W. Thompson, the leaseholder of the tract in question, which allowed for tens of thousands of African Americans to immigrate. The secretary of the interior, Caleb B. Smith, also issued Pomeroy $25,000 from the colonization fund, to pay for transportation and equipment.

Lincoln suspended the project in early October 1862, before a single ship had sailed, ostensibly because of diplomatic protests by the governments of Central America, but really because of the uncertainty caused by the Colombian Civil War. The president hoped to overcome these complications by having Congress provide for a treaty with Colombia for African American emigration, much as he outlined in his second annual message, but he shelved the Chiriquí project over the New Year of 1863 when he learned that its stakeholders included not only a personal friend, Richard W. Thompson, but also the new secretary of the interior, John P. Usher.

By way of substitute, on New Year's Eve, 1862, Lincoln arranged with a New Orleans businessman, Bernard Kock, to establish a colony on the Île-à-Vache, an island off Haiti. Although the White House subsequently remade the agreement with more trustworthy partners than Kock, the new contractors retained Kock as the supervisor of the settlement, for which more than 400 freed slaves sailed from Fort Monroe, Virginia. Lack of shelter on the island, an outbreak of smallpox, and an ever-growing mistrust between the administration and its contractors doomed the colony. In February 1864, at Lincoln's behest, Secretary of War Edwin Stanton dispatched a vessel to rescue the survivors.

==== Second-wave schemes: Emigration to the European West Indies (1862–1864) ====
A critic of the "contract colonies," the commissioner of emigration, James Mitchell, encouraged Abraham Lincoln to promote African American emigration to British Honduras (Belize) and the British West Indies at large. Separately, the U.S. minister to the Netherlands, James Shepherd Pike, negotiated a treaty for black resettlement in the Dutch West Indies (Suriname). Lincoln believed that by dealing with the comparatively stable European empires, he could avoid some of the problems that had plagued his earlier contracts with private interests.

Lincoln signed an agreement on June 13, 1863, with John Hodge of British Honduras, which authorized colonial agents to recruit ex-slaves and transport them to Belize from the approved ports of Philadelphia, New York City, and Boston. Later that year the Department of the Interior sent John Willis Menard, a free African American clerk who supported colonization, to investigate the site for the government. The scheme petered out when John Usher refused to release funds to the would-be pioneers of Henry Highland Garnet's African Civilization Society and when the British Colonial Office banned the recruitment of "contraband" freedpeople for fear that the Confederacy would deem this a hostile act.

==== Final disposition of colonization (1864–1865) ====
The question of when Lincoln abandoned colonization, if ever, has aroused debate among historians. The government funded no more colonies after the rescue of the Ile à Vache survivors in early 1864, and Congress repealed most of the colonization funding that July.

Lincoln left no surviving statements in his own hand on the subject during the last two years of his presidency. An entry in the diary of presidential secretary John Hay, dated July 1, 1864, claims that Lincoln had "sloughed off" colonization, though attributes that change to the president's frustration with corrupt contractors rather than to any philosophical departure. In the fall of 1864, Lincoln wrote Attorney General Edward Bates to inquire whether the legislation of 1862 allowed him to continue pursuing colonization and to retain Mitchell's services irrespective of the loss of funding. General Benjamin F. Butler claimed that Lincoln approached him in 1865, a few days before his assassination, to talk about reviving colonization in Panama. Since the mid-twentieth century, historians have debated the validity of Butler's account, as Butler wrote it years after the fact and was prone to exaggerating his prowess as a general. Recently discovered documents prove that Butler and Lincoln did indeed meet on April 11, 1865, though whether and to what extent they talked about colonization is not recorded except in Butler's account.

A postwar article by Secretary of the Navy Gideon Welles suggested that Lincoln intended to revive colonization in his second term.

=== Citizenship and limited suffrage ===
In his second term as president, on April 11, 1865, Lincoln gave his last public speech. In it, for the first time publicly, he promoted voting rights for some blacks, stating "It is also unsatisfactory to some that the elective franchise is not given to the colored man. I would myself prefer that it were now conferred on the very intelligent, and on those who serve our cause as soldiers." John Wilkes Booth, a Southerner and outspoken Confederate sympathizer, attended the speech and became determined to kill Lincoln for supporting citizenship for blacks. Booth assassinated Lincoln three days later.

In analyzing Lincoln's position historian Eugene H. Berwanger notes:

During his presidency, Lincoln took a reasoned course which helped the federal government both destroy slavery and advance the cause of black suffrage. For a man who had denied both reforms four years earlier, Lincoln's change in attitude was rapid and decisive. He was both open-minded and perceptive to the needs of his nation in a postwar era. Once committed to a principle, Lincoln moved toward it with steady, determined progress.

== Views on African Americans ==
Known as the Great Emancipator, Lincoln was a complicated figure who wrestled with his own views on race. Through changing times, successive generations have interpreted Lincoln's views on African Americans differently. According to Henry Louis Gates Jr., "To apply 20th century beliefs and standards to an America of 1858 and declare Abraham Lincoln a 'racist' is a faulty formula that unfairly distorts Lincoln's true role in advancing civil and human rights. By the standards of his time, Lincoln's views on race and equality were progressive and truly changed minds, policy and most importantly, hearts for years to come."

Lincoln's primary audience was white (male) voters. Lincoln's views on slavery, race equality, and African-American colonization are often intermixed. During the 1858 debates with Stephen Douglas, Lincoln stated that the "physical difference between the white and black races ... will forever forbid the two races living together on terms of social and political equality". He added that "there must be the position of superior and inferior, and I, as much as any other man, am in favor of having the superior position assigned to the white race."

While president, as the Civil War progressed, Lincoln advocated and implemented anti-slavery policies, including the Emancipation Proclamation and limited suffrage for African Americans, which he had earlier opposed. Former slave and leading abolitionist Frederick Douglass unequivocally regarded Lincoln as sharing "the prejudices of his white fellow-countrymen against the Negro", but also observed of Lincoln that "in his company, I was never reminded of my humble origin, or of my unpopular color." According to Douglass, Lincoln "was preeminently the white man's President" and also, "emphatically the black man's President: the first to show any respect to their rights as men".

Douglass attested to Lincoln's genuine respect for him and other blacks, and to the wisdom of Lincoln's course of action in obtaining both the preservation of the Union (his sworn duty as president) and the freeing of the slaves. In an 1876 speech at the unveiling of the Freedmen's Monument in Memory of Abraham Lincoln (later renamed the Emancipation Memorial), he defended Lincoln's actions:

His great mission was to accomplish two things: first, to save his country from dismemberment and ruin; and, second, to free his country from the great crime of slavery. To do one or the other, or both, he must have the earnest sympathy and the powerful cooperation of his loyal fellow-countrymen. Without this primary and essential condition to success his efforts must have been vain and utterly fruitless. Had he put the abolition of slavery before the salvation of the Union, he would have inevitably driven from him a powerful class of the American people and rendered resistance to rebellion impossible.

Viewed from the genuine abolition ground, Mr. Lincoln seemed tardy, cold, dull, and indifferent; but measuring him by the sentiment of his country, a sentiment he was bound as a statesman to consult, he was swift, zealous, radical, and determined....

[T]aking him for all in all, measuring the tremendous magnitude of the work before him, considering the necessary means to ends, and surveying the end from the beginning, infinite wisdom has seldom sent any man into the world better fitted for his mission than Abraham Lincoln.

In his past, Lincoln lived in a middle-class, racially mixed neighborhood of Springfield, Illinois; one of his long-time neighbors, Jameson Jenkins (who may have been born a slave), had come from North Carolina and was publicly implicated in the 1850s as a Springfield conductor on the Underground Railroad, sheltering fugitive slaves. In 1861, President-elect Lincoln called on Jenkins to give him a ride to the train depot, where Lincoln delivered his farewell address before leaving Springfield for the last time. Accompanying Lincoln to Washington was a free African American, William Johnson, who acted during the trip as valet, messenger, and bodyguard. Johnson was afterward employed by the White House and then as messenger in the Treasury Department. The two men called on each other for favors. When Johnson contracted fever, probably from Lincoln, and died in 1864, Lincoln satisfied Johnson's family debts and paid for his burial and tombstone in Arlington.

When Lincoln arrived at the White House, for the first time in his life he lived within a large community of free African Americans employed there. Many had previously been enslaved or were descendants of slaves, and their success as free people may have influenced Lincoln's own thinking. Lincoln is said to have shown these employees "a peculiar care and solicitude," and it was noted, perhaps surprisingly, that Lincoln treated them "like people". "He 'sympathized with us colored folks,' one former servant said, 'and we loved him.'" White House usher William Slade, who became an "intimate friend," was often the first person Lincoln asked to review parts of his writings and speeches, likely including drafts of the Emancipation Proclamation.

== See also ==
- Lincoln's Lost Speech
- George Washington and slavery
- Thomas Jefferson and slavery
- John Quincy Adams and abolitionism
- Timeline of the civil rights movement
