= The Century: America's Time =

Television series

The Century: America's Time is a 15-part television series of documentaries produced by ABC News about the 20th century and the rise of the United States as a superpower. The documentary originally aired on The History Channel in 1999. Peter Jennings, anchor of ABC World News Tonight narrates the series.

Along with distinguished journalist Todd Brewster, Jennings co-authored a book titled The Century which became a national bestseller. This series is part of the History Channel's "Cable in The Classroom" curriculum and the study guides for each episode can be found on their website, under the letter "C".

ABC ran a mini-marathon of the series on September 15, 2001, in reaction to the September 11 attacks. The marathon signaled the transition from 24/7 news coverage, which had gone uninterrupted since the first reports of an incident at the World Trade Center, back to "normal" programming.

== Episodes ==
No.	Title	Original release date
1	"The Beginning: Seeds of Change"	April 12, 1999
How did the 20th century change the ways Americans live? This program examines the early 1900s – when William McKinley was President, a loaf of bread cost only a few cents, horsepower really meant horsepower, flying to the moon was the stuff of dreams, and the average life span was only 45 years – while looking ahead to the decades of changes yet to come.
2	"1914–1919 Shell Shock"	April 12, 1999
The psychological damage inflicted by the stupifying bombardments of World War I was called shell shock, a term that aptly described the feeling of the post-war world. This program illustrates America's reluctant emergence as a world power and analyzes the impact of the wholesale sense of loss – of life, of husbands and fathers, and of sacred ideals such as honor, patriotism, and glory – that sprang from "the war to end all wars."
3	"1920–1929 Boom to Bust"	April 13, 1999
In the aftermath of World War I, many modern-minded Americans, particularly women, were eager to do away with outdated traditions and claim new rights and freedoms. This program investigates why the issue of women's rights, ranging from suffrage to smoking, became so controversial – and what that said about America's sense of self.
4	"1929–1936 Stormy Weather"	April 14, 1999
America – a nation that claimed ever-increasing wealth as a birthright – was rudely awakened by the Great Depression, which caused 25 percent unemployment, the closing of 9,000 banks, and the loss of $2.5 billion in deposits. This program captures a people's struggle as they faced the collapse of prosperity and diminished hope of being able to experience the American Dream.
5	"1936–1941 Over the Edge"	April 15, 1999
Safely watching Europe from across the Atlantic Ocean, many Americans observed the messianic popularity of Hitler and Mussolini and the subsequent outbreak of World War II with concern and dismay. This program explores the crucial question: could the United States resist involvement, or would American forces be sent to fight in another European war?
6	"1941–1945 Civilians at War (2 Parts)"	April 16, 1999
World War II was the first war in history that killed more civilians than soldiers, as leaders on both sides accepted noncombatant casualties as inevitable – and, to some, even desirable. This program studies the courage and the strength necessary to face and survive starvation, bombing, torpedoing, massacre, and extermination in camps specifically designed for that purpose.
7	"1941–1945 Homefront"	April 19, 1999
The shock of Pearl Harbor awoke America from its dream of isolationism. As troops went overseas and industry ramped up to supply the urgent need for war materials, a new wave of Southern blacks migrated north and west to fill the workforce – along with millions of women, who exchanged housework for war work. This program discusses the effects of World War II on the home front, spotlighting the war's impact as a catalyst for economic, demographic, and social change.
8	"1946–1952 Best Years"	April 20, 1999
Demobilization after World War II meant difficult changes as the U.S., geared up for war, resumed a peacetime existence. This program describes America's new status as a superpower, as the nation shouldered the responsibility for rebuilding Europe and Japan – and for containing Soviet ambitions. The challenge faced by veterans and spouses to become reacquainted after years of separation and hardship is highlighted.
9	"1953–1960 Happy Days"	April 21, 1999
The post-war baby boom, suburban living, Marilyn Monroe, and Elvis epitomizes the contentment of the Eisenhower years. But these were also years marked by rabid McCarthyism, violent civil rights demonstrations, and a frightening escalation in the Cold War. This program probes the tension between these crosscurrents in American history.
10	"1960–1964 Poisoned Dreams"	April 22, 1999
Beset by both international and domestic pressures, America during the Camelot years was swiftly approaching a political-cultural meltdown. This program documents U.S. – Soviet conflicts of interest in Cuba and Vietnam and the growing polarization at home between civil rights activists and segregationist hard-liners, which resulted in the Birmingham riots and the freedom march on Washington.
11	"1965–1970 Unpinned"	April 23, 1999
Riots and protests intensified in the U.S. as the war in Vietnam dragged on, with anti-war and civil rights activists seeking violent ways to agitate for peace and equality. This program presents the unrelenting rage that divided the nation during those perilous years, as the Watts race riots, the assassination of Martin Luther King Jr. and Robert F. Kennedy, and the Kent State killings made Headline news.
12	"1971–1975 Approaching the Apocalypse"	April 26, 1999
The trauma of the war in Vietnam and the Watergate scandal left Americans exhausted, embittered, and disillusioned with politics and politicians. This program appraises the effects of those blights on the political landscape and their impact on the trust between the government and the governed, so vital to the well-being of a representative democracy such as the United States.
13	"1976–1980 Starting Over"	April 27, 1999
The women's and civil rights movements, begun decades earlier and as controversial as ever, continue to evolve during the nation's Bicentennial period. This program focuses on the changing momentum of feminism, hampered by its failure to secure broad ratification of the Equal Rights Amendment, and the heated confrontations that arose over affirmative action and busing.
14	"1981–1989 A New World"	April 28, 1999
The Reagan era witnessed the unexpected end of the Cold War and a welcome return to a booming domestic economy – but did events unfold too quickly to control? This program takes a look at the details and the aftershocks both of the dissolution of the Soviet Union and the yuppie capitalism that threatened to push the limits of the American economy too far.
15	"1990–1999 Then and Now"	April 29, 1999
Fifty years into the future, how will computer and communications technology reshape the way Americans work and play? What will be the benefits and consequences of biotechnology? Will the third-world nations dominate headline news? This program examines key moments of the ‘90s, reflects on changes during the last five decades, and, with the assistance of leading futurists, looks ahead to some of the possible events and innovations just over the horizon.

== See also ==
- Peter Jennings
- Todd Brewster
- The Century for Young People
- Lincoln's Gamble
- American Broadcasting Company
- The History Channel
