= Mount Zion, Georgia =

City in Georgia, United States

- City
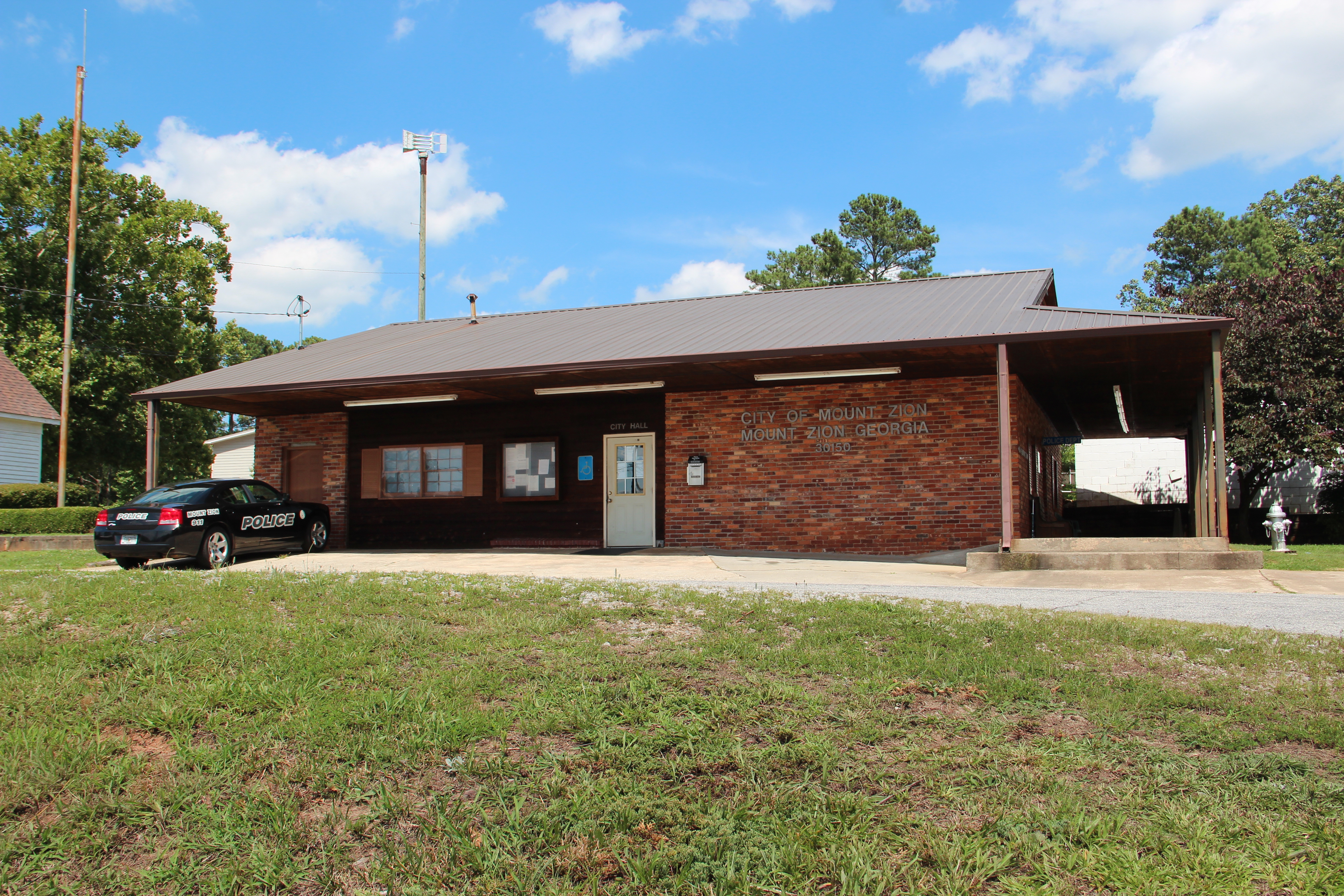
- Mount Zion City Hall

- Flag

- Location in Carroll County and the state of Georgia
- Coordinates: 33°37′52″N 85°10′48″W
- Country: United States
- State: Georgia
- County: Carroll

Area
  - Total: 9.81 sq mi (25.41 km^{2})
  - Land: 9.71 sq mi (25.14 km^{2})
  - Water: 0.10 sq mi (0.27 km^{2})
- Elevation: 1,201 ft (366 m)

Population (2020)
  - Total: 1,766
  - Density: 181.9/sq mi (70.25/km^{2})
- Time zone: UTC-5 (Eastern (EST))
  - Summer (DST): UTC-4 (EDT)
- ZIP code: 30150
- Area code: 770
- FIPS code: 13-53620
- GNIS feature ID: 0332438
- Website: www.cityofmountzion.com

Mount Zion is a city in Carroll County, Georgia, United States. As of the 2020 census, Mount Zion had a population of 1,766.

== History ==
The City of Mount Zion was established in 1852 by Reverend Thomas Hicks Martin (March 10, 1822 - June 14, 1914), after his family had settled on land that had once been owned by the Creek Confederacy. It became known as Turkey Creek Mills, the name derived from a large wild turkey population found in the area. The city's name was later adopted from the local Mount Zion Methodist Episcopal Church, established 1865, which had soon become the center point of the community, and in 1878 the name Turkey Creek Mills was changed to Mount Zion.

In 1877, Reverend James Mitchell took his ministry to Mount Zion and founded the Mount Zion Seminary, the predecessor institution of the current Mount Zion High School.

The Georgia General Assembly incorporated Mount Zion as a town in 1912 and re-chartered in 1953 and again in 1978.

Mount Zion is one of the few places in the United States with the Confederate battle flag incorporated in its municipal flag, which is based on the 1956 Georgia state flag and inspired by the Trenton, Georgia city flag that began flying in 2002. The Mount Zion city flag began flying April 10, 2007.

== Geography ==
Mount Zion is located in northern Carroll County at 33°37′52″N 85°10′48″W (33.631113, -85.179868). It is 8 miles (13 km) northwest of Carrollton, the county seat, and 5 miles (8 km) southwest of Interstate 20 in Bremen. John Tanner Park is just south of the city limits off of Highway 16.

According to the United States Census Bureau, Mount Zion has a total area of 9.8 square miles (25.5 km^{2}), of which 9.7 square miles (25.1 km^{2}) is land and 0.15 square miles (0.4 km^{2}), or 1.71%, is water.

== Demographics ==
Historical population
Census	Pop.	Note	%±
1920	131		—
1930	121		−7.6%
1940	84		−30.6%
1950	141		67.9%
1960	211		49.6%
1970	264		25.1%
1980	445		68.6%
1990	511		14.8%
2000	1,275		149.5%
2010	1,696		33.0%
2020	1,766		4.1%
2023 (est.)	2,022	▲	14.5%
U.S. Decennial Census

=== 2020 census ===
As of the 2020 census, Mount Zion had a population of 1,766. The median age was 35.9 years. 26.6% of residents were under the age of 18 and 14.3% of residents were 65 years of age or older. For every 100 females there were 98.9 males, and for every 100 females age 18 and over there were 93.0 males age 18 and over.

0.0% of residents lived in urban areas, while 100.0% lived in rural areas.

There were 596 households in Mount Zion, of which 45.6% had children under the age of 18 living in them. Of all households, 53.9% were married-couple households, 14.4% were households with a male householder and no spouse or partner present, and 25.2% were households with a female householder and no spouse or partner present. About 18.8% of all households were made up of individuals and 6.4% had someone living alone who was 65 years of age or older.

There were 626 housing units, of which 4.8% were vacant. The homeowner vacancy rate was 0.5% and the rental vacancy rate was 4.9%.

Racial composition as of the 2020 census
Race	Number	Percent
White	1,554	88.0%
Black or African American	81	4.6%
American Indian and Alaska Native	7	0.4%
Asian	10	0.6%
Native Hawaiian and Other Pacific Islander	0	0.0%
Some other race	39	2.2%
Two or more races	75	4.2%
Hispanic or Latino (of any race)	86	4.9%

=== 2000 census ===
As of the census of 2000, there were 1,275 people, 434 households, and 351 families residing in the city. The population density was 130.7 inhabitants per square mile (50.5/km^{2}). There were 467 housing units at an average density of 47.9 per square mile (18.5/km^{2}). The racial makeup of the city was 94.12% White, 3.76% African American, 0.24% Native American, 0.94% Asian, 0.24% from other races, and 0.71% from two or more races. Hispanic or Latino of any race were 0.31% of the population.

There were 434 households, out of which 44.5% had children under the age of 18 living with them, 63.6% were married couples living together, 13.1% had a female householder with no husband present, and 18.9% were non-families. 15.7% of all households were made up of individuals, and 6.5% had someone living alone who was 65 years of age or older. The average household size was 2.94 and the average family size was 3.27.

In the city, the population was spread out, with 31.3% under the age of 18, 8.2% from 18 to 24, 34.4% from 25 to 44, 19.3% from 45 to 64, and 6.8% who were 65 years of age or older. The median age was 31 years. For every 100 females, there were 107.0 males. For every 100 females age 18 and over, there were 96.9 males.

The median income for a household in the city was $41,912, and the median income for a family was $43,438. Males had a median income of $31,959 versus $20,662 for females. The per capita income for the city was $16,080. About 11.8% of families and 12.9% of the population were below the poverty line, including 15.8% of those under age 18 and 22.6% of those age 65 or over.

== Notable people ==
- Walter Terry Colquitt, Methodist preacher, United States Representative and Senator from Georgia
- James Mitchell, U.S. Commissioner of negro colonization for President Abraham Lincoln
