= John Tanner Park =

Park in Georgia, United States

- IUCN category V (protected landscape/seascape)
- Interactive map of John Tanner Park
- Location: Carroll County, Georgia, U.S.
- Nearest city: Carrollton, Mount Zion
- Coordinates: 33°36′08″N 85°10′04″W
- Area: 138 acres (56 ha)
- Operator: Carroll County
- Website: carrollcountyga.com/Facilities/Facility/Details/John-Tanner-Park-1

John Tanner Park, formerly known as John Tanner State Park, is a 138 acres (56 ha) Carroll County park located between Carrollton and Mount Zion. The park is named after John Tanner, a local businessman who operated the park from 1954 to 1971. He operated it as Tanner's Beach. The park itself is well known for its water-friendly recreation. It contains two lakes, one 12 acres (4.9 ha) and the other 16 acres (6.5 ha), and the largest sand beach of any Georgia state park. There is also a walking and nature trail for land-dwellers. It became managed by Carroll County in 2010 and was purchased by Carroll County in 2013.

== Facilities ==
- 32 Tent/Trailer/RV Sites
- 4 Picnic Shelters
- 2 Group Shelters
- Pioneer Camping
- Group Lodge
- Motor Lodge
- Miniature Golf Course

== Events ==
Junior Sportsman Bonanza in March.

Halloween Heyday in October.

A Very Carroll Christmas in December.
