= Abraham Lincoln's Peoria speech =

1854 speech by Abraham Lincoln

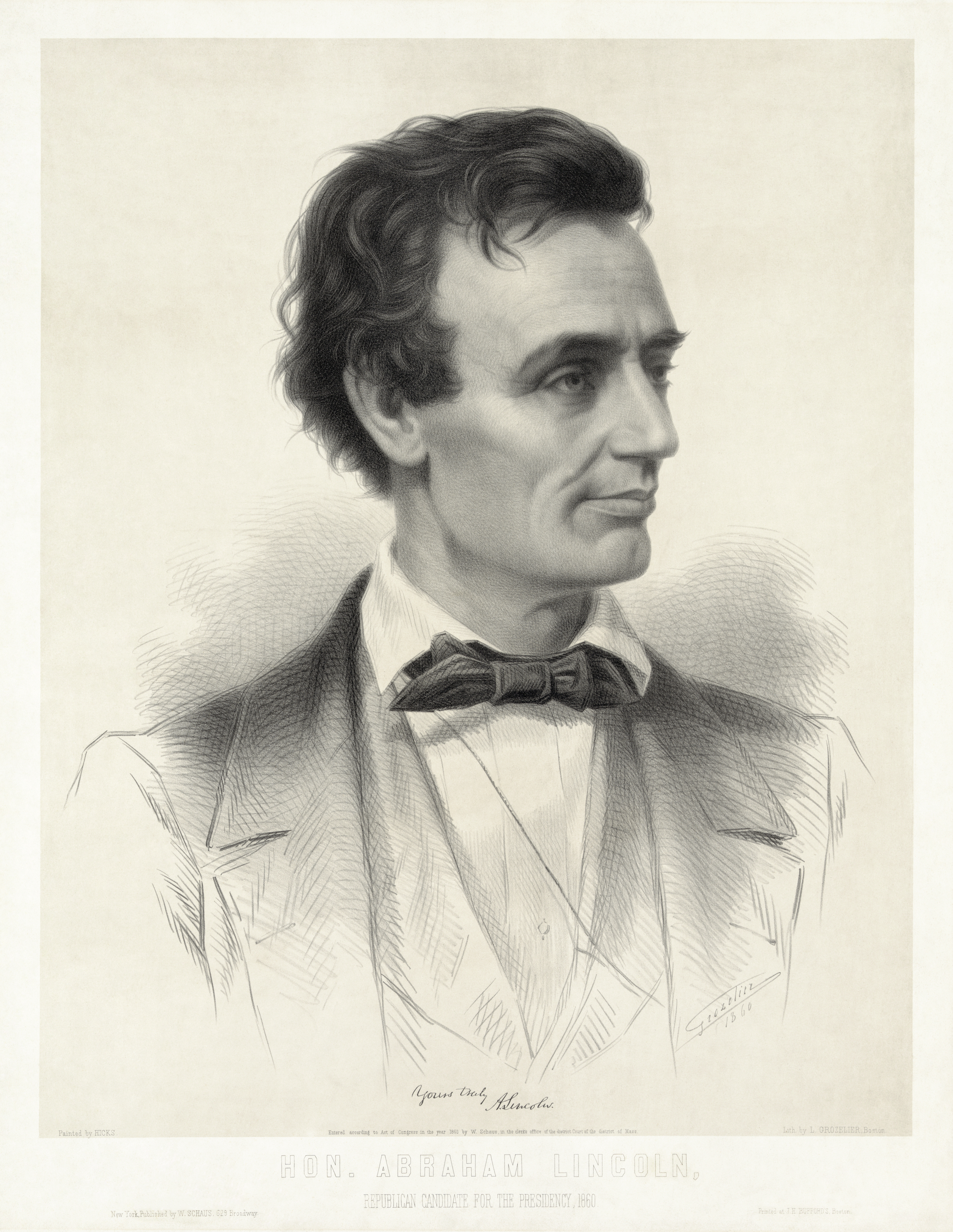
An 1860 lithograph of a young Lincoln

Abraham Lincoln's Peoria speech was made in Peoria, Illinois on October 16, 1854. The speech, with its specific arguments against slavery, was an important step in Abraham Lincoln's political ascension.

The 1854 Kansas–Nebraska Act, written to form the territories of Kansas and Nebraska, was designed by Stephen A. Douglas, then the chairman of the Senate Committee on Territories. The Act included language that allowed settlers to decide whether they would or would not accept slavery in their region. Lincoln saw this as a repeal of the 1820 Missouri Compromise, which had outlawed slavery above the 36°30' parallel.

== History ==
Lincoln was compelled to argue his case against the Kansas-Nebraska Act in three public speeches during September and October 1854, all in direct response to Douglas. The most comprehensive address was given by Lincoln in Peoria, Illinois, on October 16. The three-hour speech that evening on the lawn of the Peoria County Courthouse, transcribed after the fact by Lincoln himself, presented thorough moral, legal, economic, and historical (citing the Founding Fathers) arguments against slavery, and set the stage for Lincoln's political future.

Horace White was a young journalist working as the city editor of the Chicago Evening Journal when he first saw Lincoln:

It was a warmish day in early October, and Mr. Lincoln was in his shirt sleeves when he stepped on the platform. I observed that, although awkward, he was not in the least embarrassed. He began in a slow and hesitating manner, but without any mistakes of language, dates, or facts. It was evident that he had mastered his subject, that he knew what he was going to say, and that he knew he was right.

— Horace White

White described the speakers:

At the appointed time Douglas and Lincoln entered the hall, the former taking a seat on the front row of benches and the latter advancing to the platform. The two men presented a wide contrast in personal appearance, Lincoln being 6 feet 3 inches high, lean, angular, raw boned, with a complexion of leather, unkempt, and with clothes that seemed to have dropped on him and might drop off; Douglas, almost a dwarf, only 5 feet 4 inches high, but rotund, portly, smooth faced, with ruddy complexion and a lion-like mane, and dressed in clothes of faultless fit.

— Horace White

White described Lincoln's style of speaking in colorful terms:

Progressing with his theme, his words began to come faster and his face to light up with the rays of genius and his body to move in unison with his thoughts. His gestures were made with his body and head rather than with his arms.... His speaking went to the heart because it came from the heart. I have heard celebrated orators who could start thunders of applause without changing any man's opinion. Mr. Lincoln's eloquence was of the higher type, which produced conviction in others because of the conviction of the speaker himself. His listeners felt that he believed every word he said, and that, like Martin Luther, he would go to the stake rather than abate one jot or tittle of it. In such transfigured moments as these he was the type of the ancient Hebrew prophet as I learned that character at Sunday-school in my childhood.

— Horace White

Lincoln's speech in many ways foreshadowed the political future that he would soon embark upon:

Little by little, but steadily as man's march to the grave, we have been giving up the OLD for the NEW faith. Nearly eighty years ago we began by declaring that all men are created equal; but now from that beginning we have run down to the other declaration, that for SOME men to enslave OTHERS is a 'sacred right of self-government.' These principles cannot stand together. They are as opposite as God and mammon; and whoever holds to the one, must despise the other.

— Abraham Lincoln

== See also ==
- Abraham Lincoln on slavery
