= Into Harm's Way =

2012 American documentary film

- Title card
- Directed by: Jordan Kronick
- Produced by: Thomas F. Beckner IV; Jordan Kronick
- Cinematography: Stephen McCarthy; Erich Roland
- Edited by: Peter R. Livingston Jr.
- Music by: Anton Sanko; Joel Thompson
- Production company: West Point Center for Oral History
- Distributed by: The Documentary Group
- Release date: May 15, 2012 (GI Film Festival)
- Running time: 95 minutes
- Country: United States
- Language: English

Into Harm's Way is a 2012 American documentary film. The film features a series of interviews with the members of the United States Military Academy class of 1967 and their experiences during their college career at West Point and later in the Vietnam War. The movie was produced and directed by Jordan Kronick for the West Point Center for Oral History. The Center's director, journalist Todd Brewster, served as the film's executive producer. The film opened at the GI Film Festival on May 15, 2012.
