= West Point Center for Oral History =

United States Military Academy's Centers

In this clip from the Center's archives Medal of Honor recipient Leroy Petry discusses his prosthetic hand.

An excerpt from the Center's archives with Medal of Honor recipient Colonel Jack Jacobs.

The West Point Center for Oral History is one of the United States Military Academy's Centers for Excellence. This Center is devoted to capturing the story of the American soldier in both war and peace. Unlike other oral history archives, the West Point Center for Oral History is a video archive that records interviews using state-of-the-art video technology and produces documentary films using their footage.

== History ==
In this clip from the Center's archives Technical Sergeant Paul Andert speaks about a humorous interaction with General Patton.

The Center for Oral History was started in 2008 by Colonel Lance Betros, then head of West Point's history department. The founding director was journalist and author Todd Brewster, who served in that capacity from 2008 to 2013. Brewster remains a member of the Center's advisory board, which includes, among others, Ken Burns, Sebastian Junger, Martha Raddatz, Brent Scowcroft, and Jack Jacobs. The Center officially launched in October 2011 with its website and its first documentary film, Into Harm's Way. This film was produced by The Documentary Group, a New York City based film production company founded by Tom Yellin and Kayce Freed Jennings, with Brewster serving as Executive Producer of the project.

== The collection ==
The Center contains hundreds of interviews from soldiers, policy makers, politicians, and others whose lives have touched the profession of arms. Its interview subjects currently include veterans of World War I, World War II, Korea, Vietnam, Desert Storm, Bosnia, the Iraq War, and the 2000s War in Afghanistan.

== See also ==
- Into Harm's Way (2013, Documentary)
- Oral History
- Todd Brewster
- United States Military Academy
