= The Century for Young People =

1999 book by Peter Jennings and Todd Brewster

- Author: Peter Jennings and Todd Brewster
- Language: English
- Subject: 20th century
- Genre: Young Adult Nonfiction
- Publisher: Random House, Inc.
- Publication date: October 1999
- Publication place: United States
- Media type: Print (Hardcover)
- Pages: 245 pp.
- ISBN: 0-385-32708-0
- OCLC: 42431186
- Dewey Decimal: 909.82 21
- LC Class: D422 .A76 1999

The Century for Young People is a non-fiction history book written by Peter Jennings and Todd Brewster. This book is an adapted version of The Century, adapted by Jennifer Armstrong. The book contains over 200 pictures to depict the 100 years of history.

== Criticisms ==
Although the book is targeted for children in the range of 8–12 years old, some people have raised the concerns that the book is too difficult for the targeted audience. Some adults have raised concerns over the content of the book. They have expressed concerns that the material found in the book is too graphic and obscene for children to read. Specifically, issues have been raised over the depiction of the first hand accounts found in the book, such as the descriptive stories of cannibalism during the famine period in the Soviet Union.

== See also ==
- Lincoln's Gamble
