= Richard Striner =

American preservationist, historian, and author

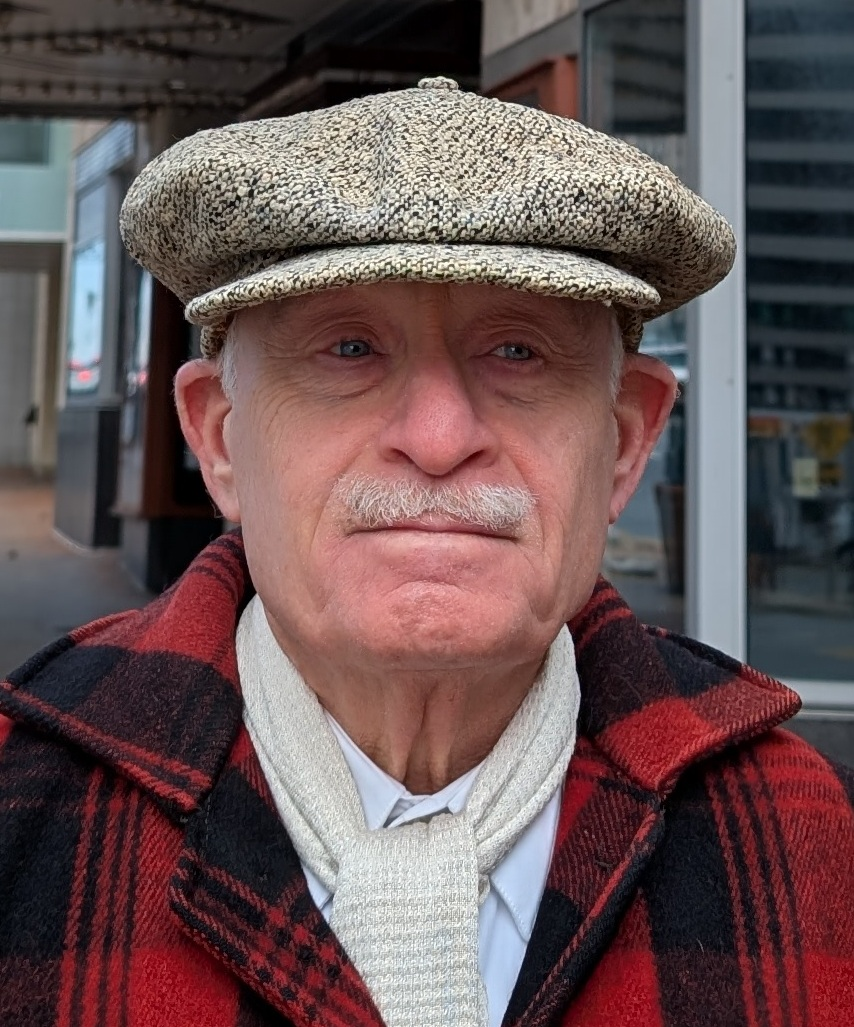
- Richard Striner in front of AFI Silver in February 2025
- Born: November 22, 1950 (age 75); Syracuse, New York, U.S.
- Education: American University (BA); University of Maryland (PhD)
- Occupations: Professor; historian; author
- Years active: 1982-present
- Known for: Historic preservation

Richard Striner (born November 22, 1950) is an American retired professor of history who was awarded the Renchard Prize for Historic Preservation in 1993. Striner was the founding president of the Art Deco Society of Washington from 1982 to 1992. He is a retired professor of history at Washington College. Striner authored books about Art Deco, public policy, American presidents, economics, educational policy, and spirituality.

== Early life and education ==
Striner was raised in Washington, D.C., where his mother worked at GSA and his father was dean of the Kogod School of Business. Striner has one sister.

Striner attended American University, initially as an art major, but graduating in 1972 as an American Studies major. His outspoken essays in the college newspaper, The Eagle, won praise from Washington Post columnist Colman McCarthy.

Writing about Striner’s essay “Our Decadent Youth Culture,” which appeared in the March 13, 1970 issue of The Eagle, McCarthy wrote that "it probably took courage to write a piece like this for a college audience. But we suspect many in Striner’s audience appreciated his speaking out ... . We hope Mr. Striner writes more on the subject."

Striner earned his Ph.D. in 1982 from the University of Maryland. His dissertation, "The Machine as Symbol: 1920–1939," was mentioned in a Washington Post article by journalist Michael Kernan.

== Historic preservation ==
In 1982, Striner founded a historic preservation and cultural affinity group, the Art Deco Society of Washington. Striner led three major preservation campaigns on behalf of the Society. In 1983, he helped to prevent the demolition of Greenbelt Center School, the architectural centerpiece of the New Deal planned suburb, Greenbelt, Maryland. The preserved building now serves as the Greenbelt Community Center.

In 1984, Striner launched a campaign to preserve the streamlined Greyhound bus terminal of Washington. This building, which opened in 1940, was widely hailed at the time as the “Grand Central of the Motor Bus World,” and it was designed by architect William S. Arrasmith. The preservation case was notable because the building had been covered over in 1976 by a "slipcover" renovation and the original building was completely hidden from view when the preservation case was launched. The case gained national publicity for this reason, and the landmark designation of the building set a novel precedent in preservation law. The restoration of the Greyhound Terminal was completed in 1991, and this event too gained national publicity. For this and other preservation achievements in the Nation’s Capital, Striner was awarded the Renchard Prize for Historic Preservation by the Historical Society of Washington, D.C. in 1993.

The third preservation campaign led by Striner was the decades-long fight to save the 1938 Silver Theater and Silver Spring Shopping Center complex in the Maryland suburb of Silver Spring. The complex was designed by the architect John Eberson, who was known in his lifetime as the "Dean of American Theater Architects."

The preservation initiative started in 1984 triggered a full-scale preservation-versus-development battle in Montgomery County, Maryland. The owners of the theater and shopping center sent a crew of wreckers to destroy the exterior ornamentation of the complex in an attempt to ruin its architectural design. The stakes of the battle were raised in 1986, when a developer proposed to demolish the complex and replace it with a regional shopping mall. In response, the Art Deco Society nominated the theater-shopping center complex to the National Register of Historic Places, and the complex was determined to be eligible in 1987.

Eventually, the entire complex was saved and restored to its 1938 appearance. The Silver Theater is now the East Coast home of the American Film Institute (AFI). Striner’s role in the project was lauded by Washington Post architecture critic Benjamin Forgey, who wrote "preservationist Striner held on to this issue like a bulldog for 19 years. He merits the last word: 'To have lived to see this is quite thrilling and miraculous.'"

Striner donated his preservation case files to the Historical Society of Washington, D.C. (now the D.C. History Center), and this collection, the "Richard Striner Historic Preservation Papers," is available for use by researchers.

== Academic career ==
Striner served as a professor of history from 1988 to 2020 at Washington College in Chestertown, Maryland. He attained tenure in 1993.

== Authorship ==
=== Historic preservation ===
Striner and architect Hans Wirz co-authored the book Washington Deco: Art Deco Design in the Nation’s Capital, which was published in 1984. Two favorable reviews in the Washington Post raised awareness about Washington, D.C.'s Art Deco heritage. Striner and co-author Melissa F. Blair compared Art Deco architecture in two cities in their book Washington and Baltimore Art Deco: A Design History of Neighboring Cities, which was published in 2014. The book won a design award from Washington Publishers.

=== Presidential leadership ===
Striner wrote several books about presidential leadership, beginning with Father Abraham: Lincoln’s Relentless Struggle to End Slavery in 2006. In Lincoln’s Way: How Six Great Presidents Created American Power (2010), Striner presented Abraham Lincoln as the first in a series of presidents who blended elements of conservative and liberal statecraft, thus creating an American centrist tradition. "Striner tackles the great paradox of Abraham Lincoln’s writings and speeches on race" in Lincoln and Race (2012). "Striner’s examination of Lincoln’s words is more in the nature of a legal analysis, and it is a discerning one."

Striner "flays Wilson's 'miserable judgment,' managerial incompetence, 'naïve suppositions,' disdain for Congress, unsystematic work habits, as well as such character flaws as petulance and grandiosity" in Woodrow Wilson and World War I: A Burden Too Great to Bear (2014). "Striner provides modern-day readers with the key to avoiding foreign policy shortfalls: do not elect sickly, and newly widowed, presidents."

Striner also wrote two full-scale biographies of presidents. Summoned to Glory: The Audacious Life of Abraham Lincoln (2020) 'takes direct aim at all the biographies of Lincoln that see him as displaying 'essential passivity' or 'reluctance to take the initiative and make bold plans.'" Politico chose Ike in Love and War: How Dwight D. Eisenhower Sacrificed Himself to Keep the Peace (2023) as a best political biography of the year. "Read it alongside the Ford tome to learn about two of the most underrated leaders of the last century and pine for the days when centrism was not a dirty word."

=== Cinematic tradition ===
Striner wrote two books about a cinematic tradition of films from the 1920s onward that combined the themes of love, death, and the afterlife. In Supernatural Romance in Film: Tales of Love, Death, and the Afterlife (2011), "Striner describes this genre as using 'supernatural devices to express the theme that love can transcend our mortality.' And although this theme dates back to antiquity (Orpheus and Euridice) it hasn’t been fully and comprehensively assessed until now." Love in the Afterlife: Underground Religion at the Movies (2016) explores "films about lovers who meet again (and love again) in heaven, via reincarnation, or through other kinds of after-death encounters."

=== Economics ===
Striner wrote a public policy book on monetary reform, How America Can Spend Its Way Back to Greatness (2016), based on his cover story for the magazine American Scholar, "How to Pay for What We Need" (2012). Striner contributed to the literature on economic depressions with his book Hard times: Economic Depressions in America (2018).

=== Public policy ===
The Baltimore Sun summarized Striner's first book on public policy, The Civic Deal (2000): "To conservatives: loosen up on taxes, religion and other fixations; to liberals, get smart about race, get tough about crime. To both: compromise." Striner and co-author L. Michelle Johnson wrote No Size Fits All: A New Program of Choice for American Public Schools Without Vouchers (2020). Striner also wrote Spirituality for the Independent Thinker: Themes of Religious Exploration (2021).

=== Commentaries ===
Striner has written op-ed commentaries for newspapers and other publications.

He contributed seven articles to the New York Times "Disunion" series on the Civil War. His article "How Lincoln Undid the Union" was included when many essays from the series were compiled into a book. The series and the book were well reviewed for their scope and diversity. "For example, Striner’s essay on Lincoln’s audacity in late 1861, regarding slavery in Delaware, is countered by Michael Fellman's essay on Lincoln’s trepidation regarding slavery in Missouri."

Another series of this type comprised three articles on Woodrow Wilson that History News Network commissioned him to write for the World War I centennial. Other Striner op-eds have placed contemporary events in historical context and offered contemporaneous commentary. Still other Striner op-eds have been largely contemporary in their nature.

== Works ==
=== Books ===
- with Kennon, Donald R. (1983). Washington Past and Present: a Guide to the Nation's Capital (2nd ed.). Washington, D.C: United States Capitol Historical Society.
- with Wirz, Hans (1984). Washington Deco: Art Deco Design in the Nation's Capital. Washington, D.C: Smithsonian Institution Press. ISBN 978-0-87474-970-0.
- Mostly Moderne: Views from America's Past. Washington, D.C: National Trust for Historic Preservation. 1989. ISBN 978-0-89133-150-6.
- Art Deco. Abbeville Stylebooks. New York: Abbeville Press. 1994. ISBN 1-55859-824-3.
- The Civic Deal: Re-empowering Our Great Republic. Washington, D.C: Pericles Institute. 2000. ISBN 0-9675462-0-6.
- Father Abraham: Lincoln's Relentless Struggle to End Slavery. Oxford; New York: Oxford University Press. 2006. ISBN 978-0-19-518306-1.
- Lincoln's Way: How Six Great Presidents Created American Power. Lanham, Md: Rowman & Littlefield Publishers. 2010. ISBN 978-1-4422-0065-4.
- Supernatural Romance in Film: Tales of Love, Death and the Afterlife. Jefferson, N.C: McFarland & Company, Inc., Publishers. 2011. ISBN 978-0-7864-4664-3.
- Lincoln and Race. Concise Lincoln library. Carbondale: Southern Illinois University Press. 2012. ISBN 978-0-8093-3077-5.
- with Blair, Melissa (2014). Washington and Baltimore Art Deco: a Design History of Neighboring Cities. Baltimore, Maryland: Johns Hopkins University Press. ISBN 978-1-4214-1162-0.
- Woodrow Wilson and World War I: a Burden Too Great to Bear. Lanham: Rowman & Littlefield. 2014. ISBN 978-1-4422-2937-2.
- How America Can Spend Its Way Back to Greatness: a guide to monetary reform. Santa Barbara, California: Praeger, an imprint of ABC-CLIO, LLC. 2015. ISBN 978-1-4408-3876-7.
- Love in the Afterlife: Underground Religion at the Movies. Madison, [New Jersey]: Fairleigh Dickinson University Press. 2016. ISBN 978-1-61147-884-6.
- Hard Times: Economic Depressions in America. The American ways series. Lanham, Maryland: Rowman & Littlefield. 2018. ISBN 978-1-4422-5323-0.
- Summoned to Glory: the Audacious Life of Abraham Lincoln. Lanham: Rowman & Littlefield. 2020. ISBN 978-1-5381-3716-1.
- with Johnson, L. Michelle (2020). No Size Fits All: a New Program of Choice for American Public Schools Without Vouchers. London, UK; New York, NY: Anthem Press. ISBN 978-1-78527-232-5.
- Spirituality for the Independent Thinker: Themes of Religious Exploration. London; New York, NY: First Hill Books. 2021. ISBN 978-1-83998-125-8.
- Ike in Love and War: How Dwight D. Eisenhower Sacrificed Himself to Keep the Peace. New York: Post Hill Press. 2023. ISBN 978-1-63758-422-4.

=== Other selected works ===
- "How Lincoln Undid the Union". Opinionator. The New York Times. December 13, 2010.
- "How to Pay for What We Need". The American Scholar. November 30, 2011.
- "Abraham Lincoln's Audacious Plan". Opinionator. The New York Times. January 5, 2012.
- "Lincoln's Abolitionist Wedge". Opinionator. The New York Times. April 11, 2012.
- "Lincoln's Plan Emerges". Opinionator. The New York Times. July 23, 2012.
- "Lincoln's Great Gamble". Opinionator. The New York Times. September 21, 2012.
- "'Hurrah for Old Abe'". Opinionator. The New York Times. January 29, 2013.
- "The Radicalism of Lincoln's 10 Percent Plan". Opinionator. The New York Times. December 12, 2013.
- "Woodrow Wilson's Four Mistakes in the Early Years of World War I". History News Network. June 1, 2014.
- "Woodrow Wilson's Blunders as a Wartime President". History News Network. June 8, 2014.
- "The Surprising Evidence that Woodrow Wilson Was Suffering from a Brain Malfunction Before the Stroke that Crippled Him". History News Network. June 15, 2014.
