= Lincoln's Gamble =

2014 book by Todd Brewster

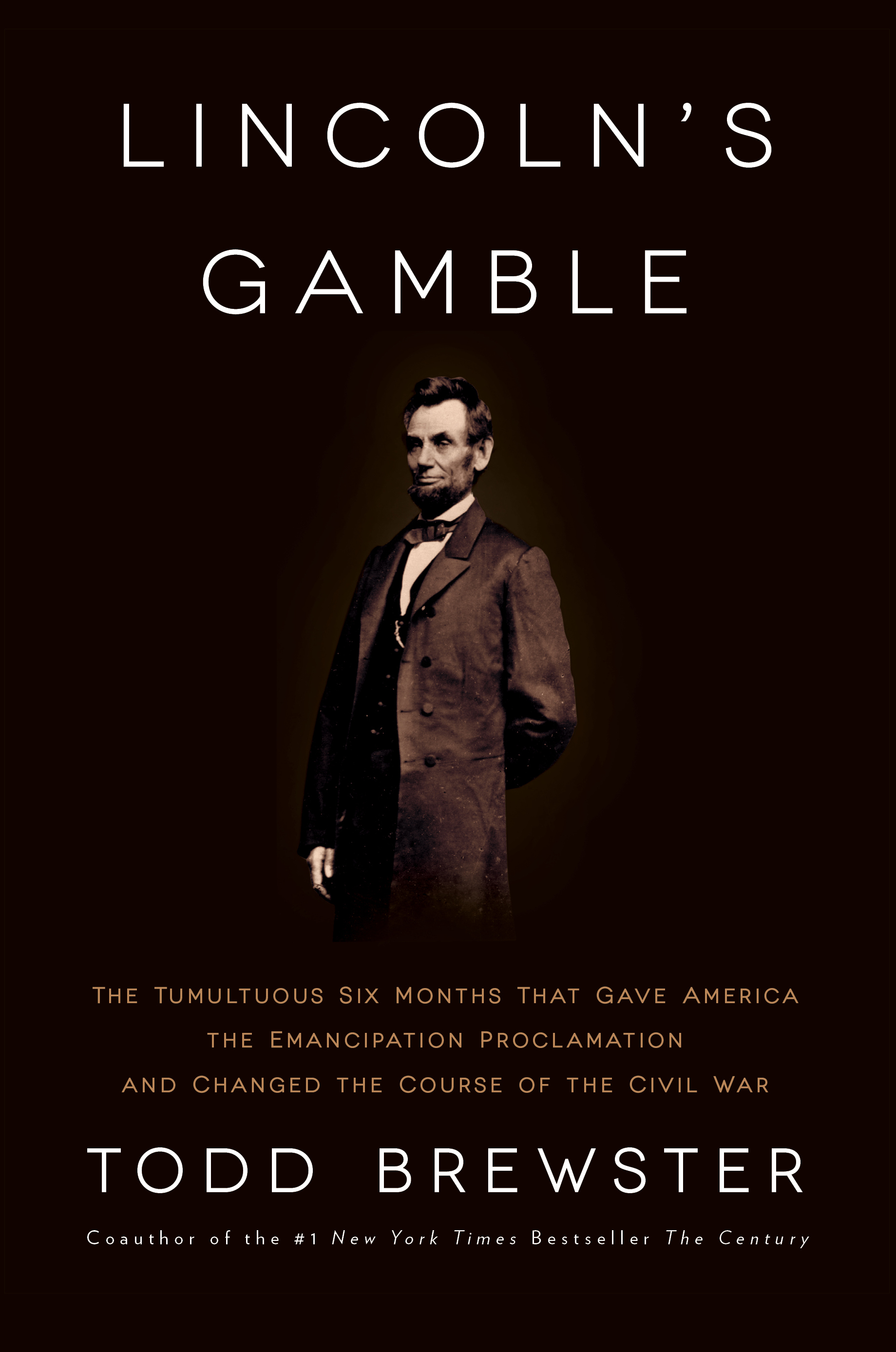
- Author: Todd Brewster
- Language: English
- Subject: Abraham Lincoln and the Emancipation Proclamation
- Genre: History
- Publisher: Scribner
- Publication date: September 9, 2014
- Publication place: United States
- Media type: Print (Hardcover)
- Pages: 368 pp.
- ISBN: 978-1451693867

Lincoln's Gamble: The Tumultuous Six Months that Gave America the Emancipation Proclamation and Changed the Course of the Civil War is a book by Todd Brewster, an American author, academic, journalist, and film producer.

The work explores six months of Abraham Lincoln's presidency: the period between July 12, 1862 and January 1, 1863 when Lincoln penned the Emancipation Proclamation and changed the course of the Civil War. During this time Lincoln struggled with his strategy for the war, quarreled with his cabinet, and wrestled with how best to free the slaves.

Lincoln’s Gamble was published on September 9, 2014.

== Background ==
Lincoln’s Gamble is Brewster's fourth book. Brewster previously collaborated with the late Peter Jennings to write The Century, The Century for Young People, and In Search of America.

"The Emancipation Proclamation is one of the three most important documents in American history, and yet it is by far the least known," Brewster said in an interview with dailyhistory.org:

[Y]et unlike either of [the other two documents, the Declaration of Independence and the Constitution], the [Emancipation Proclamation] was really the work of one man, Abraham Lincoln. How is it, I wondered, that we do not know more about this document, about its origin and development and the history of its authorship? And why is it so different from anything else that Lincoln ever wrote? No stirring phrases, no poetry here, only dense legalese. How do we make sense of it with everything else we know about him?

Brewster's quest led him to focus on the six months between July 1862 and January 1863, which "served as a neatly contained episode of Lincoln’s life in that they framed the time when he first mentioned the Proclamation and the date when he actually signed the document. More than that, those six months were some of the most turbulent for Lincoln, the nation, and the war."

The Lincoln that Brewster discovered was a man wracked by uncertainty, doubt and psychological pain. The author's introduction leans heavily on a quote from the great black leader W. E. B. DuBois who had once described Lincoln as "a Southern poor white, of illegitimate birth, poorly educated … unusually ugly … and a politician down to his toes." Although DuBois initially derides Lincoln, he goes on to say that he loves Lincoln, "not because he was perfect, but because he was not and yet triumphed."

== Central argument ==
Describing the central argument of the book, Brewster wrote:

Emancipation was not a simple decision for Lincoln and in the end it could have gone either way. His struggles with the proclamation -- its wording, its timing, its very existence -- fell into a period of time when he was in great personal crisis. The crisis had to do with his loss of faith in reason and man’s ability to control his own fate. Long an agnostic, he became a fatalist adhering to the belief in a God who moves in mysterious ways. After being frustrated by his generals and their adherence to a "science" of warfare, one that maximized results and minimized bloodshed, Lincoln turned to a more aggressive approach to war -- a hard war -- that prefigured the "total wars" of the twentieth century. A man of the law, Lincoln increasingly took extra-lawful, extra-constitutional actions that prompted many to see him as a tyrant. A lifelong opponent of slavery, he was a pessimist about the ability for blacks and whites to live together in harmony in a post-slavery world. All of this heat — this instability — came to the foreground in the proclamation and the question as to whether he would go through with it. He was caught in a contradiction: at once believing that God controlled the fate of the nation yet still needing to act as if what he did mattered. Even the proclamation itself appeared on the face of it to be an act of futility: since he relied on his war powers to justify the act, the only slaves he could "free" were the ones in the rebel states over which he had no power and from a legal standpoint, his ability to free them ended with the war itself. He could not have known with any certainty that the proclamation would work, and yet in the end he signed it and it did work. To me, the book is a demonstration of Lincoln's humanity. He fretted, doubted, refused to believe, then believed, was optimistic, then pessimistic, started to act, then withdrew from action. Sometimes we get used to thinking that the greatest among us are immortal. They are not. They are human. Lincoln may have been a giant among men, but he was still a man.

== Reception ==
Lincoln’s Gamble received favorable reviews.

Publishers Weekly praised the way "Brewster brings elegant clarity to the tangle of conflicting ideologies, loyalties, and practicalities that pushed the proclamation forward, ultimately ensuring Lincoln’s legacy as the Great Emancipator."

Ken Burns, the director and producer of the acclaimed documentary The Civil War, also lauded the book, stating: "It’s hard to act from strength and a higher moral conviction when the war you’re waging is not going well. But in this wonderful study, Todd Brewster authoritatively evokes the strategy of our best president to change the terms of the Civil War and thereby the destiny of his nation."

In another positive review Lieutenant General H.R. McMaster, the American military historian who wrote Dereliction of Duty: Johnson, McNamara, the Joint Chiefs of Staff, and the Lies That Led to Vietnam, commented:

Readers of this expertly-told tale may note parallels to other times in American history when the lack of a clear mission hampered war efforts. Yet this, finally, is a story of courage and leadership, a stirring account of how Lincoln, perhaps our greatest warrior-president, took firm control of the war, gave clear direction to his generals and, with his historic proclamation, established a purpose worthy of the sacrifices so many made in that epic American ordeal.

A recurring theme throughout reviews of Lincoln’s Gamble is the way Brewster successfully captured the flawed and often indecisive man that Lincoln was, not the larger-than-life legend Lincoln subsequently became. This was Brewster's goal; as critic Gilbert Taylor explained in his Booklist review:

In this historical essay about the Emancipation Proclamation, Brewster explores the six months between Lincoln's July 1862 decision to issue it and actually doing so in January 1863. Inspired by a 1922 article on Lincoln by W. E. B. DuBois, the purpose of which was to portray Lincoln as great but imperfect, Brewster sets as his goal a quest for the "real" Lincoln.... Featuring vignettes of figures who met Lincoln during his formulation of the proclamation, Brewster’s work illuminates Lincoln's lines of thought during this turning point in American history.

ABC News anchor George Stephanopoulos praised this facet of Brewster's work, writing: "Brewster gets inside Abraham Lincoln’s mind, revealing his struggles with the limited powers of his office. Here is Lincoln, the man, surprisingly ambivalent about the decision for which he is most remembered. A masterful psychological portrait." Similarly, Joseph J. Ellis, American historian and bestselling author of the Pulitzer Prize-winning book Founding Brothers: The Revolutionary Generation, emphasized the way Brewster opened a window into the indecision that plagued Lincoln, noting, "This story has been told before, but never as well, with such a firm grasp of the revolutionary implications of Lincoln’s decision, or the multilayered levels of Lincoln’s quite tortured thought process. Although Lincoln is the most written-about figure in American history, Brewster’s book is a major entry in the Lincoln sweepstakes."

== See also ==
- Abraham Lincoln
- Todd Brewster
- American Civil War
- Emancipation Proclamation
- W. E. B. Du Bois
- The Century for Young People
