= Todd Brewster =

American film producer

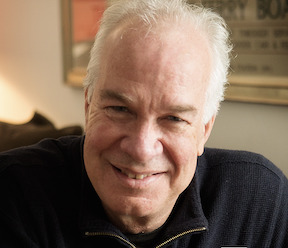
Todd Brewster

Todd Brewster is an American author, journalist, and film producer. He is presently the senior visiting lecturer in journalism at Mount Holyoke College in South Hadley, Massachusetts.

== Career ==
Brewster served as senior editorial producer for ABC News and co-authored three books with the late Peter Jennings: The Century, The Century for Young People, and In Search of America. The Century, a 600-page book on the history of the twentieth century, was originally designed as a companion book for ABC's 1999 documentary series of the same name, but months before the series debuted, the book had already topped the New York Times Best Seller List. It remained near the top of the list for nearly a year and is believed to have sold more than 1.5 million copies, more than any "companion book" in publishing history.

From 2004 to 2005, Brewster served as a Knight Fellow at Yale Law School and from 2005 to 2006 as distinguished visiting professor of government at Wesleyan University.

He has written extensively on constitutional issues and is the director of the National Constitution Center's The Peter Jennings Project for Journalists and the Constitution. Brewster has written for Vanity Fair, Time, The New York Times and Life, where he was a senior editor from 1988 to 1992. A native of Indianapolis Indiana, he was inducted into the Indiana Journalism Hall of Fame in 2000.

From 2008 to 2013, Brewster was the Don E. Ackerman Director of Oral History at West Point. He was also director of United States Military Academy's West Point Center for Oral History. He was executive producer of Into Harm's Way, a 2013 documentary film about the West Point Class of 1967. His book, Lincoln's Gamble, on the six months leading up to the signing of the Emancipation Proclamation, was published by Scribner in September 2014 and hailed by historian Joe Ellis: "This story has been told before," wrote Ellis, "but never as well, with such a firm grasp of the revolutionary implications of Lincoln's decision, or the multilayered levels of Lincoln's quite tortured thought process. Although Lincoln is the most written-about figure in American history, Brewster's book is a major entry in the Lincoln sweepstakes."

In 2022, Brewster co-authored (with Marc Lamont Hill) "Seen and Unseen: Technology, Social Media, and the Fight for Racial Justice." Writing in The Guardian, Charles Kaiser described "Seen and Unseen" as "a brilliant new book" that, while acknowledging the dangers of technology and social media, focuses "overwhelmingly on the positive effects of Twitter and Black Twitter, which [the authors] argue have democratized access to information" and on "the power of the smartphone to provide the incontrovertible video evidence needed to prosecute the murderers of men like George Floyd and Ahmaud Arbery." Brewster's book, American Childhood: a Photographic History, was published by Scribner in May, 2023. There he "boldy claims," wrote the New York Times reviewer that "Americans invented childhood."

== Publications ==
- The Century
- The Century for Young People
- In Search of America
- Lincoln's Gamble
- Seen and Unseen
- American Childhood: A Photographic History

== See also ==
- National Constitution Center
- Oral History
- Into Harm's Way (2012, Documentary)
