= Charles Stearns =

Charles Stearns may refer to:

- Charles Stearns (minister) (1753–1826), American minister
- Charles F. Stearns (1866–1946), chief justice of the Rhode Island Supreme Court
- Charles H. Stearns (1854–1936), lieutenant governor of Vermont
- Charles Thomas Stearns (1807–1898), member of the Minnesota Territorial Council
- Charles Woodward Stearns (1818–1887), American physician and author
