= Lyman Trumbull =

American politician (1813–1896)

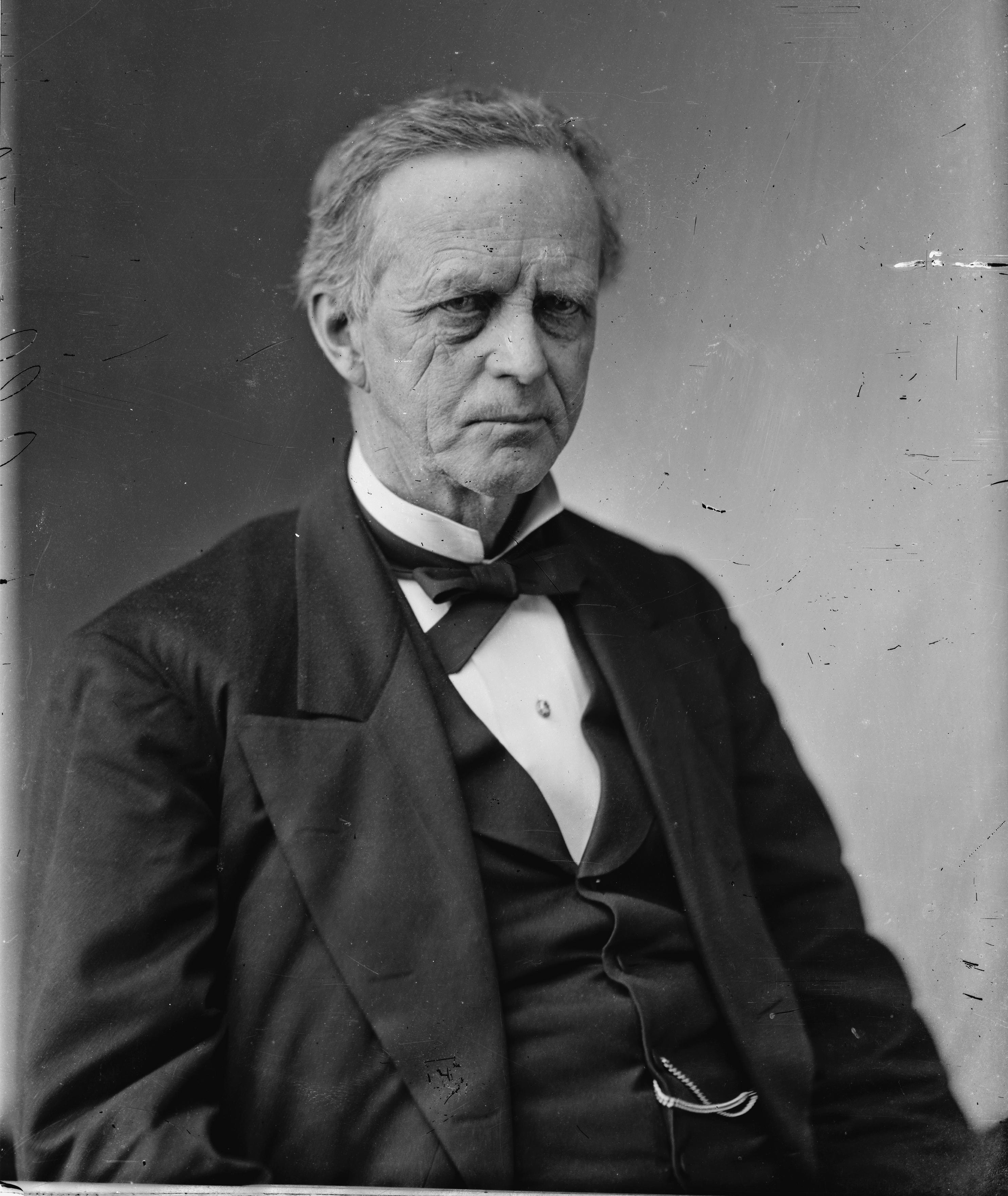
- Trumbull c. 1870

Chair of the Senate Judiciary Committee
- In office March 4, 1861 – March 3, 1873
- Preceded by: James A. Bayard Jr.
- Succeeded by: George G. Wright

United States Senator from Illinois
- In office March 4, 1855 – March 3, 1873
- Preceded by: James Shields
- Succeeded by: Richard Oglesby

Member-elect to the U.S. House of Representatives from Illinois's 8th district
- In office Elected 1854, not seated
- Preceded by: William Bissell
- Succeeded by: James Morrison

Justice of the Supreme Court of Illinois
- In office 1848–1853

Secretary of State of Illinois
- In office 1841–1843
- Governor: Thomas Carlin; Thomas Ford
- Preceded by: Stephen A. Douglas
- Succeeded by: Thompson Campbell

Personal details
- Born: October 12, 1813 Colchester, Connecticut, U.S.
- Died: June 25, 1896 (aged 82) Chicago, Illinois, U.S.
- Resting place: Oak Woods Cemetery
- Party: Democratic (before 1857, 1872–1894); Republican (1857–1870); Liberal Republican (1870–1872); Populist (1894–1896)
- Spouse(s): Julia Jayne; Mary Ingram
- Children: Walter
- Relatives: Benjamin Trumbull (grandfather)

Lyman Trumbull (October 12, 1813 – June 25, 1896) was an American lawyer, judge, and politician who represented the state of Illinois in the United States Senate from 1855 to 1873. Trumbull was a leading abolitionist attorney and key political ally to Abraham Lincoln and authored several landmark pieces of reform as chair of the Judiciary Committee during the American Civil War and Reconstruction era, including the Confiscation Acts, which created the legal basis for the Emancipation Proclamation; the Thirteenth Amendment to the United States Constitution, which abolished chattel slavery; and the Civil Rights Act of 1866, which led to the Fourteenth Amendment to the United States Constitution.

Born in Colchester, Connecticut to a prominent political family, Trumbull studied law in Greenville, Georgia, before moving to Illinois to establish a practice and enter politics. He served as the Illinois Secretary of State from 1841 to 1843 and as a justice of the Illinois Supreme Court from 1848 to 1853. As an attorney, Trumbull successfully argued the case Jarrot v. Jarrot, which de facto banned slavery in the state.

In 1855, Trumbull was elected to the Senate as the choice of the anti-slavery faction of the Illinois legislature, defeating Abraham Lincoln. Lincoln endorsed Trumbull for the election; the two soon became leading members of the new Republican Party. After the American Civil War, Trumbull was a leading moderate Republican, favoring both civil rights for freed slaves and reconciliation with the South.

In the 1868 impeachment trial of President Andrew Johnson, Trumbull voted to acquit Johnson despite heavy pressure from other Republican senators. He broke with the Republicans in 1870 and was a candidate for the presidency at the 1872 Liberal Republican convention. After returning to the Democratic Party, Trumbull left the Senate in 1873 to establish a legal practice in Chicago. Before his death in 1896, he became a member of the Populist Party and represented Eugene V. Debs before the Supreme Court of the United States.

== Education and early life ==
Lyman Trumbull was born in Colchester, Connecticut on October 12, 1813, to Connecticut's leading political family, which included three Governors and had arrived in the Massachusetts Bay Colony from Newcastle upon Tyne in 1639. His father, Benjamin Trumbull Jr., was an attorney, farmer, state representative, and the son of the historian Benjamin Trumbull. His mother, Elizabeth Mather, was a member of the Mather family of prominent New England Congregationalist clergymen including Increase Mather and Cotton Mather. Lyman was the seventh of eleven children, eight of whom survived into adulthood.

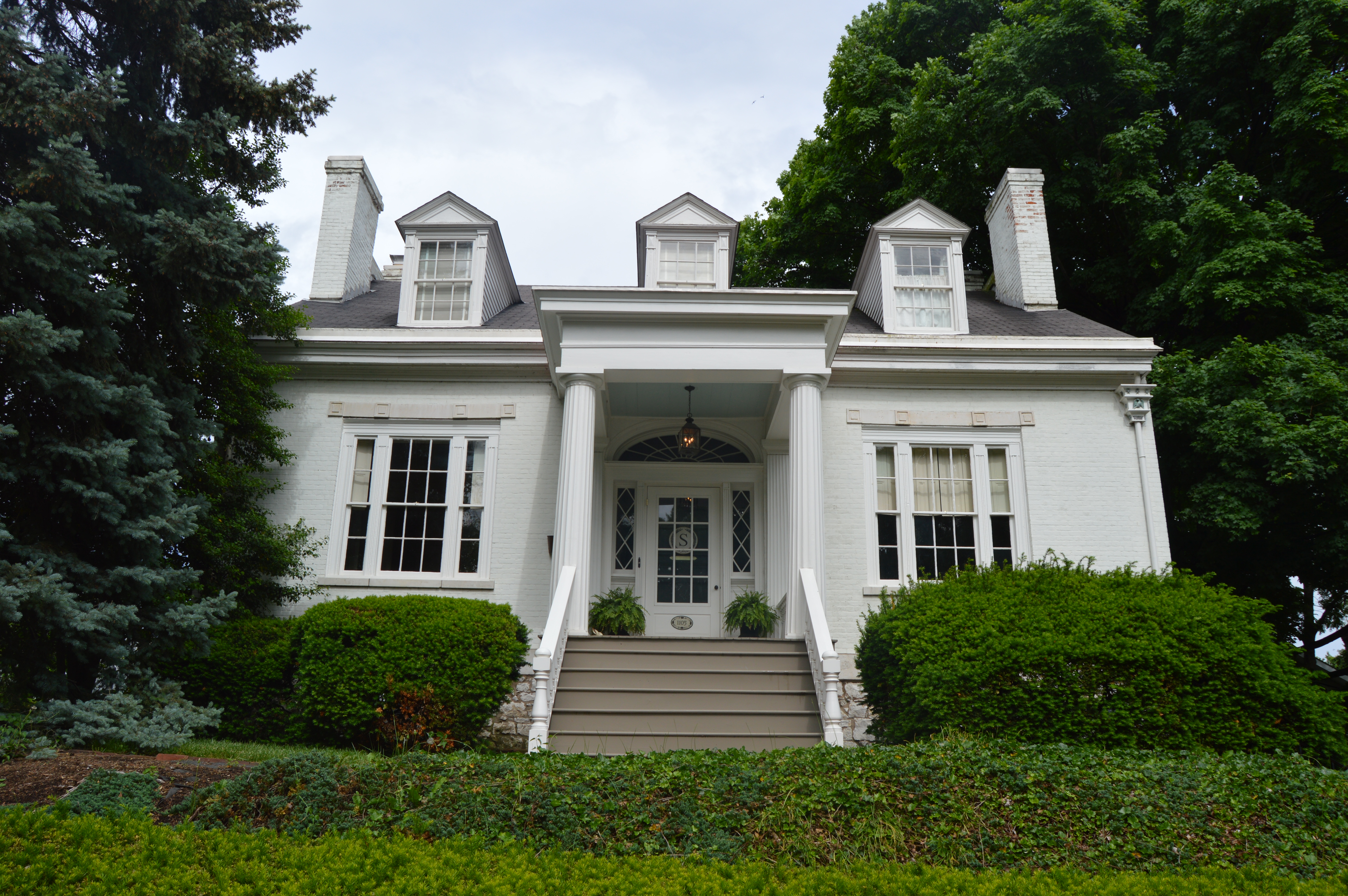
As a young man, Trumbull relocated from Connecticut to Illinois, where his home in Alton is now a National Historic Site.

Trumbull attended Bacon Academy in Colchester, where he studied a traditional course in math, Latin, and Greek. When he turned eighteen, he teaching in Portland, Connecticut; New Jersey and Colchester. In 1833, he traveled to Pike County, Georgia, in hopes of becoming a schoolteacher there. Finding no position available, he proceeded to Greenville, where he was hired as principal of the Greenville Academy. Trumbull remained at Greenville for three years, where he read law in the offices of Hiram B. Warner. In 1837, he moved to Belleville, Illinois, where he began a legal practice in the office of John Reynolds, the former Governor of Illinois.

While living in Belleville in November 1837, Trumbull became aware of the murder of Elijah P. Lovejoy, an abolitionist minister and newspaper publisher, in nearby Alton. In a letter to his father, the young Trumbull predicted, "[Lovejoy's] death and the manner in which he was slain will make thousands of abolitionists, and far more than his writings would have made had he published his paper an hundred years. … As much as I am opposed to the immediate emancipation of the slaves and to the doctrine of Abolitionism, yet I am more opposed to mob violence and outrage, and had I been in Alton, I would have cheerfully marched to the rescue of Mr. Lovejoy and his property."

== Early legal, political and judicial career ==
In 1840, Trumbull was elected from St. Clair County to the Illinois House of Representatives as a member of the Democratic Party. He only served briefly in the House, where his colleagues included Abraham Lincoln and his future Senate colleague William Alexander Richardson. In 1841, Stephen A. Douglas resigned as Secretary of State of Illinois to become a member of the Illinois Supreme Court, and Governor Thomas Carlin appointed Trumbull to succeed him. Trumbull remained Secretary of State for two years, devoting most of his time to his legal practice while his brother Benjamin cared for the routine duties of the office. In 1843, Governor Thomas Ford requested Trumbull's resignation after he criticized Ford's position on the State Bank of Illinois. In 1842, the Bank had suspended payments after the value of its notes had fallen to fifty cents on the dollar, and Trumbull considered repeated efforts to legalize the suspension futile and disgraceful. Instead, and contrary to Ford's stated policy, Trumbull called for immediate liquidation of the Bank. His resignation divided the Illinois Democratic Party, with the Trumbull faction including Virgil Hickox, Samuel H. Treat, Ebenezer Peck, and Mason Brayman. Trumbull then returned to Belleville to practice law and marry Julia Jayne, a physician's daughter and a friend of Mary Todd Lincoln.

In his private legal practice, Trumbull won a major victory for the abolitionist cause. In 1842, Trumbull and Gustav Koerner argued the case of Sarah Borders, a woman held under the state's indenture law in Randolph County, before the state supreme court. Trumbull and Koerner argued that slavery had been banned in the state since the Northwest Ordinance of 1787. They lost their appeal, but shortly thereafter, Trumbull argued on appeal for the plaintiff in Jarrot v. Jarrot, in which an enslaved man, Joseph Jarrot, sued for wages by alleging that he had been held in servitude contrary to Illinois law. In this case, the supreme court accepted Trumbull's argument that no person could be held as a slave in the state of Illinois. The Jarrot decision, which de facto abolished slavery in the state, established Trumbull as the leading abolitionist attorney in the state.

In February 1846, Trumbull was a candidate for Governor of Illinois at the Democratic state convention. On the first ballot, he received the most votes but fell short of a majority, and the nomination was given to Augustus C. French. Trumbull attributed his defeat to Governor Ford, who favored John Calhoun of Chicago. On the second ballot, Calhoun's delegates voted for French to defeat Trumbull. Instead, Trumbull was nominated for U.S. Representative, but he lost the general election. In 1848, he was elected to the Supreme Court of Illinois, serving until 1853. In 1852, he was re-elected without an opponent.

== United States Senator (1855–73) ==
=== 1854 U.S. House election ===
Following the passage of the Kansas–Nebraska Act in 1854, Trumbull, Gustav Koerner (now Lieutenant Governor), and other anti-slavery Democrats began organizing an anti-Nebraska ticket in the 8th congressional district. The district, which was the state's most Democratic, was situated in the South Central region and centered on St. Clair County. Although the region had historically been a slaveholding region, a large number of German immigrants following the failed revolutions of 1848 had settled in St. Clair County. Against the chaotic backdrop of the Kansas–Nebraska debate, neither the Democratic nor Whig parties made formal nominations. Trumbull ran as an anti-Nebraska Democrat, and defeated Philip B. Fouke, a pro-Nebraska Democrat.

=== 1855 U.S. Senate election ===
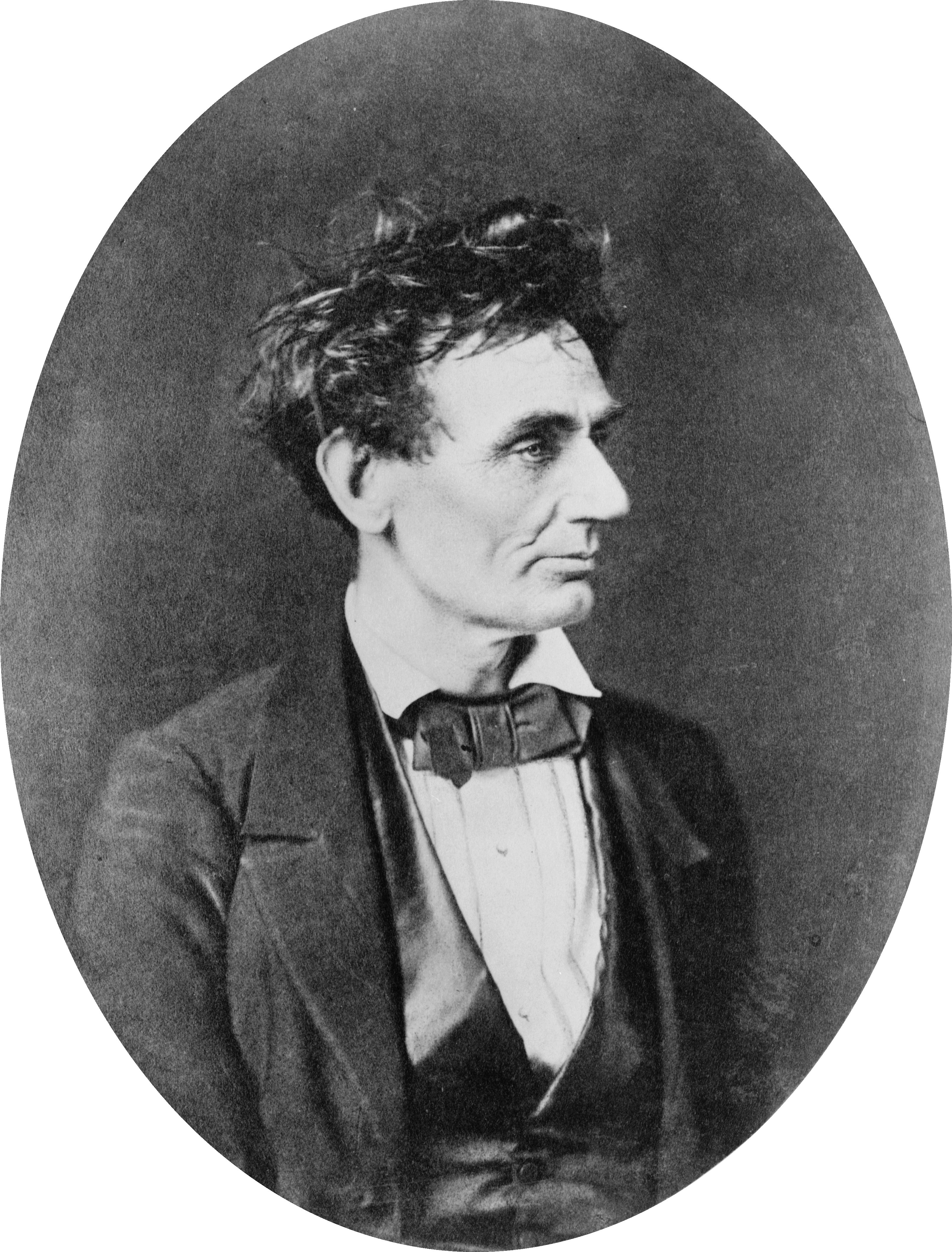
In 1855, Trumbull overcame Abraham Lincoln to win his first election as United States Senator. Lincoln endorsed Trumbull for the seat, and they became allies and co-leaders of the new Republican Party of Illinois.

The 1854 elections in Illinois were a crushing defeat for supporters of the Kansas–Nebraska Act and Senator Stephen A. Douglas. With overwhelming numbers in the state legislature, anti-Nebraska men were positioned to elect a new United States Senator to succeed James Shields, whose term expired in 1855. Abraham Lincoln, an ardent moderate critic of Douglas and the Act, was an early candidate for the seat. In a speech on October 16, 1854, Lincoln delivered a moral, legal, economic, and historical case against slavery which won him the endorsement of many anti-slavery members of the upcoming Illinois legislature, including Owen Lovejoy and John A. Logan. The Senate was to consist of nine Whigs, thirteen regular Democrats, and three anti-Nebraska Democrats allied with Trumbull. The House was composed of forty-six anti-Nebraska men and twenty-eight Democrats.

The election was initially contested between Shields, Lincoln, and Trumbull. On the first ballot, Trumbull received only five votes. After the sixth ballot, Democrats swapped Shields for Governor Joel Aldrich Matteson, who had not actively supported the Nebraska bill. Trumbull had still not yet received more than eleven votes. On the ninth and tenth ballots, Matteson came within three votes of a majority, while Trumbull passed Lincoln. After the tenth ballot, Lincoln asked his supporters to vote for Trumbull to prevent a Matteson victory, and Trumbull won a majority by a single vote. At a reception later that night, Lincoln congratulated Trumbull on his victory.

When he entered the Senate in December 1855, Trumbull's credentials were challenged by Senator Lewis Cass of Michigan, who argued (on behalf of some Illinois legislators) that Trumbull was not eligible to be elected under the Illinois State Constitution, which barred state judges from holding any other office. On March 5, 1856, Trumbull was seated by a vote of 35 to 8.

=== Antebellum period (1855–61) ===
==== Debate with Stephen A. Douglas and switch to Republican Party ====
On March 12, 1856, Trumbull delivered a speech in the Senate on the civil violence in Kansas. In it, he criticized the majority report of the Committee on Territories, submitted by his Illinois colleague Stephen A. Douglas, which defended the actions of "border ruffians" against claims of electoral fraud. The speech sparked a debate between the two, in which Douglas said Trumbull's claim to be a member of the Democratic Party was a "libel" and that his junior colleague had been elected by "Black Republicans," "Know-Nothings," and "Abolitionists." The Trumbull-Douglas debate lasted into the summer, and further established Trumbull's position as a leading force in anti-slavery politics. His speeches won praise from his colleagues Charles Sumner and Salmon P. Chase and served to dispel doubts from anti-slavery Lincoln men in Illinois.

In June 1856, at Lincoln's urging, Trumbull attended the first Republican National Convention in Philadelphia. Trumbull and Lincoln agreed to promote a conservative candidate for the presidential nomination, but it went to the more radical John C. Frémont, who had faint hope of victory. After the convention, Lincoln and Trumbull turned their focus to electing a Republican ticket in Illinois, and they were successful despite Frémont's failure to carry the state. As the debate over the Kansas Territory progressed to its admission as a slave or a free state, Trumbull and Lincoln were joined by Douglas in opposition to the so-called Lecompton Constitution, which guaranteed the property rights of slaveholders in the new state. In a speech on the Lecompton Constitution, Trumbull further argued that the Dred Scott decision, which offered a decision on an issue not before the court, was an illegitimate usurpation by the Supreme Court. Trumbull also contributed $2 to a fund to defray Dred Scott's legal fees.

==== Lincoln-Douglas campaign of 1858 and presidential election of 1860 ====
Despite Douglas's apparent volte-face on slavery in Kansas, which won him support from several Republicans in Congress, Trumbull and Lincoln resolved to unseat him in the 1858 elections. Trumbull took an active part in the strenuous campaign, calculated to exploit Douglas's poor health and reputation for inconsistency. Some themes of Trumbull's 1856 Senate debates with Douglas formed the bases for Lincoln's arguments, including the question which elicited Douglas's famous Freeport Doctrine. On August 7 in Chicago, Trumbull addressed accusations that the Republican Party stood for racial equality by stating, "We, the Republican Party, are the white man's party. We are for free white men and for making white labor respectable and honorable, which it can never be when negro slave labor is brought into competition with it". After Lincoln narrowly lost the election to Douglas, he reassured Trumbull that he would not seek the other Senate seat in 1860, writing, "I cannot conceive it possible for me to be a rival of yours or to take sides against you in favor of any rival."

Despite his loss, Lincoln's effective campaign and an 1860 speech at the Cooper Union Institute raised his national profile, and he was put forward as the favorite son of Illinois for the upcoming 1860 Republican National Convention. Trumbull and Lincoln both believed William H. Seward, the leading Republican candidate, was too radical to carry Illinois, and they searched together for a conservative Republican who could carry their home state. Several options, including John McLean, Nathaniel Banks, and Edward Bates were considered but ruled out. Instead, Lincoln himself gained the support of Indiana and Pennsylvania at the convention, followed by New England, to secure his own nomination for the presidency. In the fall, Lincoln carried the state of Illinois against Douglas and won the presidency against a divided opposition, while Trumbull ensured his own re-election to the Senate by a single legislative seat. Following their successes, Lincoln wrote to Trumbull, advising him to resist calls to compromise with the South on the extension of slavery in order to stave off growing threats of secession. Consistent with that position, Trumbull delivered a speech in the Senate opposing the Crittenden Compromise.

As a top Lincoln ally, Trumbull fielded many calls from office seekers after the election, hoping to win his favor and an appointment from the new president. Trumbull advised Lincoln, both personally and in his capacity as Senator, on appointments in Illinois and to his cabinet. Trumbull advised against the appointment of Simon Cameron as Secretary of War, which ultimately ended in scandal for the Lincoln administration. Trumbull's and Lincoln's Illinois ally Norman B. Judd was appointed envoy to Prussia over Gustav Koerner. At the special session of Congress which Lincoln called on July 4, 1861, to address the secession crisis, Trumbull was elected by his fellow senators as chair of the Committee on the Judiciary, a role he would hold for the remainder of his years in the Senate.

=== Civil War (1861–65) ===
==== Confiscation Acts of 1861 and 1862 ====
As war broke out during the emergency session of Congress, Trumbull introduced only one successful piece of legislation, the Confiscation Act of 1861. This Act to permit the seizure of contraband used in rebellion was drafted by Trumbull to include persons held in slavery employed in military or naval work against the Union war effort. It was the first step toward eventual universal emancipation.

A second Confiscation Act was introduced in December 1861 as a reaction to the stated policies of several rogue generals and military officials, including Frémont, Secretary Cameron, and David Hunter, who sought to establish universal emancipation through their military authority and whose orders were reversed by President Lincoln. As drafted by Trumbull, the initial bill provided that all property held by rebels was immediately forfeited to the United States but preserved the rights of Southern citizens who claimed loyalty to the Union. Trumbull's bill explicitly denied military officers the right to adjudicate claims, instead requiring them to accept any claim of loyalty as valid. The bill was amended by Senator Jacob Collamer to provide for due process of law. President Lincoln still initially intended to veto the bill under the belief that permanent forfeitures constituted a violation of the Constitution's bar on perpetual punishment of treason, but he was convinced to sign it by Senator Ira Harris of New York, and it became law. Ultimately, the Second Confiscation Act was never enforced except as it applied to slavery, where it served as the legal basis for the Emancipation Proclamation of 1862.

==== Criticisms of wartime policy and 1864 election ====
Trumbull remained a loyal supporter of the Union war effort throughout the Civil War. However, he publicly opposed allegedly excessive or unconstitutional wartime policies, including some Copperhead arrests pursuant to the suspension of the writ of habeas corpus, the suppression of the Chicago Times, and alleged corruption in the Department of War. In 1863, following the Union defeat at Fredericksburg, Trumbull was one of a committee of Republican Senators who requested the resignation of Secretary Seward after private comments Seward had made earlier in the war, criticizing the "most vehement opponents" of slavery, were leaked. Lincoln rejected their accusations and their efforts to attribute military inefficiency to Seward.

As the war effort stalled in January and February 1864, Trumbull became estranged from Lincoln politically and began to privately predict the President would fail to be reelected or even nominated by the Republican Party. Despite his initial misgivings, Trumbull delivered speeches in favor of Lincoln's reelection in October.

==== Thirteenth Amendment to the United States Constitution ====
Because the Confiscation Acts were justified by the President's power to prosecute war, Lincoln's 1862 emancipation order did not extend to slavery in states which remained loyal to the Union or beyond the war's end. Proposals to ban slavery permanently by constitutional amendment were offered throughout the war and referred to the Judiciary committee. In January 1864, Senator John B. Henderson of Missouri, himself a slave holder, proposed a resolution amending the Constitution to include, "Slavery or involuntary servitude, except as a punishment for crime, shall not exist in the United States." On February 10, Trumbull reported out a version of the Henderson resolution which more closely adopted the language of the Northwest Ordinance:

Section 1. Neither slavery nor involuntary servitude, except as punishment for crime whereof the party shall have been duly convicted, shall exist within the United States or any place subject to their jurisdiction. Section 2. Congress shall have power to enforce this article by appropriate legislation.

Trumbull spoke at length in its favor, arguing there could be no doubt that the Civil War originated in the institution of slavery and the hostilities between its proponents and opponents. Therefore, he argued, the amendment was proposed to permanently remove all doubt as to the illegitimacy of slavery. In the same speech, Trumbull made his private criticisms of the Lincoln administration public, focusing on the conduct of General-in-Chief Henry Halleck. The amendment passed the Senate easily on April 8, 1864, but it was stalled in the House until February 1, 1865. Section 2 was the subject of significant controversy and negotiation with Southern legislatures, but the amendment was ultimately ratified by the requisite number of state legislatures in December.

=== Reconstruction and break with Republican Party (1865–73) ===
As the Civil War came to a close, Trumbull opposed the radical "state suicide" theory of reconstruction advanced by Charles Sumner, which held that the seceded states had ceased to exist and therefore should be administered by Congress as territories under the Constitution. Instead, Trumbull favored the unconditional restoration of all states which could elect loyally unionist governments, consistent with President Lincoln's ten percent plan and as modeled by the readmitted state of Louisiana.

However, Trumbull did join the radical Republicans in arguing that under an expansive reading of the Thirteenth Amendment, Congress could bar laws and practices, including sharecropping or racial discrimination, which amounted to or threatened the reintroduction of slavery.

==== Civil Rights Act of 1866 and Fourteenth Amendment to the United States Constitution ====
On January 5, 1866, Trumbull introduced two major pieces of Reconstruction legislation: the Second Freedman's Bureau Act and the Civil Rights Act of 1866.

Trumbull's Freedman's Bureau bill, expand the authority of the Freedman's Bureau and provided for the temporary reassignment of abandoned lands to freed slaves. The bill was vetoed by Johnson.

The Civil Rights bill was proposed in response to a growing number of discriminatory "black codes" which sought to restrict the civil liberties of the newly emancipated and compel them to work for little or no wages. Trumbull's bill proposed citizenship be extended to all persons of African descent born in the United States and banned discrimination on account of race, color, or previous condition of slavery. Debate over the bill focused on whether Congress had constitutional authority to pass the law, which Trumbull justified under Section 2 of the newly ratified Thirteenth Amendment, arguing:

[Congress has] a right to pass any law which, in our judgment, is deemed appropriate, and which will accomplish the end in view, secure freedom to all people in the United States. The various state laws to which I have referred, — and there are many others, — although they do not make a man an absolute slave, yet deprive him of the rights of a freeman; and it is perhaps difficult to draw the precise line, to say where freedom ceases and slavery begins, but a law that does not allow a colored person to go from one county to another is certainly a law in derogation of the rights of a freeman. A law that does not allow a colored person to hold property, does not allow him to teach, does not allow him to preach, is certainly a law in violation of the rights of a freeman, and being so may properly be declared void.

Though the Civil Rights bill passed both houses of Congress easily, it too was vetoed by Johnson. In a response to Johnson's veto, Trumbull concluded by saying, "If the bill now before us... cannot be passed, then the constitutional amendment proclaiming freedom to all the inhabitants of the land is a cheat and a delusion." Both houses overrode Johnson's veto in April 1866, the first override of a presidential veto of major legislation in United States history. Despite this legislative success, some Republicans still feared that Congress lacked the constitutionality authority to pass the Civil Rights Act and that it would be repealed by a subsequent Democratic Congress. Parallel to the debate over its passage, Congress debated a constitutional amendment to ensure citizenship and civil rights against discrimination on the basis of race. A concurrent resolution requesting the President to transmit the proposed amendment to the governors of the states was passed by both houses of Congress on June 18, 1866. The Fourteenth Amendment to the Constitution was ratified in 1868, after ratification was made a precondition for readmission by the seceded states.

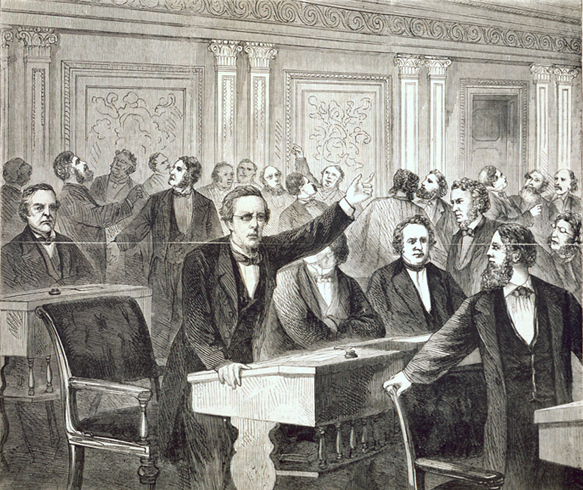
Illustration of Senator Trumbull motioning on May 6, 1868, for the arrest of disorderly spectators at the impeachment trial of Andrew Johnson

==== Impeachment of Andrew Johnson ====
During President Andrew Johnson's impeachment trial, Trumbull was one of seven Republican senators disturbed by their belief that Thaddeus Stevens and Benjamin Wade and those of similar position had manipulated the proceedings against Johnson in order to give a one-sided presentation of the evidence. Trumbull in particular noted:

Once set the example of impeaching a President for what, when the excitement of the hour shall have subsided, will be regarded as insufficient causes, as several of those now alleged against the President were decided to be by the House of Representatives only a few months since, and no future President will be safe who happens to differ with a majority of the House and two-thirds of the Senate on any measure deemed by them important, particularly if of a political character. Blinded by partisan zeal, with such an example before them, they will not scruple to remove out of the way any obstacle to the accomplishment of their purposes, and what then becomes of the checks and balances of the Constitution, so carefully devised and so vital to its perpetuity? They are all gone.

All seven senators, resisting the pressure imposed on them, broke party ranks and defied public opinion, voting for acquittal, although they knew their decision would be unpopular. In addition, they were joined by three other Republican senators (James Dixon, James Rood Doolittle, Daniel Sheldon Norton) and all nine Democrats in voting against conviction. None of the Republicans who voted against conviction were reelected (though it should be pointed out that Senators at that time were not subject to popular vote but rather were chosen by the state Legislatures prior to ratification of the 17th Amendment - and thus the whim of the Party in power in said Legislatures). After the trial, Congressman Benjamin Butler of Massachusetts conducted hearings in the House on widespread reports that Republican senators had been bribed to vote for Johnson's acquittal. Butler's hearings and subsequent inquiries revealed evidence that some acquittal votes were acquired by promises of patronage jobs and cash cards.

== Post-Senate career ==
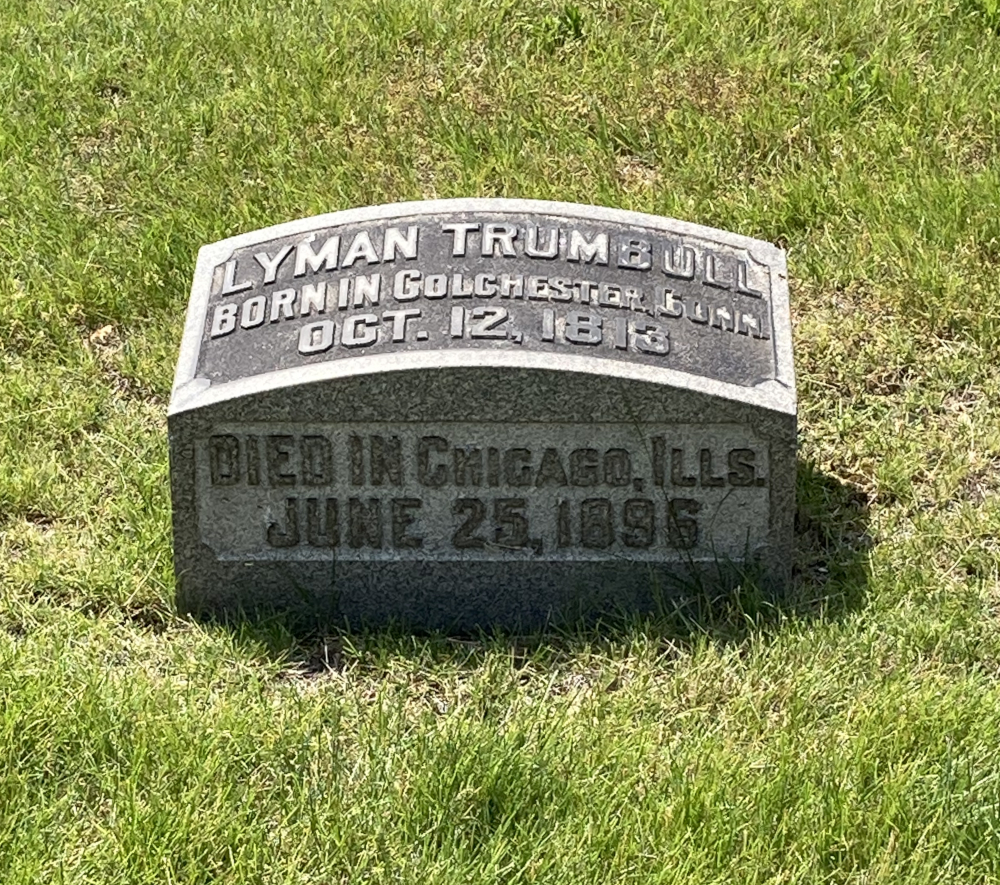
Trumbull's grave at Oak Woods Cemetery

After leaving the Senate in 1873, Trumbull set up a law practice in Chicago. He worked in private practice except for a brief period when he ran an unsuccessful campaign for governor (as a Democrat) in 1880. In January 1883, Trumbull was given a seat of honor at the dedication of the Pullman Arcade Theatre in George Pullman's company town.

He became a Populist in 1894. According to Almont Lindsey's 1942 book, The Pullman Strike, Trumbull took part in defending Eugene Debs and other labor leaders of the American Railway Union, who had been convicted for violating a federal court injunction during the 1894 Pullman railroad strike. Trumbull was part of the three-member legal team, which included Clarence Darrow, when their habeas corpus case In re Debs was heard by the US Supreme Court in 1895.

Trumbull died at his home in Chicago on June 25, 1896, and was buried at Oak Woods Cemetery.

== Personal life ==
Trumbull married Julia M. Jayne on June 21, 1843. Jayne, the daughter of a prominent Springfield physician, had been a bridesmaid in the wedding of Mary Todd and Abraham Lincoln the prior November. At the Trumbull wedding, Norman B. Judd served as groomsman. Their marriage lasted twenty-four years.

Their son, Walter Trumbull, was a member of the Washburn–Langford–Doane Expedition to survey what is now Yellowstone National Park. In 1871, Senator Trumbull spoke in favor of the establishment of the Park and in favor of the preservation of natural beauty against the threat of private ownership.

== Memorials ==
During his explorations in the west John Wesley Powell named Mt. Trumbull (and now the Mt. Trumbull Wilderness) in northwestern Arizona after the Senator. His house in Alton, the Lyman Trumbull House, is a National Historic Landmark. Trumbull has a street named after him in the city of Chicago; Lyman Trumbull Elementary School in Chicago was named after the Senator. Trumbull Park and adjacent Trumbull Park Homes in Chicago are named after the Senator.

== See also ==
- List of American politicians who switched parties in office
- List of United States representatives-elect who never took their seats

Political offices
Preceded by Stephen A. Douglas	Secretary of State of Illinois; 1841–1843	Succeeded by Thompson Campbell
U.S. House of Representatives
Preceded by William Bissell	Member-elect to the U.S. House of Representatives from Illinois's 8th congressional district 1854	Succeeded by James Morrison
U.S. Senate
Preceded by James Shields	U.S. Senator (Class 3) from Illinois; 1855–1873; Served alongside: Stephen A. Douglas, Orville H. Browning, William Richardson, Richard Yates, John A. Logan	Succeeded by Richard Oglesby
Preceded by James A. Bayard Jr.	Chair of the Senate Judiciary Committee; 1861–1873	Succeeded by George G. Wright
Party political offices
Preceded by Lewis Steward	Democratic nominee for Governor of Illinois; 1880	Succeeded by Carter Harrison Sr.
