= Giantess Geyser =

Geyser in Teton County, Wyoming, United States

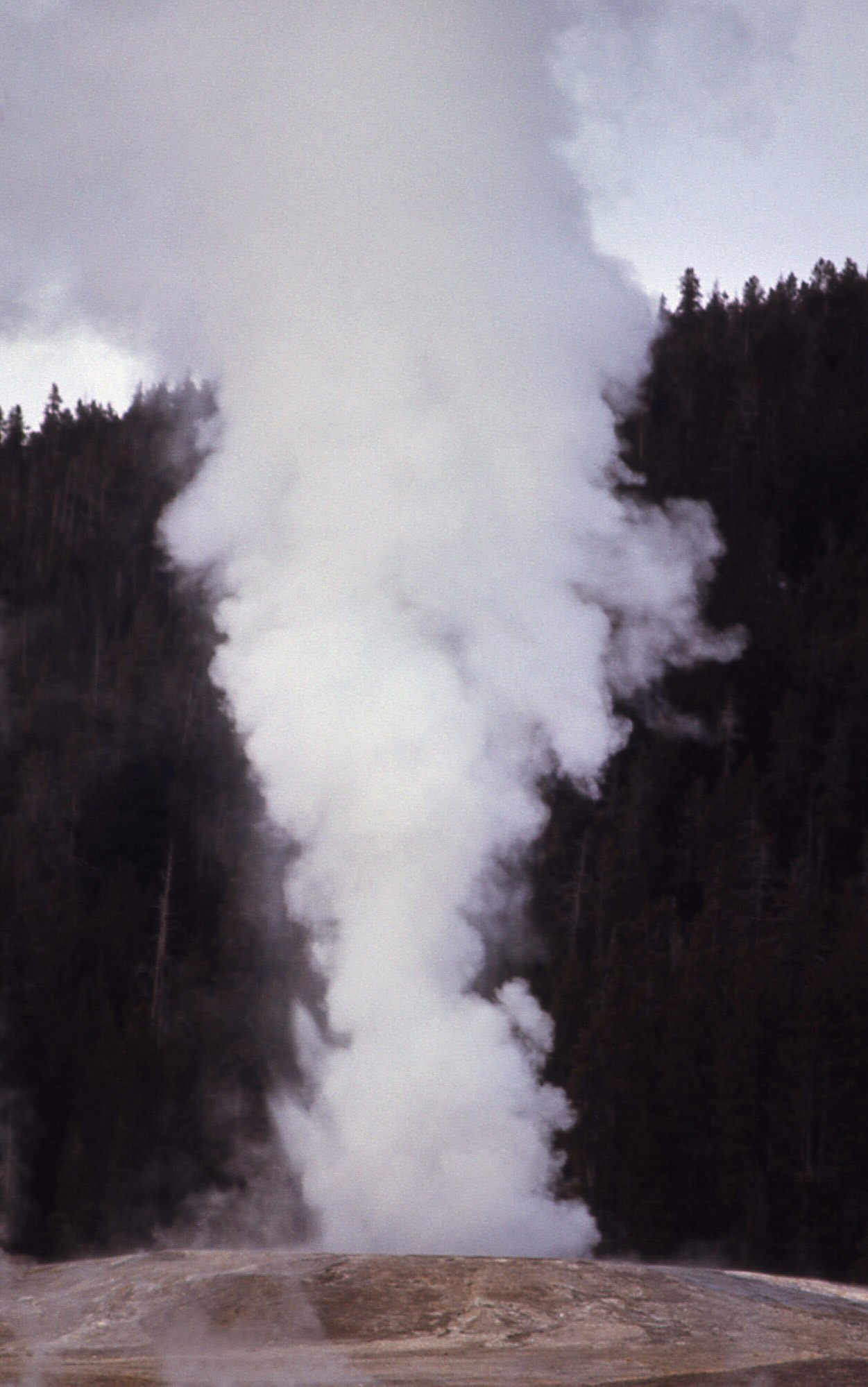
- Giantess Geyser

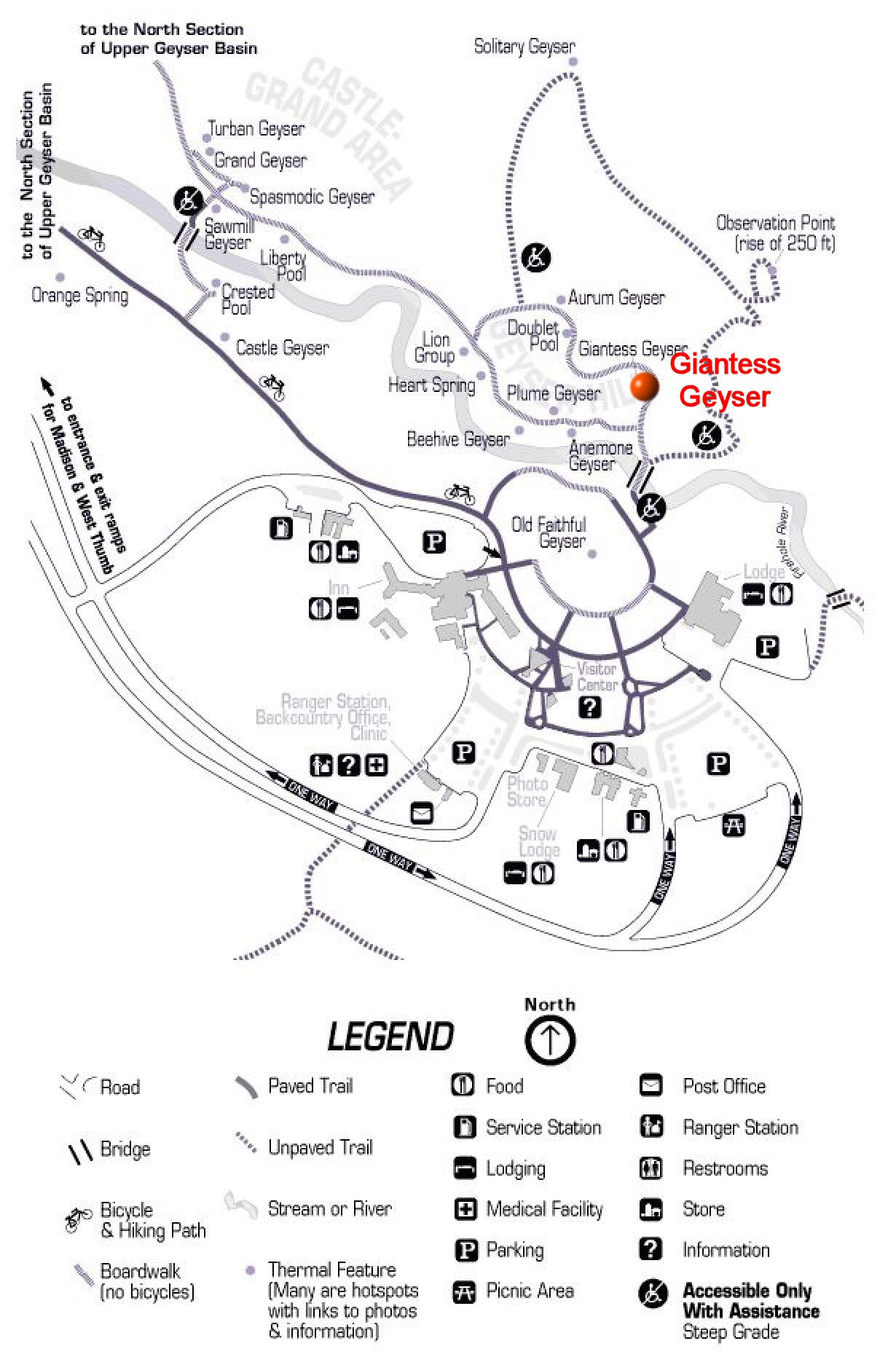
- Upper Geyser Basin
- Location: Upper Geyser Basin, Yellowstone National Park, Teton County, Wyoming
- Coordinates: 44.4635358°N 110.828924°W
- Elevation: 7,428 feet (2,264 m)
- Type: Fountain
- Eruption height: 100 to 200 feet (30 to 61 m)
- Frequency: Infrequent
- Temperature: 90.4 °C (194.7 °F)

Giantess Geyser is a fountain-type geyser in the Upper Geyser Basin of Yellowstone National Park. It is known for its violent and infrequent eruptions of multiple water bursts that reach from 100 to 200 feet (30 to 61 m). Eruptions generally occur 2 to 6 times a year. The surrounding area may shake from underground steam explosions just before the initial water and/or steam eruptions. Eruptions may occur twice hourly, experience a tremendous steam phase, and continue activity for 4 to 48 hours. The Geyser last erupted on August 26, 2020, after a six-year, 210 day hiatus. A follow-up eruption occurred 15 days later on 10 September 2020. Another eruption occurred on 11 August 2021

== History ==
Giantess Geyser was one of the seven geysers named during the Washburn–Langford–Doane Expedition to the park region in 1870. Walter Trumbull, a member of the expedition described Giantess in his diary:

One of the most remarkable geysers was "The Giantess." for yards around the ground rose gradually to its crater, but immediately about it was no formation rising above the surface, as was the case with all the other geysers which we saw in active operation. When quiet, it was a clear, beautiful pool, caught in a subsilica urn, or vase, with a hollow, bottomless stem, through which the steam came bubbling, just like the effervescence of champagne from the bottom of a long, hollow-necked glass. The mouth of the vase, represented by the surface, was twenty feet by thirty; and the neck, fifty feet below, was fifteen feet by ten. The water, at times, retired to the level of the neck, or vent, and at other times rose nearly to the surface. When in action, "The Giantess" became a fountain with five jets, shooting the spray to a height of two hundred feet. At the surface the largest jet was about two feet in diameter, and it kept in solid column for more than a hundred and fifty feet before breaking into drops and spray. It burst forth just before sunset, and the last rays of light gave prismatic tints to the glistening drops, when, having reached their utmost altitude, they trembled at their coming fall. The clouds of steam, which in this, as in all other instances, accompanied the boiling water, became a golden fleece lit up by wreaths of rainbows. Though inferior to "The Giant" in immensity of volume, and perhaps in grandeur, "the Giantess" was by far the most beautiful sight we saw in the geyser basin.

— Walter Trumbull, September 18, 1870

Nathaniel P. Langford in his Diary of the Washburn Expedition to the Yellowstone and Firehole Rivers in the year 1870 described the Giantess thus:

Near by is situated the "Giantess," the largest of all the geysers we saw in eruption. Ascending a gentle slope for a distance of sixty yards we came to a sink or well of an irregular oval shape, fifteen by twenty feet across, into which we could see to the depth of fifty feet or more, but could discover no water, though we could distinctly hear it gurgling and boiling at a fearful rate afar down this vertical cavern. Suddenly it commenced spluttering and rising with incredible rapidity, causing a general stampede among our company, who all moved around to the windward side of the geyser. When the water had risen within about twenty-five feet of the surface, it became stationary, and we returned to look down upon the foaming water, which occasionally emitted hot jets nearly to the mouth of the orifice. As if tired of this sport the water began to ascend at the rate of five feet in a second, and when near the top it was expelled with terrific momentum in a column the full size of the immense aperture to a height of sixty feet. The column remained at this height for the space of about a minute, when from the apex of this vast aqueous mass five lesser jets or round columns of water varying in size from six to fifteen inches in diameter shot up into the atmosphere to the amazing height of two hundred and fifty feet. This was without exception the most magnificent phenomenon I ever beheld. We were standing on the side of the geyser exposed to the sun, whose sparkling rays filled the ponderous column with what appeared to be the clippings of a thousand rainbows. These prismatic illusions disappeared, only to be succeeded by myriads of others which continually fluttered and sparkled through the spray during the twenty minutes the eruption lasted. These lesser jets, thrown so much higher than the main column and shooting through it, doubtless proceed from auxiliary pipes leading into the principal orifice near the bottom, where the explosive force is greater. The minute globules into which the spent column was diffused when falling sparkled like a shower of diamonds, and around every shadow produced by the column of steam hiding the sun was the halo so often represented in paintings as encircling the head of the Savior. We unhesitatingly agreed that this was the greatest wonder of our trip.

— Nathaniel P. Langford, 1905

== Gallery ==
Images of Giantess Geyser
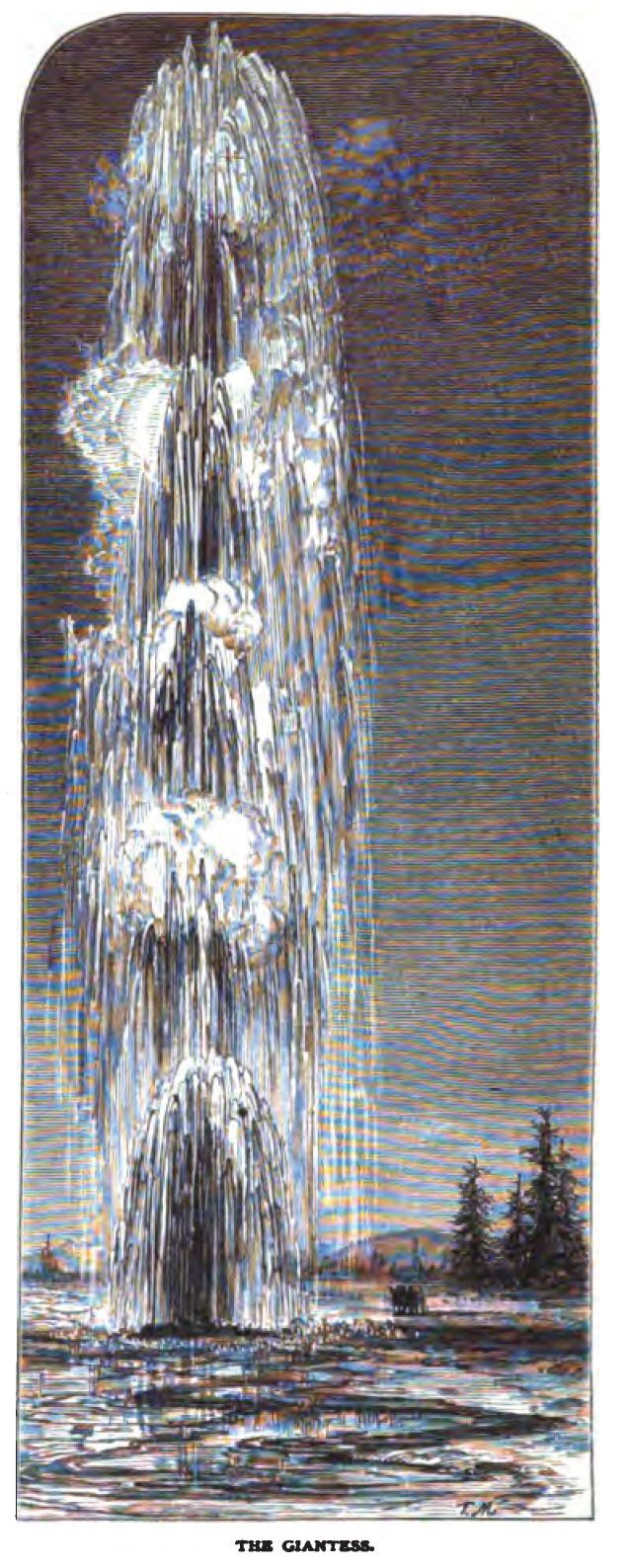
Thomas Moran's illustration from The Wonders of the Yellowstone, 1871

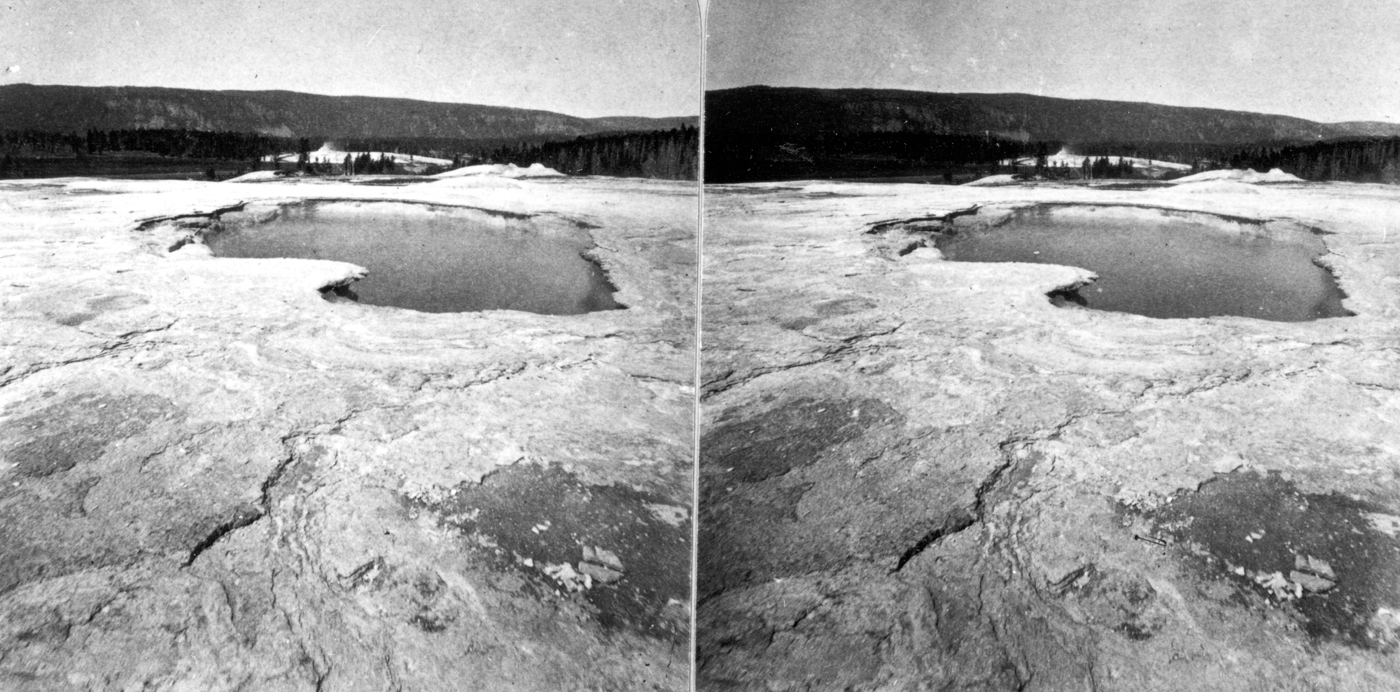
Giantess Geyser Crater, 1872 William Henry Jackson

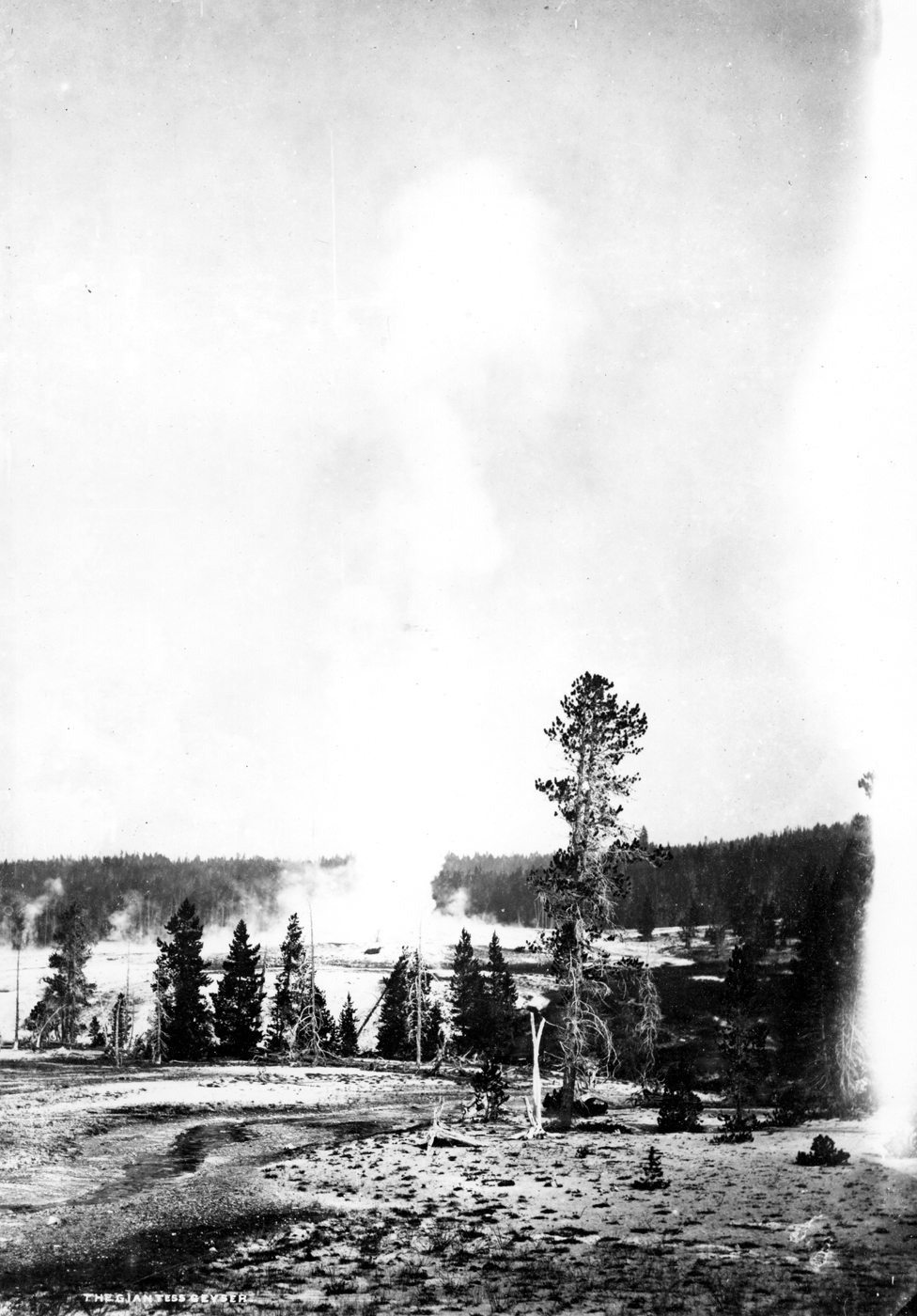
Giantess erupting, 1883 William Henry Jackson

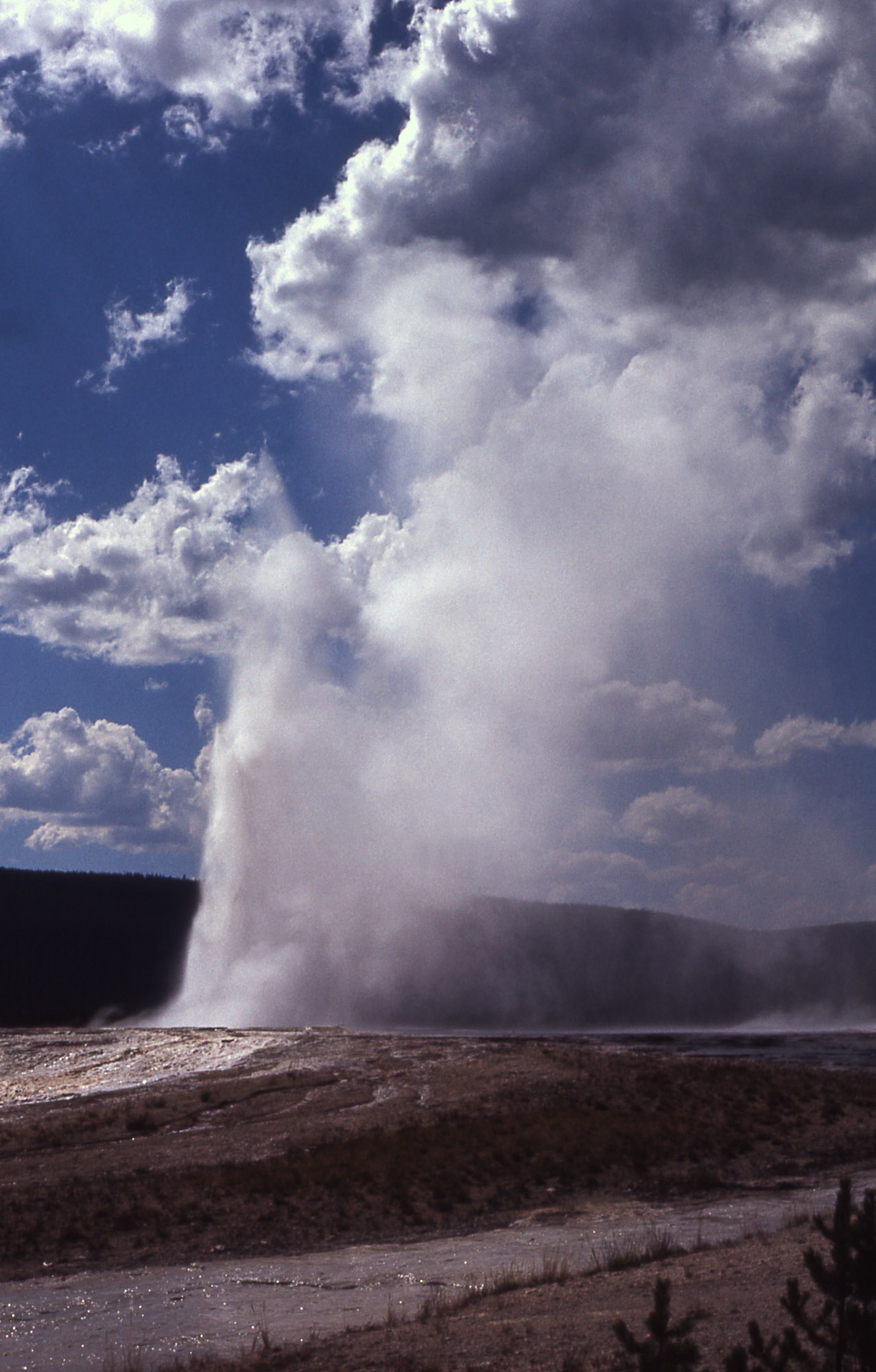
Giantess Geyser, 1970

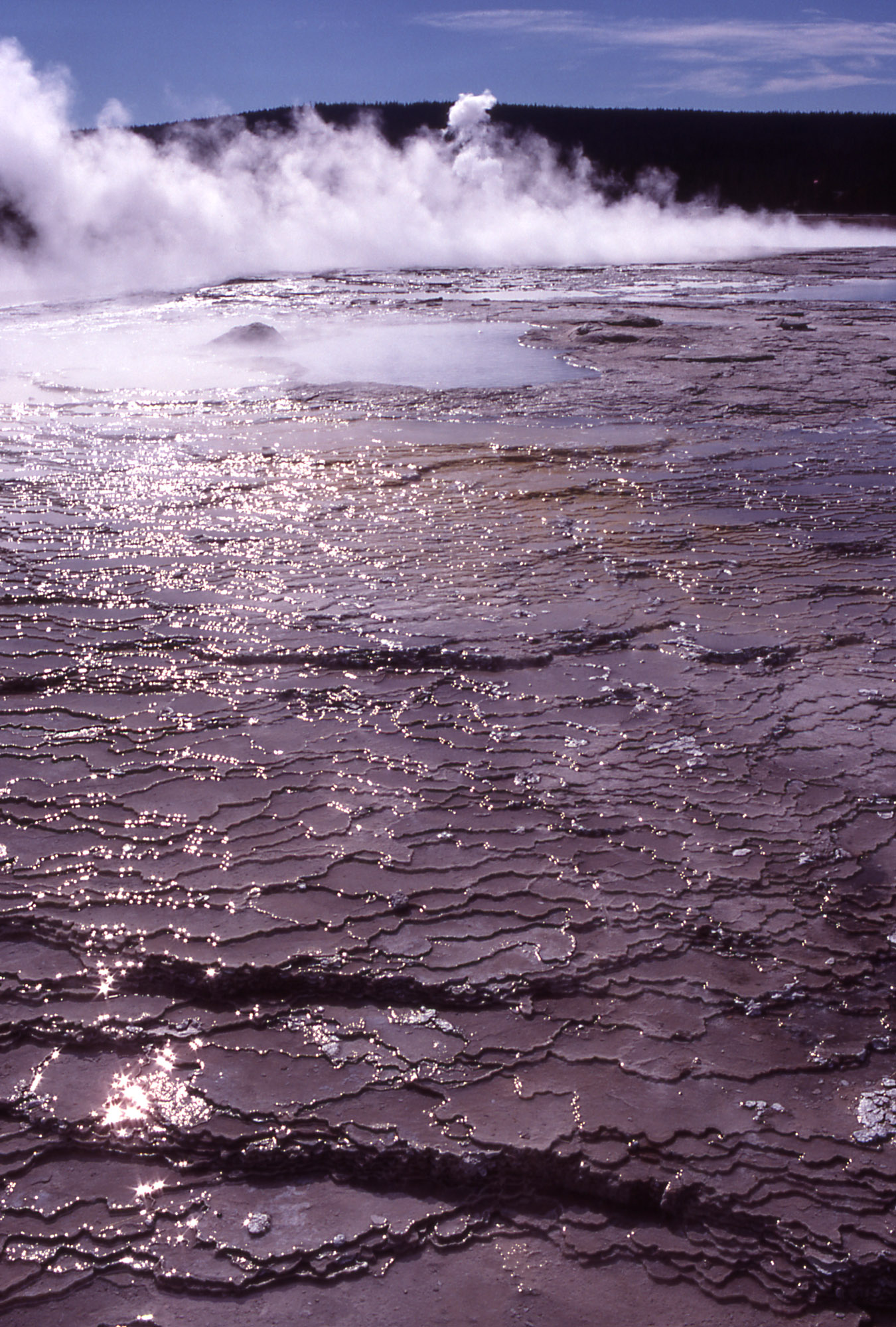
Giantess Geyser terraces, 1977
