= List of city clerks of Chicago =

City Clerk of Chicago
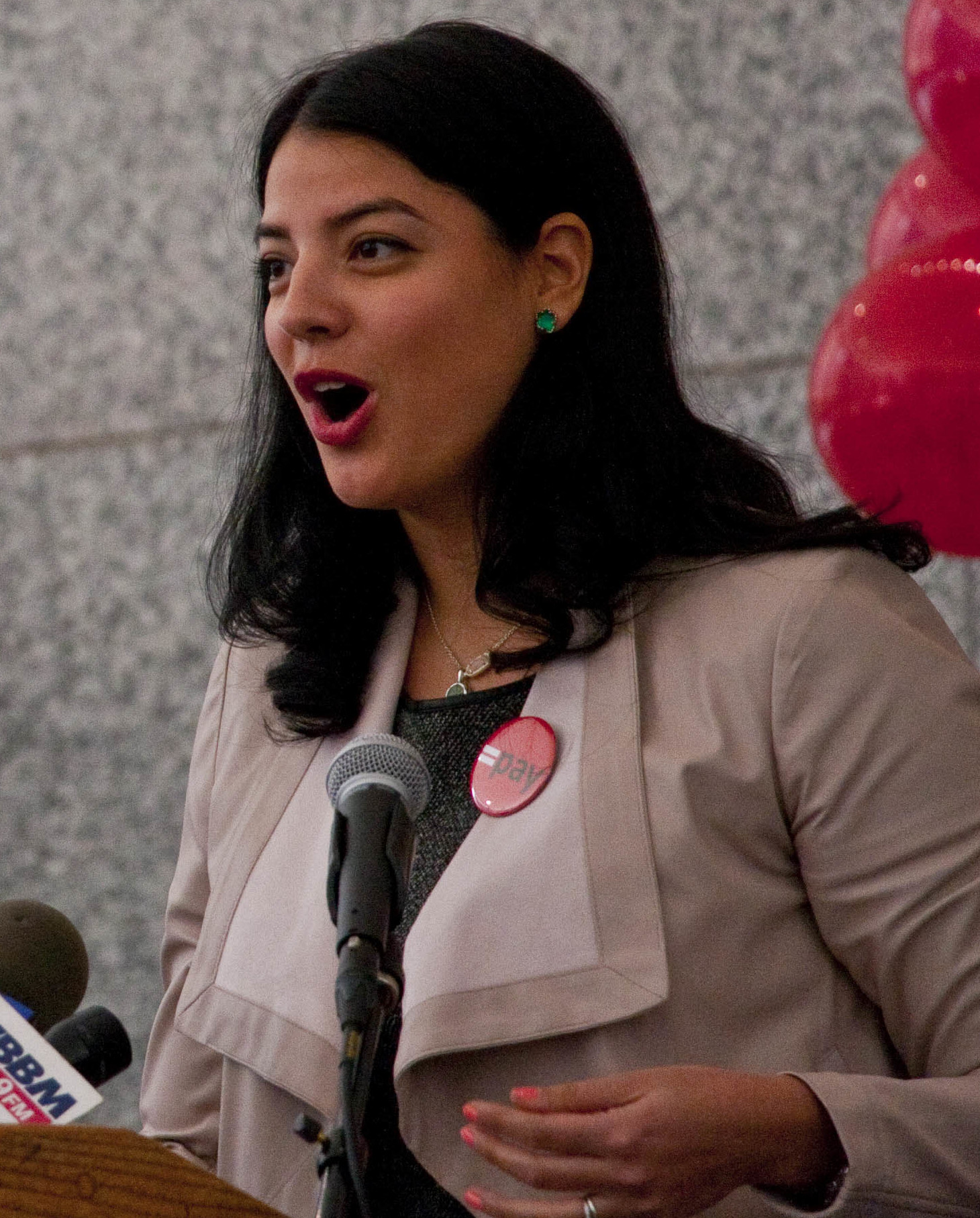
- Incumbent; Anna M. Valencia since January 25, 2017
- Term length: 4 years
- Salary: $136,393
- Website: chicityclerk.com

The city clerk of Chicago is in charge of record-keeping for Chicago, including for its elections, permits, licenses, and laws. When the Chicago City Council is in session, the city clerk also serves as council secretary. The clerk is a citywide elected office, and is one of three city-wide elected officials in the City of Chicago, along with the Mayor and the Treasurer.

The current city clerk is Anna Valencia.

One former city clerk is more famous for his non-political activities: The late Baseball Hall of Famer Cap Anson served one term from 1905-1907.

== Duties ==
The city clerk's office is responsible for maintaining official city government record (such as the Municipal Code of Chicago), distributing approximately 1.3 million vehicle stickers and residential parking permits, and issuing city business licenses.

Significant City Council transparency efforts have included posting nearly 700,000 pages of searchable City Council records to the city clerk website, ChiCityClerk.com. This includes every ordinance passed since 1981, as well as city budgets and mayoral executive orders going back nearly 30 years. In addition, City Council meetings can be watched live or on demand via a City Council video archive on the city clerk's website.

== List of city clerks ==
| City clerks | Term | Notes |
|---|---|---|
| Anna Valencia | 2017- | Appointed in 2017, and elected in 2019. |
| Susana Mendoza | 2011-2016 | Elected in 2011 and 2015. Resigned in 2016 to become the Illinois Comptroller. |
| Miguel del Valle | 2006-2011 | Appointed in 2006, and elected in 2007. Resigned in 2011 to run for Mayor of Chicago. |
| James Laski | 1995-2006 | Elected in 1995, and re-elected in 1999 and 2003. Resigned in 2006 after his indictment for corruption. |
| Ernest Wish | 1993-1995 | Appointed in 1993, and did not seek election to a full term. |
| Walter Kozubowski | 1979-1993 | Elected in 1979, and re-elected in 1983, 1987, and 1991. Resigned in 1993 after pleading guilty to corruption. |
| John C. Marcin | 1955-1979 | Elected in 1955, and re-elected in 1959, 1963, 1967, 1971, and 1975. In 1979, became alderperson for the 35th Ward. |
| Ludwig D. Schreiber | 1939-1955 | Elected in 1939, and re-elected in 1943, 1947, and 1951. |
| Peter J. Brady | 1931-1937 | |
| Patrick S. Smith | 1927-1931 | |
| Al F. Gorman | 1923-1927 | |
| James T. Igoe | 1917-1923 | |
| Joseph Siman | 1917 | |
| John Siman | 1915-1917 | |
| Francis D. Connery | 1909-1915 | He was elected in 1909. His term may have ended in 1915. |
| John R. McCabe | 1907-1909 | |
| Cap Anson | 1905-1907 | |
| Fred C. Bender | 1903-1905 | |
| William Loeffler | 1897-1903 | |
| Charles A. Gastfield | 1893-1895 | |
| James R.B. Van Cleave | 1891-1893 | |
| Franz Amberg | 1889-1891 | |
| D.W. Nickerson | 1887-1889 | |
| C. Herman Plautz | 1885-1887 | |
| John G. Neumeister | 1883-1885 | |
| Patrick J. Howard | 1879-1883 | |
| Caspar Butz | 1876-1879 | |
| Joseph K.C. Forrest | 1873-1875 | |
| Charles T. Hotchkiss | 1869-1873 | |
| Albert H. Bodman | 1865-1869 | |
| A.J. Marble | 1861-1863 | |
| Abraham Kohn | 1860-1861 | |
| H. Kreismann | 1857-1860 | |
| Henry W. Zimmerman | 1851-1857 | |
| Sidney Aboll | 1848-1851 | |
| Henry B. Clarke | 1846-1848 | |
| William S. Brown | 1845-1846 | |
| Edward Rucker | 1844-1845 | |
| James M. Lowe | 1843-1844 | |
| James Curtiss | 1842-1843 | |
| Thomas Hoyne | 1840-1842 | |
| William H. Brackett | 1839-1840 | |
| George Davis | 1837-1839 | |
| Isaac N. Arnold | 1837 | Inaugural city clerk |

=== Town clerks ===
The position of city clerk was preceded by the position of town clerk, which existed after Chicago had been incorporated as a town and before Chicago was incorporated as a city.

| City clerks | Term | Notes |
|---|---|---|
| James Curtiss | 1836-1837 | Became Clerk in September 1836 |
| Ebenezer Peck | 1836 | |
| Charles V. Dyer | 1836 | Resigned immediately after being elected at the June 6, 1936 town election (held at the Tremont House) |
| Ebenezer Peck | 1835 | Coincidingly served as the town's Counsel |
| Alexander N. Fullerton | 1835 | Elected in July 1835 town election |
| Edwards W. Casey | 1834-1835 | Became Clerk in November 1834. Coincidingly served as Corporation Counsel. |
| Isaac Harmon | 1834 | Elected clerk in August 11, 1834 town election. Coincidingly served as Town Collector. |
| H. J. Hamilton | 1833-1834 | |
| E. S. Kimberly | 1833 | Inaugural town clerk |
