= Lyman Trumbull House =

Historic house in Illinois, United States

- U.S. National Register of Historic Places
- U.S. National Historic Landmark
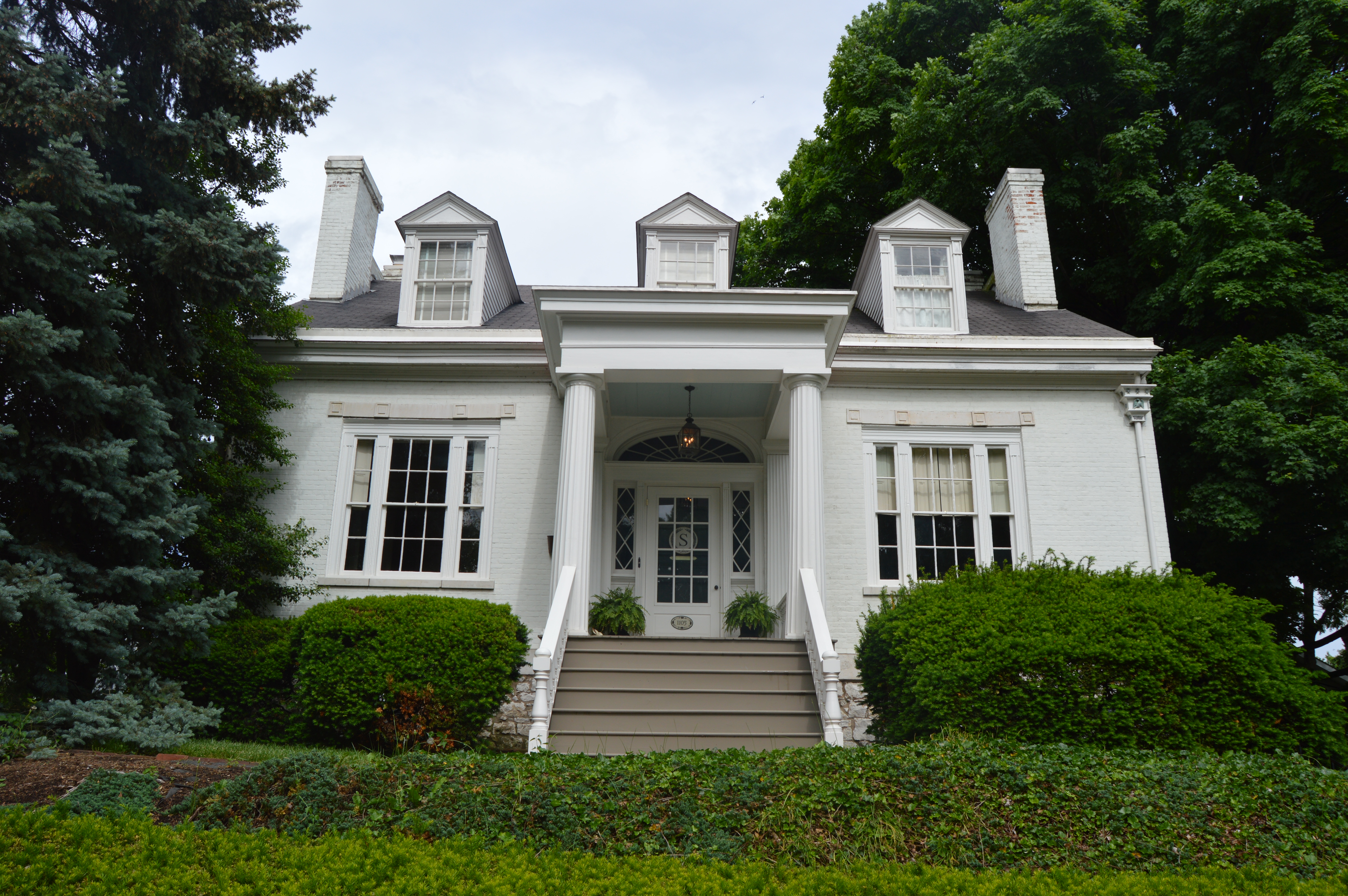
- Front of the house

- Location within Illinois Location within the United States
- Location: 1105 Henry Street, Alton, Illinois
- Coordinates: 38°53′49.44″N 90°10′33″W
- Built: 1849
- NRHP reference No.: 75000667

Significant dates
- Added to NRHP: May 15, 1975
- Designated NHL: May 15, 1975

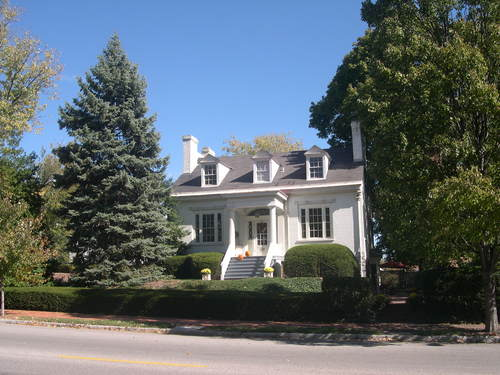
The Lyman Trumbull house located at 1105 Henry Street in the historic Middletown neighborhood of Alton, Illinois

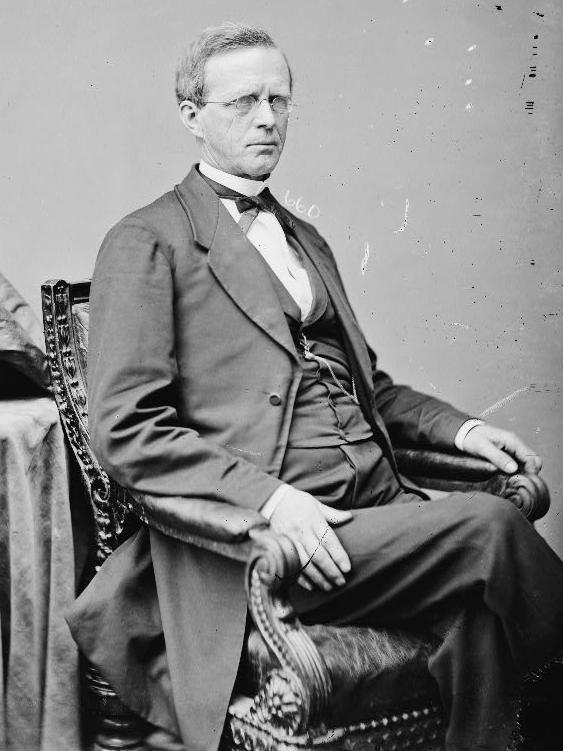
Senator Lyman Trumbull

Lyman Trumbull House is a house significant for its association with former U.S. Senator from Illinois Lyman Trumbull. The house is located in the historic Middletown neighborhood in Alton, Illinois. Senator Trumbull was best known for being a co-author of the Thirteenth Amendment to the United States Constitution.

The house was built around 1849, and was declared a National Historic Landmark in 1975. Senator Trumbull lived in this house from 1849 to 1863, according to the documentation provided in the National Historic Landmark application.

The house is a 1 1/2-story red brick, gable-roofed residence with limestone foundation. It was originally rectangular-shaped, but late in the 19th century an addition was built on the rear of the house, transforming it into an L-shaped residence. There are three gabled dormers protruding from the front roof, one on the rear of the original house, and one on the northern elevation of the roof on the addition.

Adorning the front of the house is a centrally located one-bay entrance porch supported by two fluted pilasters, all made of wood. Turned balusters flank the porch and the several wooden steps that lead to a brick walkway surrounding the dwelling. An entrance to the basement is located underneath the porch. The chief front entrance to the Trumbull House is a single door with side lights and semi-elliptical fanlight. On the south side of the house is a second basement entrance, and it is sheltered by a pedimented portico supported by two Doric columns.
