= Fred C. Bender =

American politician

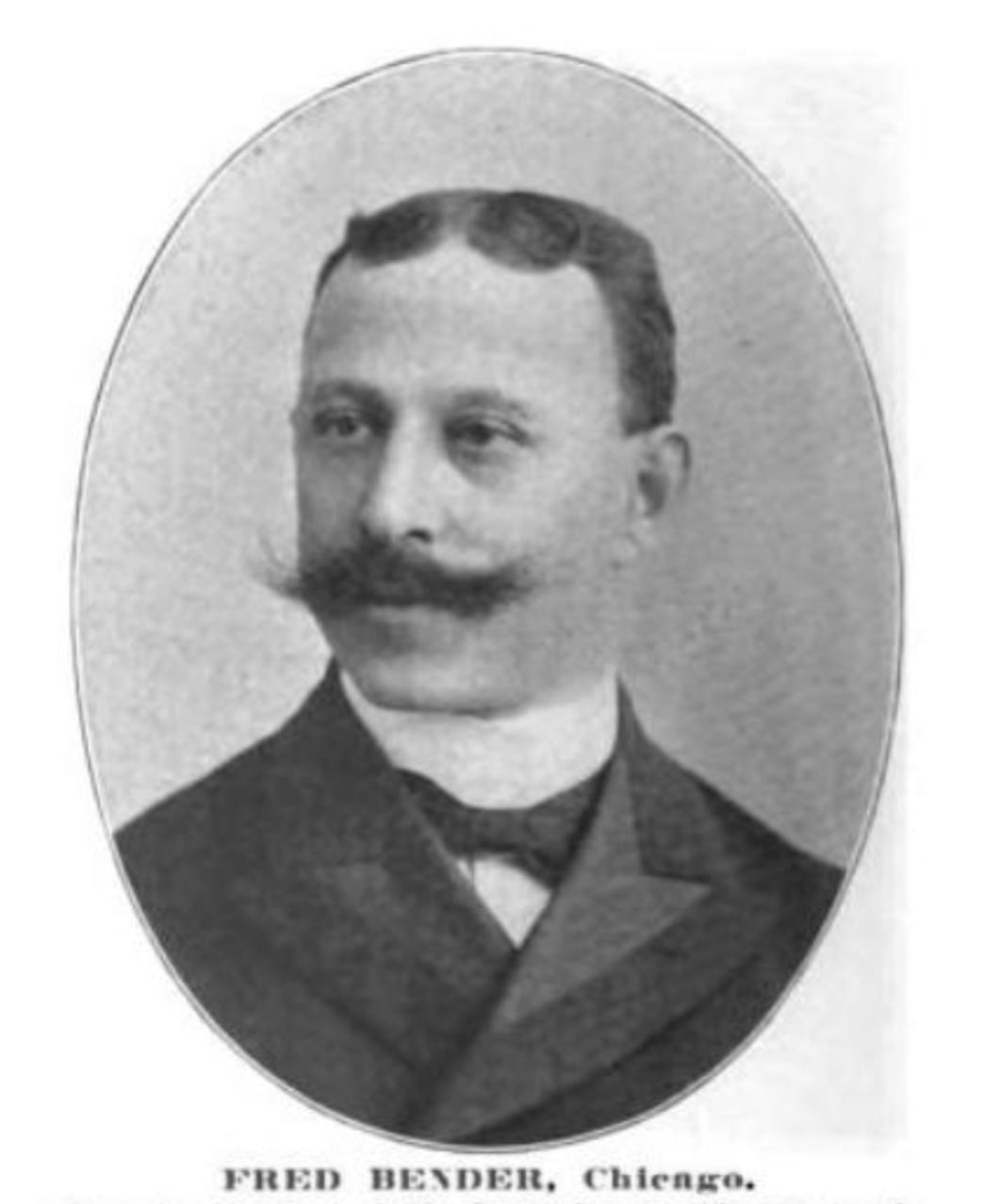

City Clerk of Chicago
- In office 1903–1905
- Preceded by: William Loeffler
- Succeeded by: Cap Anson

Personal details
- Born: 1866
- Died: March 5 1914 Chicago, Illinois, U.S.
- Party: Republican

Fred C. Bender (1866–) was a German-American politician who served as City Clerk of Chicago from 1897 to 1903.
