= Caspar Butz =

American politician

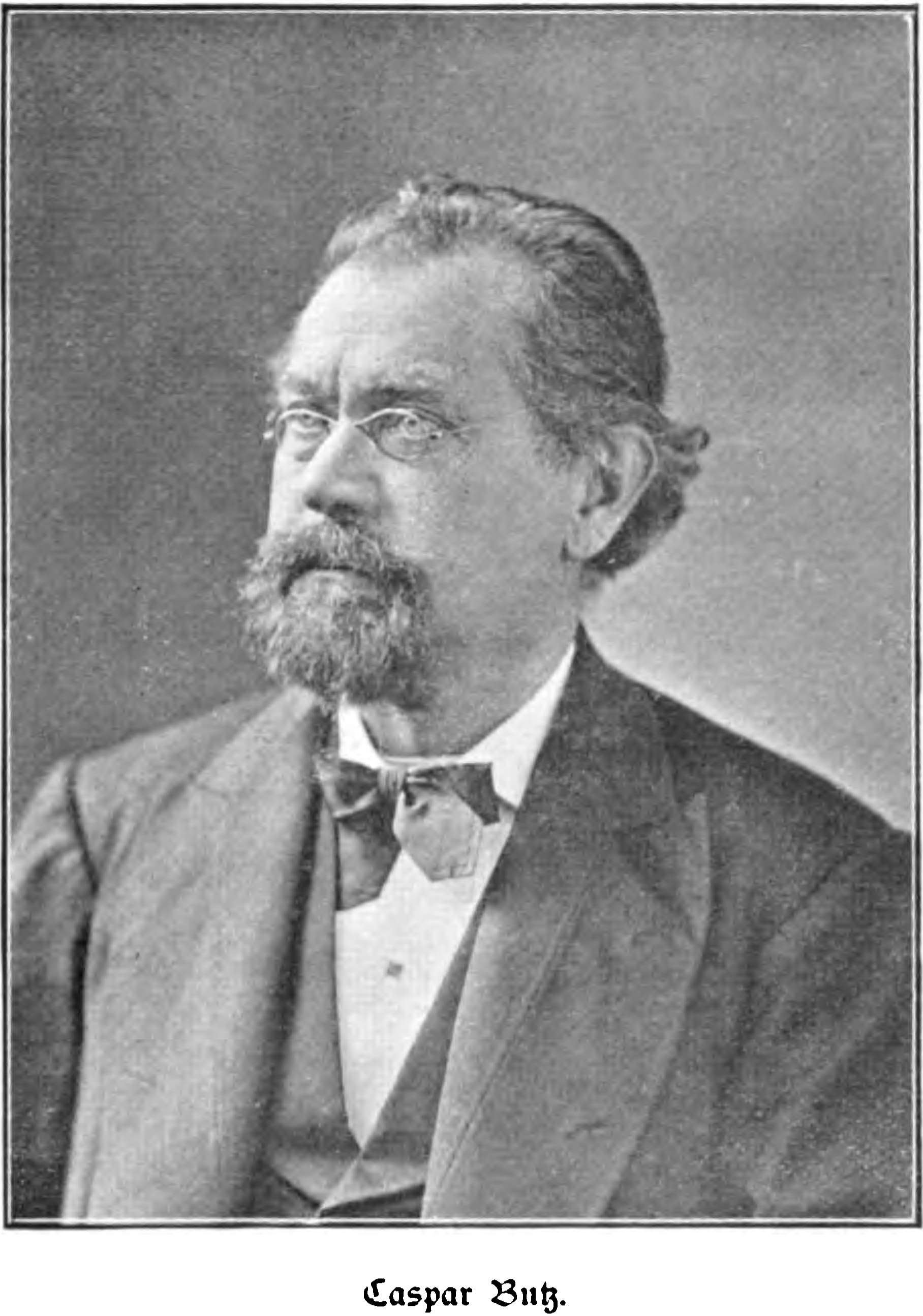

City Clerk of Chicago
- In office 1876–1879
- Preceded by: Joseph K.C. Forrest
- Succeeded by: Patrick J. Howard

Member of the Illinois House of Representatives from the 57th district
- In office 1858–1860 Serving with Ebenezer Peck
- Preceded by: Isaac N. Arnold; A.F.C. Mueller
- Succeeded by: Solomon M. Wilson; Homer Wilmarth

Personal details
- Born: October 23, 1825 Hagen, Kingdom of Prussia
- Died: October 19, 1885 (age 59) Des Moines, Iowa, U.S.
- Party: Republican

Caspar Butz (October 23, 1825 – October 19, 1885) was a German-American journalist and politician, born in Hagen, Kingdom of Prussia, who served as a member of the Illinois House of Representatives from 1858 to 1860 and as City Clerk of Chicago from 1876 to 1879.

== Biography ==
Butz was a Forty Eighter who immigrated to the United States in 1851, settling first in Boston. A journalist by trade, he quickly became politically active and joined the newly created Republican Party, serving as a political writer for both the Frémont and Lincoln campaigns. Butz himself was elected to the Illinois House of Representatives in 1858, where he served alongside Ebenezer Peck as Representative from the 57th District. Butz was actively involved in German language journalism in the United States, and held several positions in a number of publications, including the Illinois Staats-Zeitung and the Michigan Tribune, the latter of which he briefly owned.

Butz died in Des Moines, Iowa in 1885, at the age of 59.

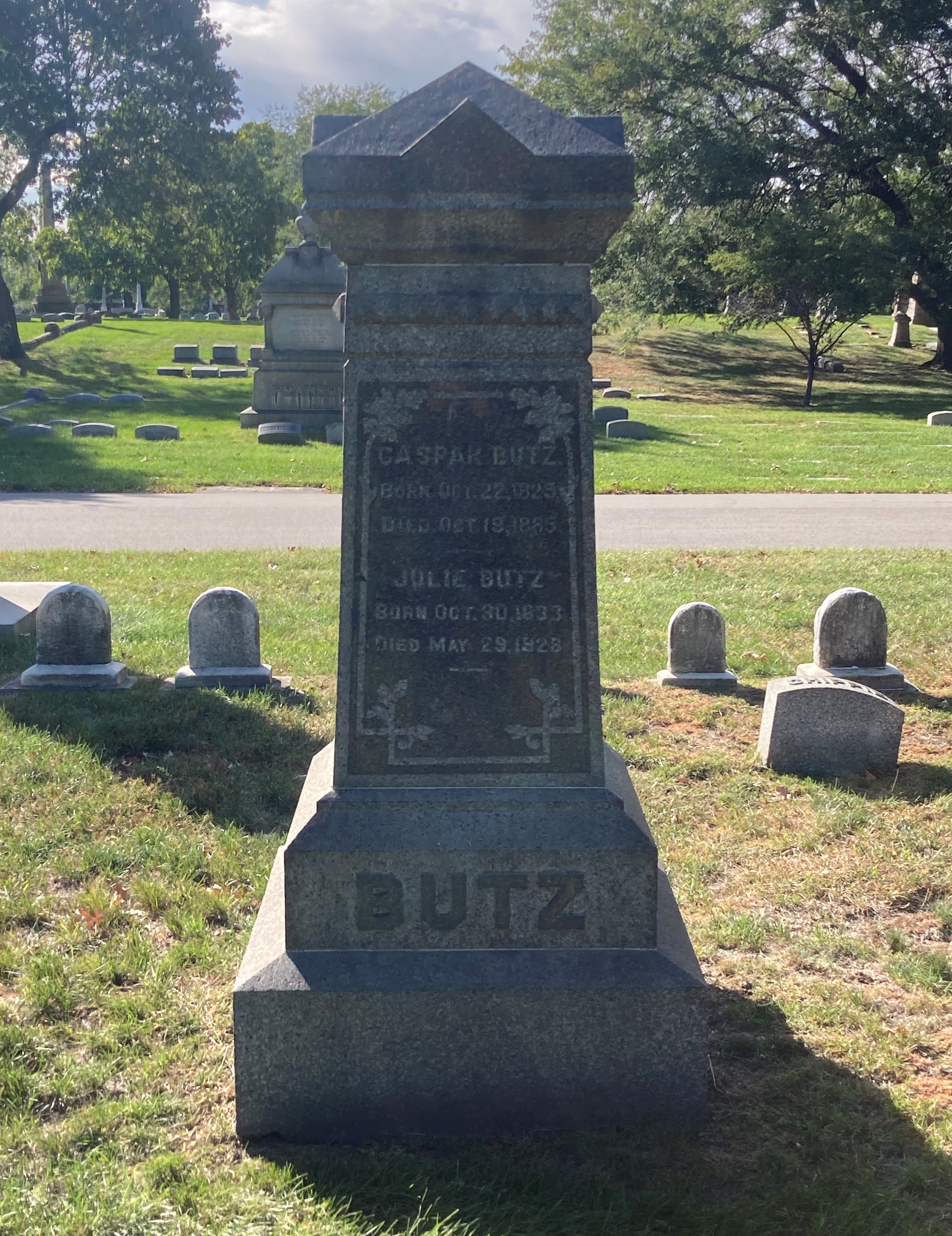
Butz's grave
