= Patrick J. Howard =

American politician

City Clerk of Chicago
- In office 1879–1883
- Preceded by: Caspar Butz
- Succeeded by: John G. Neumeister

Personal details
- Born: January 5, 1847 Kingstown, United Kingdom of Great Britain and Ireland
- Died: April 8, 1914 (age 67) Chicago, Illinois, U.S.
- Party: Democratic

Patrick J. Howard (January 5, 1847 – April 8, 1914) was an Irish-American politician in Chicago. Born in Kingstown, Ireland, he immigrated to New York City with his family before moving to Chicago in 1854. A Democrat, Howard served two terms as City Clerk of Chicago from 1879 to 1883. Following his tenure as City Clerk, he was appointed assistant to the City Treasurer of Chicago. He died in 1914 at the age of 67.
