= Joseph K.C. Forrest =

American journalist

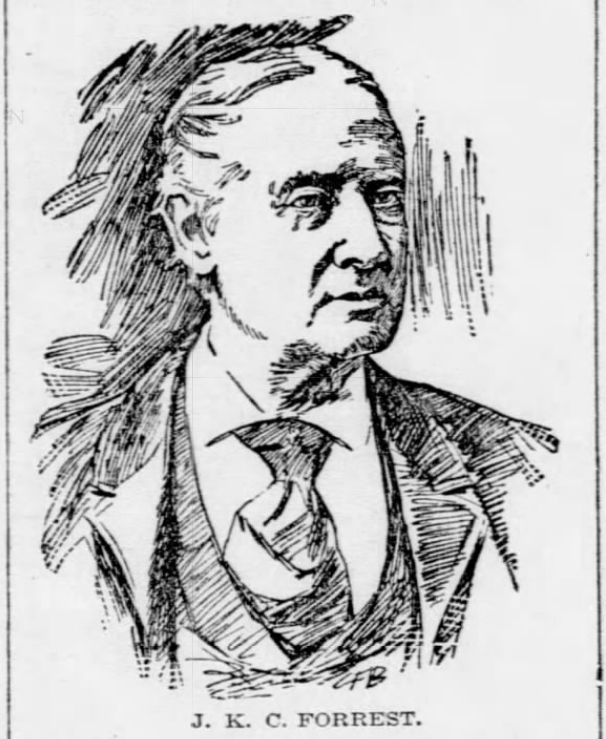

City Clerk of Chicago
- In office 1873–1875
- Preceded by: Charles T. Hotchkiss
- Succeeded by: Caspar Butz

Personal details
- Born: November 26, 1820 Cork, Ireland
- Died: June 23, 1896 (age 75) Chicago, Illinois, U.S.
- Party: Republican

Joseph K.C. Forrest (November 26, 1820 – June 23, 1896) was an Irish American journalist and politician who served as City Clerk of Chicago from 1873 to 1875.

== Biography ==
Forrest was born in Cork, Ireland, on November 26, 1820, and settled with his family in Chicago in 1840, when the city was still a small settlement. A journalist by trade, Forrest quickly became assistant editor of the Chicago Evening Journal and by 1844 was the managing editor of the Gem of the Prairie, which merged into the Chicago Tribune (the latter of which received its name at the suggestion of Forrest). He sold his stock in the Tribune shortly thereafter and accepted the position of assistant editor of the Chicago Democrat, with which he remained for fifteen years. Following his stint at the Chicago Democrat, Forrest went to work as a Washington correspondent for several Chicago and St. Louis-based newspapers before joining the staff of the Chicago Inter Ocean. During the Civil War, Forrest was appointed to the staff of Governor Yates with the rank of Colonel. He later accepted a position with the Chicago Daily News and wrote for the newspaper for the remainder of his career.

His first political post was that of Clerk of the Cook County Recorder's Office, to which he was elected during his tenure as assistant editor to the Chicago Democrat. In 1873, he was elected City Clerk of Chicago on the Republican ticket, and served in this capacity until 1875. Forrest died in Chicago on June 23, 1896.
