= William Loeffler =

American politician

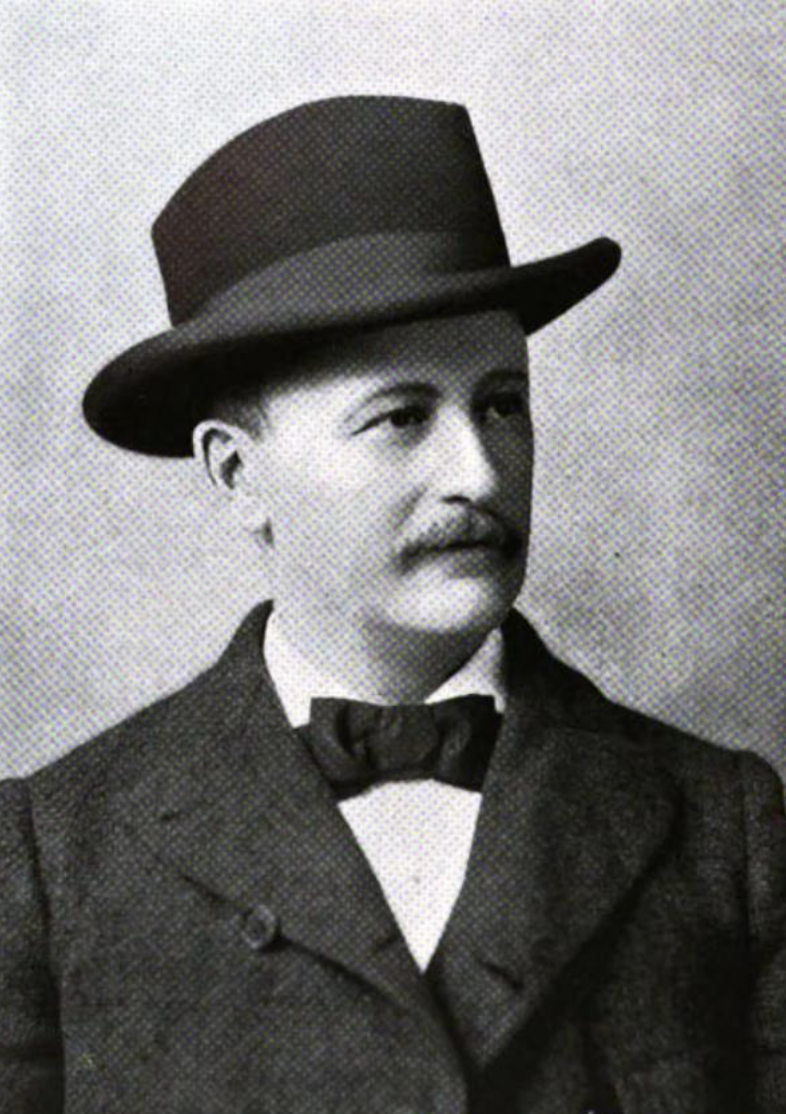

City Clerk of Chicago
- In office 1897–1903
- Preceded by: Charles A. Gastfield
- Succeeded by: Fred C. Bender

Member of the Chicago City Council from the 8th ward
- In office 1892–1894
- Preceded by: Frank J. Dvorak
- Succeeded by: Frank Slepicka

Personal details
- Born: January 1, 1857 Domažlice, Kingdom of Bohemia
- Died: June 22, 1909 (aged 52) Kierspe, Province of Westphalia, German Empire
- Political party: Democratic

William Loeffler (January 1, 1857 – June 22, 1909) was a German American politician from Bohemia who served as Alderman of Chicago's Eighth Ward from 1892 to 1894 and as City Clerk of Chicago from 1897 to 1903.

He was born in Domažlice to Frank and Minnie (Reach) Loeffler. He graduated from a Latin school in Prague in 1872. He moved to the United States and settled In Chicago. He found work as a butcher, and then created a wholesale pork business.

In June 1957, he married Frances Hall, with whom he had one son.

In June 1898, the Illinois Attorney General alleged he was neglecting his duties as city clerk to inform civil service commissioners about employment vacancies.

Loeffler died on June 22, 1909 in Kierspe, Germany and was buried in Chicago.
