= Charles Woodward Stearns =

American physician and author

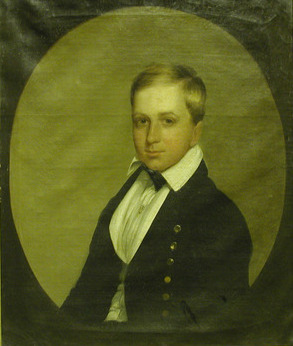
- Portrait of Charles Woodward Stearns by Chester Harding
- Born: September 24, 1817; Springfield, Massachusetts, U.S.
- Died: September 8, 1887 (aged 69); Longmeadow, Massachusetts, U.S.
- Education: Yale College (1837); Harvard Medical School; University of Pennsylvania Medical School, M.D. (1840)
- Relatives: Benjamin Trumbull (great-grandfather)

Charles Woodward Stearns (September 24, 1817 – September 8, 1887) was an American writer and medical doctor.

== Early life ==
Stearns was born in Springfield, Massachusetts, on September 24, 1817. He was the elder son of Charles Stearns. His mother, Julia Ann Woodward, was a granddaughter of the Rev. Dr. Benjamin Trumbull of North Haven, Connecticut.

Stearns graduated from Yale College in 1837. After graduation, he studied for two years in the Medical School of Harvard College but took his degree of M.D. at the Medical School of the University of Pennsylvania in 1840.

== Career ==
He began practicing medicine in Springfield but soon became a surgeon in the United States Army and served in Florida and in New York Harbor in 1841 and 1842. He then spent two years in Europe. After his return, he lived in Springfield and New York City and engaged in literary occupations as well as in the practice of his profession.

On the outbreak of the American Civil War, he enlisted as surgeon of the Third New York Infantry, remaining with that regiment until it was mustered out in May 1863. After this, he relinquished the practice of medicine.

Following the war, he became a teacher, missionary, and planter in the American South. He wrote The Black Man of the South, and the Rebels: or, The Characteristics of the Former, and the Recent Outrages of the Latter in 1872. He also published Shakespeare's Medical Knowledge in 1865, The Shakespeare Treasury of Wisdom and Knowledge in 1869, and A Concordance and Classified Index to the Constitution of the United States in 1872.

== Personal life ==
Stearns married Elizabeth Wolcott of Springfield on June 23, 1853. After her death, he married, on July 2, 1862, Mary E., daughter of W. C. Shaw, of Baltimore, Maryland, who died in New York City on May 30, 1877. He next married, on April 23, 1879, Amanda Akin, daughter of Judge Albro Akin, of Dutchess County, New York, who survived him. He left no children.

While spending some months in Williamstown, Massachusetts, in 1884, he was stricken with paralysis and remained an invalid for the rest of his life. He died in Longmeadow, Massachusetts, September 8, 1887, at the age of 70.
