= Benjamin Trumbull =

American historian (1735–1820)

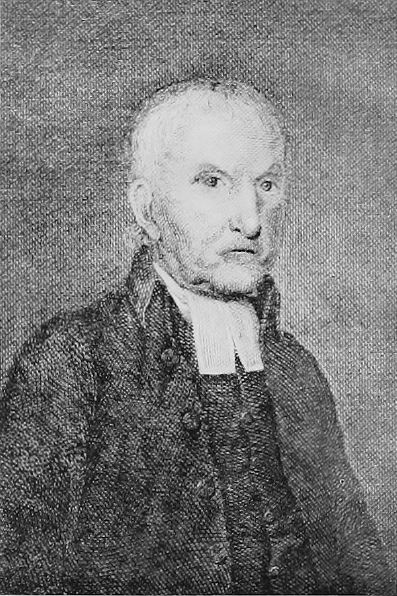
- Born: 19 December 1735; Hebron, Connecticut Colony, British America
- Died: 2 February 1820 (aged 84)
- Education: Yale University (DD)
- Occupations: preacher; historian
- Relatives: Lyman Trumbull (grandson)

Benjamin Trumbull (19 December 1735 – 2 February 1820) was an early American historian and preacher.

== Early life ==
Benjamin Trumbull was born in Hebron, Connecticut Colony, in 1735 to Benjamin Trumbull. He graduated from Yale University in 1759 and studied theology under Reverend Eleazar Wheelock. Wheelock delivered his ordination sermon in 1760, commending him to the people of North Haven as “not a sensual, sleepy, lazy, dumb dog, that could not bark back.”

== Career ==
Trumbull began as a pastor on December 24, 1760, at the Congregational Church in New Haven. He was a pastor for about sixty years, his preaching being interrupted only by the Revolution, in which he served both as a volunteer and as chaplain for the Wadsworth's Brigade under James Wadsworth. After the war he published a pamphlet sustaining the claim of Connecticut to the Susquehanna purchase, which influenced the decision of Congress in her favor. Yale gave him the degree of D.D. in 1796. He published Twelve Discourses on the Divine Origin of the Holy Scriptures (Hartford: Hudson and Goodwin, 1790); A General History of the United States of America; from the Discovery, in 1492, to 1792, . . . . that was intended to be three volumes, but he lived only to complete the first, Vol. I: Exhibiting a General View of the Principal Events, from the Discovery of North America, to the Year 1765 (New York: Williams & Whiting, 1810); and A Complete History of Connecticut, Civil and Ecclesiastical, from the Emigration of Its First Planters from England, in MDCXXX, to MDCCXIII (Hartford: Hudson & Goodwin, 1797), later expanded in a second edition to A Complete History of Connecticut, Civil and Ecclesiastical, from the Emigration of Its First Planters from England, in 1630, to the Year 1764; and to the Close of the Indian Wars (New Haven, CT: Maltby, Goldsmith, & Co. and Samuel Wadsworth, 1818). The manuscript collections from which this history is compiled are in the Yale library. His grandson Lyman Trumbull was a U.S. Senator from Illinois.

Trumbull was elected a member of the American Antiquarian Society in 1814. AAS holds original copies of over 40 titles related to, or authored by Trumbull, as well as the manuscript of his General History of the United States He died in North Haven, Connecticut.
