= Walter Trumbull =

- Born: c. 1846; Springfield, Illinois
- Died: October 25, 1891
- Occupations: naturalist, writer

Walter Trumbull (c. 1846 - 1891) was an American explorer and writer. He was a member of the Washburn–Langford–Doane Expedition in 1870 that explored the area of Wyoming that would eventually become Yellowstone National Park.

He was the son of United States Senator Lyman Trumbull.

He contributed to the Helena Rocky Mountain Gazette and the Overland Monthly.

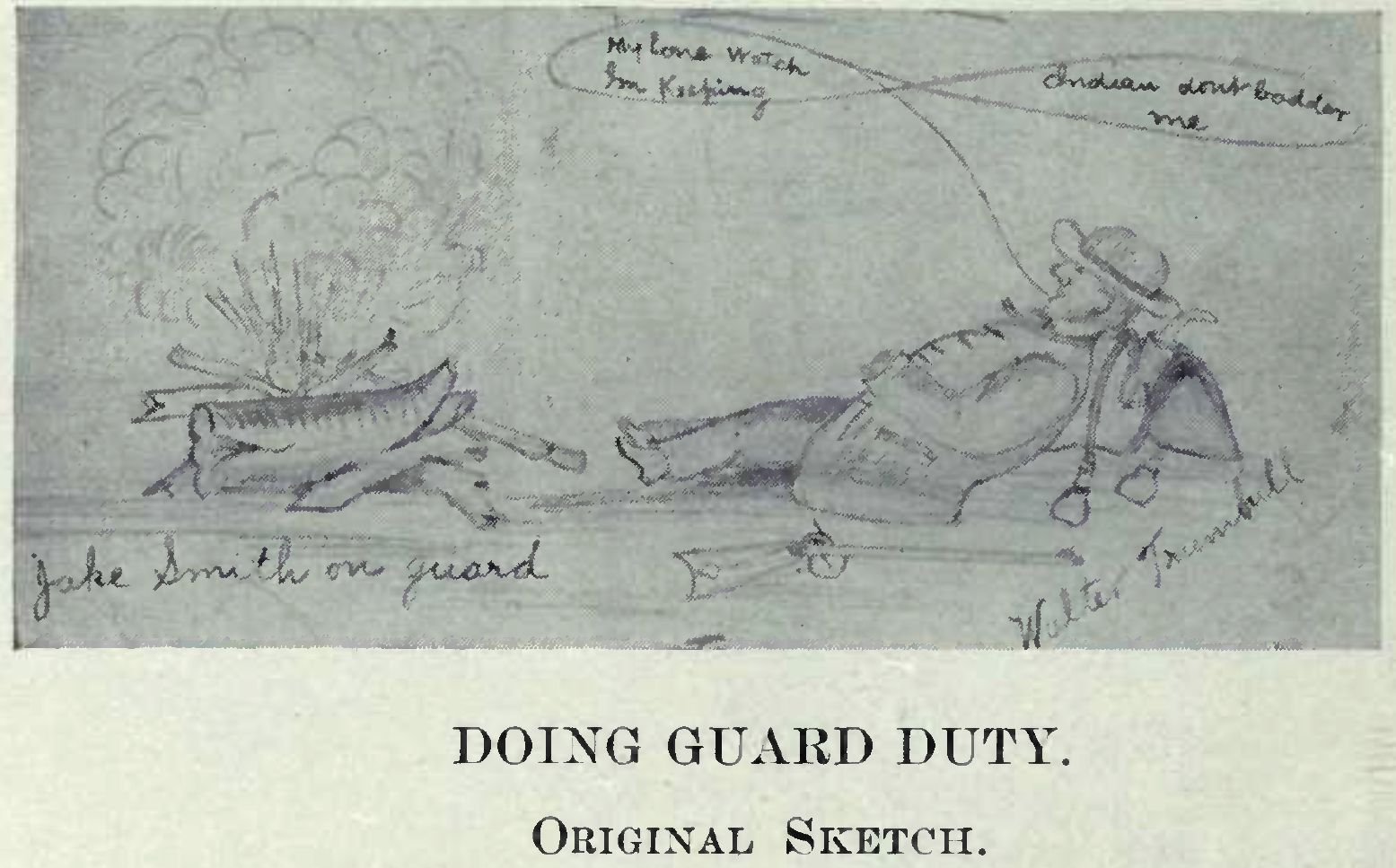
Original sketch by Trumbull, published following the expedition
