= Ebenezer Peck =

American politician

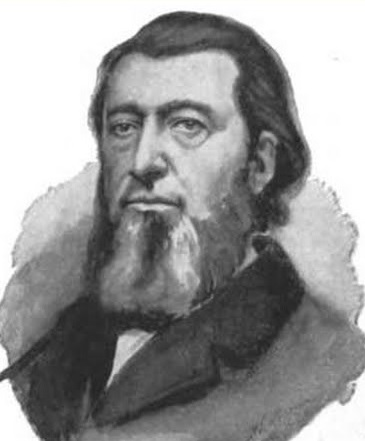
- From the March 1896 edition of McClure's Magazine

Judge of the Court of Claims
- In office March 10, 1863 – May 1, 1878
- Appointed by: Abraham Lincoln
- Preceded by: Seat established by 12 Stat. 765
- Succeeded by: William H. Hunt

Member of the Illinois House of Representatives from the 57th district
- In office 1858–1860 Serving with Caspar Butz
- Preceded by: Isaac N. Arnold; A.F.C. Mueller
- Succeeded by: Solomon M. Wilson; Homer Wilmarth

Member of the Illinois Senate
- In office 1838–1839
- Succeeded by: James Hutchinson Woodworth

Member of the Legislative Assembly of Lower Canada
- In office 1829–1834

Personal details
- Born: Ebenezer Peck; May 22, 1805 Portland, District of Maine
- Died: May 25, 1881 (aged 76) Chicago, Illinois, US
- Party: Democratic (until 1853); Republican (from 1856)
- Education: read law

Ebenezer Peck (May 22, 1805 – May 25, 1881) was an attorney and politician in the United States and Lower Canada and a judge of the Court of Claims.

== Education and career ==
Born on May 22, 1805, in Portland, District of Maine (then part of Massachusetts), Peck read law in Montreal, Lower Canada (now Quebec), British North America in 1827. He entered private practice in Stanstead and Sherbrooke, Lower Canada from 1827 to 1833. He was King's counsel for Lower Canada in 1833. He was a member of the Legislative Assembly of Lower Canada from 1829 to 1834. He moved to Illinois in 1835. He was an internal improvement commissioner for Chicago, Illinois in 1837. He was a member of the Illinois Senate from 1838 to 1839. He was a member of the Illinois House of Representatives from 1840 to 1842, and from 1858 to 1860. He was a member of the Democratic Party until 1853, but his anti-slavery views led him to leave that party in 1853, and by 1856, he was assisting in establishing the Republican Party in Illinois. He was clerk for the Illinois Supreme Court from 1841 to 1848. He was in private practice in Chicago from 1846 to 1863. He was publisher and editor of The Argus in Chicago in 1850. He was reporter for the Illinois Supreme Court from 1849 to 1863.

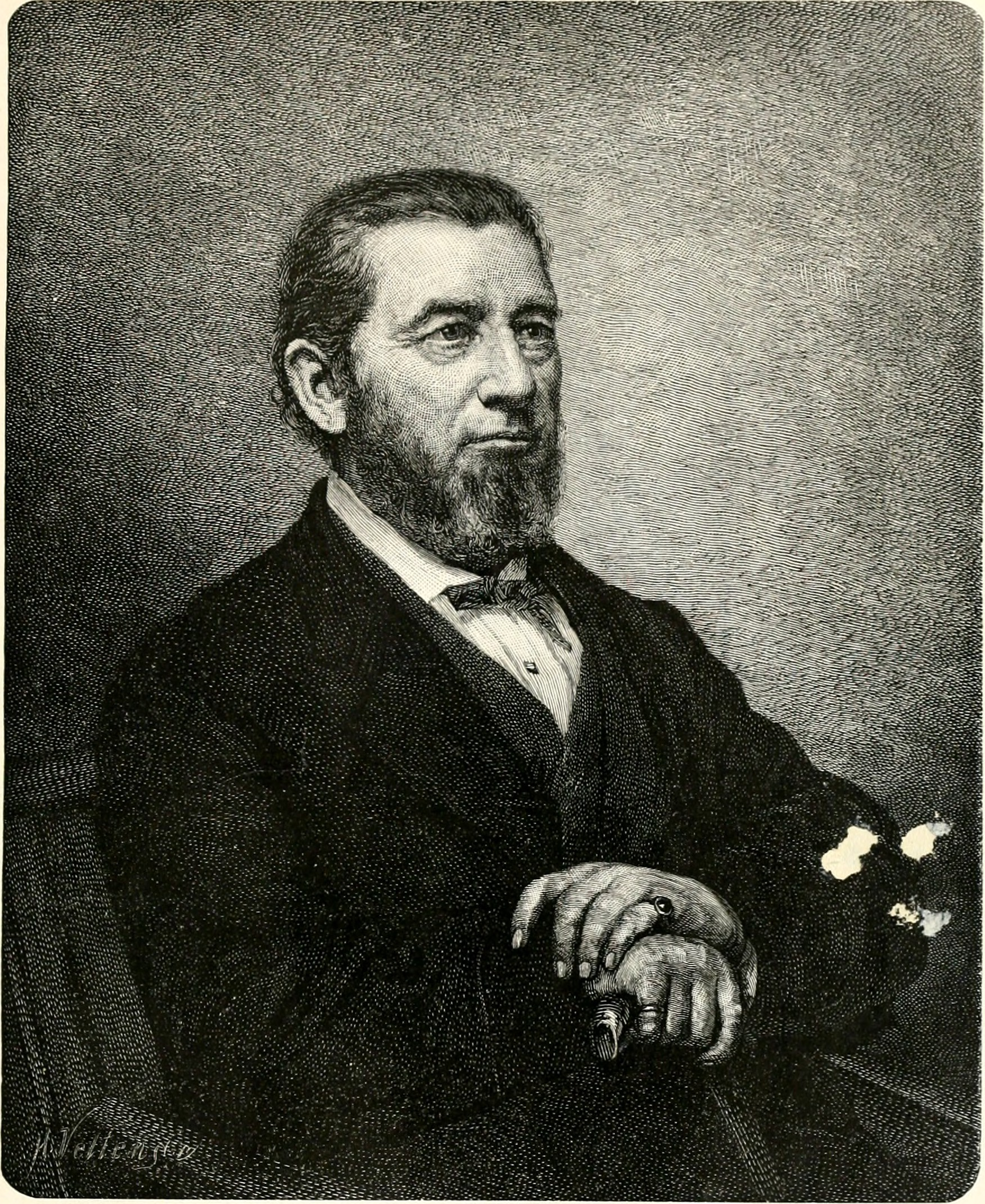
Ebenezer Peck; painting by Healy, 1864

== Federal judicial service ==
Peck was nominated by President Abraham Lincoln on March 6, 1863, to the Court of Claims (later the United States Court of Claims), to a new seat authorized by 12 Stat. 765. He was confirmed by the United States Senate on March 10, 1863, and received his commission the same day. His service terminated on May 1, 1878, due to his resignation.

== Death ==
Peck died on May 25, 1881, in Chicago.
