= William Major =

William Major may refer to:

- William James Major (1881–1953), Canadian politician
- William Major (Ontario politician) (1896–1966), Canadian politician
- William T. Major (1790–1867), American religious leader in Bloomington, Illinois
