= Henry Whitney =

Henry Whitney may refer to:

- Henry Clay Whitney (1831–1905), American lawyer
- Henry Martyn Whitney (1824–1904), early journalist in the Kingdom of Hawaii
- Henry Melville Whitney (1839–1923), Boston industrialist
- Hank Whitney (born 1939), American basketball player
- Henry Howard Whitney (1866–1949), United States military officer and spy

== See also ==
- Henry Whitney Bellows (1814–1882), American clergyman
- Harry Whitney (disambiguation)
