= John E. W. Thompson =

American physician and diplomat

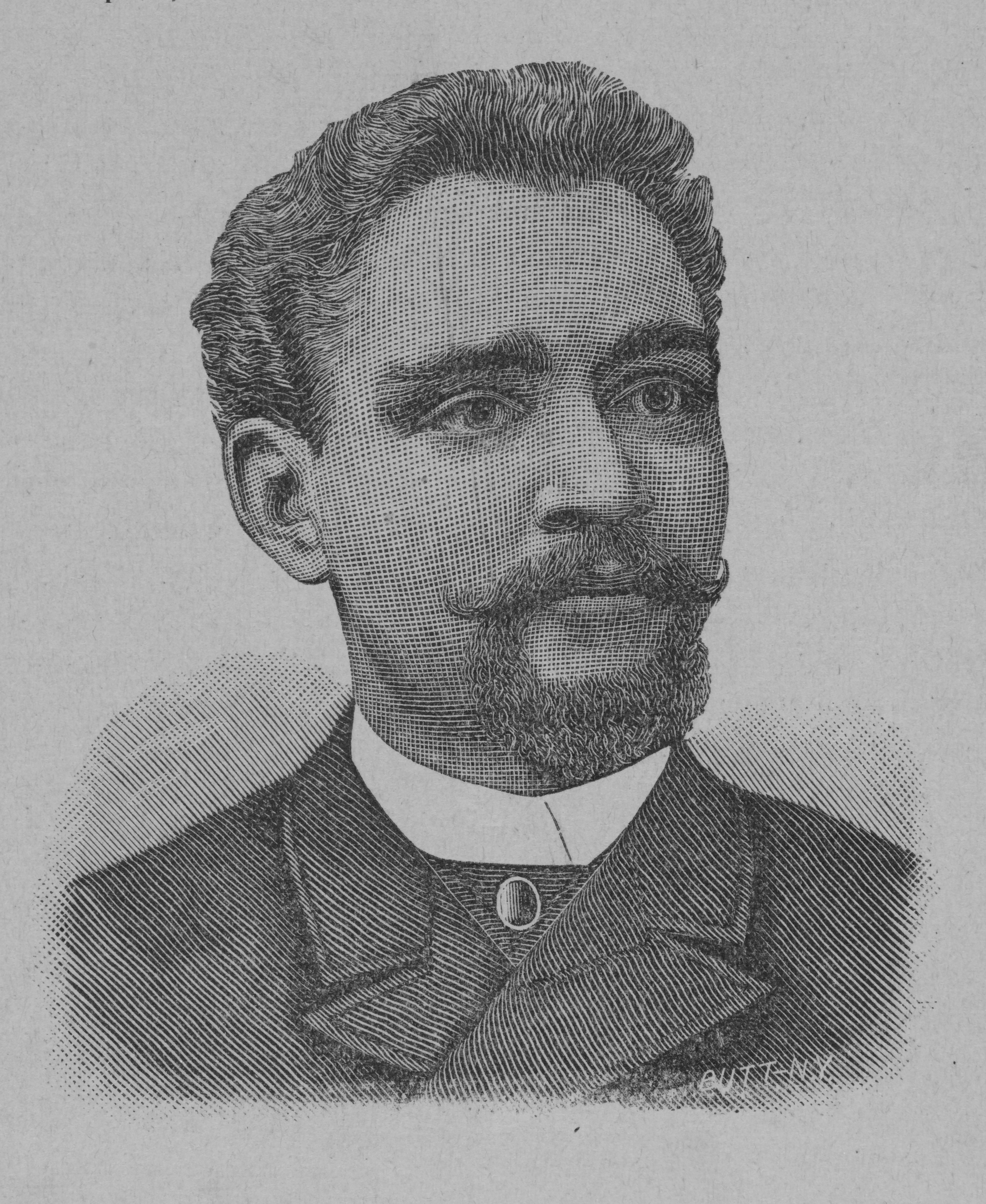

United States Ambassador to Haiti
- In office May 9, 1885 – 1889
- Preceded by: George Washington Williams
- Succeeded by: Frederick Douglass

Personal details
- Born: 16 December 1860 Brooklyn, New York, U.S.
- Died: 6 October 1918 (aged 57) Bridgeport, Connecticut, U.S.
- Education: Yale University; University of Haiti

John Edward West Thompson (December 16, 1860 – October 6, 1918) was an American physician and diplomat. His parents were immigrants to New York City from Haiti. In 1884, after graduating from Yale University and studying medicine further in Europe, Thompson became one of the first African-American physicians to practice in New York City.

He served as U.S. Minister Resident / Consul General to Haiti from June 30, 1885, to October 17, 1889, and as U.S. Chargé d'Affaires to Santo Domingo from 1885 to 1889, both under political appointments by Democratic president Grover Cleveland. After returning to the US, he established a medical practice in New York, and became active in the Democratic Party in the city. He later had a medical practice in Bridgeport, Connecticut, where he was killed by a disturbed patient.

== Early life and education ==
John Edward West Thompson was born on December 16, 1860, (Note: Sources vary on the year of Thompson's birth. Several contemporary biographical sources state a birth year of 1860, or that he was in his 57th year at death, and scholarly articles in the 1970s and 1980s also state 1860. However, his birth year is given as 1855 in the Dictionary of American Negro Biography (1982) and the website BlackPast.org, and at least one contemporary obituary states he was aged 68 at death.) in Brooklyn, New York, to Haitian immigrants Edward James and Matilda Frances (White) Thompson. The family moved to Providence, Rhode Island, around 1870. He was raised as a Catholic and later attended St. Benedict the Moor Church in Manhattan.

After attending local schools, Thompson studied at Weston Military Institute and Lawrence Academy in Groton, Massachusetts. Thompson graduated from Yale School of Medicine in 1883. Shortly after graduation, he studied throughout Europe, Paris, England, Scotland, and Ireland. Thompson became one of the first African-American physicians in New York City in 1884. He received the degree of M.D. from the University of Haiti in 1887. Thompson was also a French scholar and expert in international law.

== Diplomacy ==
President Grover Cleveland nominated Thompson as US Minister Resident to the Republic of Haiti on May 9, 1885. Thompson was also appointed chargé d'affaires to the Republic of Santo Domingo. His nomination was supported by senators Noah Porter and Abram Hewitt. Southern Democratic senators were outraged by Cleveland's nomination of an African American to these posts.

Thompson received a Senate confirmation on January 13, 1886, after he had already arrived in Port-au-Prince. The copy of his credentials was mailed on July 20, 1886.

As minister resident, Thompson was called upon, and claimed that he had represented 60,000,000 Americans at Santo Domingo for six years. One of his first assignments was to investigate a homicide allegedly committed by Van Blokklen, an American who was imprisoned as a suspect by the Haitian government. He had to report on the matter to the Department of State.

On May 26, 1888, disturbances broke out in Haiti over the presidential elections. The two opposing candidates were exiled on June 6. Haitian politicians applied to the US consulate for asylum five days later. On July 2, military commanders changed. Arson broke out at Port-au-Prince on July 8. The following day, the government asked for United States support by a war vessel. On July 16, discontent about Haitian President Lysius Salomon resulted in widespread street protests. Salomon abdicated one month and two days later.

Anarchy followed after the abdication. General Seïde Thélémaque led a march at Port-au-Prince on August 25. A provisional government was established by September 5 with the American officers of the U.S.S. Galena. Fighting broke out again on October 16, and General Thélémaque died in action. Haitian pirates hijacked an American vessel, the S. S. Haytian Republic. They took it to Port-au-Prince. Thomas F. Bayard and Thompson sent two warships to force its release, which the Americans achieved. Thompson was widely praised for the negotiations. The following day, General François Denys Légitime was declared chief of the executive power of Haiti. The French minister was charged with attempted bribery on the next day.

In the late 19th century, ships coming from Caribbean ports sometimes carried passengers with cholera or other infectious diseases such as yellow fever. As the medical community had little understanding of how the diseases were spread, and sanitation was poor in most cities, cholera and yellow fever swept through American sea and river ports in more than one epidemic in this period. The US minister was supposed to ensure that ships departing for the United States had no outstanding health issues.

Thompson issued such a bill of health against Captain Francis Munroe Ramsay and his steamship, USS Boston. The ship was quarantined for a period in the port of Port-au-Prince before she sailed to New York City. On November 15, 1889, Thompson certified that the Boston was free of the plague or cholera.

On November 24, the French minister and the British consul-general announced they had failed to effect a reconciliation of major parties in the north of Haiti to Légitime. Insurgents declared on December 14 that the ports were closed from commerce by decree of the Assembly. Légitime abdicated on August 23, 1889, after an eleven-month rule.

General Florvil Hyppolite entered Port-au-Prince six days later to declare power. Thompson and the Spanish consul-general both mediated between the opposing political parties.

It was reported that Thompson spent a contingent expense of $333.02 on travel in 1889 and $130.46 in 1890. Meanwhile, Thompson's deduct repayments amounted to $15.

== Later life ==
After returning to the United States, Thompson had a medical practice as a physician in Mount Hope, New York. He also worked in Atlanta. Thompson became a medical inspector of the Department of Health in 1895.

He remained active in politics. In August 1898, Thompson served as a delegate to the fifth convention of the Negro National Democratic League at the Tammany Hall United Colored Democracy at 152 West 53 Street in New York City. In New York, African Americans were becoming allied with the Democratic Party, after long supporting the Republican Party of Abraham Lincoln. At a time when initials were often used for given names, The New York Times reported his name with errors in 1892 and 1898. and "Mr. Thomson" rather than Thompson.

Thompson returned to Bridgeport, Connecticut, in 1913, where he lived with his wife. Their sons, Ernest and Elliott Thompson, both served in the United States Army during WWI.

== Murder ==
In 1918, Thompson was treating a patient, Thomas Saloway. For several months, the 30-year old man had been a patient of Thompson in 1918. He lived at 137 Clinton in Bridgeport. Saloway believed to be in poor health, according to friends. It was implied that he was a hypochondriac. Thompson met Saloway on October 2, as discovered by a receipt. The appointment did not go well, as Saloway grew both hostile and crazed.

On October 6, Thompson began to enter his medical office at 966 Main Street in Bridgeport, Connecticut. Saloway waited for Thompson to approach, drew a knife and stabbed him in the heart. Nick Scorfacio, an Italian American employee, cleaned Thompson's office before he witnessed the murder. Saloway ran from the scene of the crime. Thompson was rushed to St. Vincent's Hospital, but he died in the ambulance on the way. Saloway meantime had committed suicide by plunging the same knife into his own body.

The medical examiner, S. M. Garlic, performed the autopsies on both Thompson and Saloway. Noting that the knife wounds were located in the same location of the chests of both men, he speculated that Saloway had planned the doctor's murder. Saloway's family did not claim his body for burial.

Thompson's body was cared for by undertaker Louis E. Richard, on 1476 Main Street. His funeral was held on October 11. Although the local newspaper originally reported that Thompson would be buried in St. Michael's the Archangel's Parish, he was buried in Mountain Grove Cemetery in Bridgeport. His wife, Mary C. Thompson, survived him.

== Sources ==
- John E. W. Thompson, U. S. Department of State, Bureau of Public Affairs, Office of the Historian
- Index to Politicians, The Political Graveyard
