= Joseph Gillespie =

American politician

Member of the Illinois Senate from the Madisson County district
- In office 1846 – 1858

Member of the Illinois House of Representatives from the Madisson County district
- In office 1840 – 1842

Personal details
- Born: August 22, 1809 New York City, New York
- Died: January 7, 1885 (aged 75) Edwardsville, Illinois
- Party: Whig; Know Nothing; Republican
- Profession: Attorney

Joseph Gillespie (August 22, 1809 – January 7, 1885) was an American politician from New York. Moving with his family to Illinois at a young age, Gillespie fought in the Black Hawk War before studying law at Transylvania University. Upon graduation, he was elected to a two-year term in the Illinois House of Representatives, where he once jumped out of a window with Abraham Lincoln to stop a quorum. He was elected to the Illinois Senate in 1846, serving for twelve years. He was a founder of the Illinois Republican Party and served on the Illinois circuit courts for twelve years.

== Biography ==
Joseph Gillespie was born on August 22, 1809, in New York City. In 1819, his father moved the family near Edwardsville, Illinois. Because there were few schools in the area, Gillespie was educated at home by his mother. Gillespie left with his brother for the lead rush of Galena, Illinois, on February 22, 1827. After little success, he returned to Edwardsville in 1829 and worked on his father's farm. However, he was determined to practice law as a profession and moved to Wood River to study under Cyrus Edwards, the brother of Ninian Edwards a founding political figure of the state of Illinois.

After two years of study, the Black Hawk War broke out. Gillespie enlisted under Gen. Samuel Whiteside's mounted regiment. Following the end of the war in September 1832, Gillespie studied law at Transylvania University. When he returned to Illinois, he was soon elected Probate Judge of Madison County. In 1840, he was elected to the Illinois House of Representatives as a Whig. In 1839, the Whig representatives learned of an attempt by House Democrats to suspend the Whig-controlled state banks. The Whigs were a minority in the House, but Democrats needed more than two Whigs to be present to take a legal quorum. Democrats managed to bring enough members to take the quorum and locked the doors to keep the Whigs in session. To escape the quorum, Gillespie, Abraham Lincoln, and at least one other Whig jumped out of a first-floor window. Their efforts, however, were in vain.

After a two-year term, Gillespie returned to Edwardsville to practice law. In 1846, he was elected to the Illinois Senate, serving three four-year terms. In 1850, Gillespie worked with two other senators to force the Illinois Central Railroad to pay 7% of its gross earnings to the state. He advocated for the connection of Alton, Illinois, which was in his district, to a new railroad; the line became known as the Terre Haute & Alton before it was merged into the Cleveland, Cincinnati, Chicago and St. Louis Railway. Gillespie then became the railway company's lawyer and was frequently consulted by other lines.

After his final Senate term expired, he returned to his law practice, partnering with his nephew David Gillespie. In 1856, Gillespie was selected as one of the ten delegates to the Bloomington Convention, the founding of the Illinois Republican Party. He oversaw the next state Republican convention in 1860. Gillespie was elected to the Illinois circuit courts in 1861, serving until his retirement in 1873. He worked with other judges to create the Illinois Appellate Court.

Gillespie married Mary E. Smith in June, 1845. They had three surviving children: one daughter and two sons. He died at his home in Edwardsville on January 7, 1885.

Joseph Gillespie is the namesake of Gillespie, Illinois.
