= Harry Whitney (disambiguation) =

Harry Whitney was an American sportsman.

Harry Whitney may also refer to:

- Harry Payne Whitney (1872–1930), American businessman and thoroughbred horse breeder
- Harry Whitney, a character in the film Andre

== See also ==
- Henry Whitney (disambiguation)
