= 132nd Illinois Infantry Regiment =

132nd Regiment Illinois Volunteer Infantry
- Active: 1 June–17 October 1864
- Country: United States
- Allegiance: Union
- Branch: Infantry
- Size: Regiment
- Garrison/HQ: Paducah, Kentucky
- Engagements: Western Theater of the American Civil War; Expedition to Haddix's Ferry; Action at Haddix's Ferry

Commanders
- Notable commanders: Colonel Thomas J. Pickett

The 132nd Regiment Illinois Volunteer Infantry was an infantry regiment of the Union Army during the American Civil War. It was among scores of regiments that were raised in the summer of 1864 as Hundred Days Men, an effort to augment existing manpower for an all-out push to end the war within 100 days and served its term of enlistment as a garrison unit in Paducah, Kentucky.

== History ==
The 132nd Illinois was organized at Camp Fry in Chicago and mustered in for 100 days on 1 June 1864, under the command of Colonel Thomas J. Pickett. Company A was composed of men from LaSalle and Cook counties, Company B of men from Cook and Fulton counties, Company C of men from Kane and Kendall counties, Company D of men from Fulton and Peoria Counties, Company E of men from Fulton County, Company F of men from Dekalb County, Company G of men from Cook, Henry, and Knox counties, Company H of men from Rock Island County, Company I of men from Cook County, and Company K of men from Cook, Dekalb, and Winnebago counties.

The regiment departed for Columbus, Kentucky, on 6 June, arriving there two days later. It was attached to the District of Columbus, Kentucky, part of the 6th Division, XVI Corps, Department of the Tennessee. The regiment relocated to Paducah on 15 June, where it spent the rest of its service on garrison duty. After pro-Confederate guerrillas were reported to have fired shots at boats on the Tennessee River and harassed Unionists, an expedition of 200 men from the 132nd Illinois and 400 men from the 8th Regiment Heavy Artillery U.S. Colored Troops under the command of 132nd Illinois Major John H. Peck was sent to Haddix's Ferry below Aurora on 25 July. After landing there two days later, the expedition pursued a group of guerrillas inland and routed them, killing five, wounding several, and capturing seven.

From August to October the regiment was assigned to the District of Columbus as part of the Department of the Ohio. After the conclusion of 100 days the 132nd Illinois returned to Chicago, where it was mustered out on 17 October. During its service, it lost twelve men to disease, its only casualties.

== See also ==
- List of Illinois Civil War units
