= Thomas J. Pickett =

American politician (1821–1891)

Thomas Johnson Pickett Sr. (March 17, 1821 – December 24, 1891) was an American politician. Trained at a young age as a typesetter, Pickett founded a number of papers throughout Illinois, Kentucky, and Nebraska. He was the president of the Illinois Editorial Association and was a delegate to the Bloomington Convention. He was elected to the Illinois Senate in 1860, then raised a pair of regiments during the Civil War, reaching the rank of Colonel. He returned to Kentucky after the war and ran unsuccessfully for United States Congress. Late in his life he managed papers in Nebraska with his family. He also served as Grand Master of Illinois and Kentucky.

== Biography ==
Thomas Johnson Pickett was born on March 17, 1821, in Louisville, Kentucky. In 1830, his family moved to St. Louis, Missouri, then again moved in 1836 to Peoria, Illinois. Pickett apprenticed as a type-setter, then founded the Peoria News in 1840. He soon sold the paper and founded the Peoria Transcript. After founding the first paper in Pekin, Illinois, Pickett moved to Rock Island, Illinois, founding the Rock Island Register. In 1851, he was elected the first president of the Illinois Editorial Association. In this capacity, he oversaw the Editorial Convention that prompted the Bloomington Convention, the founding of the Illinois Republican Party. Pickett served as a delegate to the convention and served as a delegate to the Republican National Convention later that year.

Pickett was the first to formally endorse Abraham Lincoln as a presidential candidate, when he wrote an editorial in a spring 1859 issue of the Register. He was also again a delegate in 1860 to the Republican National Convention. Later that year, Pickett was elected to the Illinois Senate for a four-year term.

Upon the outbreak of the Civil War, Pickett was offered a position as brigadier general, but declined. Later in the war, he organized the 69th Illinois Volunteer Infantry Regiment and served as its lieutenant colonel. He later organized the 132nd Illinois Volunteer Infantry Regiment and served as its colonel. At the end of the war, he moved to Paducah, Kentucky, founding the Federal Union. There, he was appointed postmaster and later served as clerk of the United States district court. He ran for United States Congress in Kentucky's 1st congressional district in 1874, but was defeated by Andrew Boone.

Pickett moved to Nebraska City, Nebraska in 1879. He founded the Nebraska City Sun there with his sons, then moved to Lincoln, Nebraska, the next year. He founded The Capital there, then founded the Franklin County Guard. He moved into his son's house in Ashland, Nebraska, in April 1891, helping his son run the Ashland Gazette.

Pickett married twice. He was a Freemason, serving as Grand Master of both Illinois and Kentucky. Pickett also served as a trustee of the Illinois Normal School. He died from a stroke in Ashland Kentucky on December 24, 1891.
