= Lincoln's Lost Speech =

1856 speech by Abraham Lincoln

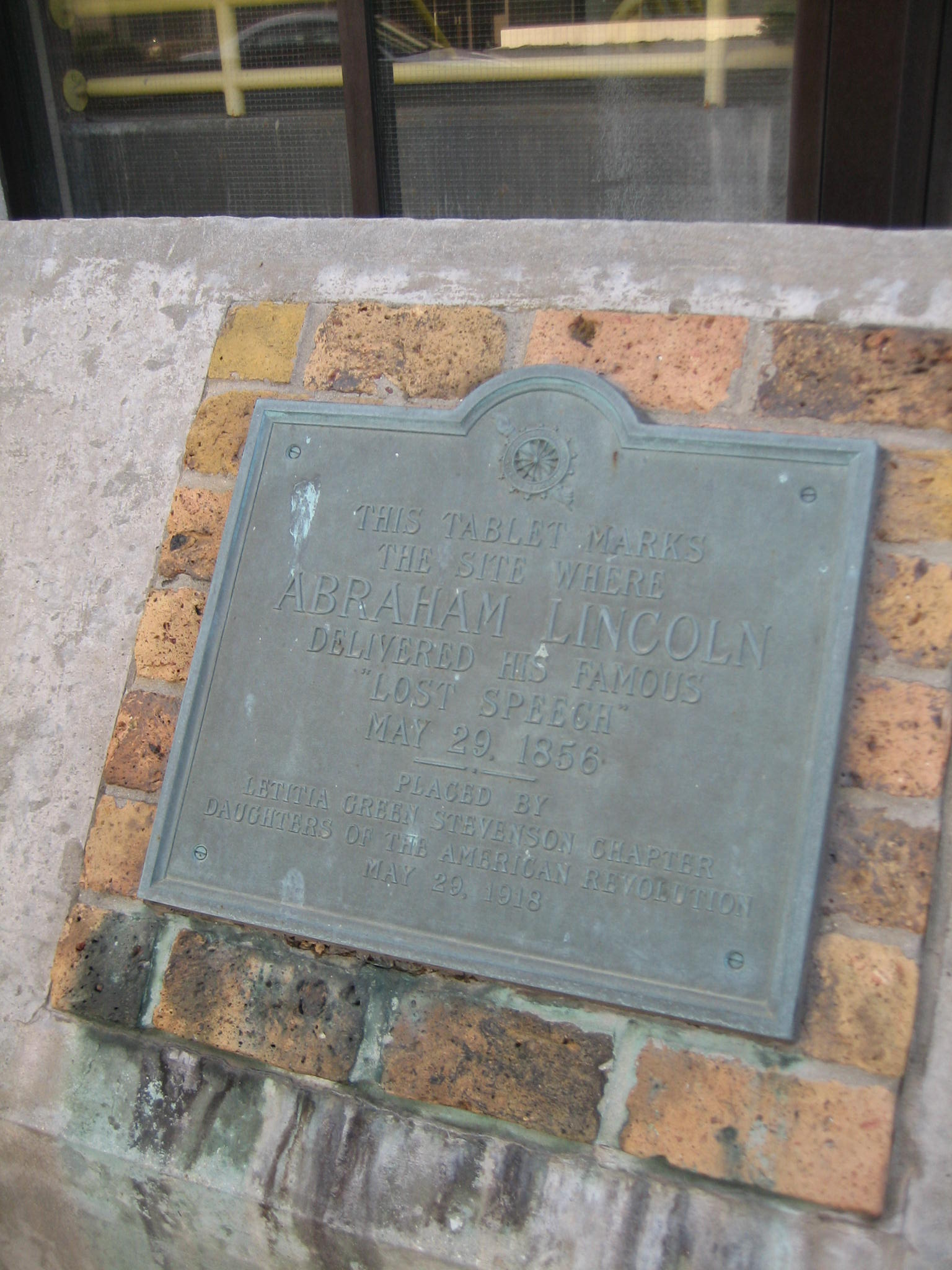
This plaque marks the site of the Lost Speech.

Lincoln's "Lost Speech" was a speech given by Abraham Lincoln at the Bloomington Convention on May 29, 1856, in Bloomington, Illinois. Traditionally regarded as lost because it was so engaging that reporters neglected to take notes, the speech is believed to have been an impassioned condemnation of slavery.

== Speech ==
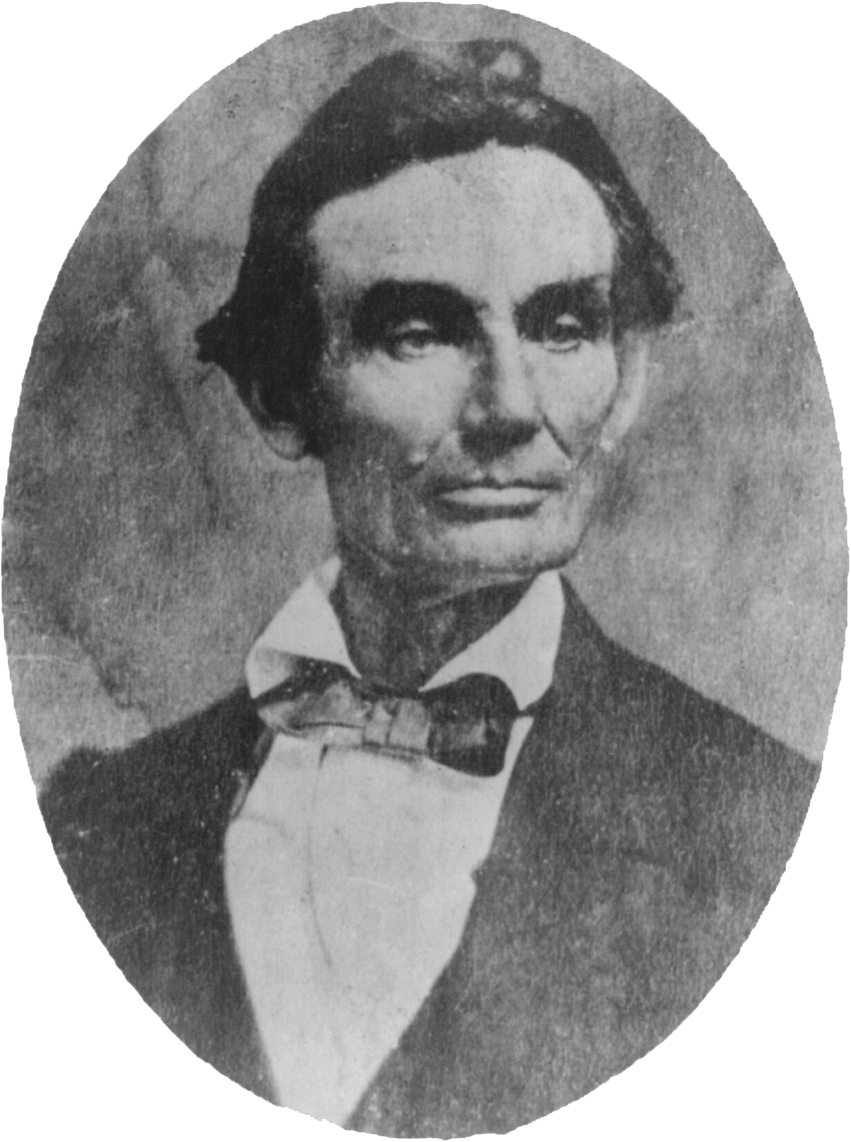
Lincoln in 1856, around the time of the Lost Speech.

Lincoln's Lost Speech was given at the since demolished building at the corner of East and Front Streets in downtown Bloomington, Illinois, known as Major's Hall on May 29, 1856. Lincoln gave the speech at the Anti-Nebraska Bloomington Convention that culminated with the founding of the state Republican Party in Illinois.

There are no known transcripts or written accounts of the Lost Speech, other than a brief summary in the local press. Eyewitnesses have offered snippets of some of Lincoln's content that day. William Herndon asserted that some of Lincoln's House Divided Speech was not based on new concepts at the time of its delivery. He wrote that Lincoln's "house divided against itself cannot stand" originated with the famous Bloomington speech of 1856. In fact, he was in attendance of the speech and had attempted to write down the speech, but gave up after fifteen minutes and threw away the paper that contained part of it. Editor of the Chicago Tribune Joseph Medill claimed that Chicago lawyer Henry Clay Whitney's transcript of the speech was accurate; Whitney's version was later debunked.

It is thought that the speech was a strongly worded derision of slavery. It is known that Lincoln's condemnation of the expansion of slavery was strong.

The traditional reason given for the lack of any written recollection of the Lost Speech is that Lincoln's skilled and powerful oration had mesmerized every person in attendance. Reporters were said to have laid down their pencils and neglected note taking, as if hypnotized by Lincoln's words. When the speech ended, no notes existed and the reporters couldn't fully recall the whole speech, so media reports of the day simply recorded the fact that the speech had been delivered.

There is evidence in Herndon's recollections that the fact that the speech was "lost" may not have been an accident. So strongly worded was Lincoln's oration that others in attendance feared the words might lead to a crumbling of the Union and that Lincoln consented to suspending "its repetition" for the duration of the 1856 campaign.

== Whitney version ==
In 1896, Chicago attorney Henry Clay Whitney published his account of the speech in an issue of McClure's Magazine. Whitney claimed he had taken notes during the speech and based his version of the speech upon those notes. He said that after a lapse of forty years, Ida M. Tarbell urged him to publish these notes, which he did. In a book, limited to 500 copies and bound in white boards, the speech was reproduced by the Republican Club of the City of New York as a souvenir for its annual Lincoln Dinner on February 12, 1897. There are no other printings of the speech.

Initially, Whitney's version was given some credibility. Ida Tarbell sought out Joseph Medill, who was present at the Lost Speech while working as a reporter for the Chicago Tribune, and he claimed that Whitney's version displayed "remarkable accuracy".

Tarbell was unwittingly carried away by the story, but others were skeptical. Former Lincoln private secretary John George Nicolay declared Whitney's version devoid of Lincoln's style and a fraud. Robert Lincoln, Abraham's son, agreed with Nicolay's assessment. In 1900, the McLean County Historical Society declared their skepticism. In modern times, Lincoln researcher and director of the Chicago Historical Society Paul M. Angle exposed Whitney's version of the speech and his claims of its validity as a "fabrication".

== Importance ==
Lincoln's Lost Speech was famous, with a status considered legendary by the time Tarbell became enamored with Whitney's version of it. Lincoln was said to have spoken "like a giant inspired" and the tale of how the speech came to be lost was well known. Many who attended the speech considered it the greatest of Lincoln's life. Given at the first state convention, which essentially founded the Illinois Republican Party, the speech thrust Lincoln into the national political limelight.

Though it was known as the Lost Speech, its content influenced people nonetheless. Those who heard it were often asked to repeat what they heard and a frenzied group of supporters spearheaded Lincoln's drive toward a second-place finish among U.S. vice presidential candidates in 1856.

== See also ==
- Abraham Lincoln and slavery
- The Lincoln Hunters
