= William T. Major =

William Trabue Major (1790–1867) was a prominent religious leader in Bloomington, Illinois in the mid-19th century. He founded the First Christian Church (affiliated with the Christian Church (Disciples of Christ) denomination) and built the city's first public meeting hall, Major's Hall, which hosted an early convention of the Illinois branch of the Republican Party and became best known as the site of "Lincoln's Lost Speech".

Major was born in Kentucky in 1790, a son of John Major and Judith Trabue. He moved to Illinois in 1835. He had begun as a Baptist, but disagreed with their beliefs that supported slavery. He changed his affiliation to the "Campbellites", as the Disciples of Christ denomination was then known informally, and founded the First Christian Church of Bloomington in 1837.

Initially he and his wife, the former Margaret Allen Shipp, held services in their home. In 1840, they opened a wooden church building near the corner of Front and East Streets just south of the downtown. In 1852, they opened a public meeting hall next door to the church, which was known as Major's Hall. The Hall received much attention in 1856, when the Illinois branch of the fledgling Republican Party held a convention on the building's third floor, featuring frequent Bloomington visitor Abraham Lincoln. The future President's fiery, influential anti-slavery speech has no known transcript, and became known as "Lincoln's Lost Speech".

In 1857, Major's Hall became the first home of Illinois State Normal University, which the teachers' college occupied until the school's new campus was opened in Normal, Illinois in 1861. Also in 1857, the Majors dedicated a new, brick-clad building to house First Christian Church, at the corner of Jefferson Street and what is now Roosevelt Street. The current sanctuary, opened in 1959, is the third church structure on that site.

Major died in 1867 as a prominent citizen of the city. He and Margaret, who had produced nine children between them, are buried in Evergreen Cemetery. Although what was left of Major's Hall (an 1872 fire having destroyed the historic third floor) was demolished in 1959, the Major name is commemorated in a portion of the church's annex, which includes a large meeting room known as Major Hall.
