= Henry Clay Whitney =

American lawyer

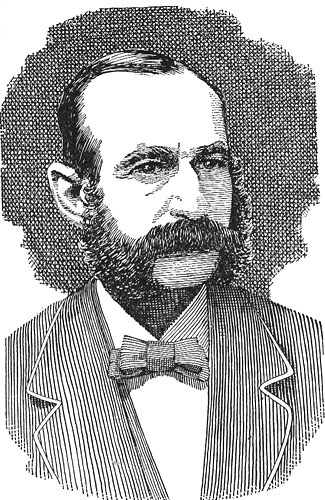
Henry Clay Whitney engraving by Romaine Proctor

Henry Clay Whitney (23 February 1831 – 27 February 1905) was an American lawyer who was a close friend of President Abraham Lincoln, and later a biographer of the president.

== Life ==
Henry Clay Whitney was born on 23 February 1831 in Detroit, Maine, son of Alfred Metcalf Whitney of Chicago. He received a classical education at Augusta College, Kentucky and at Farmer's College, Ohio, and then studied law at the Cincinnati and Chicago law schools. In 1854 he moved to Urbana, Illinois, where he entered the practice of law. Around the time when he first appeared at the bar, Whitney met Lincoln, whom he found unselfishly helpful. Whitney became one of Lincoln's friends and political allies, helping him on the Illinois circuit. On 5 August 1857 Whitney married Sarah Ann Snyder, then aged 16. They had five children, two boys and three girls, born between 1858 and 1868.

On 6 August 1861, early in the American Civil War, Whitney was appointed Assistant U.S. Paymaster, holding this office until 13 March 1865. While in this office, $11 million passed through his hands. After the war, he settled in Kansas, where he practiced the law, engaged in politics and edited a newspaper. Later he returned to Chicago, where he continued to practice the law. Whitney died in 1905.

== Works ==
Whitney published a two-volume biography of Lincoln, Lincoln the Citizen and Lincoln the President, in 1892. He also published an account of his time with Lincoln in Life on the Circuit with Lincoln in 1892. He published a version of "Lincoln's Lost Speech" in McClure's Magazine in 1896. The speech was made at the Illinois State Republican Convention at Bloomington, Illinois on May 29, 1856, and was said to have been Lincoln's finest. Whitney claimed his version was based on notes he had made while the speech was being delivered, but its accuracy has been questioned due to the 40-year delay before publication, as well as "upon the unexplained omission of so choice an item in Life on the Circuit ... as well as its dissonance with Lincoln's known utterances and with a contemporary report in the Alton Courier". Whitney has been described as "an unscrupulous reporter", willing to stretch the facts to make his point. Benjamin Thomas, another biographer of Lincoln, wrote: "Never a man to underestimate his own powers, Whitney was held at a somewhat lower valuation by his colleagues".

== Bibliography ==
- Henry Clay Whitney (2009). Marriage and Divorce: The Effect of Each on Personal Status and Property Rights, with a Consideration. BiblioBazaar. ISBN 978-1-117-17773-1.
- Henry C. Whitney (1907). Lincoln the Citizen (February 12, 1809, to March 4, 1861), Volume 1. The Current Literature Publishing Co.
- Burlingame, Michael, ed. (April 8, 2025). Henry C. Whitney. Lincoln the Citizen, February 12, 1809 to March 4, 1861: The Complete Version. University of Illinois Press (restores material cut by editors of the original 1907 publication).
- Henry C. Whitney (1892). Lincoln the President (March 4, 1861 to May 3, 1865). New York: The Current Literature Publishing Co.
- Henry Clay Whitney (1892). Life on the Circuit with Lincoln: With Sketches of Generals Grant, Sherman and McClellan, Judge Davis, Leonard Swett, and Other Contemporaries. Estes and Lauriat.
- Abraham Lincoln; Marion Mills Miller; Henry Clay Whitney (1907). Life and Works of Abraham Lincoln: Letters and Telegrams, Adams to Garrison. The Current literature publishing company.
