= Bloomington Convention =

The Bloomington Convention was a meeting held in Bloomington, Illinois, on May 29, 1856, establishing the Illinois Republican Party. It was an attempt to unite Anti-Nebraska members of the Opposition Party into a single party. The convention adopted a party platform and nominated a ticket led by William Henry Bissell for Governor of Illinois. Bissell would be elected later that year, making him one of the first governors elected as a Republican.

== Background ==
By 1850, the Democratic Party had emerged as the leading political party in the United States. An uncertain stance on slavery led to the demise of the main Democratic competitor, the Whig Party. The slavery debate was briefly quelled by the Compromise of 1850, which settled several questions about the legality of slavery in new territories. However, the Kansas–Nebraska Act, proposed four years later, reignited tensions. The act would create two new territories and determined that slavery status there would be determined by a popular vote of residents.

Illinois had been a free state since its inception. The Kansas–Nebraska Act was designed by Senator Stephen A. Douglas and supported by his colleague James Shields, both Democrats. William Alexander Richardson led support of the bill in the United States House of Representatives, but failed to win the support of Democratic representatives Long John Wentworth and William Henry Bissell, as well as all Whigs. The act was passed on May 30, 1854, sparking a political upheaval. The Whig party dissolved and anti-slavery Democrats, including Bissell and Wentworth, abandoned their party; they united in a de facto Anti-Nebraska party, known as the Opposition Party.

After its ratification, Douglas spoke in the state capital of Springfield during the Illinois State Fair on behalf of the act. During the fair, prominent abolitionist Owen Lovejoy attempted to organize a convention against slavery, but struggled to convince political allies to join. Lincoln countered Douglas' defense of the act, and went on to debate him in seven other cities in 1858. Fueled by support in the central and northern parts of the state, the Opposition Party secured enough support to send Lyman Trumbull to the US Senate in place of Shields. Elihu B. Washburne, James H. Woodworth, James Knox, and Jesse O. Norton were elected to US Congress on behalf of the Opposition, which helped to usher in a national plurality in the lower house.

On January 15, 1856, the chairman of the nine existing state Republican Parties called for an informal convention in Pittsburgh, Pennsylvania, on February 22. Delegates from twenty-four states and four territories attended the event, which officially established a national Republican Party after three sessions. Concurrently, an Editorial Convention was held in Decatur, Illinois, for all state anti-Nebraska newspaper editors; twenty-five papers were represented. One of the resolutions approved by this convention was for the appointment of a state committee to call a state Republican convention.

== Convention ==
The first official Republican convention in Illinois was held on May 29, 1856, in Bloomington. Chairman John M. Palmer was elected convention president after his opening address. Nine vice presidents and five secretaries were then elected. The convention nominated Bissell for governor with Francis Hoffmann as lieutenant governor, Ozias M. Hatch for secretary of state, Jesse K. Dubois as auditor, and James Miller as treasurer. Hoffmann was found to be ineligible for his position due to a residency requirement, and John Wood was nominated in his place. The following resolutions defining the party platform were approved:

Resolved, That foregoing all former differences of opinions upon other questions, we pledge ourselves to unite in opposition to the present administration and to the party which upholds and supports it and to use all honorable and constitutional means to wrest the Government from the unworthy hands which now control it and to bring it back in its administration to the principles and practices of Washington, Jefferson and their great and good compatriots of the Revolution.

Resolved, That foregoing all former differences of opinions upon other questions, we pledge ourselves to unite in opposition to the present administration of the Government; that under the Constitution Congress possesses the power to prohibit slavery in the Territories; and that, whilst we will maintain all constitutional rights of the South, we also hold that justice, humanity, the principles of freedom as expressed in our Declaration of Independence and our national constitution, and the purity and perpetuity of our Government require that that power shall be exerted to prevent the extension of slavery into territory heretofore free.

Resolved, That the repeal of the Missouri Compromise was unwise and injurious; an open and aggravated violation of the plighted faith of the States, and that the attempt of the present administration to force slavery into Kansas against the known wishes of the legal voters of that Territory is an arbitrary and tyrannous violation of the rights of the people to govern themselves, and that we will strive by all constitutional means to secure to Kansas and Nebraska the legal guaranty against slavery of which they were deprived at the cost of the violation of the plighted faith of the nation.

Resolved, That we are devoted to the Union and will, to the last extremity, defend it against the efforts now being made by the dis-unionists of this administration to compass its dissolution, and that we will support the Constitution of the United States, in all its provisions regarding it, as the sacred bond of our Union and the only safeguard for the preservation of the rights of ourselves and our posterity.

Resolved, That we are in favor of the immediate admission of Kansas as a member of this Confederacy under the constitution adopted by the people of said Territory.

Resolved, That the spirit of our institutions as well as the Constitution of our country, guarantees the liberty of conscience as well as political freedom, and that we will proscribe no one by legislation or otherwise on account of religious opinions, or in consequence of place of birth.

Lincoln delivered the closing address. The speech was purportedly so captivating that no reporter made a record of it. The address has become known as Lincoln's Lost Speech. The delegates to the convention were:

- 1st District: Sheldon M. Church
- 2nd District: William B. Ogden, declined and replaced by John Evans
- 3rd District: G. D. A. Parks
- 4th District: Thomas J. Pickett
- 5th District: Edward A. Dudley
- 6th District: William H. Herndon
- 7th District: Richard J. Oglesby, declined and replaced by J. C. Pugh
- 8th District: Joseph Gillespie
- 9th District: David L. Phillips
- At-large: Ira C. Wilkinson

== Aftermath ==
The Democrats had nominated Richardson for governor at their convention earlier that month. The remnants of the Whig party declined to run a candidate. The first Republican National Convention met that June, nominating John C. Fremont for president. Fremont was defeated handily in his bid for president, including in Illinois, but the Republican state ticket in Illinois was successful. Bissell became the first Governor from a party other than the Democrats since 1838. Republicans would win every subsequent gubernatorial election through 1893.

== See also ==
- Birthplace of the Republican Party
